= Tharparkar =

Tharparkar District: ٿرپارڪر; تھرپارکر; Eastern Sindh Frontier District
- District of Sindh
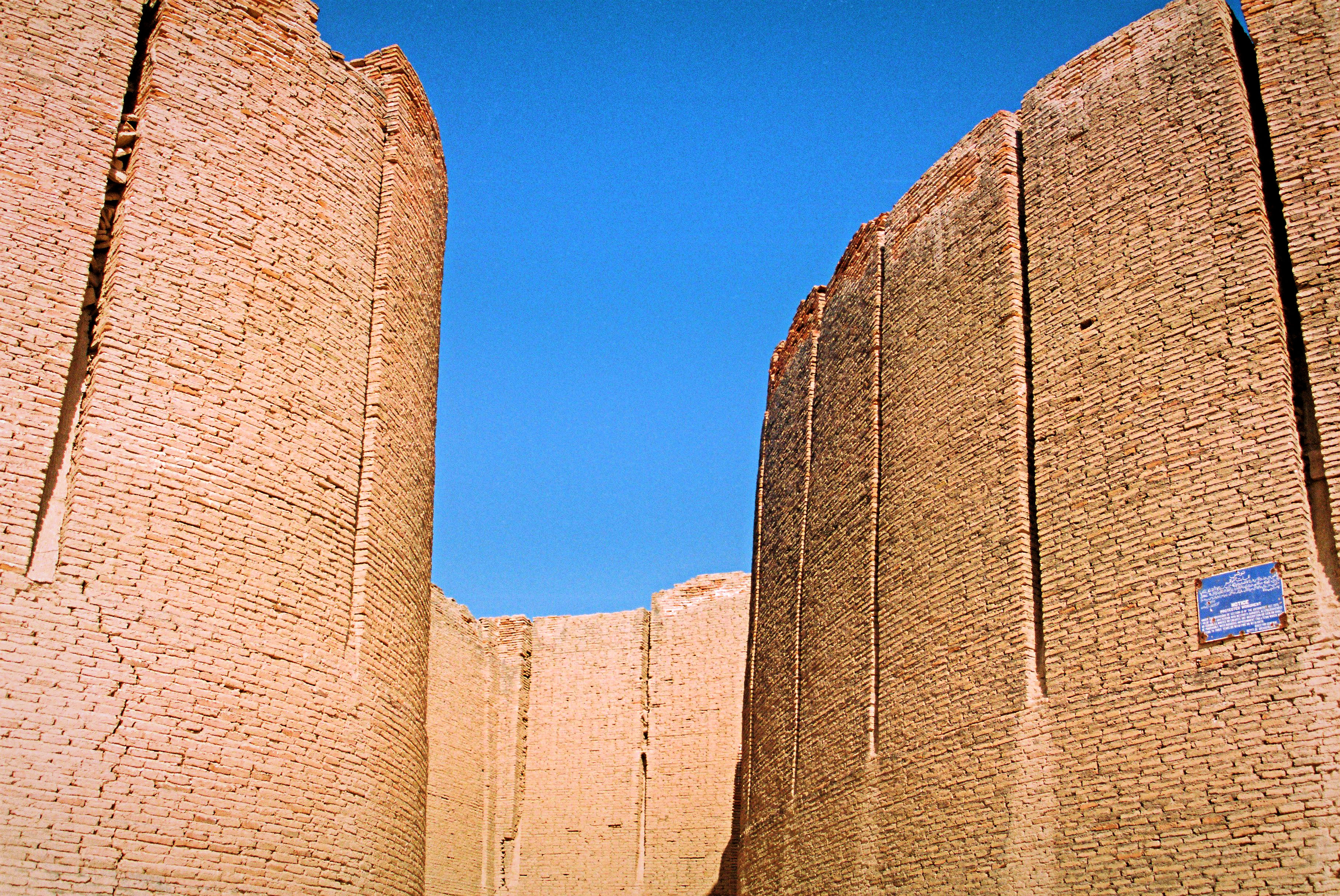
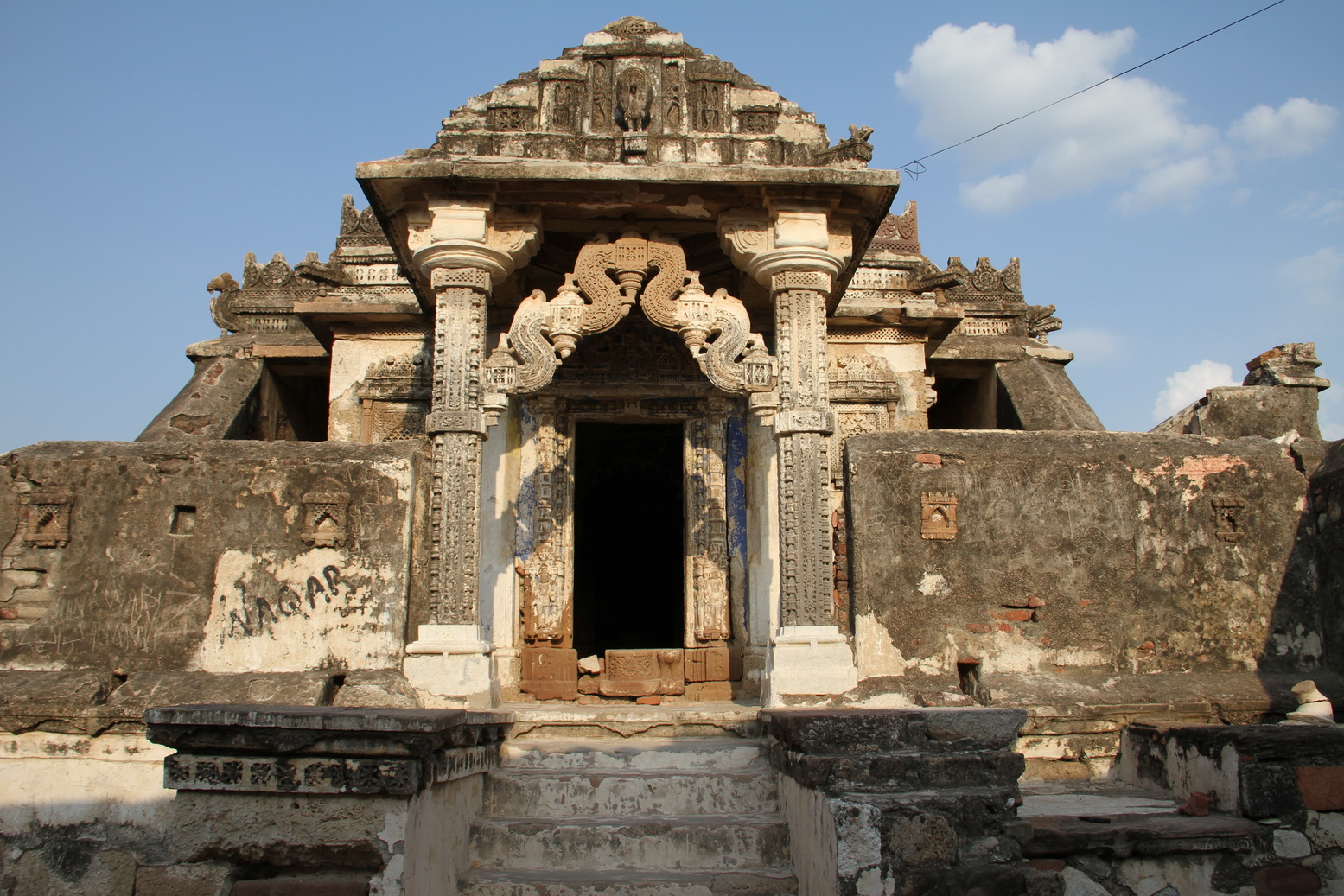
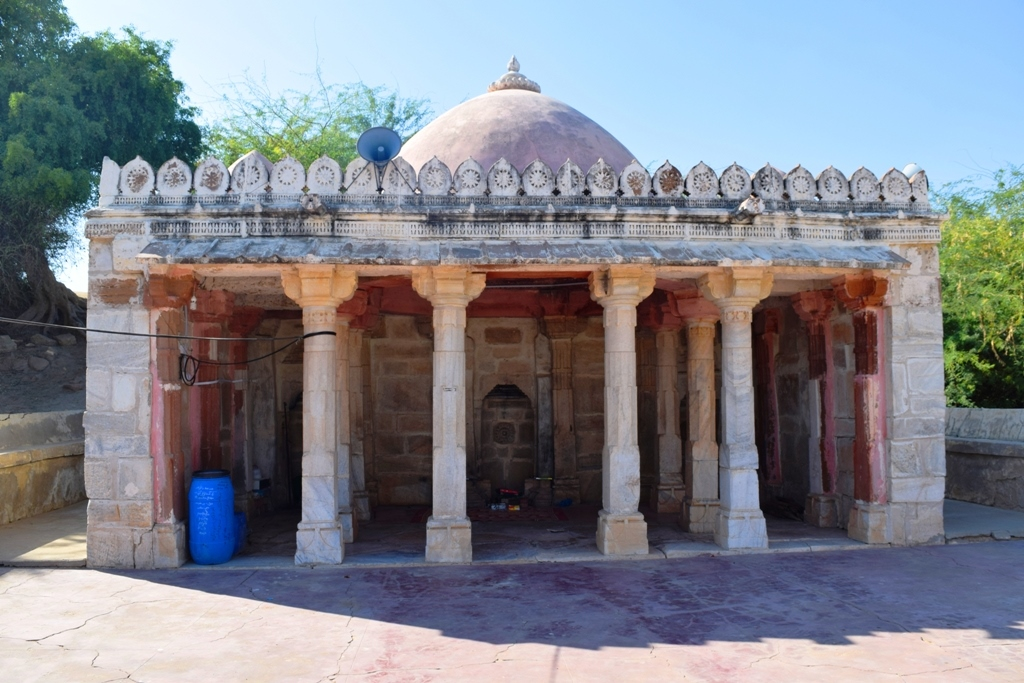
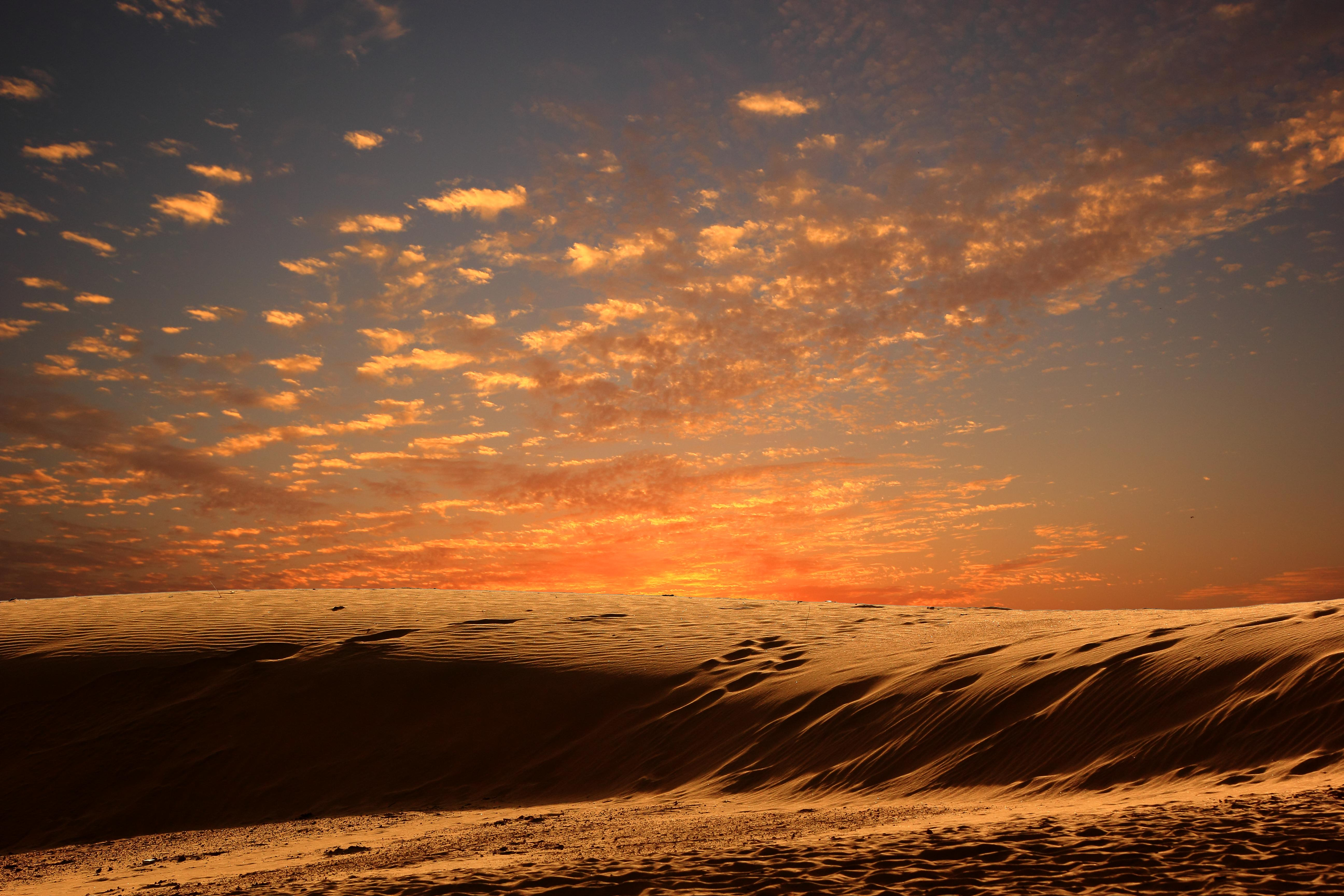
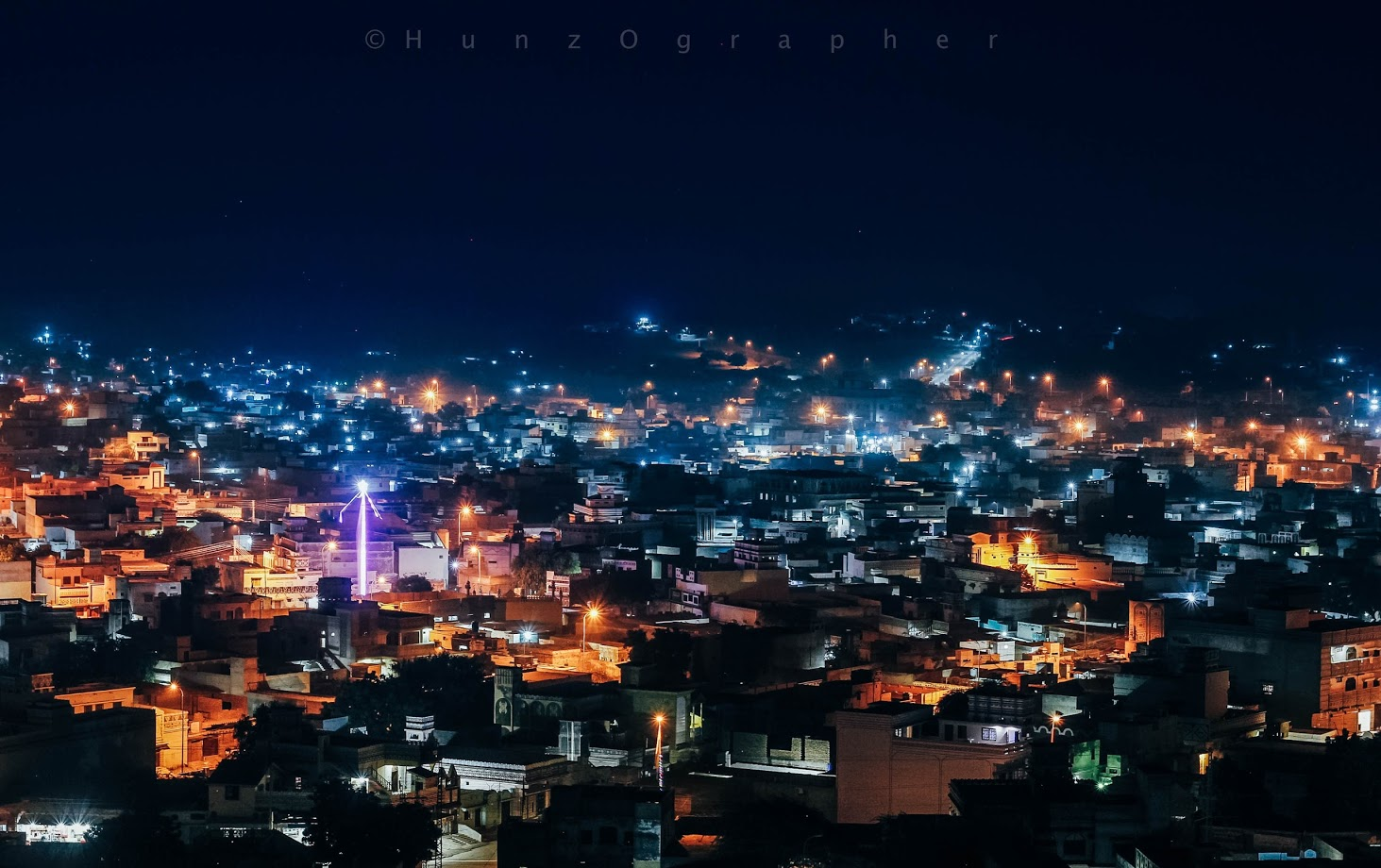
- Clockwise from top-left: Naukot Fort, Jain Temple, Nagarparkar, Thar Desert, view of Mithi, Bhodesar Masjid

- Location in Sindh
- Coordinates: 24°44′24″N 69°48′00″E
- Country: Pakistan
- Province: Sindh
- Division: Mirpur Khas
- Established: 1860
- Founder: British India Government
- Headquarters: Mithi

Government
  - Type: District Administration
  - Deputy Commissioner: Muhammad Nawaz Sohoo, PAS
  - District Police Officer: Zahida Parveen Jamro, PSP
  - District Health Officer: Dr. Herchand Rai

Area
  - District of Sindh: 19,637 km^{2} (7,582 sq mi)

Population (2023)
  - District of Sindh: 1,778,407
  - Density: 90.564/km^{2} (234.56/sq mi)
  - Urban: 144,405 (8.12%)
  - Rural: 1,634,002
- Demonym: Thari

Literacy
  - Literacy rate: Total: 36.39%; Male: 48.50%; Female: 23.49%
- Time zone: UTC+5 (PKT)
- HDI (2018) Rank in Pakistan: ▼0.427 (very low) ▼109th (out of 114)

Tharparkar (Dhatki/Sindhi: ٿرپارڪر; Urdu: تھرپارکر, Urdu pronunciation: [t̪ʰəɾpɑːɾkəɾ]), is a district in the Thar Region of the Sindh province in Pakistan, headquartered at Mithi. Before Indian independence it was known as the Thar and Parkar (1901–1947) or Eastern Sindh Frontier District (1860–1901).

The district is the largest in Sindh, and has the largest Hindu population in Pakistan. It has the lowest Human Development Index rating of all the districts in Sindh. Currently the Sindh government is planning to divide the Tharparkar district into Tharparkar and Chhachro district.

== History ==
The name Tharparkar originates from a portmanteau of the words Thar (referring to the Thar Desert), and parkar (meaning "to cross over"). The Thar region was historically fertile, although it was mostly desertified between 2000 BCE and 1500 BCE. Before its desertification, a tributary of the Indus River was said to flow through the region; it is speculated by some historians that this river could be the ancient Sarasvati River mentioned in the Hindu Rigveda. The Thar region is also mentioned in the Ramayana, where it is called "Lavanasagara" (meaning "salt ocean").

Sindh was ruled by various dynasties after the fall of the Indus Valley Civilisation. These dynasties included the Soomras, the Sammas, the Arghuns, the Kalhoras, and the Talpurs. These rulers primarily focused on the central and western parts of Sindh, while the eastern areas, including Tharparkar, were largely neglected. In 1843, as a part of the British conquest of large parts of the Indian subcontinent, Charles James Napier, the Commander-in-Chief of the Presidency Armies, defeated the Talpur dynasty and conquered Sindh. The conquered areas, including Tharparkar, were incorporated into the Cutch Agency and Hyderabad Collectorate. The government of British India divided Sindh into Collectorates, or districts, administered by British-appointed Zamindars.

Sindh was later made part of the Bombay Presidency of British India. In 1858, the entire area around Tharparkar became part of the Hyderabad District, and in 1860 the region was established as a subdivision of Hyderabad district and renamed as Eastern Sindh Frontier, with its headquarters at Amarkot. In 1882, Eastern Sindh Frontier subdivision bifurcated from Hyderabad District and established a separate district headed by a British Deputy Commissioner, with a political superintendent at Amarkot. In 1906, it was reorganized as the Thar and Parkar district and the district headquarters was moved from Amarkot to Mirpur Khas.

Prior to the partition of India, there was a very strong cultural and trading connection between Tharparkar, Gujarat and Rajasthan, which continued for some years after partition, before the border became sealed.

Large parts of Tharparkar were captured by Indian forces during the Indo-Pakistani war of 1971 in the Chachro Raid. They were returned to Pakistan only after signing of the Shimla Pact in 1972.

On 31 October 1990, the district was divided into the Tharparkar and Mirpur Khas Districts. On 17 April 1993, Umerkot District was carved out of Tharparkar.

== Geography ==
Tharparkar district lies between 69° 3′ 35″ E and 71° 7′ 47″ E longitudes, and between 24° 9′ 35″ N and 25° 43′ 6″ N latitudes. To its east, the district borders the Jaisalmer, Barmer and Jalore districts of Rajasthan in India. To the south, it borders the Kutch district of Gujarat in India. Umerkot district lies to its north while Badin and Mirpur Khas districts are to its west.

=== Climate and environment ===
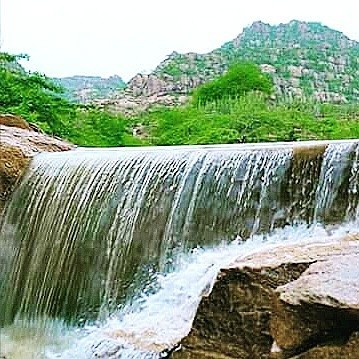
Nagarparkar after rains

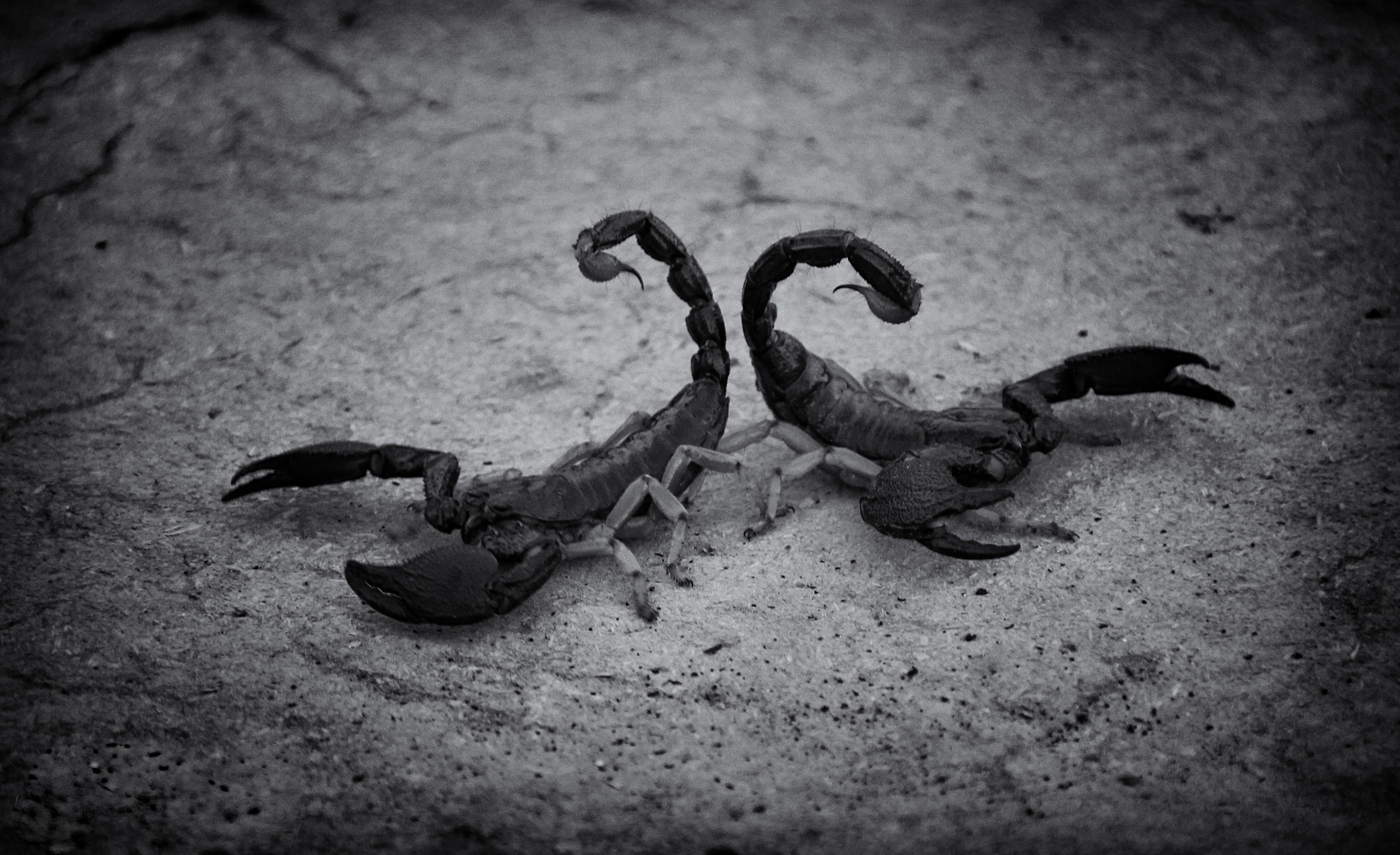
Tharparkar scorpions

The district has a tropical semi arid (Köppen: BSh) climate. During summer, it is extremely hot during the day, while nights are much cooler. April, May and June are the hottest months and December, January and February are the coldest months. The mean maximum and minimum temperatures during winter are 28 °C and 9 °C, respectively. There are wide fluctuations in annual rainfall and the yearly average in some areas is as low as 100 mm. Most precipitation occurs between July and September, during the south-west monsoon.

Annual rainfall by taluka (mm)(Abbreviations DU = Data unavailable, TNC = Taluka not created)
Year	Mithi	Islamkot	Diplo	Kaloi	Chachro	Dahli	Nagarparkar
2014	180	167	233	TNC	97	TNC	243
2015	422	362	512	TNC	363	126	588
2016	DU	DU	DU	DU	DU	DU	DU
2017	261	337	379	151	121	123	324
2018	158	124	151	110	110	120	140

Since 1997 the highest recorded annual rainfall was 1306 mm in 2011. Tharparkar has been suffering a drought for several decades and the provincial government has declared Tharparkar as a drought-affected area. Tharparkar was officially declared as in a drought in 1968, 1978, 1985, 1986, 1987, 1995, 1996, 1999, 2001, 2004, 2005, 2007, 2012, 2013, 2014, 2015 and 2018.

=== Flora ===
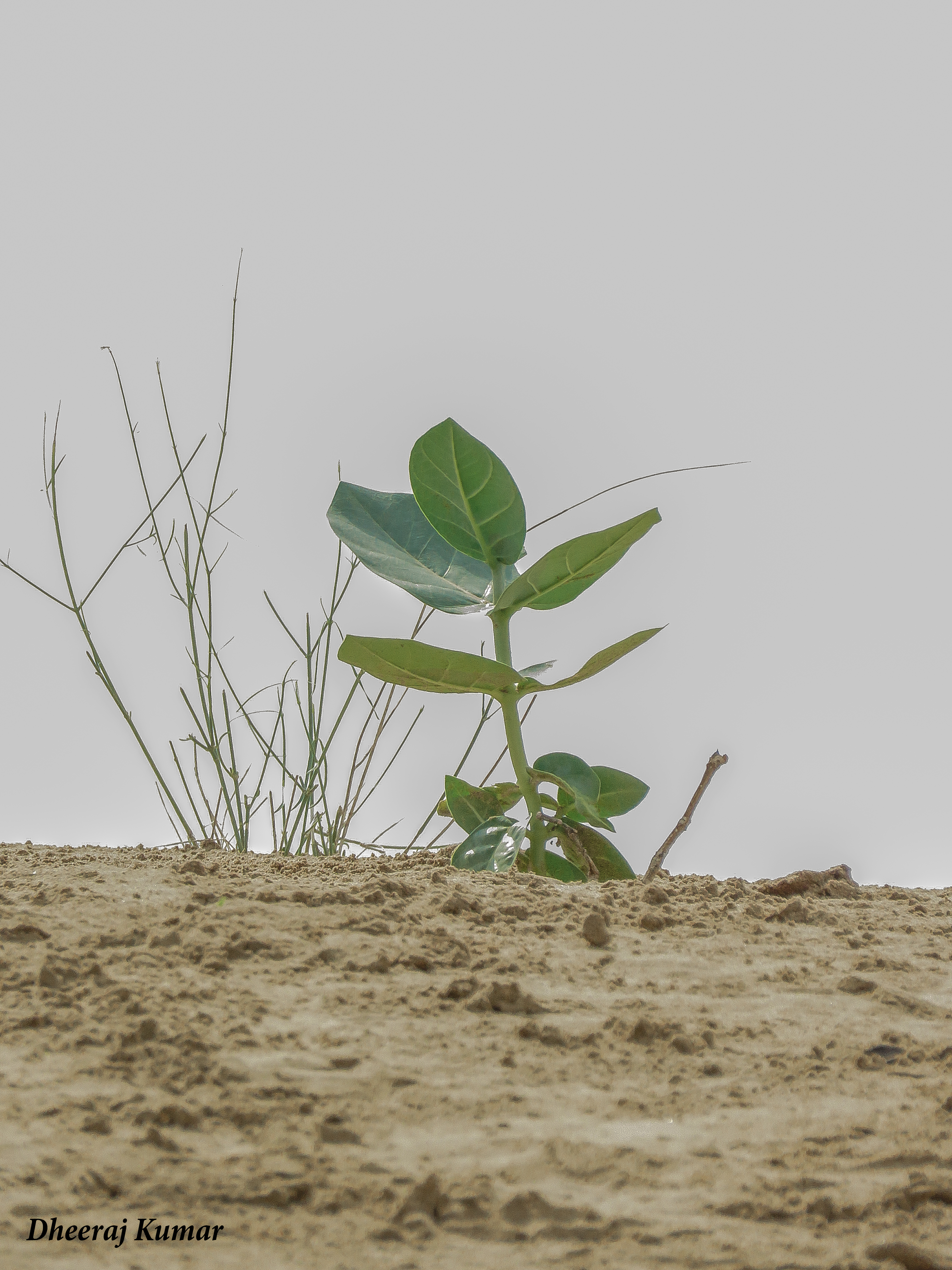
A type of crown flower, known locally as Ak, growing in Tharparkar.

There are at least 89 plant species of 26 plant families native to Tharparkar. Many species of herbs grow during the wet season while desert shrubs and drought resistant trees grow year-round.

=== Fauna ===
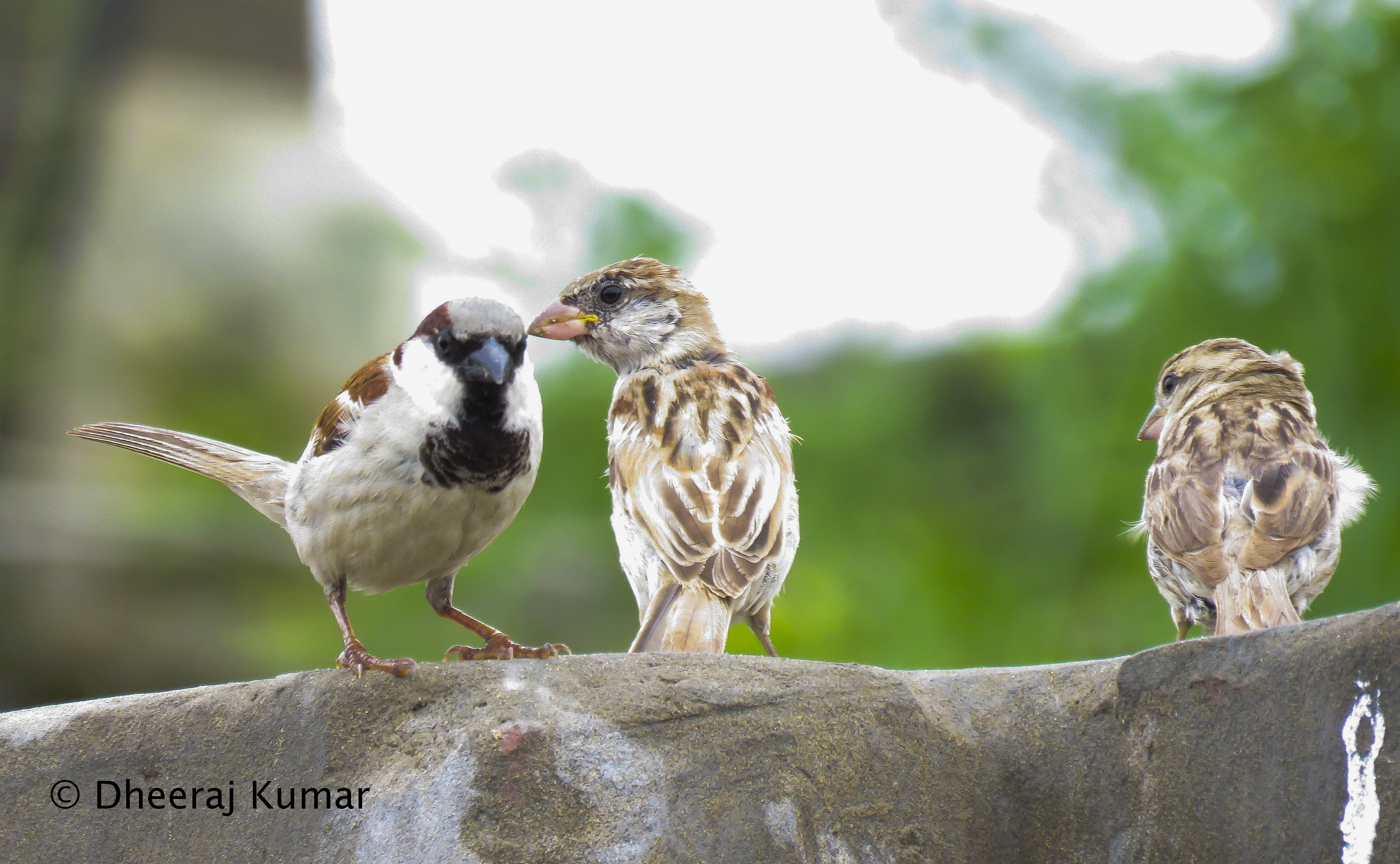
Sparrows in Tharparkar

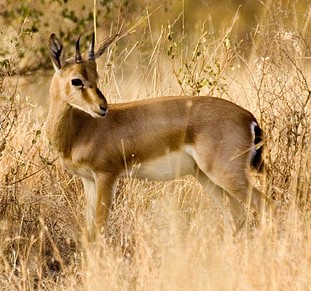
A chinkara, also known as the Indian gazelle

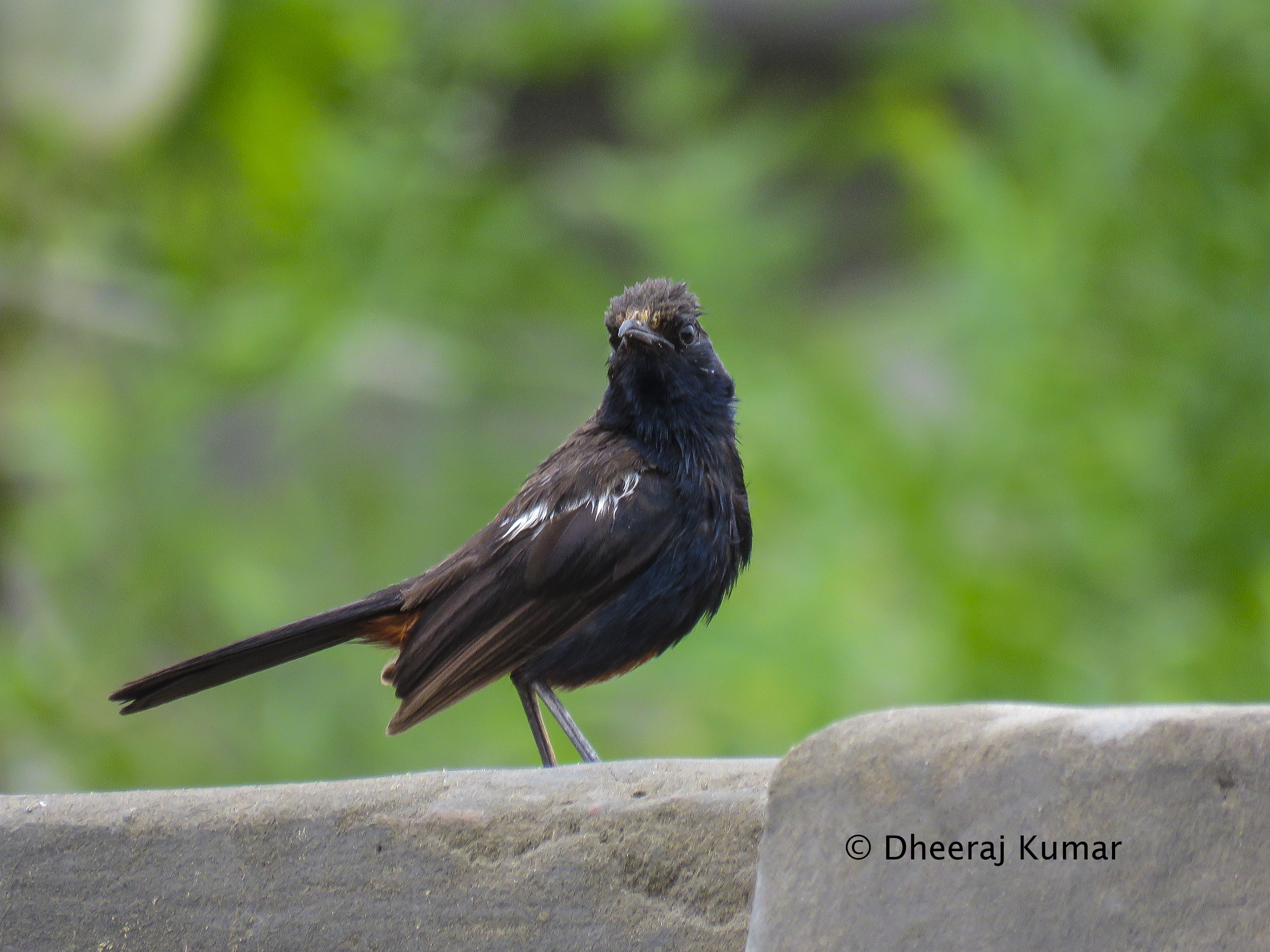
An Indian robin in Tharparkar

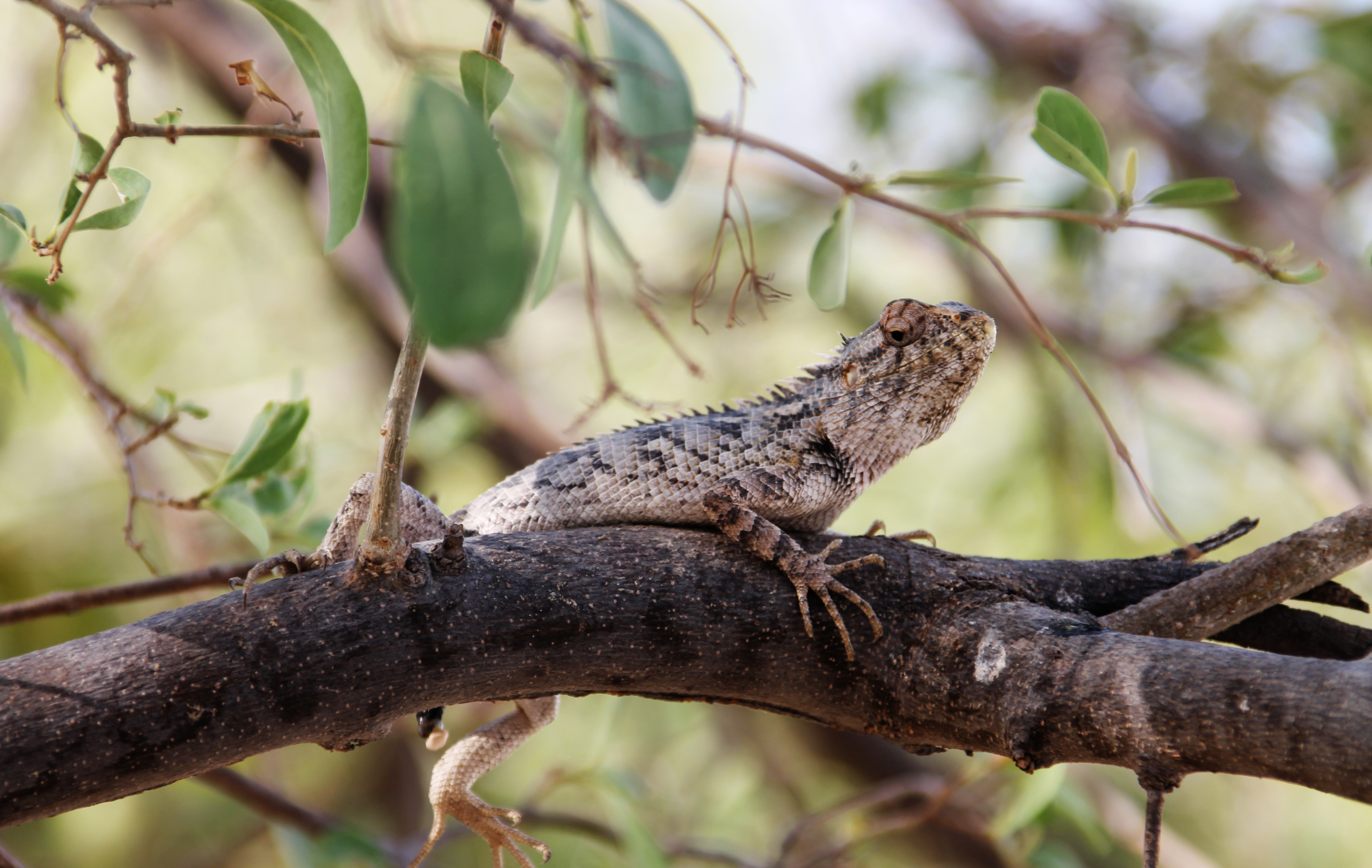
A Tharparkar lizard resting on a branch

Wealth of fauna is considered as a salient feature of this region.The fauna of Tharparkar is a major part of its culture, folk music, art etc.

=== Sanctuaries ===
==== Chinkara wildlife sanctuary ====
The Chinkara Wildlife Sanctuary covers 940 km^{2} in Tharparkar where the hunting of wildlife and poaching is prohibited. The prohibition extends from Chelhar in the north, to Bhorelo in the southeast, and to Mithi and Wajatto in the west.

==== Vulture and migratory birds sanctuary ====
Tharparkar has been designated a major sanctuary for endangered species of vulture, while Gorano has been declared a habitat for several migratory birds.

Peafowl conservation efforts in the district focus on preventing the further endangerment and death of animals that are significant as symbols of Tharparkar. In addition, illegal exploitation of scorpions and snakes has been reported in the area.

== Livelihood ==
Tharparkar district is predominantly rural, with 96% of the population residing outside of urban areas. The primary economic activity of the district is agriculture, while the much smaller urban population carries out activities related to agriculture. While the main food source and economic base of Tharparkar comes from livestock management, farming and artisanry are also important factors.

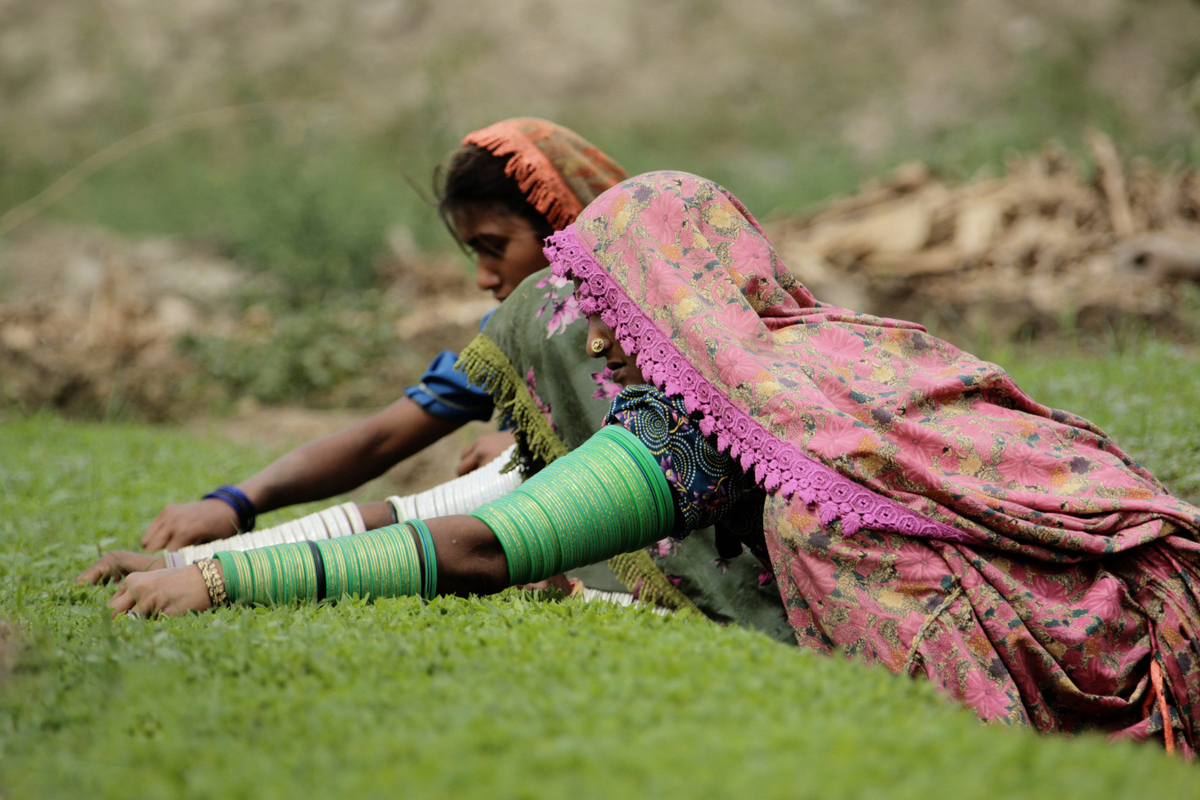
Thari women working in a field

=== Farming ===
Despite the arid climate and generally poor conditions for growing crops, the majority of the Thari people are employed by some form of farming. Most of the area relies on scant rainfall to irrigate farmland, however, in some areas of Nagarparkar taluka, tube wells are used. 1,014,000 (50.4%) of the district's 2,011,000 hectares of land are cultivated.

=== Livestock ===
94% of the district's households own some form of livestock, while 77.64% of the population is actively engaged in livestock management. The average household owns 8 animals, and an estimated 7.7 million animals make up the total livestock population of the district. Sheep are especially important to the district's livestock economy, with 3 million kg of wool produced annually. Tharparkar holds 40% of Sindh's sheep population, and is considered the most suitable area for sheep in the province. 70.3% of farms use animals as a source of power for plowing land. The percentage of donkeys in the livestock population is notably high, especially for an arid region, with the percentage in Tharparkar being higher than other areas in Pakistan. Despite the size and economic importance of the livestock population, only 12 veterinarians serve the district.

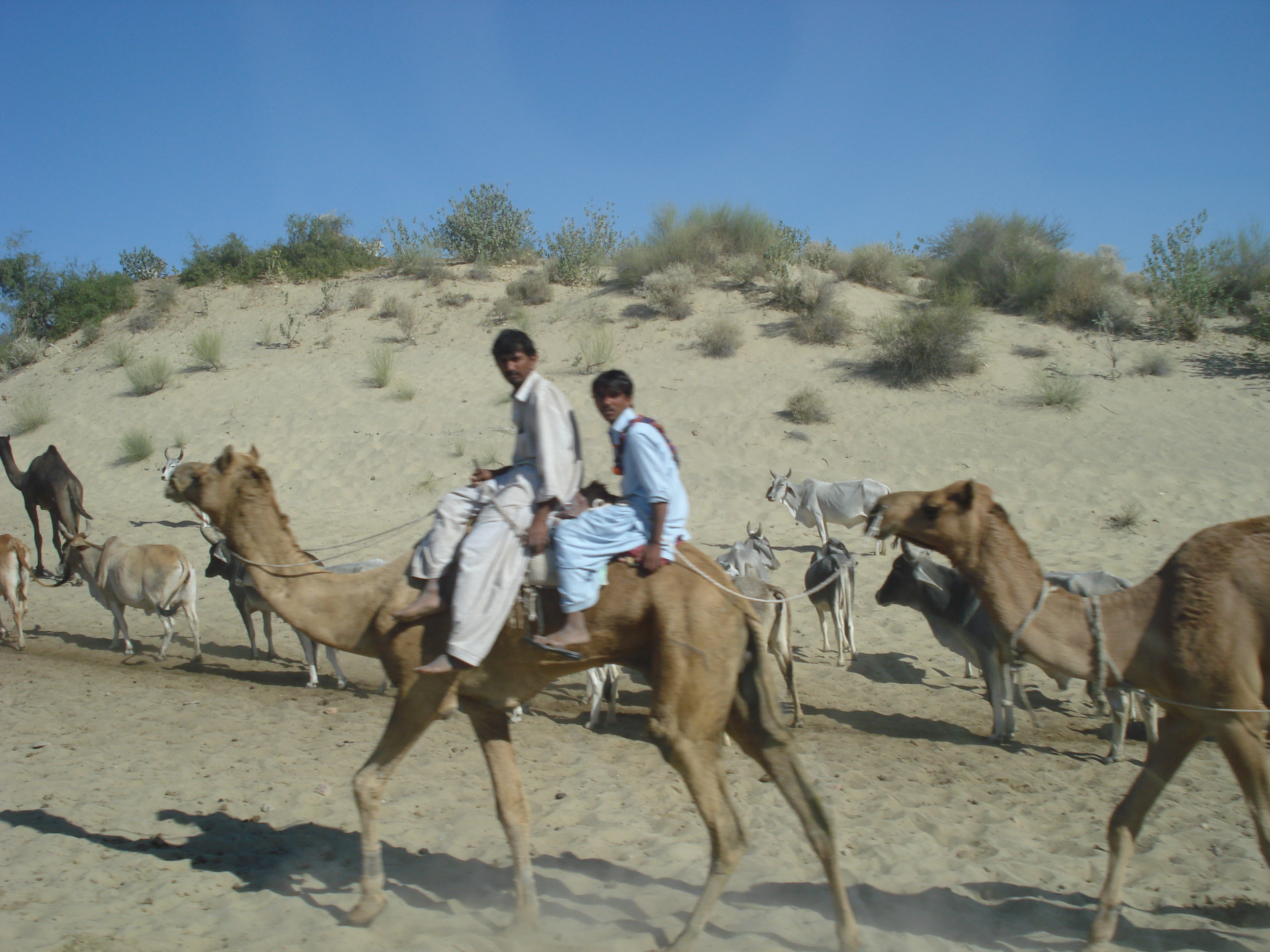
Thari camel herd

Tharparkar livestock populations and notable breeds (2006)
Livestock	Population	Breeds
Cattle	752,265	Tharparkar, Kankrej
Buffalo	46,328	Kundhi
Sheep	1,185,122	Kooka, Magra, Sonadi, Kachhi, Marwari
Goat	2,217,876	Tharki, Kamori, Chappar
Camel	135,356	Dhatti
Horse	8,519	Baluchi
Mule	1,475	
Donkey	246,657	Ghudkhur
Domestic Poultry	263,431	
Total	4,857,029	

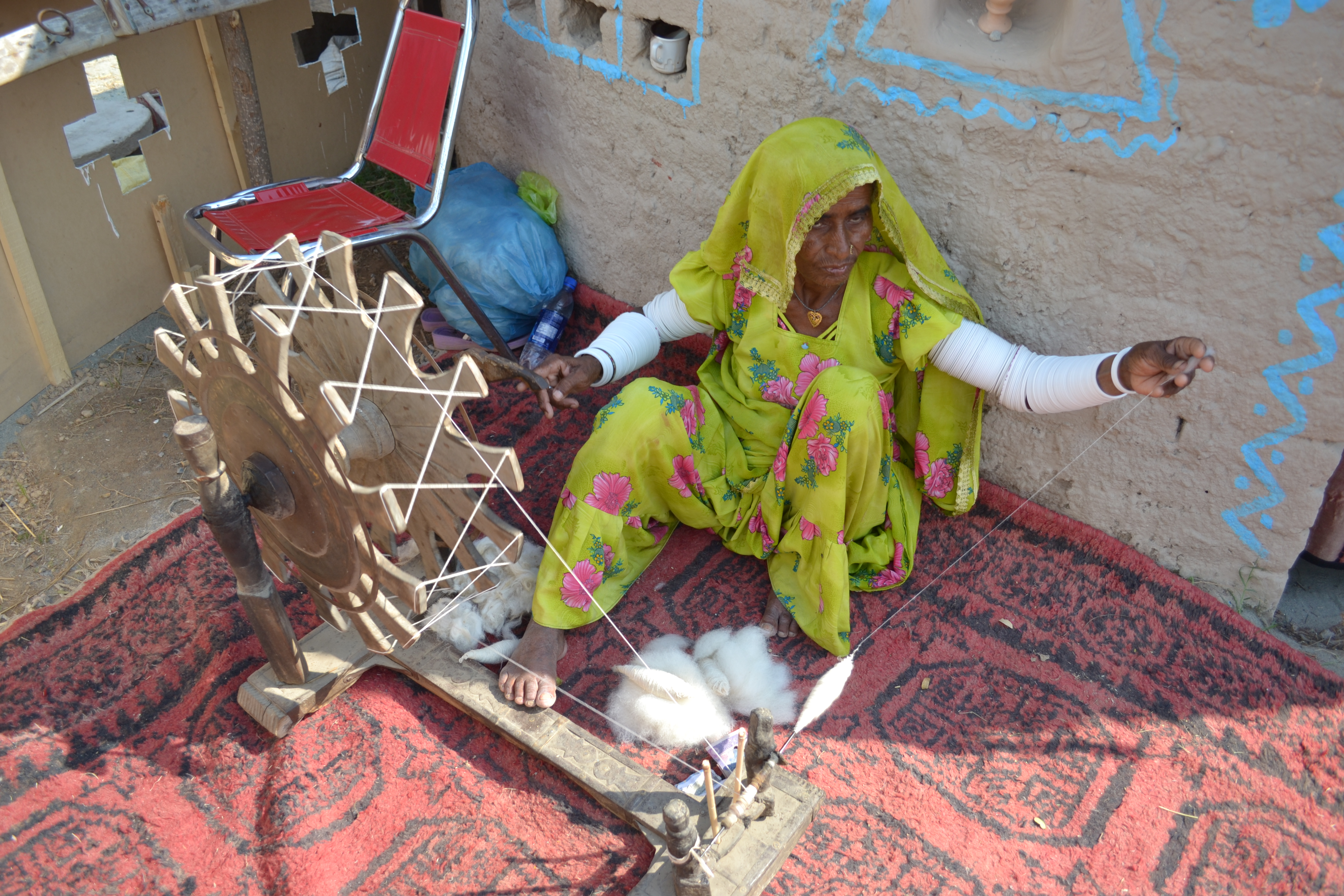
Thari woman working on a Charkha (spinning wheel)

=== Handicrafts ===
Art and artisanry have been part of Thari society since the Indus Valley civilisation. Common handicrafts include ralli, pottery, puppet-making, carpet-making, traditional decoration, block printing, cobbling, and embroidery, among others. In Chachro taluka alone there are 6,000 handlooms, despite the lack of a centralized facility. The sale of these products supplement local incomes, and provide economic opportunities, especially for women.

== Politics ==
Between 2002 and 2018, the district was represented in the Provincial Assembly of Sindh by constituencies 60, 61, 62, and 63. The 2008 elections saw three of those constituencies represented by members of the Pakistan Muslim League (Q) (PMLQ), and one by a member of the Pakistan Peoples Party (PPP). During the 2013 elections, three candidates from the PPP and one from the Pakistan Muslim League (N) won.

Before 2018, Tharparkar was represented in the National Assembly by constituencies 229 and 230. During the 2008 elections, both were won by candidates of the PMLQ, while in the 2013 elections, they were both won by candidates of the PPP.

After a new delimitation of constituencies in 2018, the district is represented in the Provincial Assembly by constituencies 54, 55, 56, and 57, while in the National Assembly, it is represented by constituencies 221 and 222. In the 2018 elections, both national constituencies and three of the four provincial constituencies were won by the PPP, while one provincial seat was won by the Grand Democratic Alliance.

== Industry and infrastructure ==
=== Industry ===
==== Coal ====
Pakistan's estimated 185.175 billion tonnes of lignite coal reserves are the 7th largest in the world. Tharparkar district alone is estimated to hold 175.506 billion tonnes (95%) of the national reserves, the energy contents of which would surpass the combined energy of the resource reserves of Saudi Arabia and Iran.

In Pakistan, companies generating power are completely exempted from the payment of income tax, as well as turnover tax. Additionally, imports from prospective sponsors of coal power generation projects are exempted from tariffs. This is done in order to encourage investment in the country's energy sector. Such investments have included a 600 MW producing project implemented by the Chinese Shenhua Group, and the 1200 MW producing Thar Engro Coal Power Project.

In Pakistan, mineral mining operations are subject to provincial administration. However, in 2011, to encourage large-scale investment in coal mining, the federal government authorized the creation of the "Thar Coal & Energy Board" (TCEB), a statutory corporation that would directly administer the extraction and use of Tharparkar's large energy resources.

In March 2019, new members were appointed to the TCEB including female Member of National Assembly (MNA) Shazia Marri (NA-216). However, the TCEB's charter requires that there should be one female MNA from either Tharparkar, Umerkot or Mirpur Khas districts on the board. An exception was made, as MNA Mahesh Malani and Senator Krishna Kohli were from and represented the Thar region, despite neither directly fitting the "female MNA from Thar" requirement.

The Sindh Engro Coal Mining Company in Tharparkar supplies electricity to the national grid. Despite this, the large majority of the 2,300 registered and almost 2,000 unregistered Thari villages have no electricity supply. Energy shortages and blackouts are common, and one outage during a heat wave lasting 22 hours resulted in the deaths of several hospital patients. An informal announcement made by the Sindh government declared that electricity would be freely provided to Tharparkar, however this has not happened, and electricity continues to be supplied by private companies such as Hyderabad Electric Supply Company.

Several entities have raised issues of potential environmental and health impacts that could result from extensive coal mining and use. The pollution and harm to the environment caused by coal mining and use in the region have led to destruction of habitat, as well as the large-scale displacement of local communities. Health effects of lignite pollution include increases in the risk of cancer, as well as heart and lung problems. Social movements, which some Thari people are involved in, have hoped to address these challenges.

==== Solar ====
Solar potential of Tharparkar compared to Bahawalpur (having Pakistan's largest solar power plant)

Bahawalpur district's Quaid-e-Azam Solar Park, the largest photovoltaic power station in Pakistan, has a photovoltaic electricity output (PVOUT) of 1596 kWh/kWp per year and a global horizontal irradiance (GHI) of 1925 kWh/m^{2} per year. In comparison, Tharparkar has a PVOUT of 1642 kWh/kWp per year and a GHI of 2005 kWh/m^{2} per year.

In January 2015, at a cost of US$2.98 million the largest solar reverse osmosis plant in Asia was completed in Mithi with the ability to filter two million gallons of water daily. Throughout the district, smaller plants, each with filtration capacities of 10,000 gallons per day were installed at cost of around US$24,900 each. These plants were the result of cooperation between the Sindh provincial government and Pak Oasis, a water treatment company. Despite such initiatives, much of the arid region continues to suffer from a lack of clean drinking water, resulting in sickness and death.

The efficacy, political motivations, and administration of these plants have been called into question, and as a result of a four-month lapse in pay, workers went on strike in October 2018, causing a significant water crisis.

In July 2018, Pakistan's National Accountability Bureau began an investigation of an alleged illegal awarding of a contract to Pak Oasis. Allegations included a premature payment of Rs 5 billion to Pak Oasis prior to their completion of a water treatment project.

In October 2018, the Chief Minister of Sindh authorized the use of Rs 336.7 million for the construction of 110 reverse osmosis plants. In November 2018, Sindh Government decided to take over all RO plants in Thar Coal Block-II.

On 16 April 2019, MPA Sidra Imran claimed in a speech in the Provincial Assembly of Sindh that 700 solar reverse osmosis plants, worth Rs 8 billion, were not functional.

=== Transportation ===
==== Road ====
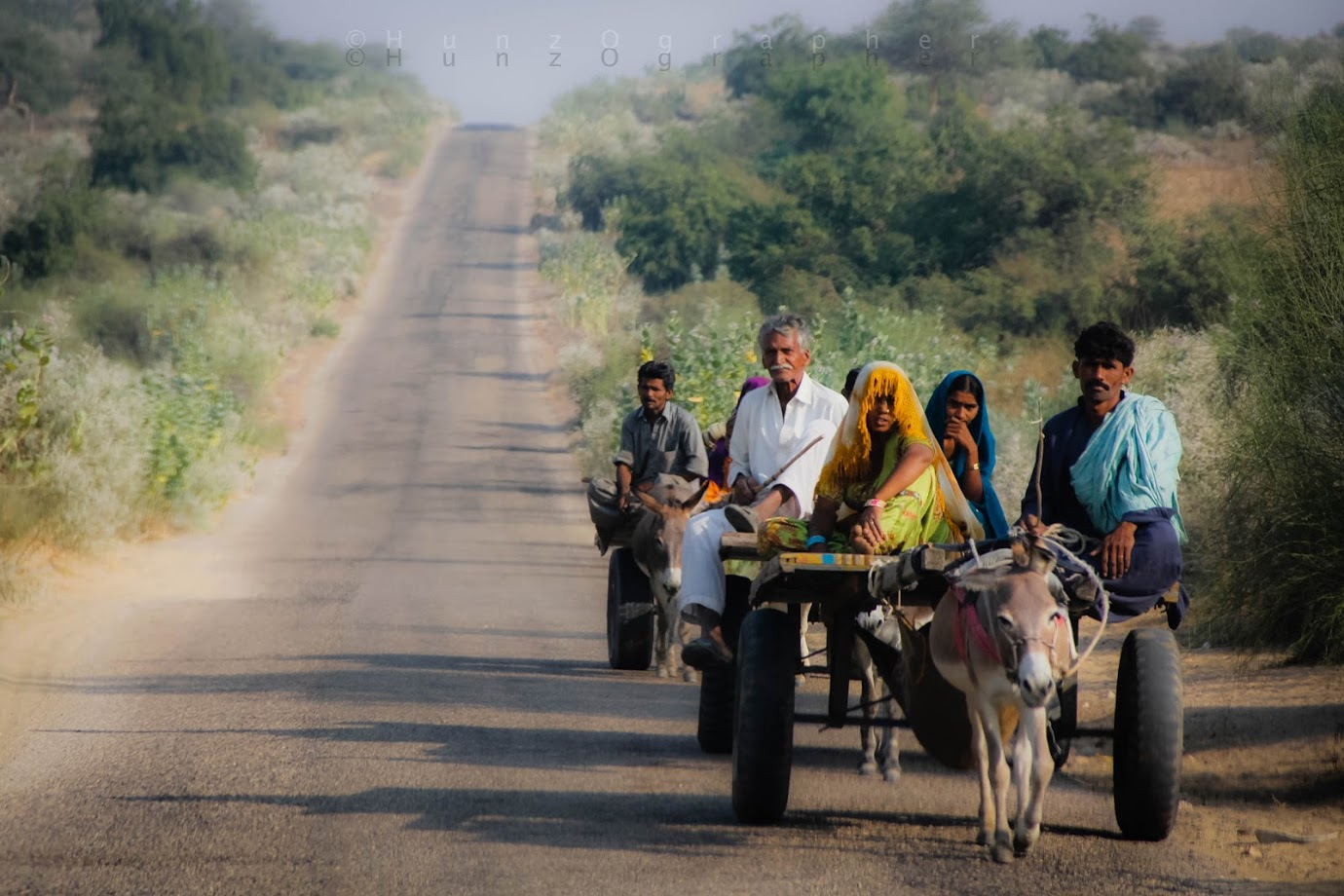
Donkey-drawn cart used for transportation

Only 743 km of quality roads run through the 19,638 km^{2} of Tharaparkar district, considered inadequate by the standards of several NGOs. Major cities of the province are connected by a highway, and the talukas of the district are connected to the district headquarters of Mithi by several metaled roads.

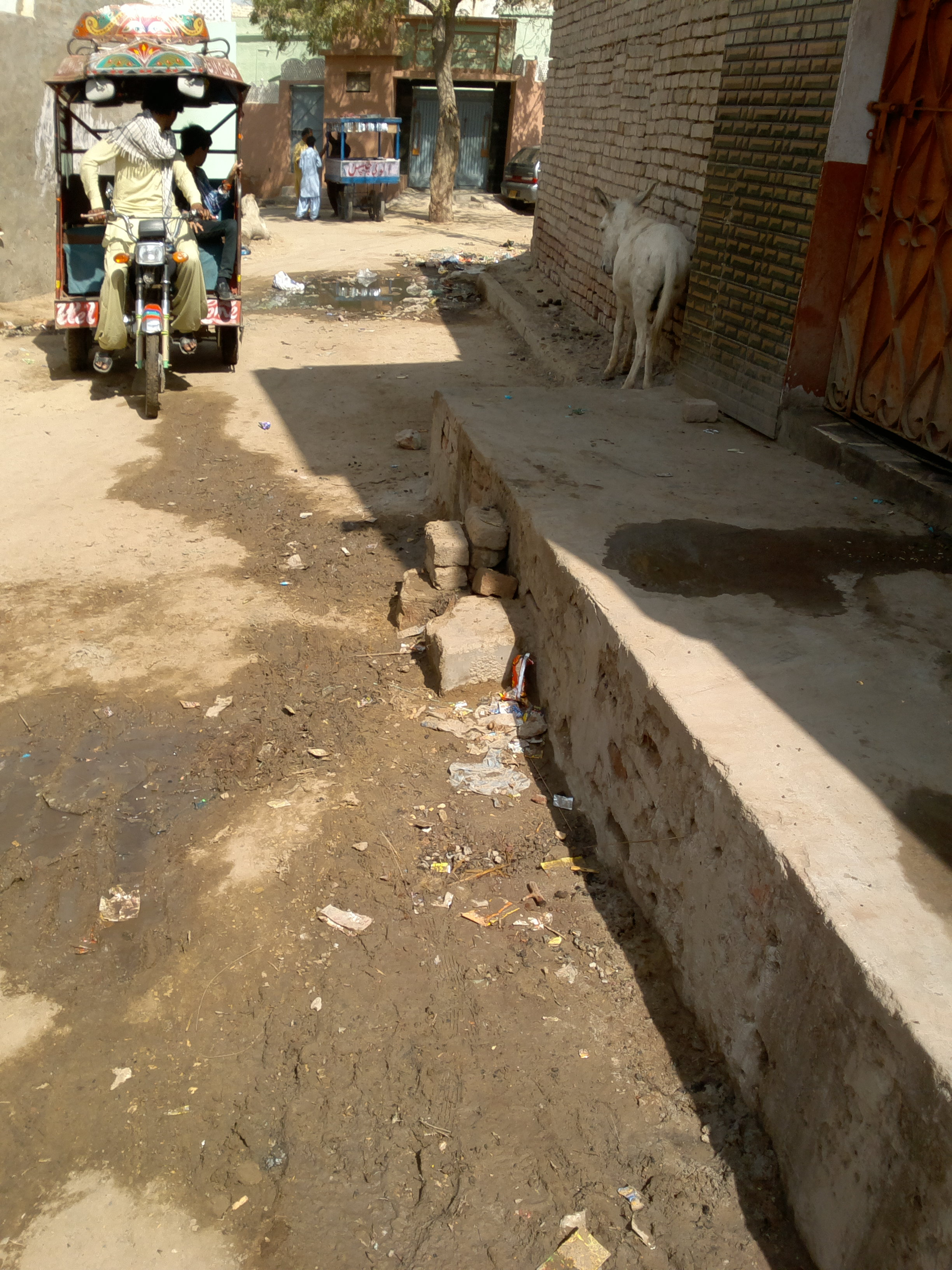
Local chinchi (rickshaw) transportation

Lengths of road journeys between selected cities and Mithi
Destination	Road (km)
Karachi (via Thatta / Badin)	300
Karachi (via Hyderabad / Mirpurkhas)	400
Karachi (via Mirpurkhas / Umerkot)	425
Nagarparkar	150
Badin	100
Naukot	50
Umerkot	85

==== Airport ====
The Civil Aviation Authority of Pakistan (PCAA) constructed an airport in Islamkot at a cost of around Rs 972.07 million. The Islamkot International Airport covers 1,000 acres and has a 3 km long runway, and serves both civilian and military air traffic. The Sindh Coal Authority requested the construction of the airport, as the new infrastructure would contribute to the development of the nearby Thar coalfield.

The airport lies within 80 km (50 mi) of Pakistan's border with India, and clearance for the construction of the airport was given by the Pakistani Ministry of Defence on 25 September 2009. The airport was first inaugurated on 17 July 2017 by Chief Minister Murad Ali Shah as Thar Airport. It was inaugurated again on 11 April 2018 by Bilawal Bhutto Zardari, when its name was changed to Mai Bakhtawar Airport. However, the PCAA does not recognize the airport, and the airport, which has no official website, lacks an official ICAO or IATA code.

==== Railway ====
Before the partition of India and creation of Pakistan in 1947, the Sind Mail ran between Hyderabad, Pakistan and Ahmedabad, India via Mirpur Khas, Khokhropar, Munabao, Barmer, Luni, Jodhpur, Pali, Marwar and Palanpur. Post-partition, service continued on the line, with Khokhropar railway station, the last station in Pakistan, used for customs. However, service on that line was stopped after the Indo-Pakistani War of 1965. The town of Khokhropar and the rest of the Nagarparkar salient were captured by India in the Indo-Pakistani War of 1971, but were returned to Pakistan in 1972.

On 18 February 2006, after a 41-year suspension, service on the Hyderabad - Jodhpur railway line resumed after the conversion of metre gauge track to broad gauge track. The newly constructed Zero Point railway station near the border town of Khokhropar in Dahli taluka is now the last station in Pakistan on the Hyderabad - Jodhpur line, and so is used in customs enforcement.

The Thar Express, which runs weekly between Karachi and Jodhpur, is operated by Pakistan Railways and Indian Railways. The 700 km journey takes a relatively long 32 hours, and so is nicknamed the 'torture train' by some passengers.

Despite formal Thari petitions for rail service to facilitate migration during drought, government efforts focus on the improvement of coal mining infrastructure.

=== Telecommunications ===
In March 2009, the Pakistani Ministry of Information Technology's Universal Service Fund awarded a Rs 930 million contract to Telenor Pakistan for the building of basic telephone and data infrastructure in Tharparkar.

In March 2017, Sindh Engro Coal Mining Company, in partnership with Wateen Telecom, introduced free Wi-Fi to two villages, as the first stage of a larger initiative. The villages of Tharyo Halepoto and Senhri Dars near Islamkot were provided with 3 Mbit/s internet service at no charge. A second phase of the initiative aims to provide the same service to all schools in Thar Coal Block II. Future phases aim to extend service to the entirety of Thar Coal Block II. Questions have been raised about the scale of benefits of free Wi-Fi to a district where 87% of the population lives in absolute poverty.

Paid telecommunications services in Tharparkar are dominated by Pakistan Telecommunication Company Limited (PTCL), which has a monopoly on telecommunication in Pakistan.

=== Water resources ===
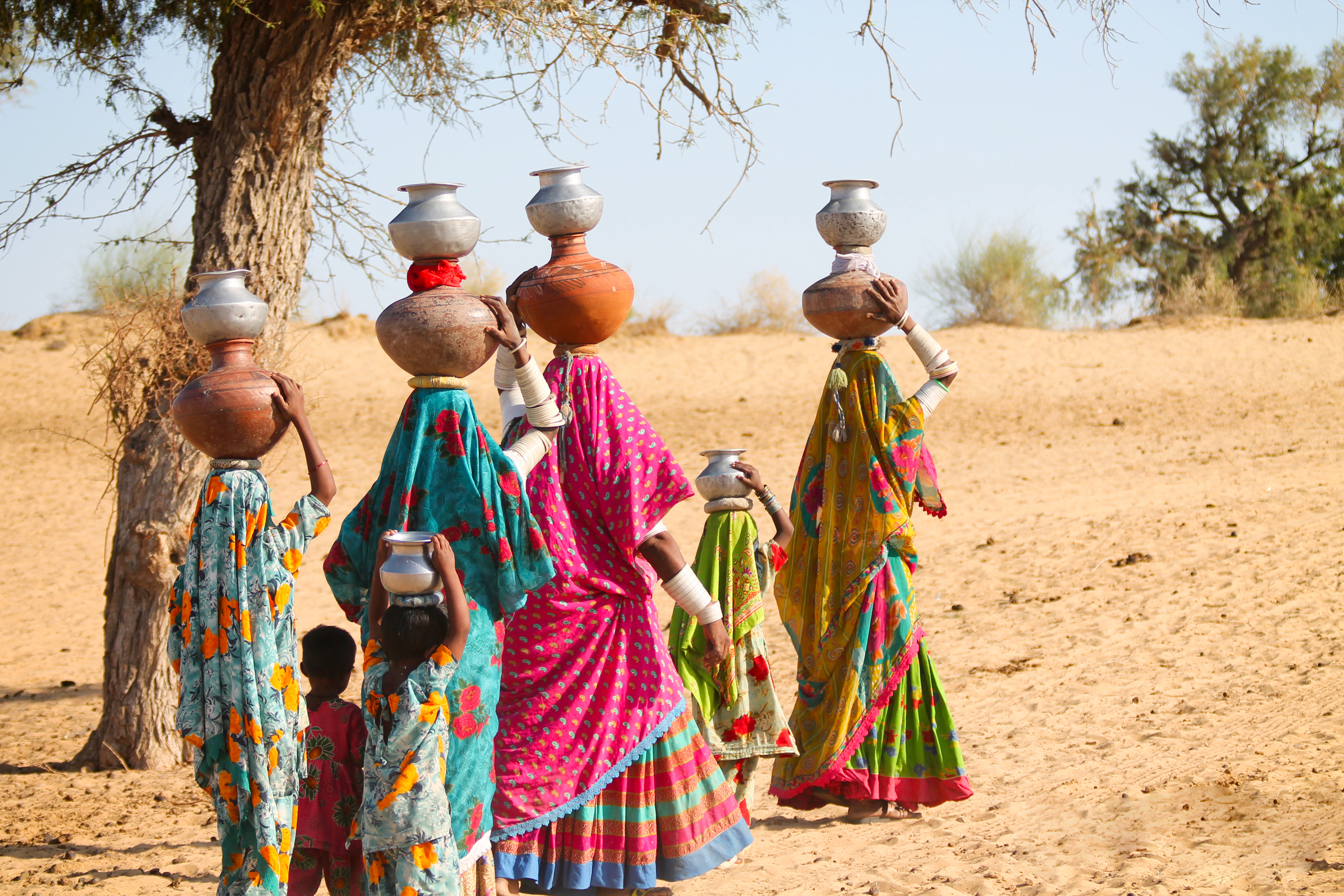
Women and children fetching water

Access to drinking water in Tharparkar is very poor. Only 47% of the population has access to drinking water. Wells are crowded and their supply strained, as 60% of households wait more than an hour at wells for their turn, and 30% households spend more than Rs 30 for two buckets of water. 85% of households use Pakhaal (rubber bags carried by a camel or donkey) to carry water, while 25% use buckets carried by camel or donkey. In some areas, single journeys for water may take as long as two days. 75% of women travel an average 3 km per trip, spending 52% of their working hours fetching water.

Water Delivery System in Tharparkar(Percentage of households)
Type	2010-11			2014-15		
Type	Total	Urban	Rural	Total	Urban	Rural
Tap Water	13	79	10	6	67	1
Hand Pump	2	1	2	7	9	7
Motor Pump	2	20	1	3	0	4
Dug Well	77	0	81	75	20	79
Others	5	0	0	8	3	9

=== Sanitation ===
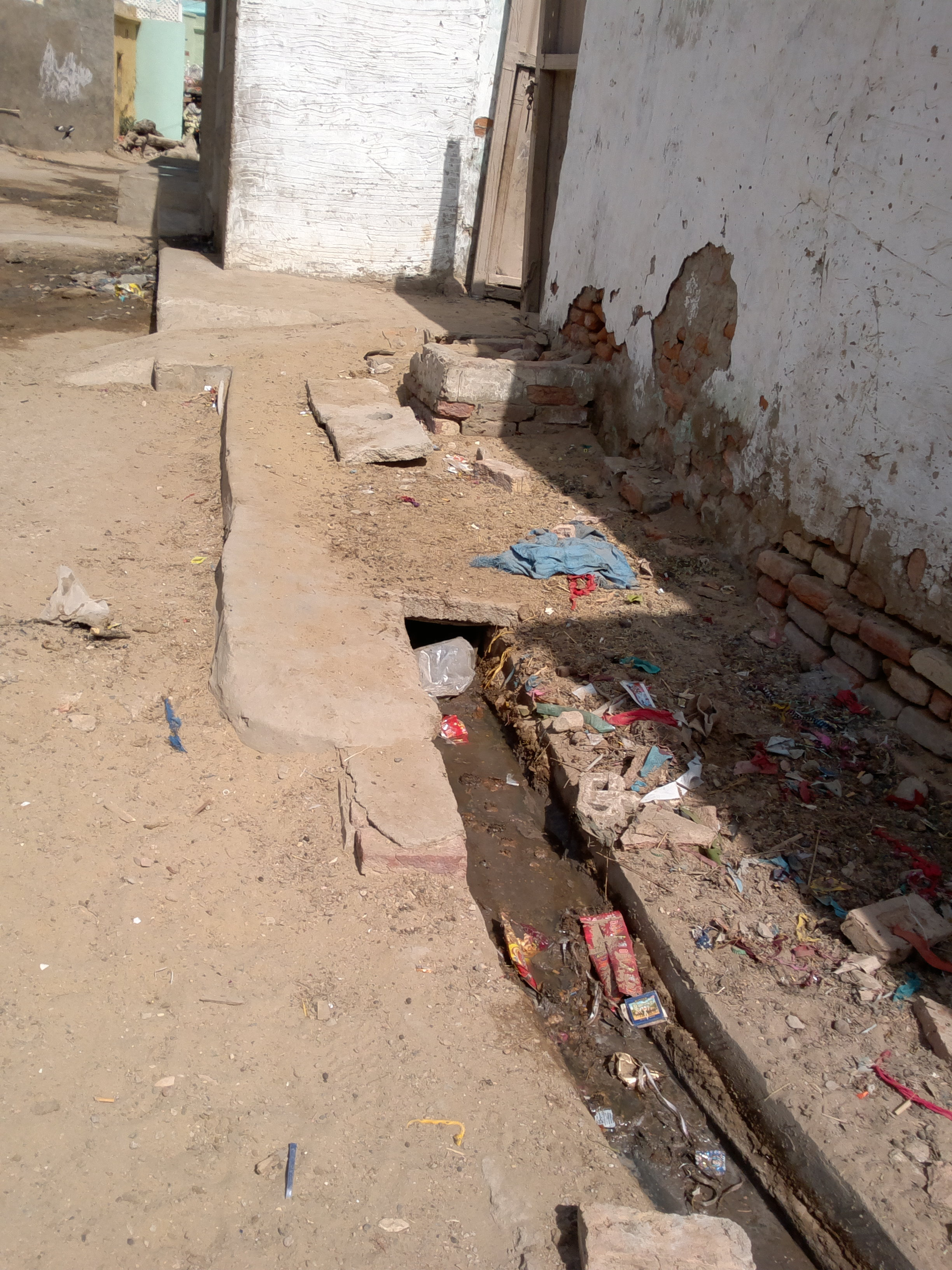
A sewage ditch in Islamkot

Precise data on solid-waste management are unavailable but basic waste management is present in the urban parts of the district. However, rural areas, which host 96% of the district population, lack such facilities. 44% of households in Tharparkar have no toilets, the highest percentage of any district in Sindh.

Toilet facilities by percentage of households
Flush			Non Flush			No Toilet		
Urban	Rural	Total	Urban	Rural	Total	Urban	Rural	Total
78	7	12	19	46	44	3	47	44

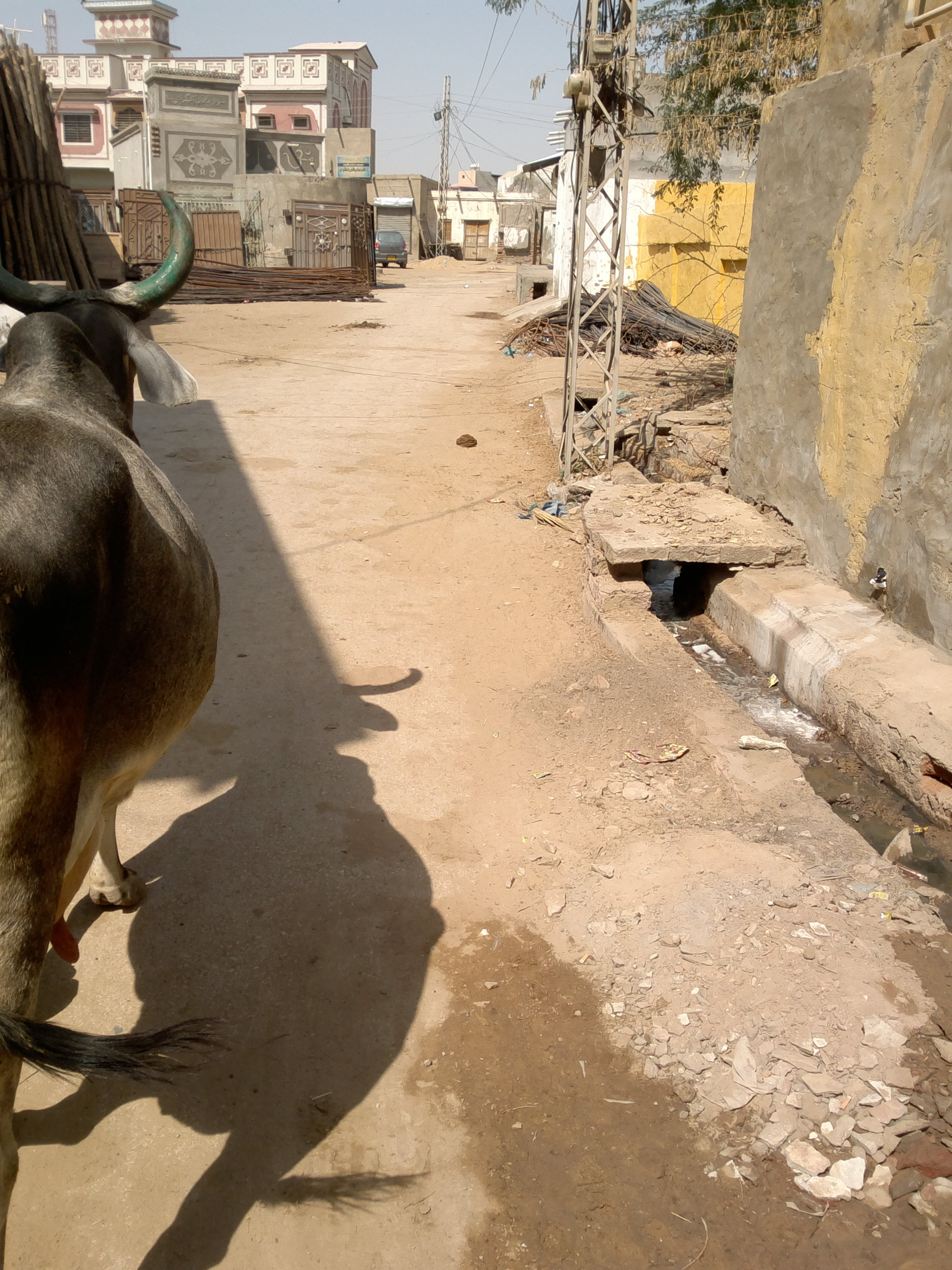
Electric poles on an Islamkot street

=== Electricity ===
Despite supplying much of Pakistan's energy supply through its coal reserves, only 39% of Thari households use electricity as their main lighting supply, the lowest percentage of any district in Sindh.

Energy supply for lighting by percentage of households
Electricity			Gas/Oil			Wood & Candle			Other		
Urban	Rural	Total	Urban	Rural	Total	Urban	Rural	Total	Urban	Rural	Total
93.44	34.06	38.55	0	10.24	9.47	0	14.42	13.33	6.56	41.28	38.65

=== Irrigation ===
As the district is mostly arid, its irrigation system is small. Only 1.6% of the district's cultivated land is irrigated, mostly in Diplo taluka by a tributary of the Naukot branch of Nara Canal. Irrigation is most extensive in Nagarparkar and Mithi, where much of the land is fed by tube wells.

=== Fuel ===
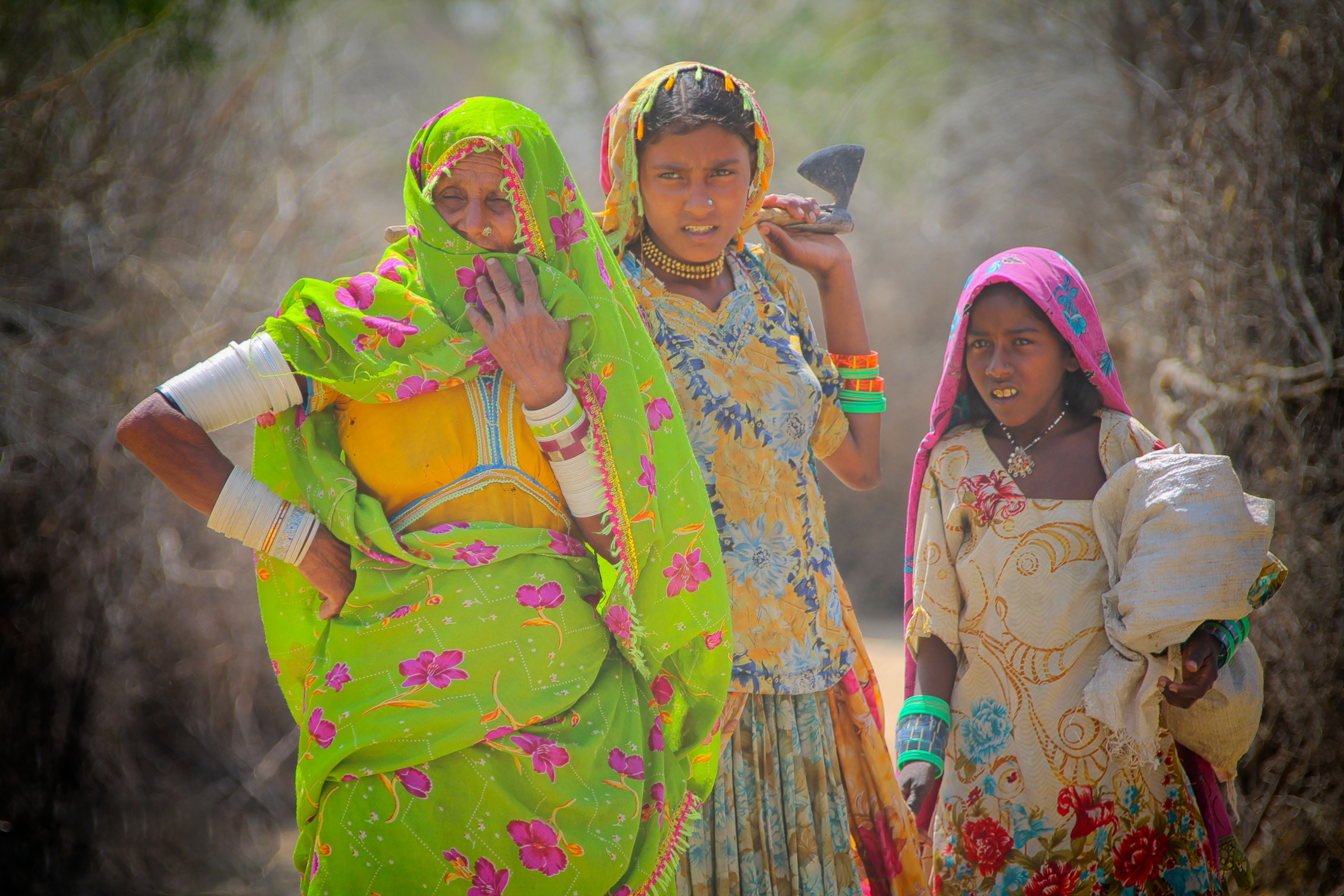
Women set out to collect firewood

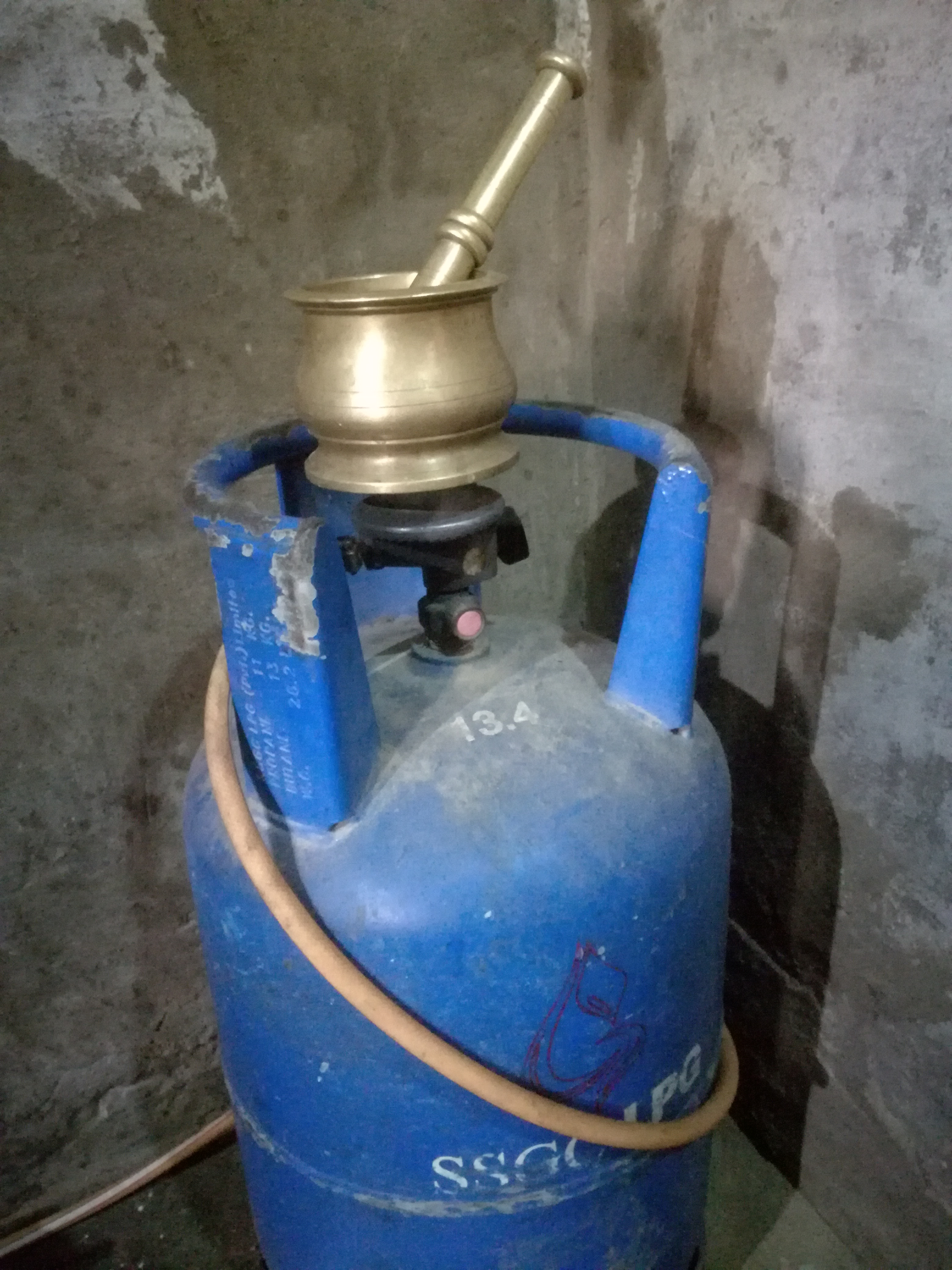
An example of Jugaad

In Tharparkar, 99% of households use firewood as the main fuel supply for cooking. The deforestation resulting from large-scale firewood harvesting is a potential contributor to Tharparkar's drought issues. The second largest supply is gas, which 0.7% of households use. Most gas use is in Tharparkar's smaller urban communities. Gas infrastructure is poorly developed, and gas cylinder safety is questionable, which has led to some accidents. One common solution to gas safety problems used in Tharparkar is the Jugaad practice of placing a heavy object on top of a faulty valve, to prevent gas from leaking.

Fuel supply for cooking by percentage of households
Gas			Wood/Sticks			Oil			Other		
Urban	Rural	Total	Urban	Rural	Total	Urban	Rural	Total	Urban	Rural	Total
9.36	0	0.71	90.64	99.76	99.07	0	0.08	0.07	0	0.16	0.15

== Finance, banking and taxation ==
=== Finance ===
Tharparkar's importance to the Sindh and Pakistani economies is mostly based in its energy reserves and its status as the energy capital of Pakistan. During the September 2019 Pakistan Renewable Energy Summit, President Arif Alvi reemphasized the importance of fully utilizing the coal reserves discovered in Tharparkar. To fulfill this aim, the Sindh government called for further Australian investment in Thar coal, and auctioned off 4 coal mining blocks worth between US$4–6 billion.

Chinese investment in the district includes a US$2 billion investment from the Chinese state-owned Shanghai Electric Power Company Limited. As of November 2019, Pakistan and China have agreed to expand the scope of the China–Pakistan Economic Corridor to include copper, gold, oil, gas, and housing sectors.

In 2019, the Manila-based Asian Development Bank approved a $75 million loan for investment in the Sindhi education system. Also in 2019, the World Bank approved a $1.93 billion loan to Sindh to be used in several initiatives with various goals, including the development of Tharparkar's rural economy. Since, this occurred just after Sindh CM was summoned by the National Accountability Bureau (NAB) in graft probe, has raised concerns among people. However, questions have been raised about possible misuse of such funding.

Industrial investments in the district have been promoted by the government, with important economic incentives having been implemented in Tharparkar to attract businesses. Serious issues of industrial slave labor and worker exploitation exist in the district.

=== Banking ===
Like the rest of Pakistan, domestic banking in Tharparkar is conducted interest-free as a result of previous Islamization of banking. However, foreign loans and deposits of foreign currency do incur interest. Most banks in Tharparkar are concentrated within urban centers such as Mithi, and are closed on Saturdays and Sundays. Online banking services in the district are limited.

=== Taxation ===
All personal and corporate incomes are taxed by the federal government except income from agriculture which is taxed by provincial governments. In Sindh, Board of Revenue (BOR) collects all tax revenue of the Government of Sindh. As per Sindh Agricultural Income Tax Act of 2000, no land tax is levied in the Thar Desert and the Kohistan areas. An amendment bill was passed by the Provincial Assembly of Sindh on 30 April 2018 and further formal notification was issued on 22 May 2018 for the same. The Sindh cabinet during same time also decided to amend the Sindh Arms Act, allowing people to keep more than four (as many weapons as desired) weapons. Further asset statements provided by legislators and senators for the year 2018 revealed alarming figures of arms and deadly-military weapons in their personal arsenals. Apart from this, Home secretary was summoned in sale of weapons on fake arms licenses case by an anti-terrorism court. In second week of November several reports described Federal Board of Revenue (FBR) is to be restructured and Prime Minister has proposed for replacement of FBR.

== Demographics ==
Historical population
Year	Pop.	±% p.a.
1951	249,280	—
1961	290,402	+1.54%
1972	359,357	+1.96%
1981	540,985	+4.65%
1998	914,291	+3.13%
2017	1,647,036	+3.15%
2023	1,778,407	+1.29%

As of the 2023 census, Tharparkar district has 327,584 households and a population of 1,778,407. The district has a sex ratio of 109.21 males to 100 females and a literacy rate of 36.39%: 48.50% for males and 23.49% for females. 689,148 (38.76% of the surveyed population) are under 10 years of age. 144,405 (8.12%) live in urban areas.

=== Religion ===
Religions in Tharparkar district (2023)
Religion	Percent
Islam	54.31%
Hinduism	45.64%
Other or not stated	0.05%

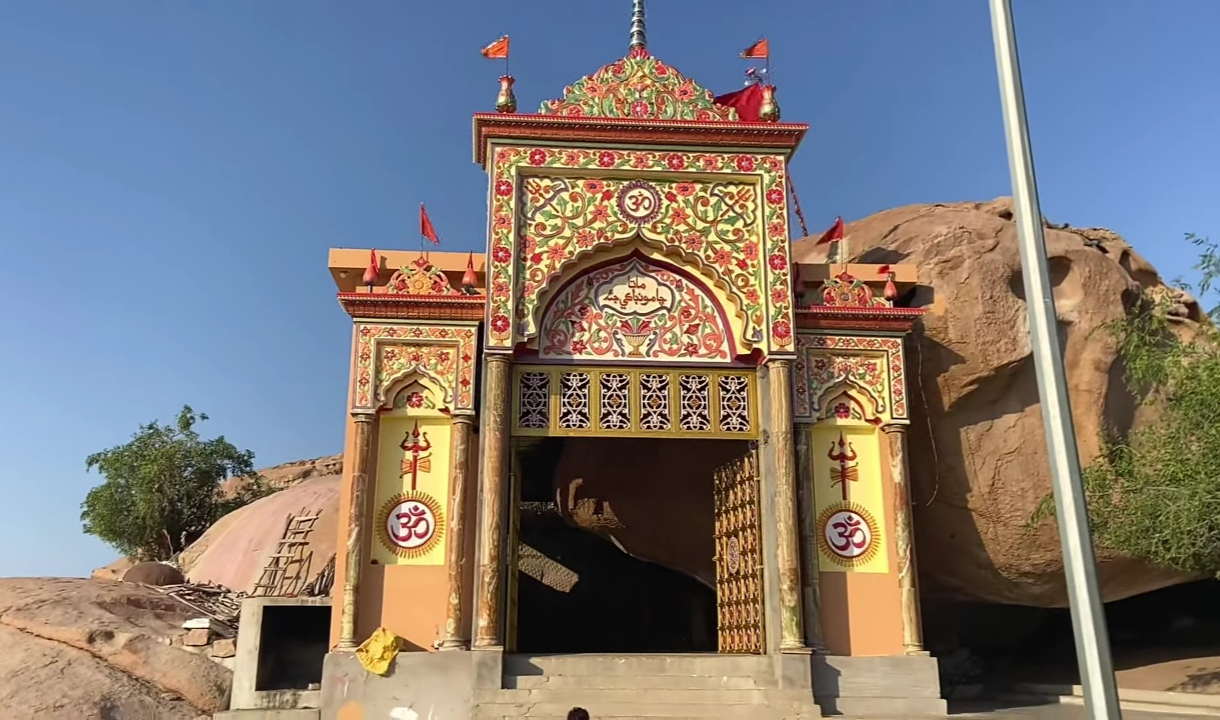
Churrio Jabal Durga Mata Temple, Tharparkar

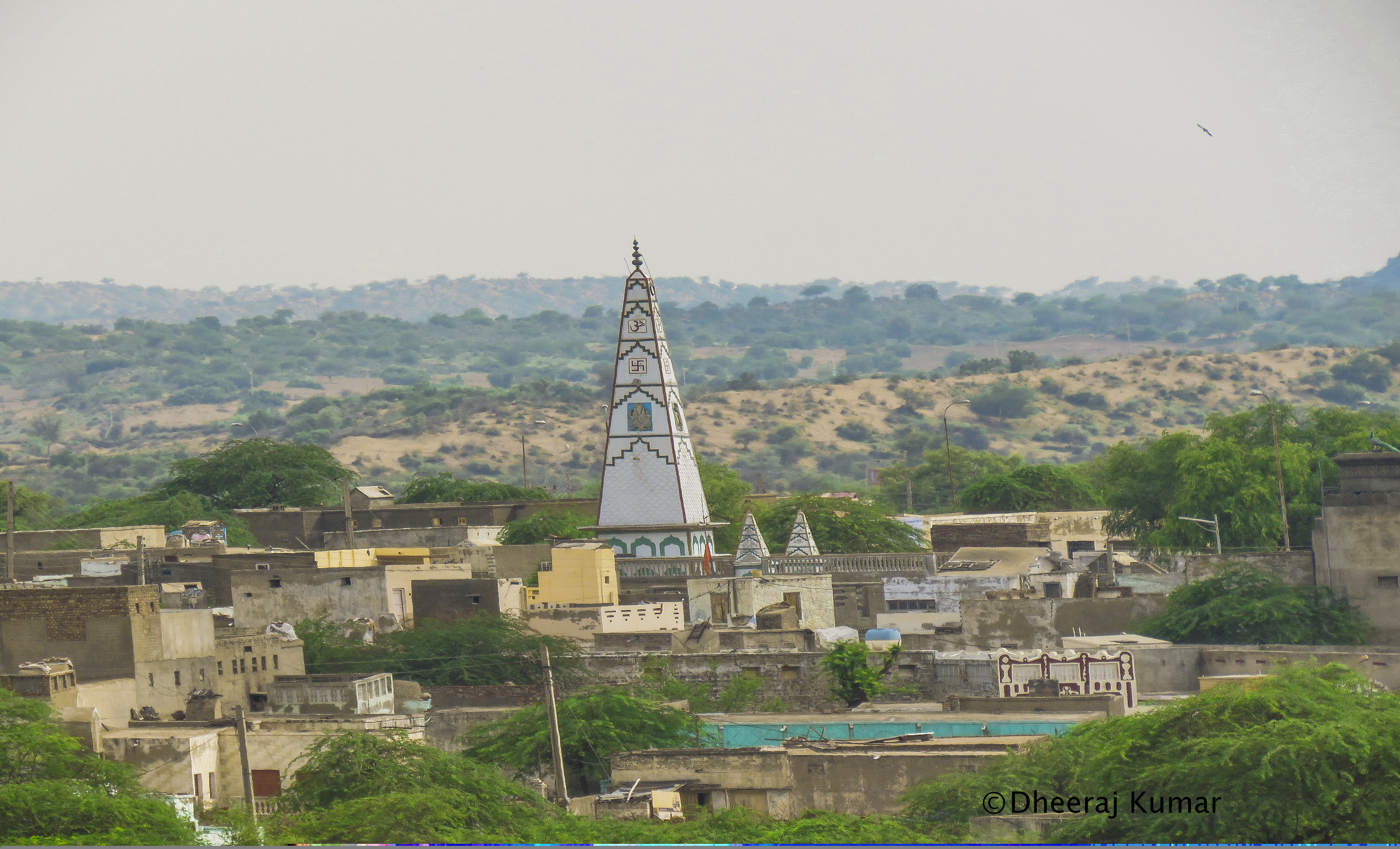
A temple in Chelhar

Before the partition of India in 1947, Hindus and Muslims constituted roughly 52% and 47% of Tharparkar's population, respectively. (Note: In the 1941 census, the British recorded all members of Scheduled Tribes as having 'tribal' religion irrespective of actual practice.) Post-partition, many Hindus emigrated to India, while roughly 3,500 Muslim families immigrated to Tharparkar from India. The immigrant families were given 12 acres of land each (a total of 42,000 acres). After the 1965 and 1971 wars, many Hindus had to abandon their home because of abuse/persecution from erstwhile Hindu-majority Chhachro, left Pakistan for India.

In the 1998 census, 59.42% of the district's population was Muslim and 40.47% Hindu. As of the 2017 census, Muslims are 56.56% while Hindus make up 43.39%. Hindus make up 64% of Tharpakar's urban areas, while Muslims make up 58% of rural areas. Tharparkar today has the largest Hindu population in Pakistan.

The northern Taluks of Dahli, Chachro, Diplo, and Kaloi are majority Muslim, with Dahli being nearly 90% Muslim. The southern Taluks of Islamkot, Mithi and Nagarpakar are Hindu-majority, with Mithi being nearly 70% Hindu.

Population of taluks by religion (2023)
Taluk	Muslims	Hindus	Others
Chachro	64.55%	35.41%	0.04%
Dahli	89.46%	10.41%	0.13%
Diplo	53.16%	46.73%	0.11%
Islamkot	37.64%	62.26%	0.1%
Kaloi	61.94%	37.93%	0.13%
Mithi	29.98%	69.87%	0.15%
Nagarpakar	33.17%	66.6%	0.23%

Religion in contemporary Tharparkar District
Religious group	1941		2017		2023	
Religious group	Pop.	%	Pop.	%	Pop.	%
Islam	89,066	47.40%	931,054	56.56%	964,137	54.31%
Hinduism	73,071	38.89%	714,698	43.39%	811,505	45.64%
Tribal religion (Note: The 1941 census recorded all Scheduled Tribes under 'tribal' irrespective of their real religion.)	25,459	13.55%	—N/a	—N/a	—N/a	—N/a
Others (Note: Including Jainism, Christianity, Buddhism, Zoroastrianism, Judaism, Ad-Dharmis, or not stated)	288	0.16%	1,284	0.05%	2,479	0.05%
Total Population	187,884	100%	1,647,036	100%	1,778,407	100%
Note: 1941 census data is for Chhachro, Diplo, Mithi and Nagarparkar taluks of Tharparkar district, which roughly corresponds to contemporary Tharparkar district.

Religious groups in Tharparkar District (British Sindh era)
Religious group	1872		1881		1891		1901		1911		1921		1931		1941	
Religious group	Pop.	%	Pop.	%	Pop.	%	Pop.	%	Pop.	%	Pop.	%	Pop.	%	Pop.	%
Islam	96,604	53.44%	109,194	53.7%	164,890	55.29%	211,309	58.07%	254,218	55.66%	212,735	53.68%	245,964	52.55%	292,025	50.26%
Hinduism (Note: 1872 census: Also includes Tribals, Jains, Buddhists, and Nanakpanthis (Sikhs). 1881 census: Also includes Tribals and Nanakpanthis (Sikhs). 1891 census: Also includes Tribals. 1901 census: Also includes Tribals and Nanakpanthis (Sikhs).)	84,112	46.53%	93,094	45.78%	132,468	44.42%	151,726	41.7%	196,793	43.08%	176,026	44.41%	218,850	46.76%	247,496	42.6%
Christianity	35	0.02%	14	0.01%	21	0.01%	30	0.01%	80	0.02%	83	0.02%	112	0.02%	816	0.14%
Judaism	10	0.01%	4	0%	0	0%	6	0%	0	0%	0	0%	0	0%	1	0%
Zoroastrianism	0	0%	0	0%	1	0%	4	0%	6	0%	8	0%	3	0%	4	0%
Jainism	—N/a	—N/a	1,038	0.51%	823	0.28%	657	0.18%	524	0.11%	268	0.07%	320	0.07%	212	0.04%
Buddhism	—N/a	—N/a	0	0%	0	0%	0	0%	0	0%	0	0%	0	0%	0	0%
Sikhism	—N/a	—N/a	—N/a	—N/a	0	0%	—N/a	—N/a	1,788	0.39%	1,133	0.29%	2,791	0.6%	6,815	1.17%
Tribal	—N/a	—N/a	—N/a	—N/a	—N/a	—N/a	—N/a	—N/a	3,362	0.74%	6,078	1.53%	0	0%	33,635	5.79%
Others	10	0.01%	0	0%	0	0%	162	0.04%	0	0%	0	0%	0	0%	0	0%
Total population	180,761	100%	203,344	100%	298,203	100%	363,894	100%	456,771	100%	396,331	100%	468,040	100%	581,004	100%
Note: British Sindh era district borders are not an exact match in the present-day due to various bifurcations to district borders — which since created new districts — throughout the region during the post-independence era that have taken into account population increases.

==== Hindu temples ====
1. Shri Ramapir Mandir
2. Churrio Jabal Durga Temple at Nagarparkar - The historic Durga Mata Temple on the Churrio Jabal is visited annually by 200,000 pilgrims annually on Shivratri.
3. Guri Mandir at Guri
4. Krishna Mandar Kantio Tharparkar
5. Nagarparkar temples
6. Parbrahm Ashram (Verijhap Dham) at Diplo
7. Sant Nenuram Ashram at Islamkot

=== Castes & tribes ===
As in the rest of Sindh, most Hindus, especially in rural areas, were the lower caste poor who could not afford to move to India. Over two-thirds of Hindus are Scheduled Castes, which form 28.05% of the entire district's population. This is itself as underestimate as many Scheduled Castes put their religion as generically 'Hindu' rather than Scheduled Caste. The various Hindu communities are:

- Lohana
- Mukhi
- Rajput (Thakur)
- Suthar
- Soni
- Meghwar
- Maharaj
- Maheshwari
- Goswami
- Rabari
- Bheel
- Kolhi
- Lohar
- Kumbhar
- Mangrio
- Arbab
- Khaskheli
- Bajeer

=== Languages ===
An example of the differences in dialects of Dhatki, the most widely spoken language in Tharparkar

In the 2023 census, 99.36% of the population recorded their language as 'Sindhi' on the census. However Tharparkar is home to a wide variety of dialects, lying at the transition zone between Sindhi, Rajasthani and Gujarati. Dhatki, which is the most widely used, is closely related to Marwari on the other side of the border, and transitions to Sindhi in the west. Other languages include the various Koli languages such as Parkari and Kachi Koli spoken in the southeast near the border with Gujarat.

Languages of Tharparkar district (2023)
1. Sindhi (99.4%)
2. Other (0.64%)

=== Human Development ===
The Human Development Index (HDI) of Tharparkar is 0.227. In Pakistan's 2017 HDI report, Tharparkar ranked 109th out of 114 surveyed districts, a drop from its rank as 103rd in 2013, the lowest ranking of any district in Sindh. Tharparkar also ranked among the ten worst districts for HDI growth between 2005 and 2015.

=== Poverty ===
The UNDP's Multidimensional Poverty Index for Pakistan reports that 87% of population in Tharparkar lives under poverty. Due to Tharparkar's poor conditions, including its low HDI and high infant mortality rate, a monitoring commission was formed to oversee the Sindh government's administration of the district.

The Benazir Income Support Programme and the United Nations' World Food Programme agreed to take steps to reduce food insecurity in Tharparkar. In 2019, Pakistan was provided with US$362,000 and 4,727 mt of food assistance.

As a part of humanitarian efforts, 287,000 families in Tharparkar each received 50 kg of wheat 12 times. Additionally, 500 houses were provided to house Thari people. 750 small-scale water plants were constructed in the district at a cost of Rs 7.5 billion. The Thar Foundation, a joint venture of the Sindh government and Engro has planned to build a 250-bed hospital at a cost of Rs 2 billion in Tharparkar. The first 82-bed block was completed in February 2019.

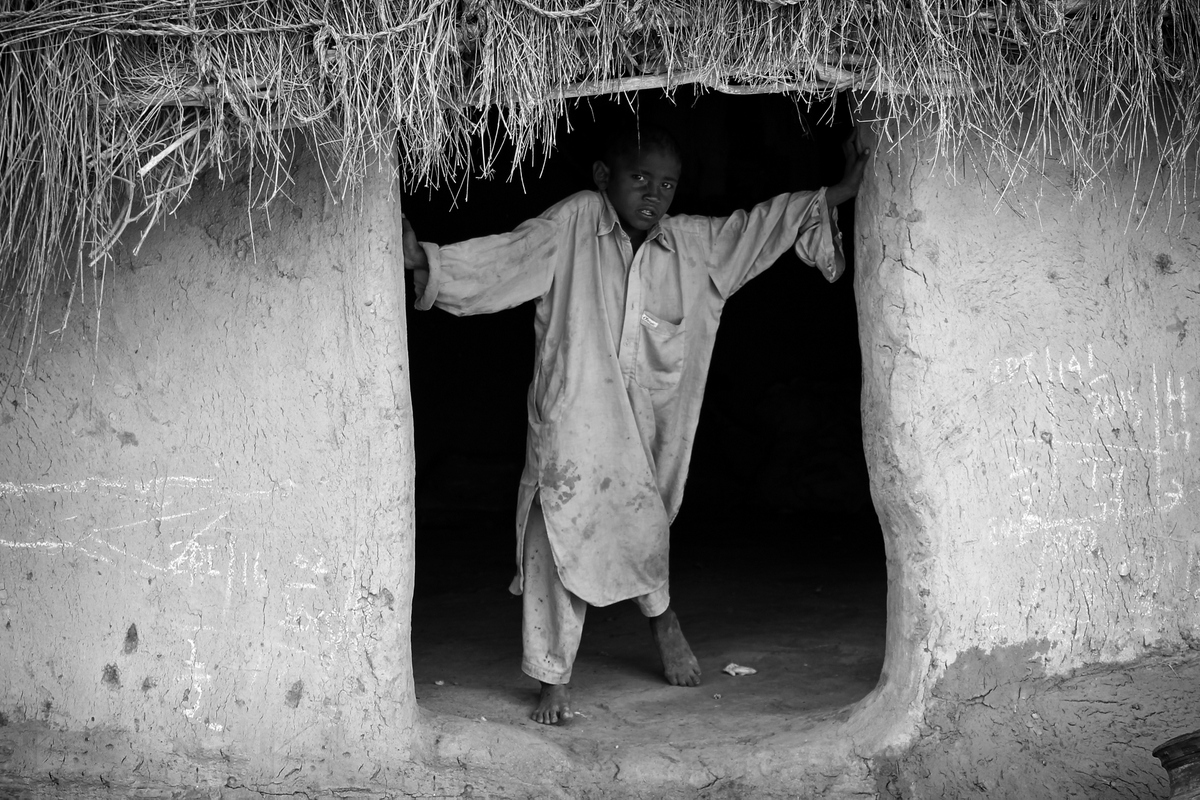
Hunger and malnutrition are the biggest issues in Tharparkar. Each year, around 1,500 children die in the district.

Despite humanitarian initiatives by provincial, federal and international authorities, the region has seen little improvement, especially in its infant mortality rate, which sees around 1,500 children die annually. Between January and October 2019 84 infants died, while in total, 703 children died. In 2016, the National Commission for Human Rights (NCHR) directed the Sindh Chief Secretary to submit a report on cases of infant mortality.

According to Saeed Ghani, Sindh's minister for Local Government, Public Health Engineering and Rural Development, and Katchi Abadies, a mobile app was introduced to assist with the distribution of wheat. However, no such app was actually created, and the system continues to rely on XLS/PDF files, and web resources, that weren't widely distributed.

According to legislator Mahesh Kumar Malani, Rs 15 billion has been spent for development projects in nine years and further development plans worth Rs 18 billion are under way to improve the situation in Tharparkar. According to the Chief Minister of Sindh Rs 70 billion has been spent on the development of infrastructure. The government's Benazir Income Support Programme has transferred Rs 387 billion since 2008. Despite these efforts, the living standard index of Tharparkar has fallen by 50% between 2005 and 2015.

Although Tharparkar has been affected by drought for at least 17 years, and has been a subject of efforts of numerous major NGOs, including USAID, DFID and several branches of the United Nations, no detailed, statistical report on water resources and measures to improve the situation has been published by the government.

=== Health facilities and immunization ===
Thari people face various issues due to waterborne diseases, inadequate health facilities, famine, and lack of basic infrastructure.

==== Health facilities ====
As of 2014, there were 140 health facilities in the district, including a district headquarters hospital with a capacity of 50 beds and 3 tehsil headquarters hospitals with capacities of 80 beds each. When compared to World Health Organization standards, these facilities were sufficient for only 54% of the population, while bedding capabilities were sufficient for only 6%. In Tharparkar, an average 85% of births take place at home, with home births constituting 56% of urban births and 87% of rural births. Tharparkar ranks lowest in Sindh for births assisted by skilled attendants, with only 16% deliveries performed in that manner.

Health facilities in Tharparkar [DU = Data Unavailable]
Type	June 2012	March 2019
Teaching Hospitals	0	DU
District headquarter hospital	1	1
Tehsil headquarter hospitals	3	1
Rural health centres	2	2
Basic Health units	31	36
Govt. Rural Dispensaries	101	38
MCH centres	2	DU
Sub health centres	0	DU
Total	140	78*

==== Immunization ====
On average, only about 25% of pregnant women receive tetanus toxoid injections (25% in rural areas and 37% in urban areas). The overall percentage of infants aged 12–23 who receive full immunization is 21%. Urban areas saw a 32% immunization rate (16% of males and 48% of females), while rural areas saw a 20% rate (26% of males and 14% of females).

=== Comparison ===
Change in HDI compared to provincially and federally top HDI

Trend of change in Human Development Index
Year	Karachi	Lahore	Tharparkar	Rajanpur	Awaran	Kohistan
2005	0.812	0.811	0.303	0.441	0.067	0.155
2007	▲0.819	▼0.804	▼0.164	▼0.348	▼0.000	▲0.168
2009	▲0.852	▲0.834	▲0.185	▼0.347	▲0.240	▲0.188
2011	▲0.864	▼0.824	▲0.203	▲0.399	▼0.127	▼0.137
2013	▲0.867	▲0.858	▲0.257	▲0.481	▼0.111	▲0.172
2015	▼0.854	▲0.877	▼0.227	▲0.506	▲0.173	▲0.229
As of 2015	Provincial Top HDI	Federally Top HDI	Lowest in Sindh	Lowest in Punjab	Lowest in Balochistan	Lowest in KPK
Rank change in 2 years (2013–2015)	▼ -2	▲ +2	▼ -6	+7	▼ -2	0
Rank change in a decade (2005–2015)	▼ -2	▲ +2	▼ -34	▼ -14	▼ -15	▼ -15

Comparing components of Human Development Index for 2015
Components	Karachi	Lahore	Tharparkar	Rajanpur	Awaran	Kohistan
Immunization rate (%)	80.2	89.5	38.1	90.7	85.2	21.9
Satisfaction with health facility (%)	82.5	85.8	57.0	65.2	83.3	56.9
Expected years of schooling (years)	11.8	12.2	6.4	7.1	5.9	5.5
Mean years of schooling (years)	7.7	7.5	2.3	2.0	2.5	1.3
Living Standard (%)	98.5	98.9	7.5	48.9	1.9	12.5

Comparing Multidimensional Poverty Index(MPI) and its components for 2015
		Karachi	Lahore	Tharparkar	Rajanpur	Awaran	Kohistan
	MPI (value)	0.019	0.017	0.481	0.357	0.415	0.581
Population in multidimensional poverty (%)	Incidence - Headcount	4.5	4.3	87	64.4	77.2	95.8
Population in multidimensional poverty (%)	Intensity	42.4	38.8	55.2	55.4	53.8	60.6
Contribution of deprivation to overall poverty (%)	Education	57.5	65.6	38.8	44.3	38.4	41.9
Contribution of deprivation to overall poverty (%)	Health	12.4	11.7	18.0	22.2	18.1	24.1
Contribution of deprivation to overall poverty (%)	Living Standards	30.2	22.6	43.2	33.6	43.5	34.1

== Education ==
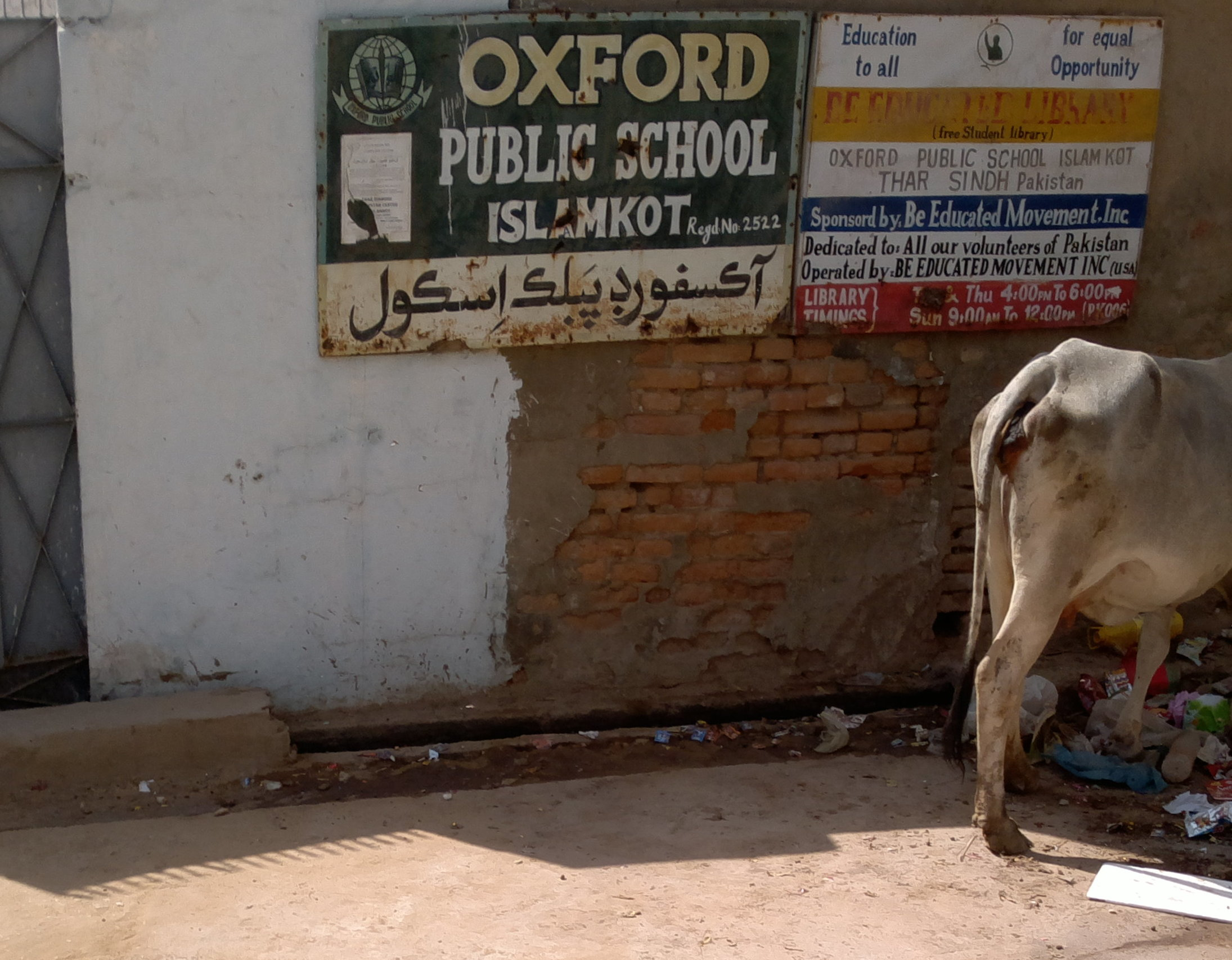
Entrance board of a Tharparkar school

From 2011 to 2016, Sindh has increased education spending by 90%, from PKR 14.26 billion to PKR 148 billion. Despite these recent increases in provincial expenditures, Tharparkar district's educational situation is poor. The overall literacy rate of the population older than 10 is 46%, with the overall male literacy rate of 65% much higher than the female rate of 25%. Urban areas have higher rates, with an average 69% (male: 81%, female: 54%), while rural areas have lower rates, with an average 45% (male: 64%, female: 23%). 37% of those older than 15 are literate.

The gross enrolment ratio (GER) for primary level schooling is 84% (male: 96% and female: 71%). The urban GER of 105% (male: 118%, female: 92%) is significantly higher than the rural GER of 84% (male: 95%, female: 70%). The net enrolment rate (NER) for primary level schooling is 52% (male: 57%, female: 47%). The NER in urban areas is 77% (male: 78%, female: 76%) while in rural areas it is 52% (male: 56%, female: 46%).

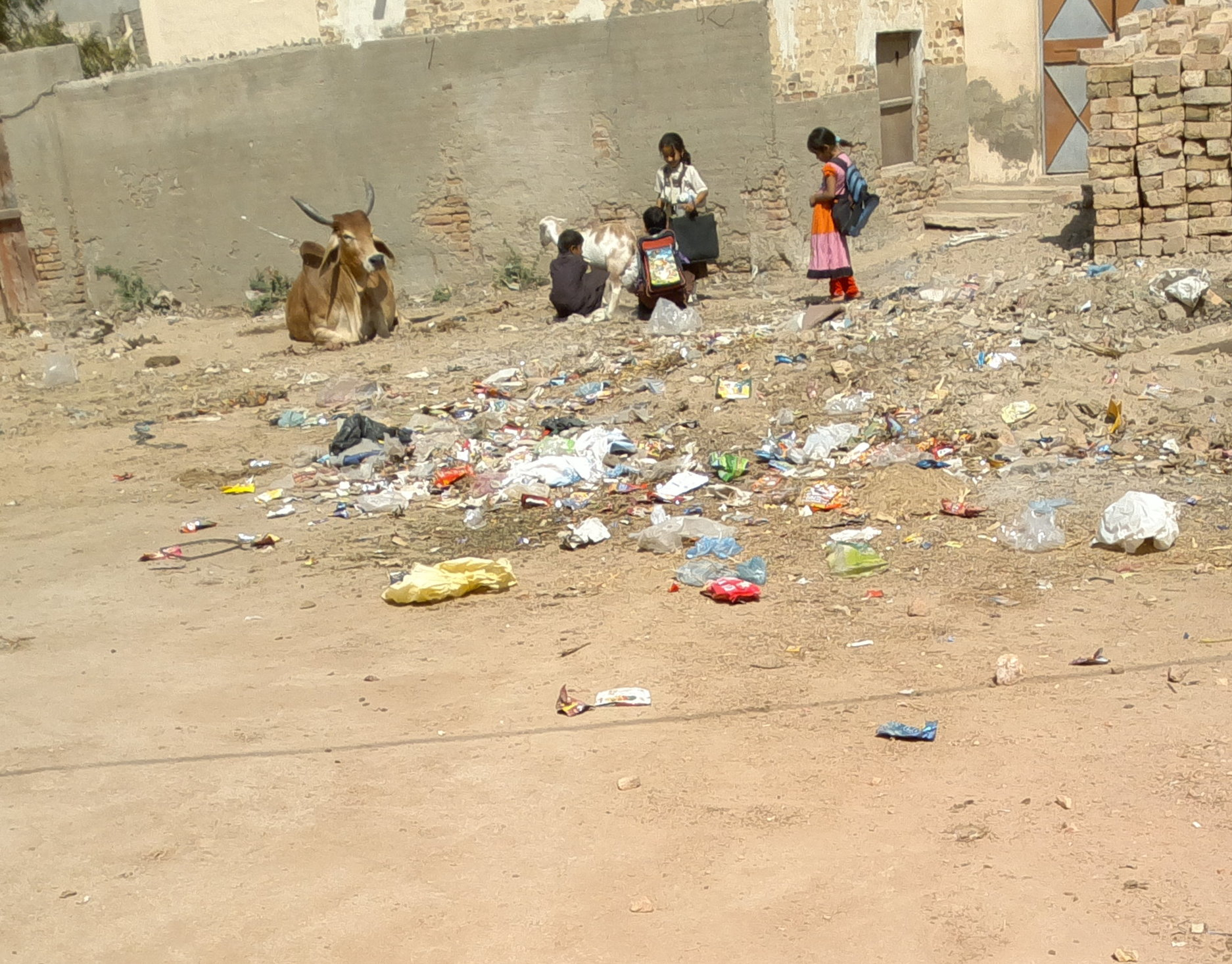
Children milking a goat outside a Tharparkar school

In total, 221,203 students, of which 125,189 are male and 96,014 are female, are enrolled in Tharparkar's 4,152 schools. Of those schools, 620 are male-only, 629 are female-only, and 2,903 are co-ed. There are a total 5,469 teachers, of which 4,813 are male and 656 female. Each school has an average 53 students and 1.3 teachers, and the average student–teacher ratio is about 40, consistent throughout most levels of schooling.

The Sindh Bureau of Statistics places the number of schools in Tharparkar at 4,010, the highest of any district in Sindh. About 4.4% of schools have access to electricity. About 34.6% have washrooms, and about 16.0% have drinking water. Only about 0.4% and 0.6% have access to libraries and laboratories, respectively. Only about 2.2% have playgrounds. About 74.5% have school management committees.

Education statistics by level of schooling
Level	Number of schools	Students	Male	Female	Teachers	Male	Female	Student-teacher ratio	Classrooms (average)
Primary	3,873	190,370	105,494	84,876	4,625	4,057	568	41	1
Middle	234	15,052	8,587	6,465	362	344	18	42	2
Secondary	40	12,130	7,833	4,297	403	333	70	30	7
Higher secondary	5	3,651	3,275	376	79	79	0	46	17
Total	4,152	221,203	125,189	96,014	5,469	4,813	656	40	1.1

=== University ===
In April 2019, a large social media movement using the hashtag #TharNeedsUniversity and protesting the lack of a university campus in Tharparkar district demanded the establishment of such an institution. The movement prompted the government to take measures to establish a sub-campus in Islamkot. NED University of Engineering and Technology, in partnership with Sindh Engro Coal Mining Company (SECMC) and The Citizens Foundation (TCF), announced the creation of the "Thar Institute of Engineering, Science, and Technology" in Islamkot, which would be a sub-campus of NED. An undergraduate programme was planned to commence in October 2019, although instruction was planned to take place at the TCF-Engro Campus Islamkot until a more permanent campus could be established.

However, the location of the future campuses was moved after the Sindh government purchased 317 acres of land in Mithi for Rs 1.5 billion. In addition, the temporary location was moved from the TCF-Engro Campus in Islamkot to the Benazir Cultural Complex in Mithi after payment of Rs 120 million by the Sindh government. In October 2019, the temporary NED University campus was inaugurated at the Shaheed Benazir Cultural Complex in Mithi, although several weeks after the planned date for the cancelled Islamkot campus.

A Thari patko, a traditional type of turban

== Culture ==
Tharparkar is considered the most peaceful place in the entire country and is well known for its centuries-old interfaith harmony. The culture of Tharparkar is an exemplary example of pluralism in Sindh. Muslim residents do not sacrifice cows, not because of any laws but to avoid causing offense to the Hindu community. Hindu residents avoid weddings and celebrations during Muharram (an Islamic month notable for its solemn mood). Hindus also fast and arrange Iftar dinners for their Muslim neighbors in the month of Ramadan, and both sides exchange sweets on Eid and Diwali. Muslim residents also avoid eating any meat during the Hindu occasion of Navratri. According to Dawn, there appears to be no recorded instance communal violence in the district.

Another unique feature of the district's culture is its relatively low crime rate. Normally, crime is associated with poverty, yet in this district the crime level is low despite its poverty and unemployment level.

=== Cuisine ===
Guar is a major food crop in Tharparkar and Guar Chibhad ji bhaaji is among popular dishes.	Singhri(Sangri) grows in arid or desert climates throughout year in Thar and Singhrian ji Bhaaji is prepared from it.	Achar is prepared from fruits and flowers of Kair. Also vegetable dish known as Kairan (or Doran) ji Bhaaji is prepared.	Singhrian jo Raabro (Khaatiyo) is one of variant of Singhri vegetable dish prepared with Kadhi.

Thari people are predominantly vegetarian. Singhri (Sangri), Kair and Guar are among most popular in Thar.

=== Festivals ===
Various festivals in Thar include:

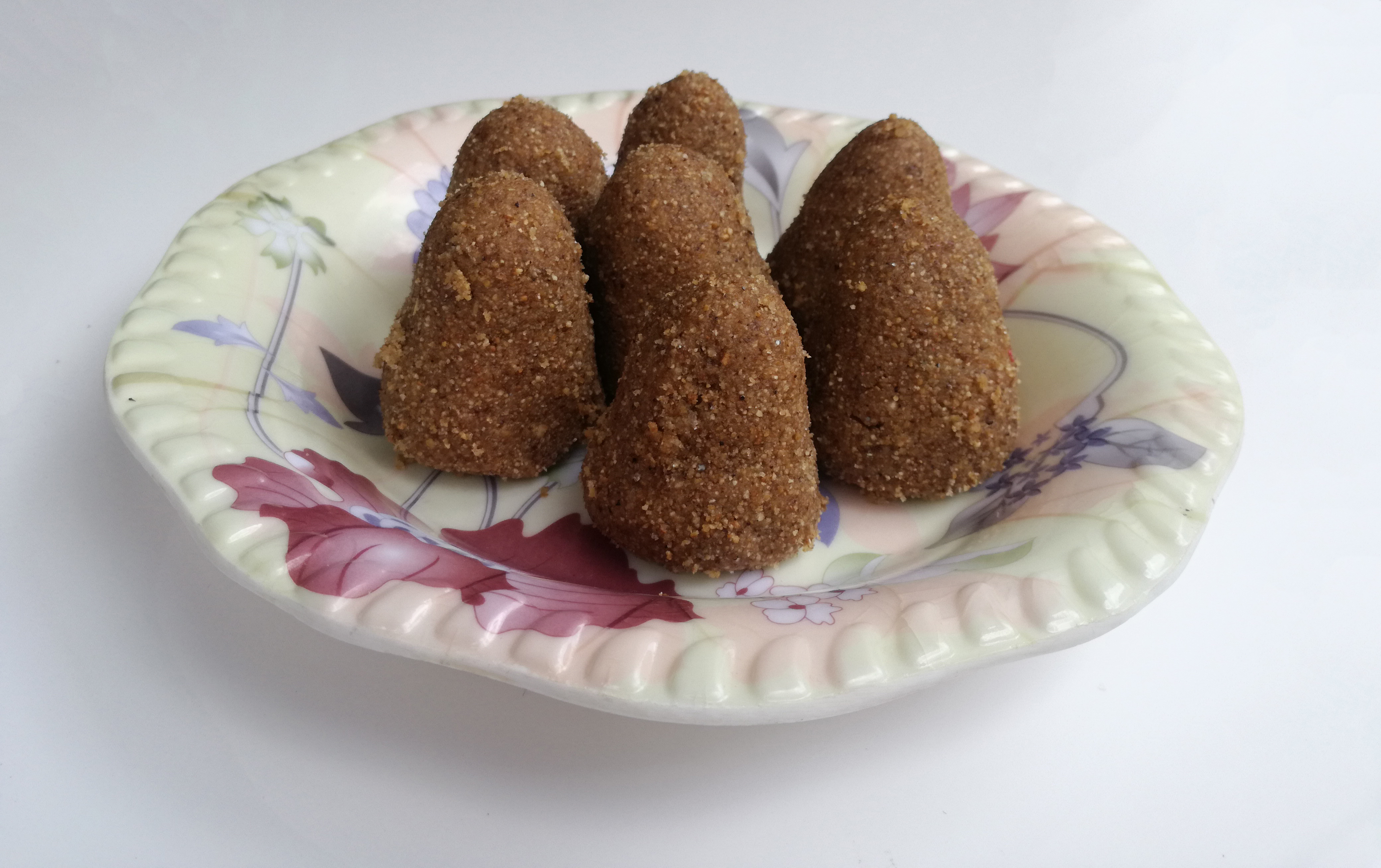
Sattu is prepared for Teejdi (or Teej) festival

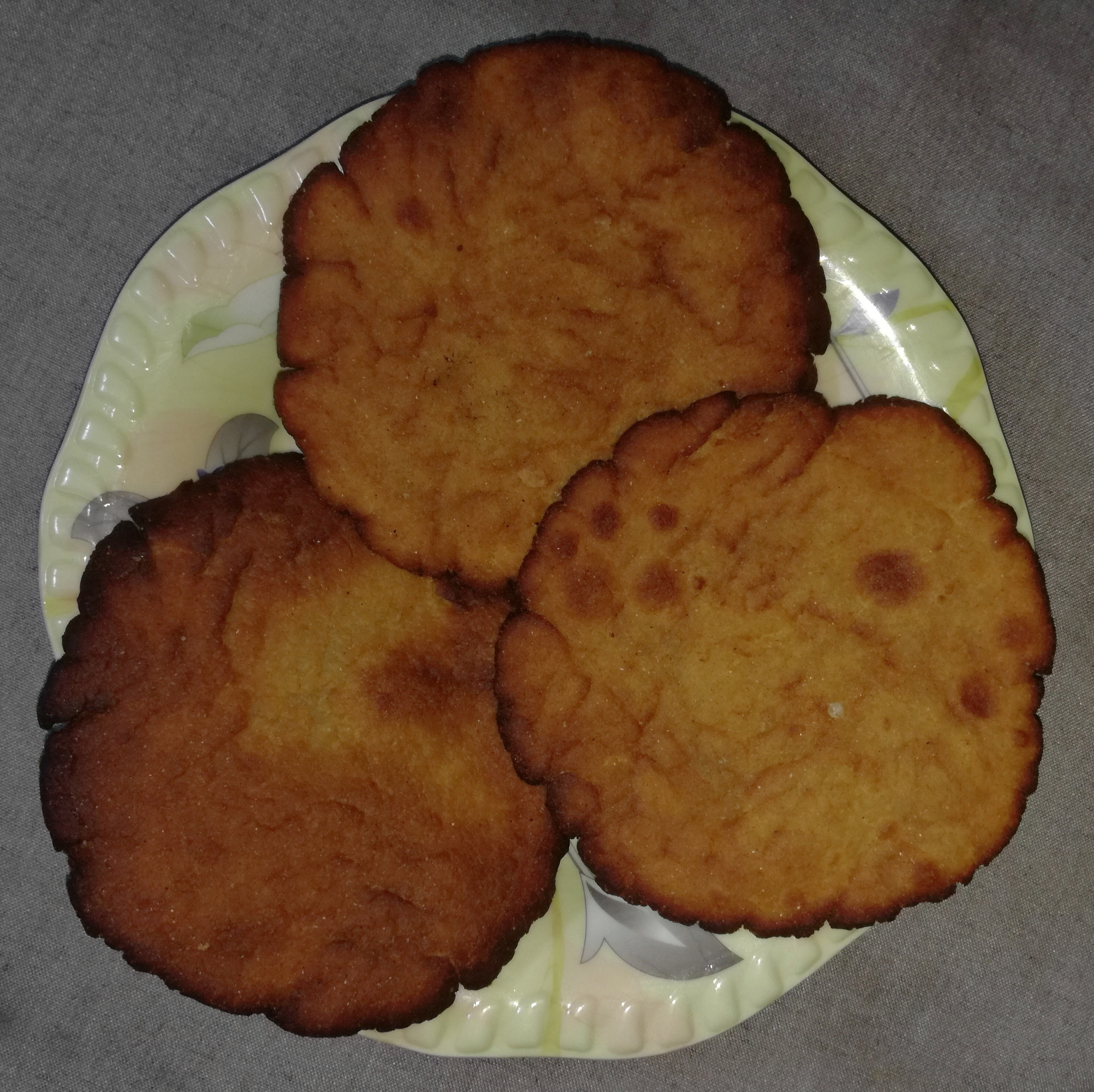
Lola (Lolo in singular) prepared on Thadri by Sindhis

==== Teejdi ====
Teejdi (known among Sindhis) also known as Teej or Kajari Teej is celebrated in Thar on Tritiya-Krishna Paksha of Bhadrapada. During this festival the women observe fast and also pray to the moon when it rises. While prayers to moon 5 leaves of Ak(2 below Pāda, 2 in īrmá and 1 on Śiraḥ ) are kept and Argh is offered. After the prayers, fast is broken by consuming some Argh and Sattu on another leaf of Ak. The fast is observed by married women for health of their husband while unmarried women pray for marital bliss.

==== Thadri ====
Thadri festival is celebrated by Sindhis, one tithi before Krishna Janmasthmi during which cold (i.e. cooked a day ahead) and pro biotic foods like yogurt and pickle are consumed. Thadri reflects a tribute to Sheetla Mata.

==== Chetichand ====
Cheti Chand is celebrated by Sindhi Hindus. It is the festival which marks the beginning of the Hindu New Year for Sindhi Hindus. It is celebrated on first day of the Sindhi month Chet (Chaitra).

==== Naurata ====
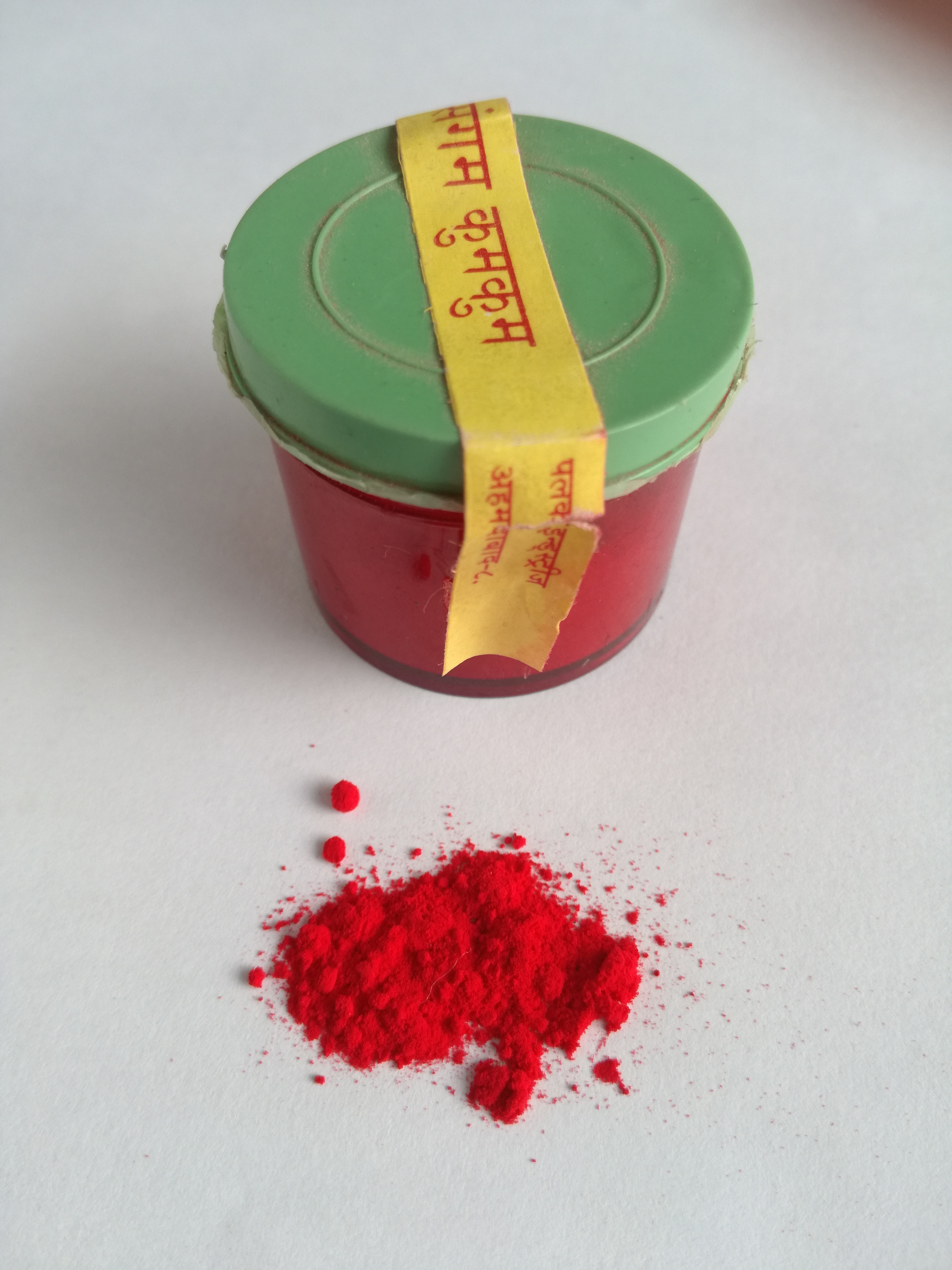
Kumkuma is applied on sing of Gou Mata during Gou Puja on Dhanteras.

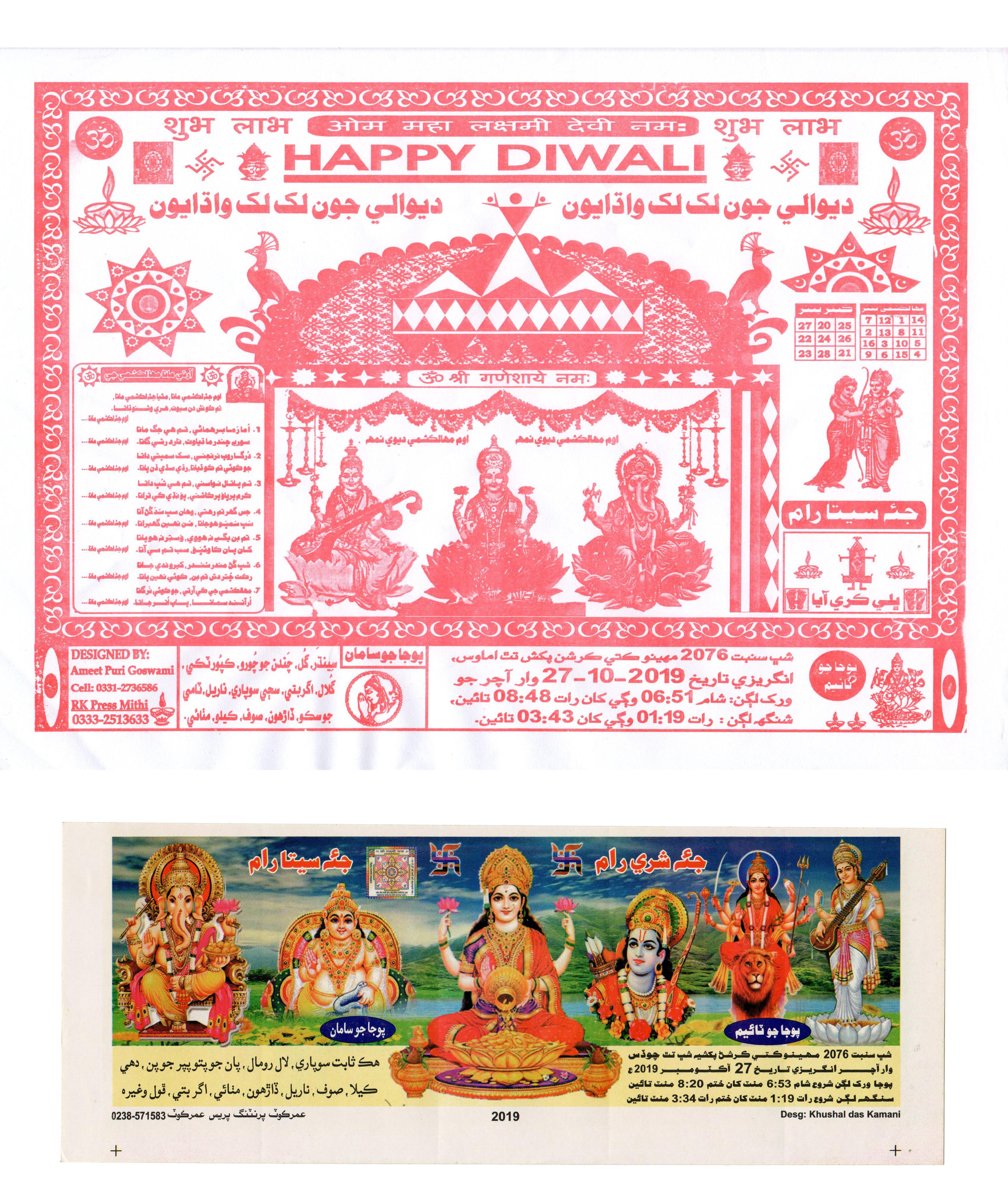
During Diwali festival the Brahmins irrespective of their social and economic prosperity follow their Brahmin Dharma by going door-to-door to get Bhikhsha Daan and provide people such Diwali Patrikas (leaflets or stickers). During the Muhurt Chittan or Lakshmi Chittan ritual, this Diwali Patrika having image of Lakshmi is placed or applied within the drawn door frame.

Naurata is celebrated twice in a year by Sindhi Hindus in the honor of goddess Durga. The duration of this festival is nine nights (and ten days) which is marked by fasting and abstinence. The devotees with partial fast observe strict vegetarian diet during this holy festival. On Ashtami after the havan ritual or on Navami, devotees offer meal and kheer to nine young girls (considering them as nau mata avatars) following with gift of red chunri. During all nine nights the garba (dance around lighted lamps or an image of the Goddess, Durga) is performed. Ramlila is also performed with Ravana Dahan on Dussehra (tenth day).

==== Diyari ====
Diyari (ڏياري, डियारी) is one of prominent Hindu festival celebrated eighteen days after the Dussehra festival. The five-day festival of lights begins with Dhanteras as the first day when females do Gau Puja which includes Sing Abhishek (ritual of applying kumkuma on sing) during which they feed laddu to Gau Mata. The next day is celebrated as Roop Choudas which involves female tradition of Shringar including application of kajal in the eyes. The third day is celebrated with Lakshmi Pujan. On the day of Lakshmi Pujan during the first Choghadiya of Amrut or Shubh or Labh, the ritual of Muhurt Chittan or Lakshmi Chittan (drawing directly on wall or on a paper hanging on wall of Puja Kaksh, a pointed bell-shaped door frame and Shri within it using twig of Neem or Ashoka and red colour prepared by mixture of kumkuma, raw milk and Ganga jal). During the same Choghadiya or in next Choghadiya of same types the puja is performed. Celebrants clean, renovate, and decorate homes and workplaces, purchase new clothing, home refurbishments, gifts, gold, jewellery. During this festival the temples, houses and shops are brightly illuminated with diyas. The youngers take blessings from elders in family, share gifts and sweets and light fireworks.

The duration of this festival is considered very auspicious and believed to give success in work beginning in this time. During this shubh muhurt many political events are exclusively organised in Tharparkar or across Pakistan. In 2015, during this festival in a political event organised in Tharparkar, a politician even being non-Hindu gave significance to this festival and explained the character of Ravana referring illustration from real life in present. In 2019, during this prominent Hindu festival several political parties across Pakistan have scheduled a nationwide anti-government march.

== Tourism ==
Major tourist destinations in Tharparkar district include:

=== Nagarparkar Jain Temples ===
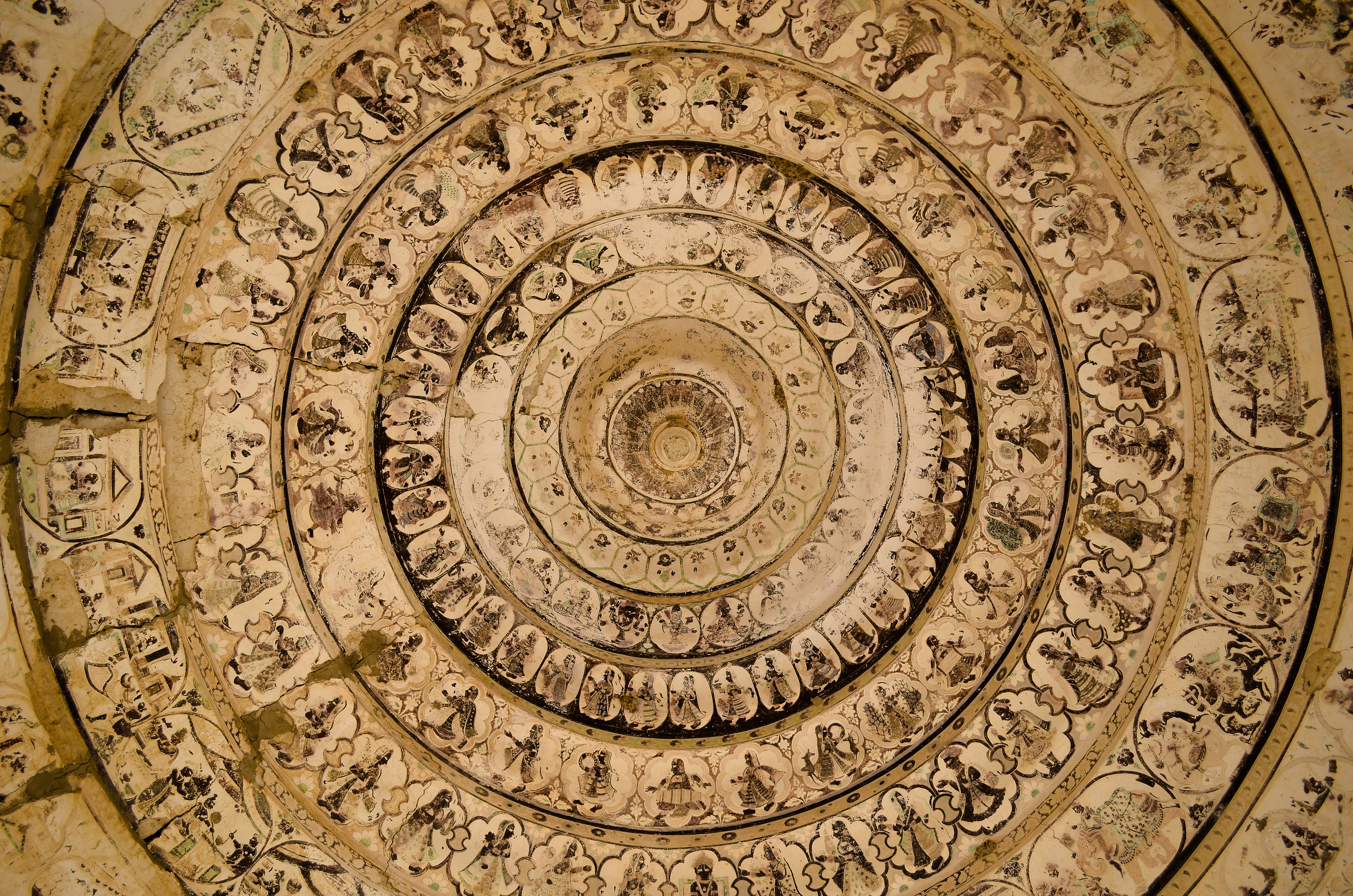
Frescoes at the Gori Temple are the oldest existing Jain frescoes in the world.

These approximately 14 Jain temples along with Bhodesar Mosque are scattered throughout Nagarparkar taluka are inscribed on the tentative list for UNESCO World Heritage as the Nagarparkar Cultural Landscape. Buildings of these temples date from the 12th to the 15th centuries.

=== Parbrahma Dham / Verijhap Dham ===
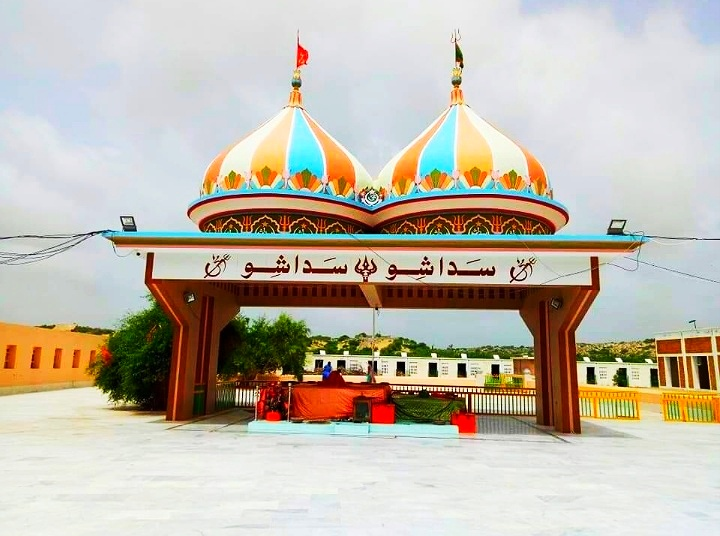
Parbrahm Ashram

Parbrahm Ashram ( پاربرهم ڌام ) also known as Verijhap Dham(ويڊيجپ ڌام) or Chhari Saheb Dham (ڇڙي صاحب ڌام ) near Diplo taluka is an ancient Shiva Temple considered as Jyotirlinga where thousands of yatris arrive for "Divya Jyot Darshan" (Divine Light View) from a Jar. After the independence of Pakistan in 1947 the migrated Hindus worship Chhari Saheb at Sadashiv Chhari Mandir, Kubernagar in Ahmedabad. However many devotees across the world arrive in Diplo during the annual "Parbrahma Jo Melo" or "Parbrahma Mela" held in Jeth (the third Sindhi month).

=== Gadi Bhit ===
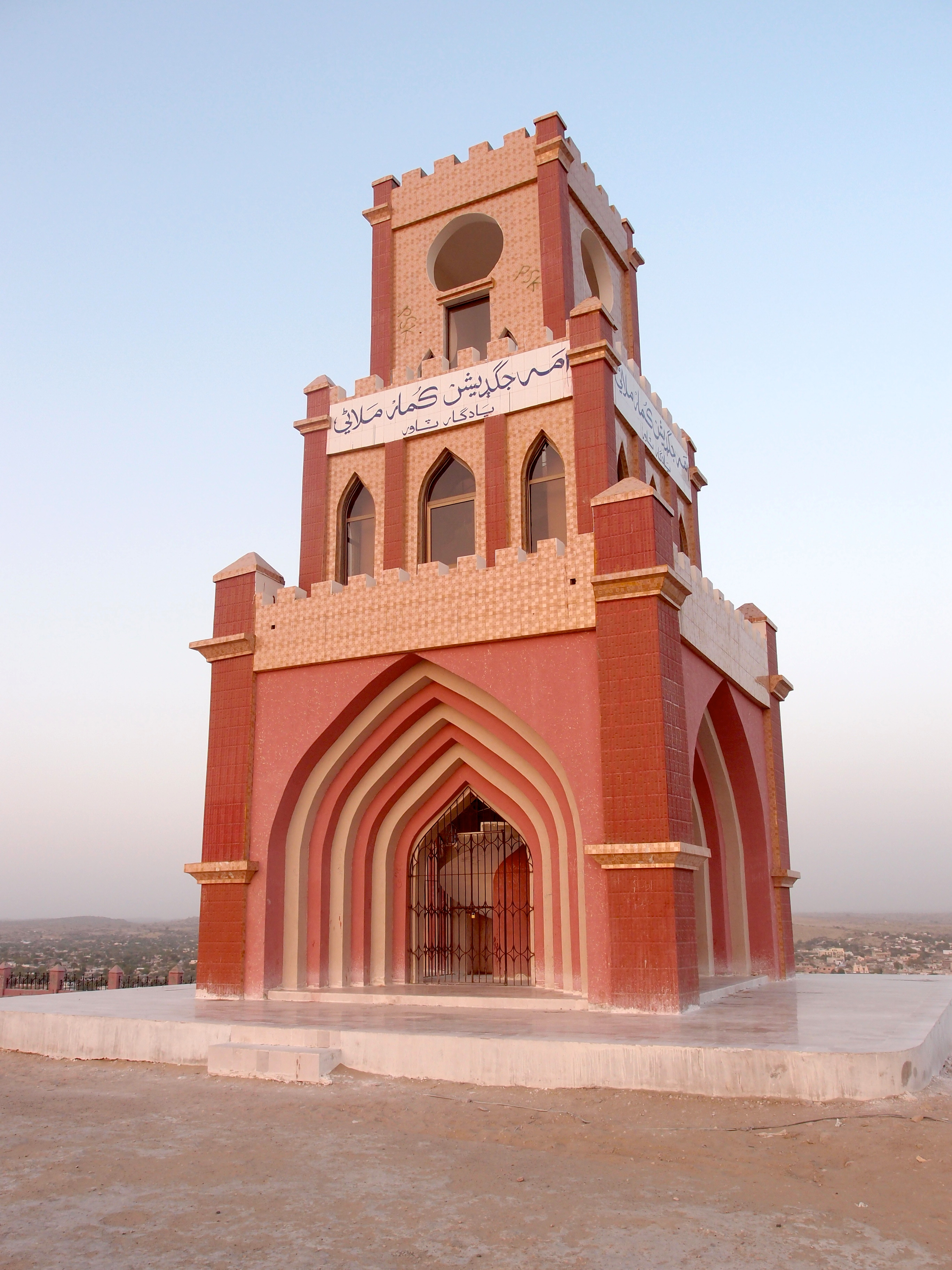
Gadi Bhit monument view

Gadi Bhit is the highest elevation point of Mithi which is built on a sand hill giving panoramic view of entire town.

=== Churrio Jabal ===
Churrio Jabal (چوڙيو جبل ) is a historic Durga Mata Temple on the Churrio hill which is visited annually by 200,000 pilgrims from Nepal, India and other countries annually on Shivratri. Hindus bring cremated ashes of their departed beloveds to immerse in the holy water. The valuable and multi-coloured hill supporting the temple is mined for its rare and expensive granite, which is posing a serious threat to the hill and this ancient Hindu temple.

=== Marvi Jo Khooh (Marvi's Well) ===
Marvi Jo Khoh (Marvi's Well) is heritage of Sindh located near village Bhalva in Tharparkar.

=== Sant Nenuram Ashram / Puranbharti Ashram ===
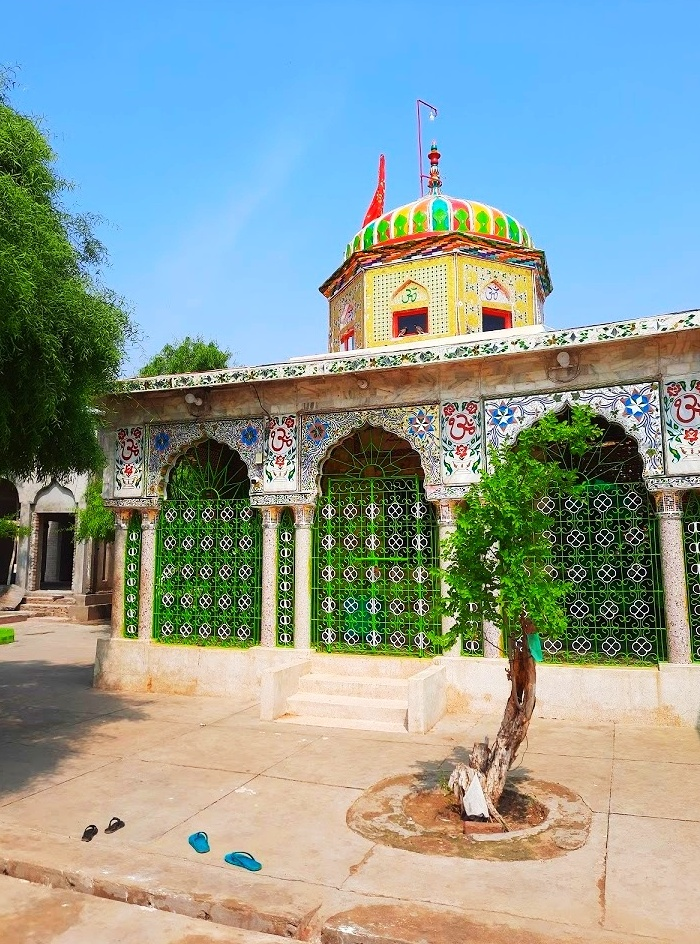
Sant Nenuram Ashram

Sant Nenuram Ashram (سنت نيڻورام آشرم ) also known as Puranbharti Ashram (پرڻڀارتي آشرم ) or Aakharo (آکاڊون) was established by Nihalchand Pabani (Neem Revolutionist) in Islamkot (also known as Neem Town or Sant Nenuram Nagri). The Ashram each day twice throughout year serves Bhandhara which is available for everyone. Daily large number of people from different caste, creed, race or religion avail this meal. Apart from this daily huge number of birds (especially Crows, Raven and Peacock) are fed Nukti-Bhujia in Ashram by devotees visiting the Ashram. An annual three-day festival of Sant (Sant Jo Melo) is celebrated by thousands of devotees including both Hindus and Muslims. The annual festival is celebrated in Ashwina month of Hindu Calendar beginning from Tritiya-Krishna Paksha (Andhari Teej) to Panchami- Krishna Paksha (Andhari Pacham).

=== Karoonjhar Mountains ===
Karoonjhar Mountains are located near Nagarparkar on the northern edge of the Rann of Kutch with approximately 19 km length and height of 305 m.

== Administration ==
Tharparkar District is divided into 7 Tehsils, 64 Union Councils, 172 Dehs, and 2,365 villages.

Map of Tharparkar District's tehsils

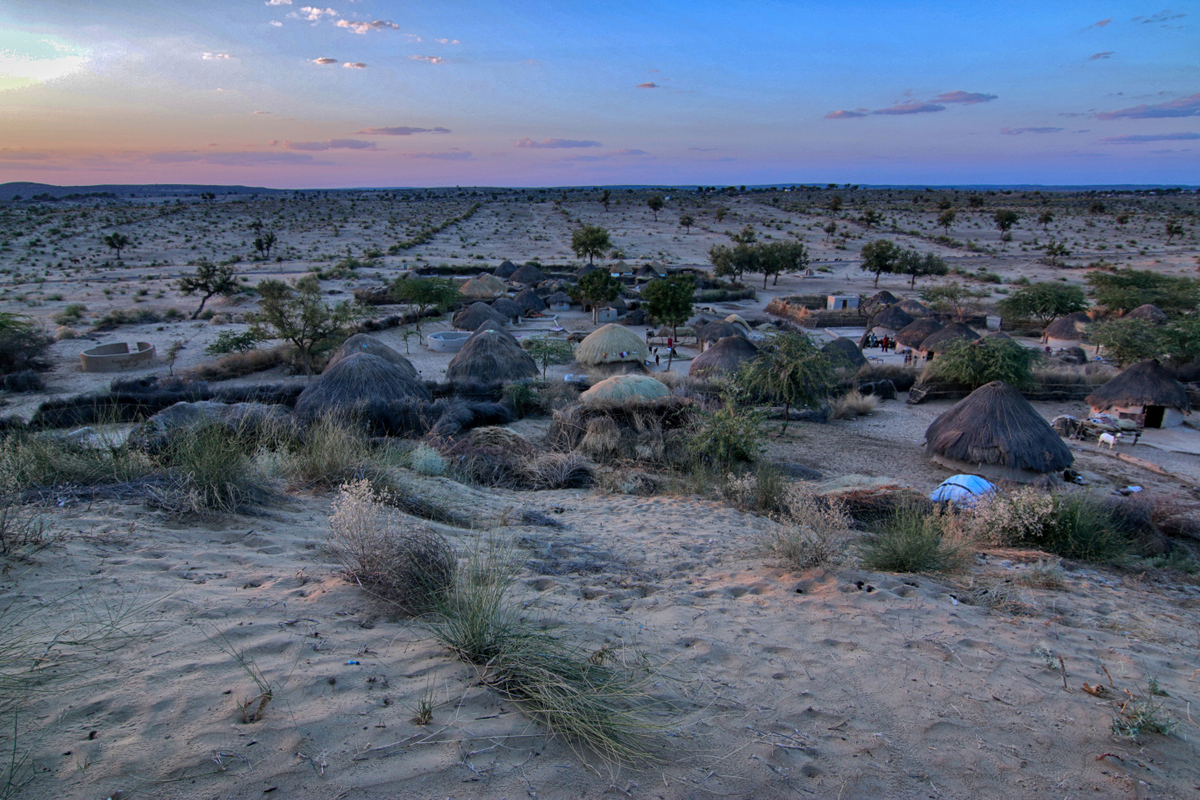
Tribal settlement in Tharparkar

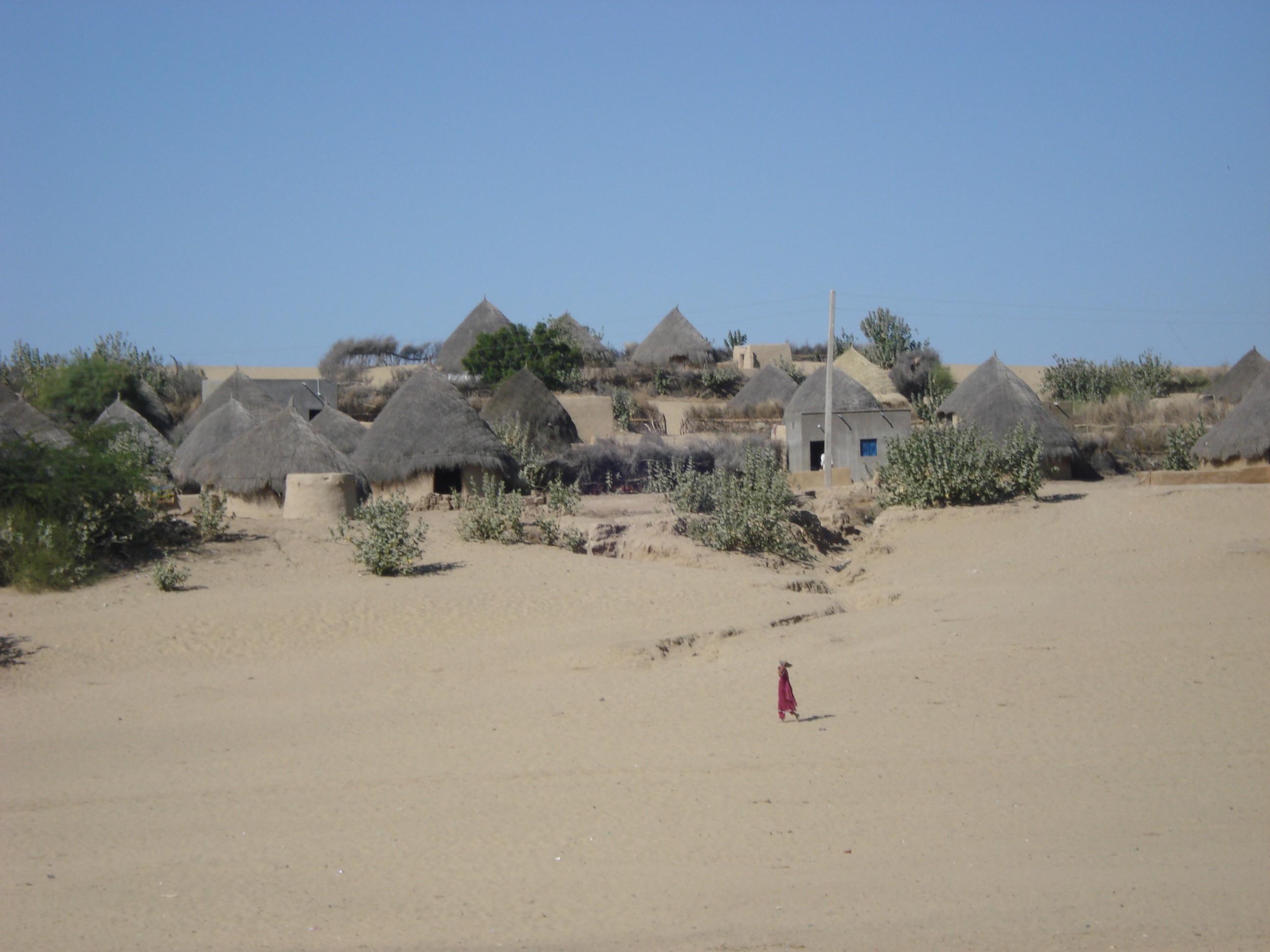
Village in Tharparkar

=== Tehsils ===
- Mithi
- Diplo
- Islamkot
- Chachro
- Dahli
- Nagarparkar
- Kaloi

=== Union Councils ===
- Mithi
- Amrio
- Mohrano
- Joruo
- Malanhore Veena
- Mithrio Bhatti
- Bhakuo
- Manjithi
- Islamkot
- Seengaro
- Diplo
- Malihar
- Bhitaro
- Bolhari
- Dabhro
- Kaloi
- Kantio
- Vejhiar
- Chachro
- Rajoro
- Hirar
- Heerar
- Saranghiar
- Tardos
- Karooro Sama
- Tar Ahmed
- Mithrio Charan
- Khensar
- Parno
- Laplo
- Pirane Jo Par
- Dahili
- Gadro
- Jesse Jo Par
- Pithapur
- Virawah
- Satidera
- Peelu
- Bolhari
- Jhirmirio
- Sobhiar
- Kehri
- Khario Ghulam Shah
- Sonal Beh
- Khetlari
- Sarhod
- Chelhar
- Godhiyar
- Harho
- Nagarparkar
- Tugusar

=== List of Dehs ===
The following is a list of Tharparkar District's 172 dehs, organised by taluka:

- Chachro Taluka (19 dehs)
  - Arbalhiar
  - Chachro
  - Charnore
  - Dhakalo
  - Dharendharo
  - Hinjtal
  - Hirar
  - Janjhi
  - Kantio
  - Khudi
  - Milkam
  - Mithrio Charan
  - Pabuvero
  - Rajoro
  - Rarli
  - Rawatsar
  - Saranghiar
  - Tar Hameer
  - Tardos
- Dahli Taluka (23 dehs)
  - Allah Rakhio Jo Par
  - Charihar
  - Dahali
  - Deburi
  - Dohri
  - Gadhro
  - Gul Muhammad Rahimoon
  - Jesse Jo Par
  - Jogivero
  - Kalario
  - Kamanhar
  - Khariryoon
  - Kheensar
  - Kheme jo Par
  - Laplo
  - Neblo
  - Parno
  - Pirano Par
  - Rohar Kelhan
  - Sajan Par
  - Tar Ahmed
  - Verari
- Diplo Taluka (42 dehs)
  - Balihari
  - Bhitaro
  - Bolhari
  - Chhachhi Moora
  - Chhai Chhapro
  - Chhapanhar
  - Dabhro
  - Deengario
  - Diplo
  - Dodharo
  - Dohar
  - Hamera Beh
  - Jangh
  - Kaloi
  - Kharak
  - Khetlari
  - Kounral
  - Kun Rehmatullah
  - Layari
  - Melanhar
  - Murad Lashari
  - Nabisar
  - Paneli
  - Phant
  - Piloori
  - Rajar
  - Sadoi
  - Sajai
  - Sandook
  - Saran
  - Sedio
  - Seengario
  - Serhi
  - Sobhiar
  - Soomrasar
  - Talo
  - Tando Niazi
  - Thohar Chhaho
  - Turkiar
  - Uth Daho
  - Verhar
  - Wingi
- Islamkot Taluka (22 dehs)
  - Bapuhar
  - Boharri
  - Chhaho
  - Giryanchho
  - Islamkot
  - Jeendo Dars
  - Jhum
  - Kerti
  - Kehri
  - Khario Ghulam Shah
  - Kunbhario
  - Kurn
  - Manjethi
  - Mataro Sand
  - Mithrau Chhuto
  - Mithrio Soomra
  - New Kerto
  - Okraro
  - Seengaro
  - Sonal Beh
  - Sulleman Hajam
  - Wanihath
- Mithi Taluka (28 dehs)
  - Akheraj
  - Bhakuo
  - Chelhar
  - Dhorakioon
  - Godhiar
  - Haido
  - Janhan
  - Janjhiar
  - Joruo
  - Karam Ali Shah
  - Khanore
  - Lakhmiar
  - Lunihar
  - Luqman Wai
  - Malanhore Khawaria
  - Mithi
  - Mithrio Bhatti
  - Mundhawah
  - Naser
  - Naukot
  - Nuhato
  - Pabuhar
  - Posarko
  - Rohelri
  - Talhi
  - Veenjhiar
  - Vijuto
  - Wassaepota
- Nagarparkar Taluka (38 dehs)
  - Adhigam
  - Balhiari
  - Behrano
  - Bheemaveri
  - Chotal
  - Churio
  - Dabho
  - Dandhoro
  - Dhengano
  - Ghoti
  - Goozri
  - Harho
  - Hirar Deda
  - Kasbo
  - Kharirio
  - Kharoro
  - Ladhovarni
  - Mamchero
  - Mehrano
  - Misri Shah
  - Mithrio Juneja
  - Mondhro
  - Nagarparkar
  - Onhair
  - Orhamar
  - Parodharo
  - Piloo
  - Pithapur
  - Ranpur
  - Rathi
  - Sabhusan
  - Sadooras
  - Satidera
  - Shivlo
  - Somreth
  - Soorachand
  - Tigusar
  - Virawah

== Disaster ==
Drought, malnutrition, child mortality, suicide and locust attacks are common in Tharparkar. Tharparkar has been declared by the government as in a drought for at least 17 separate years before 2018.

=== Environmental issues ===
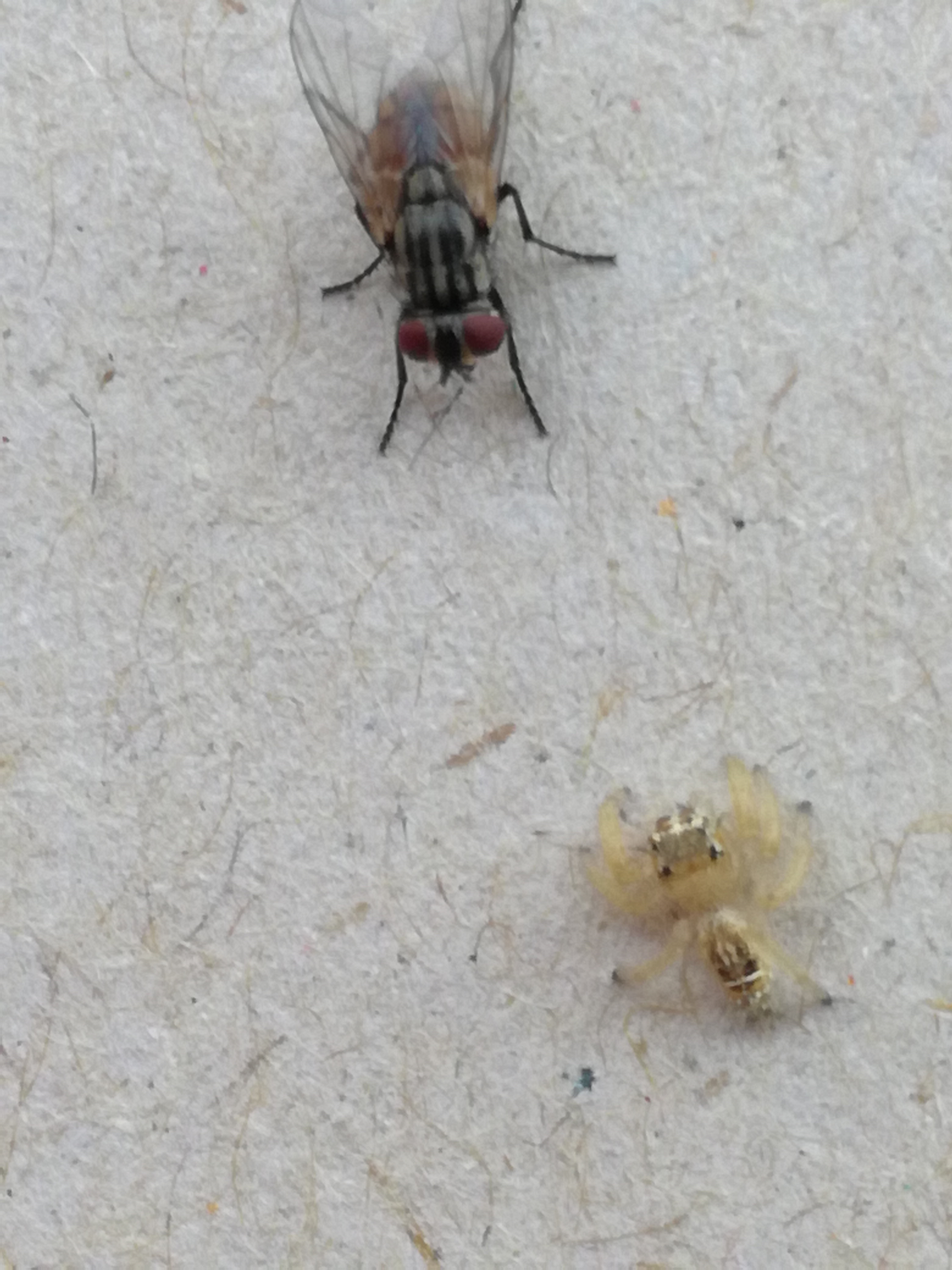
A fly and spider in Tharparkar

Tharparkar experiences the effects of earthquakes, floods, thunderstorms, drought, and locust attacks. Nagarparkar taluka is especially affected by these natural disasters. In addition, climate change issues affect the district and worsen preexisting environmental problems. Recent (2019) earthquakes have included one on 18 November, and one on 1 December which occurred during the Sindhi Cultural Day celebrations.

==== Locust ====
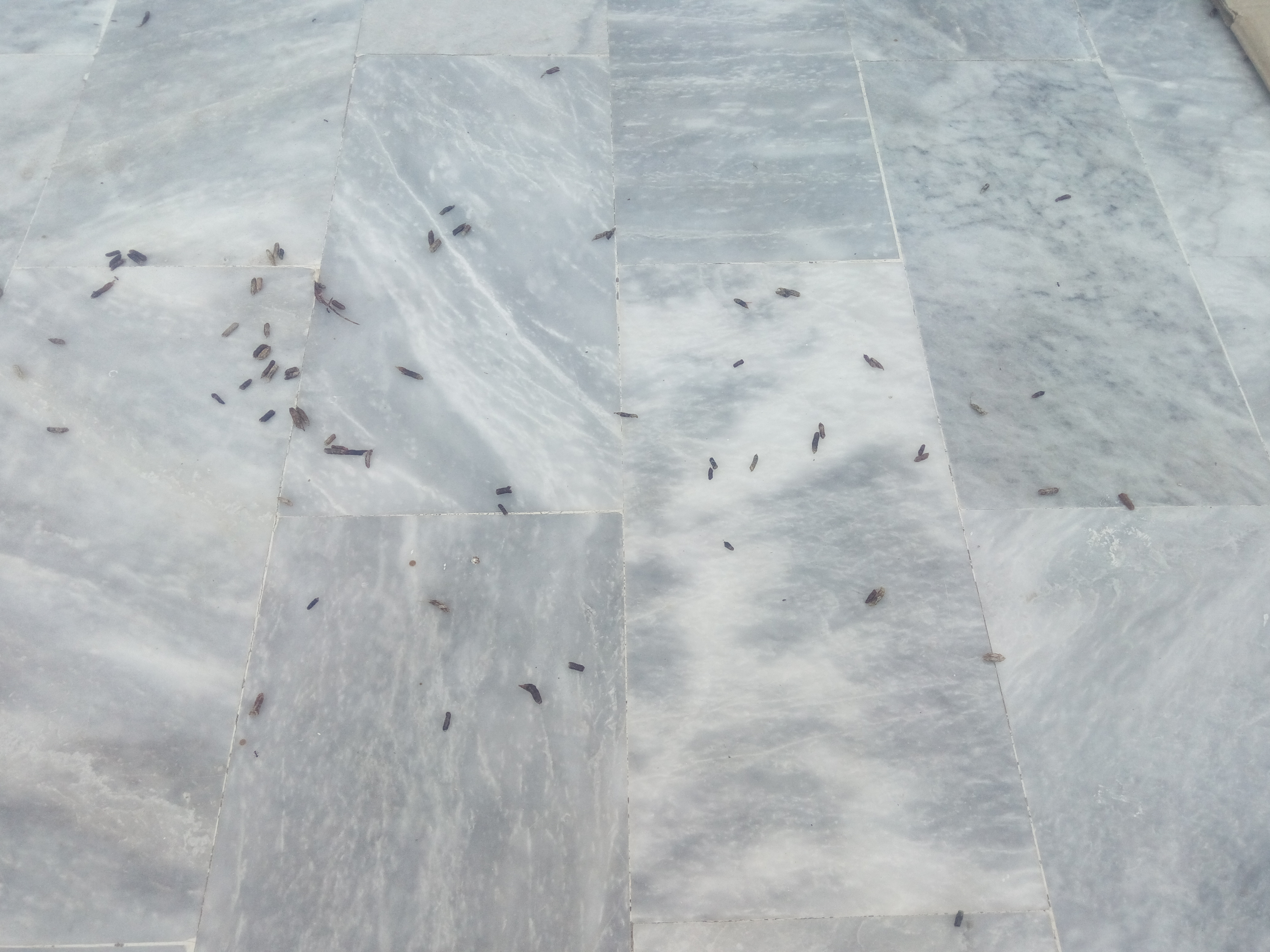
Feces from one of the swarms which has affected Tharparkar

For a large part of 2019, beginning in May, there were large locust swarms which adversely affected Tharparkar's agriculture and economy through destruction of crops which many people rely on for food and livelihood.

Some activists claimed that government response to the disaster was lackluster, and in one incident, Ismail Rahoo, Sindh's Minister for Agriculture, remarked that a possible solution would be for the largely vegetarian population of Tharparkar district to eat the insects. The problem, remaining unresolved, forced many farmers to labor continuously to drive away locusts, while many crops were eaten. Continuing to try to address the problem, some farmers demanded the government provide them with anti-insect spray.

In October 2019, the Pakistani government announced the creation of the "Ehsaas Langar Scheme" which would establish kitchens to provide free meals to needy families. In the wake of this announcement, an anti-government rally held on 23 October by the Pakistan Peoples Party was affected by the swarms

==== Natural disasters ====
Climate change severely affects Tharparkar. In addition, thunderstorms and resultant lightning strikes cause an abnormally large amount of death. In November 2015, more than 30 people and many more livestock were killed by a series of lightning strikes, resulting in a declaration of emergency in the district. Similarly, in November 2019, nine people were killed along with many more livestock.

Around 1.65 million people in Tharparkar live in houses which they have no legal entitlement to, with no city survey being conducted since 2014.

=== Social issues ===
Social issues in Tharparkar exist and are exacerbated by lack of education and awareness about problems. Suicides have become common in Tharparkar. At least 59 people including 38 women and two children committed suicide in 2019, while in 2018 about 198 suicides were reported. Increasing poverty and population displacement have been speculated to lead to these deaths.

=== Welfare ===
Many non-governmental organizations (NGOs) operate within Tharparkar, mostly in order to assist in humanitarian efforts. In 2019, Pakistan cancelled the registration of 4,693 NGOs across Sindh (including 59 in Tharparkar) that had violated government regulations.

NGO working for Tharparkar
Baanhn Beli
Food and Agriculture Organization of the United Nations
Health and Nutrition Development Society
United Nations World Food Programme
Sami Foundation
Sindh Agricultural and Forestry Workers Coordinating Organization
Society for Conservation and Protection of Environment
Sukaar Foundation
United Nations High Commissioner for Refugees
The United Nations Children's Fund (UNICEF)
Lead Against Marginality & Poverty
Sindh Water Relief Project (by Pakistan Peacekeeping Mission)
United Nation Development Programme (UNDP)
Association For Water Applied Education & Renewable Energy
Participatory Village Development Programme
United Nation World Health Organization
WaterAid
National Commission for Human Development
Pakistan Poverty Alleviation Fund
International Organization for Migration
Thardeep Rural Development Programme
Society for the Protection of the Rights of the Children (SPARC)
Quba Foundation

== Specialities ==
=== Peafowl ===
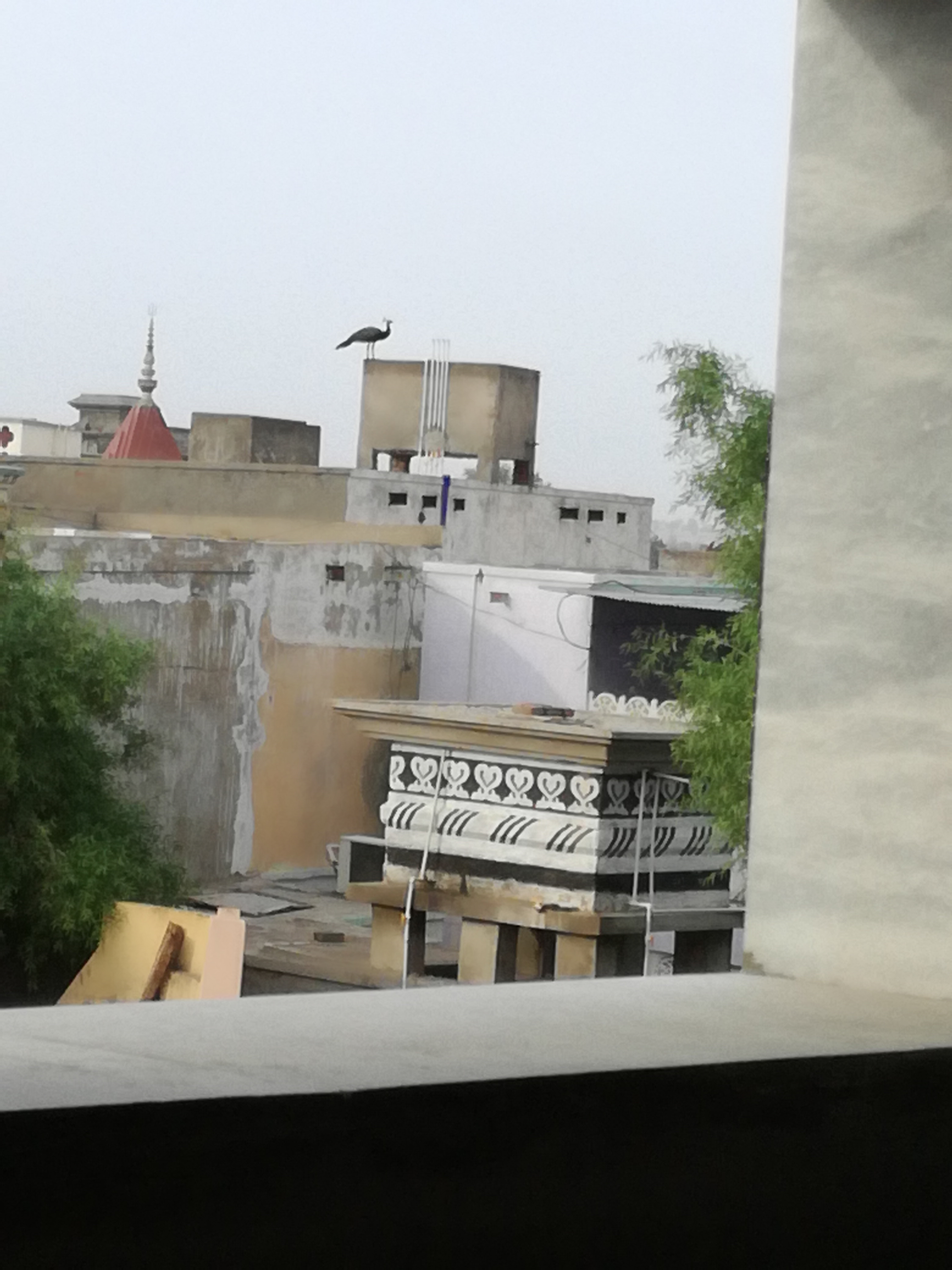
A view from a house window of a peafowl sitting on water tank(top of a house) in Tharparkar district

In Tharparkar district, the peafowls hold great significance and are considered a part of identity, pride and heritage. They are found very commonly across this region. In early mornings they are seen roaming from one house roof to other and locals often offer them grains for feeding. During rainy days such frequency is higher. Peafowls also have great history in Thar. The peafowl of Thar once caught attention of Alexander the Great while he was passing through Sindh. Further, he sent this gift of nature to his mother. Since ancient times, peafowl has remained most integral part of designs and are seen in pottery, rallis and other handlooms and art works in Thar. Many artists, poets and, singers from the land of Thar have emphasised peafowl in their work. The Sindhi folk song "Mor Tho Tilley Rana" is one of such example. Peafowl is part of cultural heritage in Tharparkar.

=== Tharparkar cattle ===
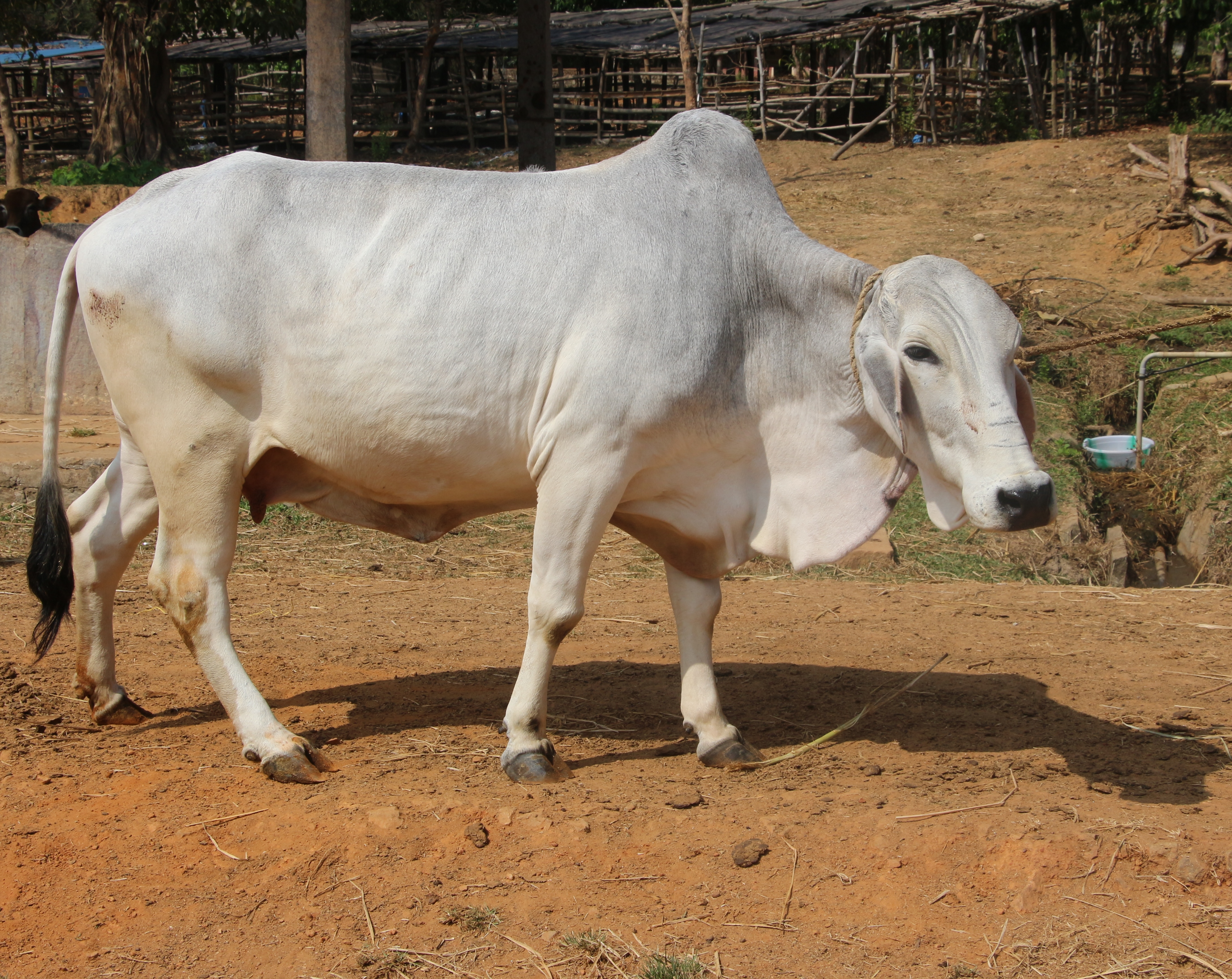
Tharparkar cattle famous since first World War

Tharparkar cattle originating in Tharparkar district is a dual purpose breed known for both its milking and draught potential. It is also known as White or Gray Sindhi, Cutchi and Thari. As specified in several reports or articles:

"The Tharparkar came into prominence during the first World War when some animals were taken to supply milk for the Near East army camps. Here their capacity for production under rigorous feeding and unfavorable environmental conditions at once became apparent. Since then many breeding herds have been assembled in India and Pakistan. When left on arid pasture the milk production is approximately 1135 kg per lactation, while those animals maintained in the villages average 1980 kg."

=== Ralli ===
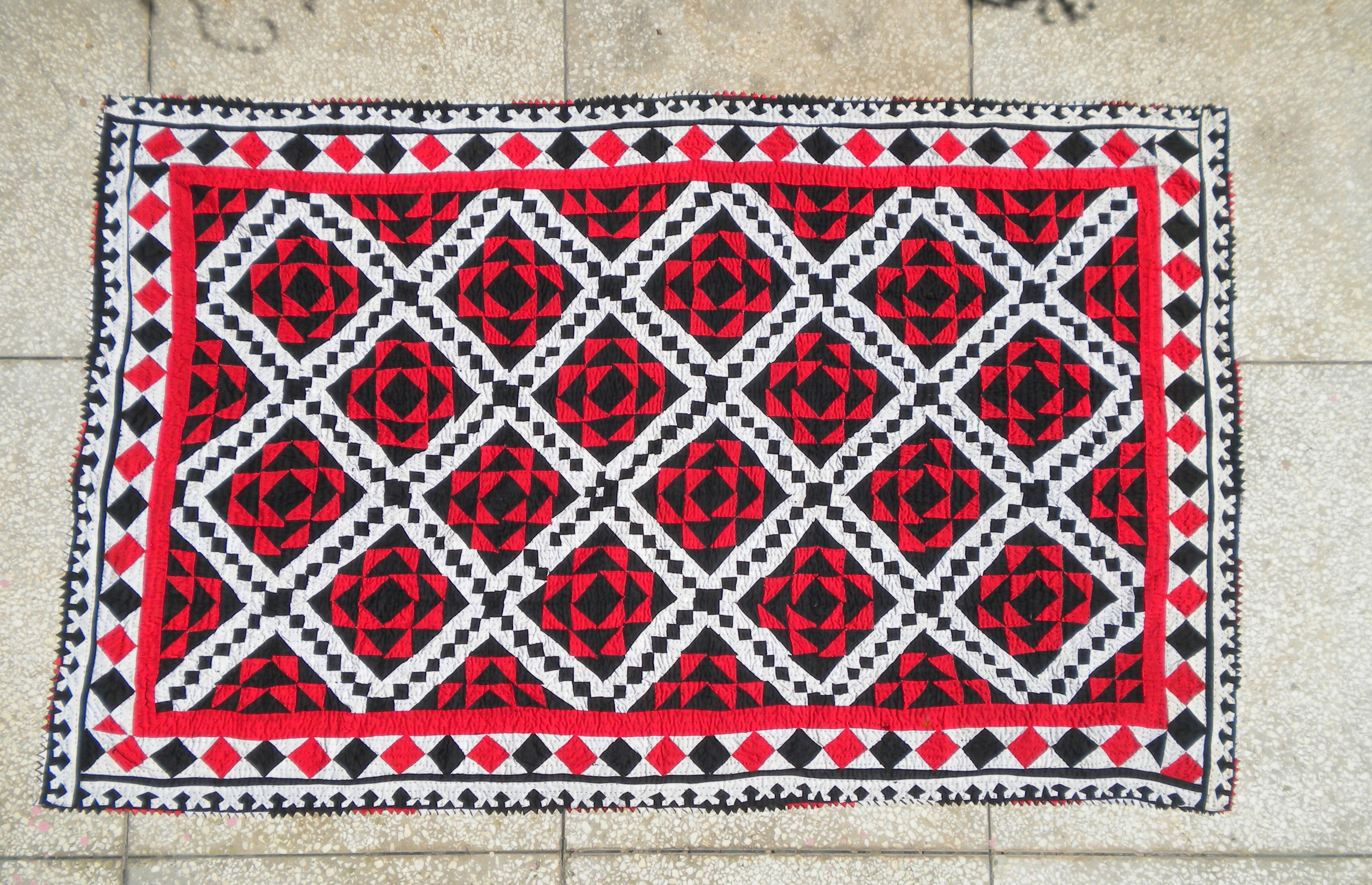
Ralli quilt

Ralli are traditional quilts made by women in the Indus Region of the Indian subcontinent. The word Ralli is derived from the local word "ralanna" which means to mix or connect. Ralli are tradition since 4th millennium BC. On trade records from the early 1500s Ralli is listed as an export item to Europe. The tradition of Ralli has passed from mother to daughter for thousands of years. Irrespective of caste, religion, occupation and tribe thousands of women make Ralli. These women belong to under privileged and poor segment who consider it as their source of income. Women spent more than 170 hours for each of this art. Like a textile currency having a value, Ralli was used for exchange of valuable things in ancient Indus Valley Civilization. For Thari rural women, Ralli is vital source of entrepreneurship and skill development. In Tharparkar, Ralli with Peacock designs are very popular.

=== Kekra Truck (Chakra) ===
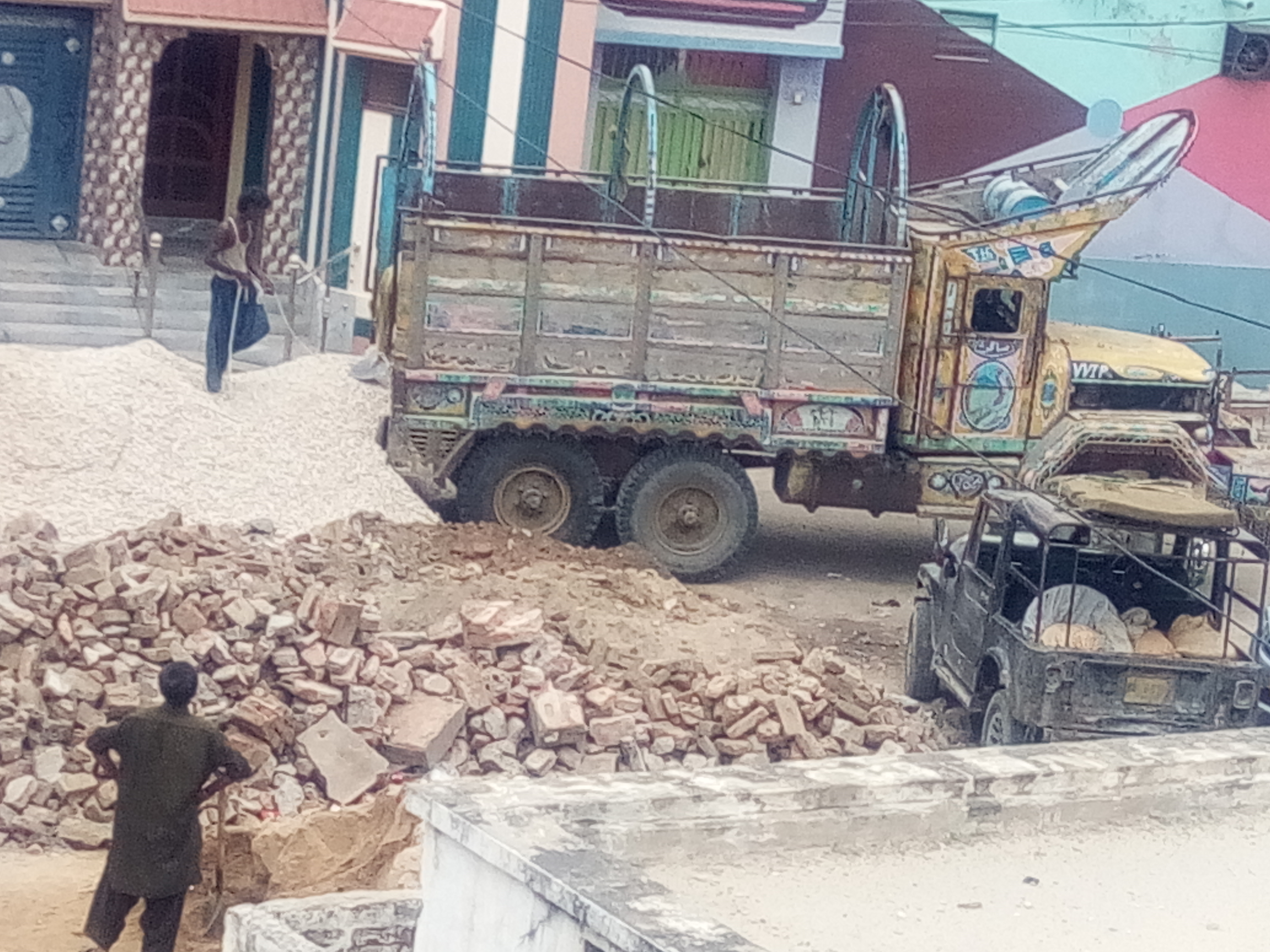
A Kekra truck unloading construction material in Tharparkar

Kekra Truck also called as Chakra by native people, is very common for the local transportation in Tharparkar. This truck is very suitable for sandy routes so it is also called 'Camel of Thar'. The truck is decorated with various designs and flowers. Since powerful Bedford engines of World War II are used in Kekras, the popularity of this truck is on the peak. Before the roads were constructed in Tharparkar, people along with their livestock and household items used to transport via Kekra. Now, with rise in road connectivity these trucks mostly transport the goods or general items. Modifications to the chassis are done to enhance the loading capacity. A typical Kekra truck is said to have capacity of 12,000 kg. Kekra trucks with traditional Thari decorations has become the tradition of transportation in Tharparkar district.

== Notable people ==
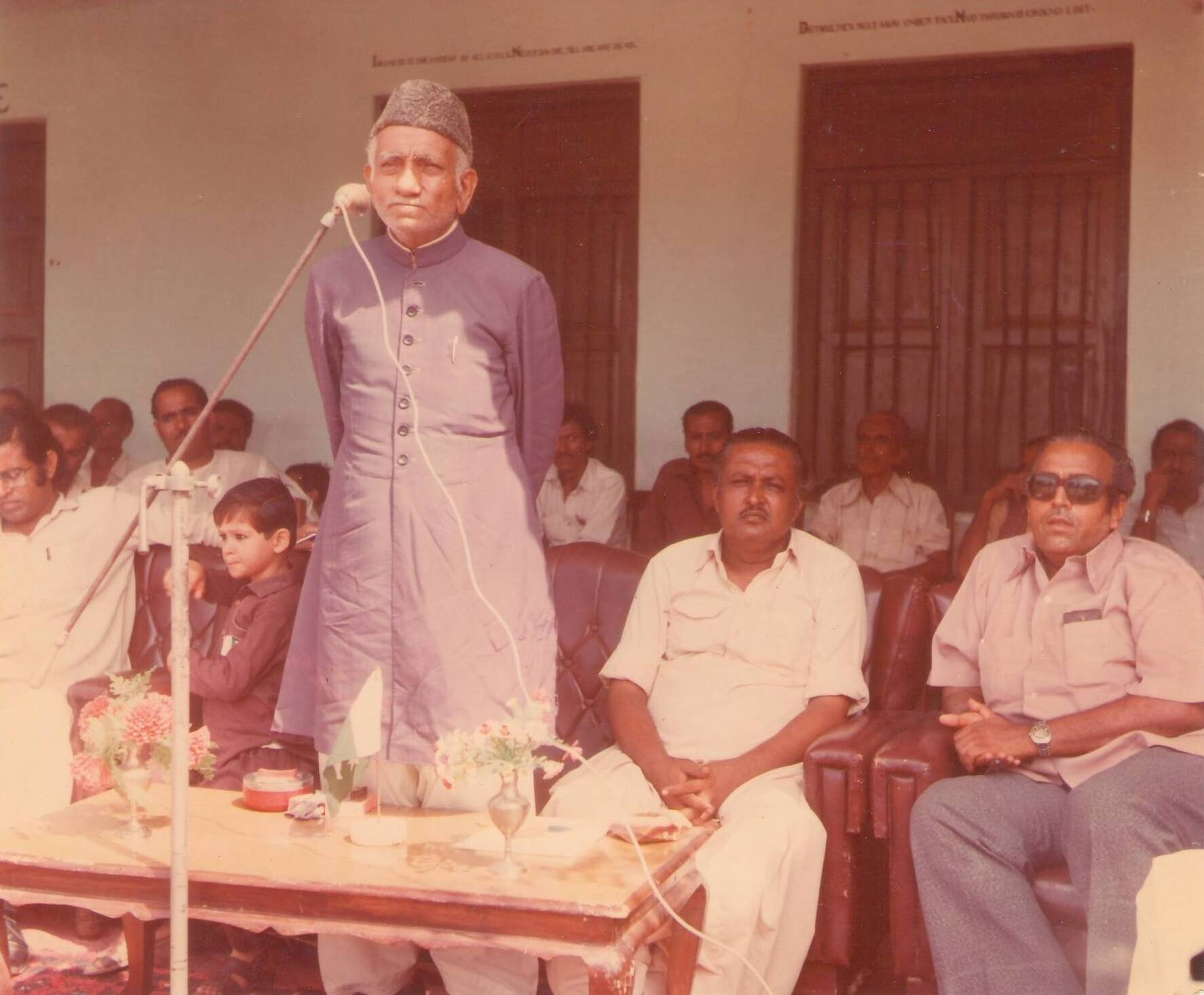
Nihalchand Pabani giving a speech on 14 August (Independence Day)

- Fozia Soomro (1966–2002) – Thari, Marwari and Sindhi folk singer.
- Mai Bhagi (Bhagbhari, 1920–1986) – Known as the Koel of Thar Desert.
- Muhammad Usman Diplai (13 June 1908 – 8 February 1981) - Writer.
- Bhawani Shankar Chowdhry, a distinguished ICT professional and electronics engineer, and receiver of Sitara-i-Imtiaz award
- Ramesh Kumar Vankwani - Politician

== See also ==
- Bherulal Balani
- Churrio Jabal
- Gori Temple
- Surendar Valasai
- Thar Desert
- Tharparkar cattle
