= Engro =

Engro (Urdu pronunciation: [ɛn.ˈɡɾoː] en-GROW) may refer to:

- Engro Holdings Limited, formerly Dawood Hercules, a Pakistani holding company
  - Engro Corporation, a conglomerate which merged with Dawood Hercules in January 2025. Subsidiaries include:
    - Engro Fertilizers
    - Engro Polymer
    - Engro Powergen Thar
- Engro Foundation, a philanthropic foundation associated with the Engro Corporation
