= Gorano =

Pakistani village

گورانو (Sindhi)
- Village
- Gorano
- Location within Sindh
- Coordinates: 24°31′19″N 70°22′3″E
- Country: Pakistan
- Province: Sindh
- Division: Mirpur Khas
- District: Tharparkar
- Time zone: UTC+5 (PST)

Gorano (Note: Sindhi: گورانو, pronounced [ɡoːˈraːnoː]) is a village in Tharparkar District, Sindh, Pakistan. It is located in Islamkot Taluka, 50 kilometres (31 mi) south-east of the district capital Mithi, 30 kilometres (19 mi) south-east of Islamkot, and about 20 kilometres (12 mi) north of the international border with Gujarat, India, at the Rann of Kutch. The village comprises slightly more than 500 households.

Gorano experiences a hot deserts climate, marked by long, hot, and dry summers with up to over 45 °C (113 °F) and short, mild winters with minimal 18 °C (64 °F).

The local economy is based mainly on livestock rearing and subsistence agriculture, both dependent on scarce and variable water resources.

The village lies around 17 kilometres (11 mi) south of the Nagarpakar Road, within the desert area of Tharparkar and is dependent on limited water supplies, primarily through local wells and periodic deliveries.

== Gorano Reservoir ==
Adjacent to the settlement is the Gorano reservoir, covering an area of approximately 500 acres. The International Union for Conservation of Nature (IUCN) has identified it as a wetland formed in deep subsoil. The reservoir is used by the Sindh Engro Coal Mining Company (SECMC), (Note: The Government of Sindh holds 51% of the joint venture.) for disposal of wastewater from Thar Coalfield Block II.
