= Thar Engro Coal Power Project =

Thar Coal Mine

Engro Powergen Thar Coal Plant (Thar Block II)
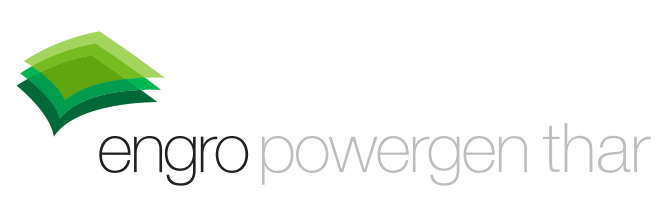
- Location of the Thar Engro Coal Power Project
- Official name: Thar Coal Block II
- Country: Pakistan
- Location: Tharparkar district, Sindh
- Coordinates: 24.812°N 70.398°E
- Status: Operational
- Construction began: 2014
- Commission date: 10 April 2019
- Construction cost: $995 million USD
- Owner: Engro Powergen Thar Ltd.

Thermal power station
- Primary fuel: Lignite

Power generation
- Nameplate capacity: 660 MW

The Engro Thar Coal Power Project (Thar-ll), also known as Engro Powergen Thar, is a coal-fired power plant developed as part of the China–Pakistan Economic Corridor by Sindh Engro Coal Mining Company (a joint venture between the government of Sindh and Engro Corporation) and China Machinery Engineering Corporation in the Thar Block-II of the Thar Coalfield, Tharparkar District, Sindh, Pakistan 25 kilometers from the town of Islamkot near the village of Singharo-Bitra.

== Background ==
In May 2008, the Government of Sindh invited proposals for the development of Thar Coal reserves through a public-private partnership basis. The Sindh Engro Coal Mining Company (SECMC) was formed as a joint venture between Government of Sindh (GoS) and Engro Corporation in October 2009 in order to develop of mining at Thar Coal Block II of the Thar coalfield. In May 2013, a power company in the name of Thar Power Company Ltd. (THARCO) was incorporated as a subsidiary of SECMC with the mandate to develop the first power project based on coal mined by SECMC. As per the JV agreement, Engro is responsible for Project Management and Financing, while GoS for Infrastructural Development and attaining requisite consents and approvals for the project.

== Project details ==
The first phase of the project will yield 660 megawatts of electricity, with subsequent phases eventually increasing power generation capacity. The consortium will also develop an adjoining open cast coal mine capable of producing up to 3.8 million tons of coal per year at depths of 135 meters as part of the first phase of the Thar-II Project. The first phase is expected to be completed by early 2019 at a cost of $1.95 billion, with the mine itself costing $789 million.

The initial phase will consist of two 330 MW plants which each will have a "Sub-Critical Circulating Fluidized Bed," boiler, steam turbine, and generator. Electricity generated from the project will be connected to the national electricity grid at Matiari, from where power can be directed to Karachi or towards northern Pakistan via the Matiari to Lahore and Matiari to Faisalabad 660 kilovolt transmission lines. In addition to power plant construction, the government of Sindh is currently widening and rehabilitating the road from Thatta to the Thar coalfield at a cost of $100 million.

The mine will then be expanded to yield 6.5 million tonnes per annum of coal to support two addition 330 MW power plant within one year of completion of the initial 660 MW project. While establishing the mine will cost $789 million, the cost required to increase mine capacity from 3.8 to 6.5 million tons per annum will cost an additional $124.7 million as the incremental cost of mining capacity expansion is low.

In Phase II, the mine will be expanded to yield 13.5 million tonnes of coal to support power plants to yield 2400 MW of electricity. In Phase III of the project, the mine will be expanded to yield 19.5 million tonnes of coal annually in order to support 3600 MW of power generation.

== Tariff ==
The National Electric Power Regulatory Authority of Pakistan has agreed to a tariff of 8.5015 cents/unit for the first 330 MW of electricity, 8.3341 cents/unit for the next 660 MW of electricity, and 7.9889 cents/unit for the next 1,099 MW of electricity. The tariff rates are valid for 30 years, and is based on a debt equity ratio of 75:25.

== Local effects of the project ==
The villages of Senhri dars, Seengaro, Bitara, Aban Jo Tar and Thareo Halepoto will require relocation in order to develop the project, at a cost of $62 million. Developers of the project also have pledged to re-fill coal pits once coal reserves are exhausted, and have also pledged to "plant hundreds of thousands of indigenous trees to maintain the natural ecosystem of the desert." Developers of the project also predict that 3,000 unskilled workers will be required for construction, and have stated that all these workers would be recruited from the local Thar population, and an additional 1,400 semi-skilled workers.

== See also ==
- Thar Coalfield
- Thar Desert
- List of power stations in Pakistan
