= Layakharo =

- Village
- Layakharo
- Location within Sindh
- Coordinates: 24.28°N 69.35°E
- Country: Pakistan
- Province: Sindh
- District: Tharparkar
- Elevation: 26 m (85 ft)

Population (1998)
  - Total: 2,289 (327 households)
  - Density: 1/km^{2} (2.6/sq mi)
- Time zone: UTC+5 (PST)

Layakahro village is located in Tehsil, Diplo in the District of Tharparkar, Sindh, Pakistan.

== Geography ==
Layakharo is 13 km north east of Diplo Town and situated in the Thar Desert.

It has A Cricket play ground where player's playing cricket and more matches like that

Layakharo have three mosque on 2024 M.

== Education ==
Government High School Layakharo is an educational institution located in Layakharo, Tharparkar District, Sindh, Pakistan. It provides secondary education to students in the area. The school is known for its commitment to improving education standards and has been serving the local community for many years.

== See also ==
- Sant Nenuram Ashram
