= Islamkot Tehsil =

Pakistani administrative area

Islamkot Tehsil Sindhi: تعلقو اسلام ڪوٽ
- Tehsil of Tharparkar District

- Location within Sindh Location within Pakistan
- Coordinates: 24°42′0″N 70°11′0″E
- Country: Pakistan
- Province: Sindh
- District: Tharparkar District
- Tehsil: Tehsil

Area
  - Tehsil of Tharparkar District: 3,515 km^{2} (1,357 sq mi)
- Elevation: 56.48 m (185.3 ft)

Population (2023)
  - Tehsil of Tharparkar District: 265,643
  - Density: 75.57/km^{2} (195.7/sq mi)
  - Urban: 19,064 (7.18%)
  - Rural: 246,579 (92.82%)

Literacy
  - Literacy rate: Total: (36.01%); Male: (48.29%); Female: (22.97%)
- Time zone: UTC+5 (PST)
- Main languages: 262,626 Sindhi, 233 Pashto, 158 Hindko

Islamkot Tehsil (Note: Sindhi: تعلقو اسلام ڪوٽ, pronounced [taʕˈlu.qu ɪsˈlaːm koːʈ], Urdu: تحصیل اسلام کوٹ, pronounced [tɛhˈsiːl ɪsˈlaːm koːʈ]), also referred to as Islamkot Taluka, is an administrative sub-subdivision (taluka/tehsil) of Tharparkar District, in south-eastern Sindh, Pakistan. Located about 82 kilometres (51 mi) east of the district capital Mithi, and around 360 kilometres (220 mi) east of Karachi, it forms the southern part of the district and borders the Great Rann of Kutch. (Note: This salt marsh in the Thar Desert forms seasonal wetlands, mainly situated across the international boundary with Kutch district in Gujarat, India.)

According to the 2023 national census, it had a population of 265,643. The majority of residents speak Sindhi. It is one of seven tehsils of Tharparkar, and is connected by both road and air.

== Geography ==
Islamkot Tehsil, situated at an average elevation of 50 metres (160 ft), covers an area of about 3,515 square kilometres (1,357 sq mi), accounting for roughly 17.9% of Tharparkar District's total area.

It is bounded by Diplo Taluka and Mithi Taluka to the west, Chachro Tehsil to the north, and Nagarparkar Tehsil to the east, while its southern boundary forms part of the international border with India.

== Climate ==
Islamkot has a hot desert climate (Köppen climate classification). Average temperatures are around 32.5 °C (90.5 °F), rising to 44 °C (111 °F)-48 °C (118 °F) in summer, which is over 11.6% higher than Pakistan's national average. Rainfall is scarce and highly seasonal, with about 15.99 millimetres (0.630 in) falling on roughly 20 days per year, mostly during June to September monsoon, when local rivers briefly flow before drying up again in the long dry season.

== Flora and Fauna ==
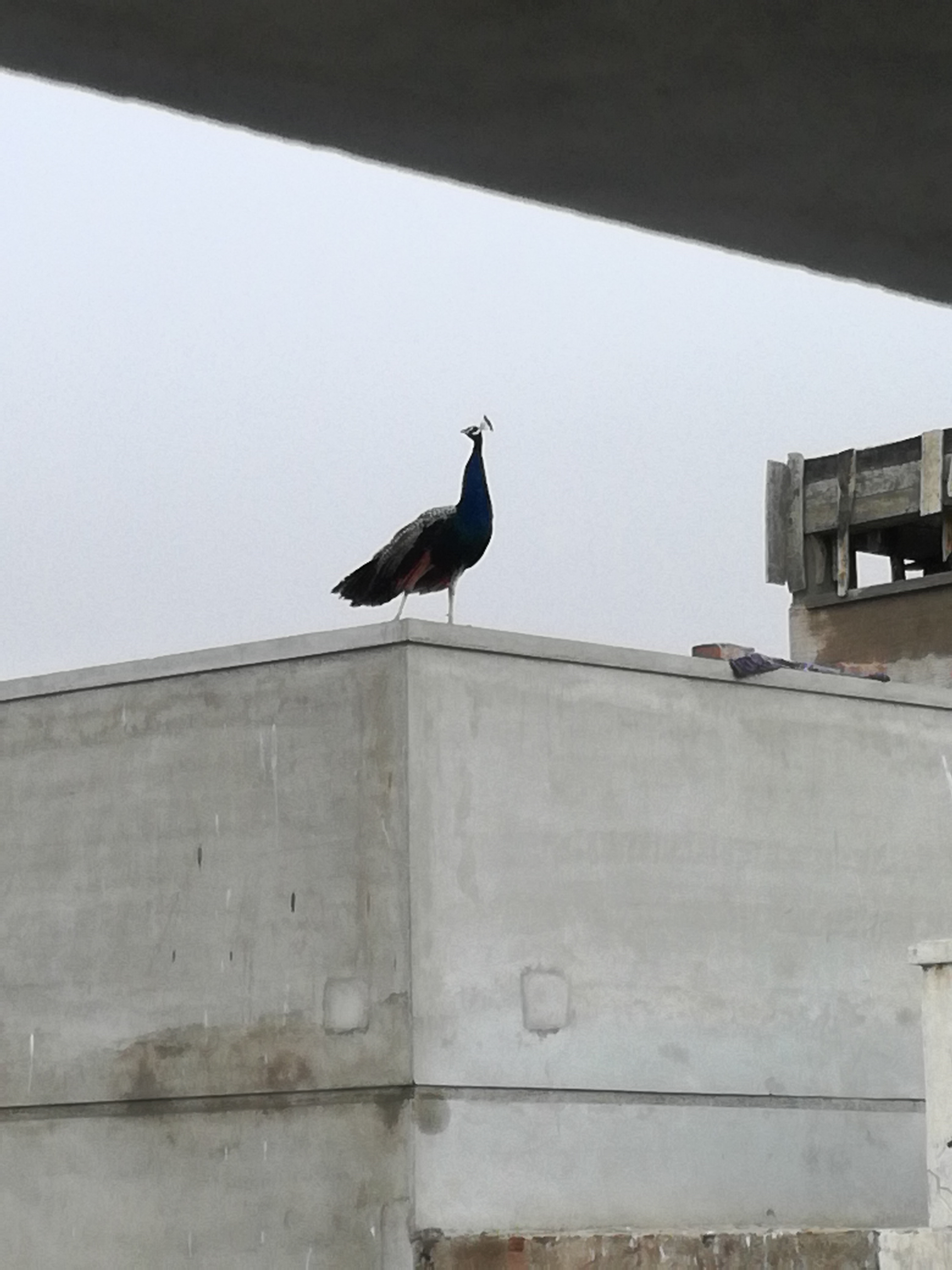
Peahen in Islamkot town

Its vegetation is typical of the Thar Desert, dominated by xerophytic plants adapted to arid conditions. Common species include shrubs such as Prosopis cineraria (locally known as khejri), Capparis decidua (karir), and Salvadora oleoides (jal). Grasses like Cenchrus biflorus and Lasiurus scindicus dominate the sandy areas and provide seasonal fodder for livestock. Neem trees (Azadirachta indica) are also widely planted to provide shade and greenery in the desert landscape. Vegetation cover increases during the monsoon season, when rainfall supports temporary cultivation and the growth of wild grasses and herbs across the sand dunes and plains.

A 2015 survey of the Thar Desert recorded 35 species of mammals in the talukas of Tharparkar District. Rodents were the most common, followed by Carnivora, along with insectivores, bats, lagomorph, and several hoofed animals.

== Demographics ==
The 2023 census recorded 265,643 inhabitants living in 52,507 households. The population density is about 75.5 persons per square kilometre. The literacy rate is 36.01%, with significant gender disparities: 48.29% for males and just 22.97% for females, reflecting limited educational access, particularly for women and girls.

=== Religion ===
Religions in Islamkot tehsil (2023)
Religion	Percent
Hinduism	62.27%
Islam	37.64%
Other or not stated	0.09%

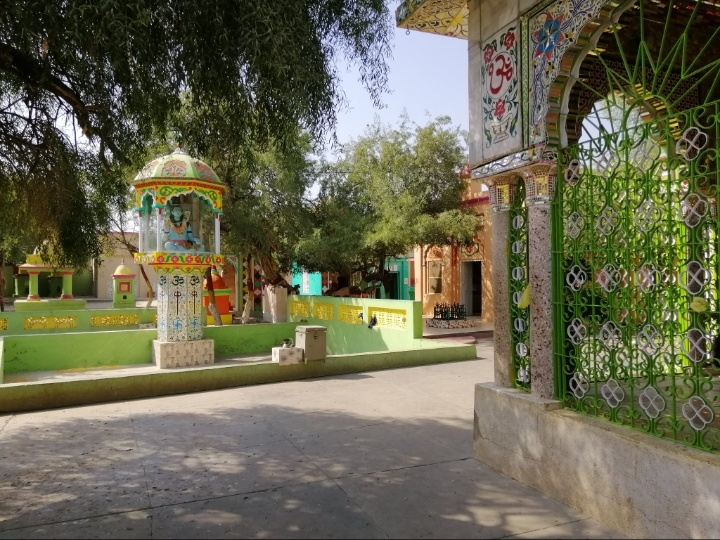
Sant Nenuram Ashram

Hinduism is followed by majority of the tehsil's population. The region is known for religious harmony and coexistence between Hindu and Muslim communities. The Sant Nenuram Ashram is one of the major shrine centre in the region.

=== Languages ===
Of the 2023 population of 265,643, Sindhi was spoken by about 98.86% of the residents (262,626 people). Other languages including Pashto (0.09%, 233 people), Hindko (0.06%, 158 people) and various others (0.99%, 2,626 people).

== Economy ==
The majority of residents depends on subsistence agriculture and livestock rearing, in line with broader patterns in Tharparkar District. About three-quarter of the population are engaged in livestock management and approximately 73% rely on rain-fed farming and animal husbandry. In recent years, development of the Thar Coalfield has introduced wage labour opportunities. More than 35,000 jobs have been created, with about 80% of these positions held by local residents from Sindh.

== Infrastructure ==
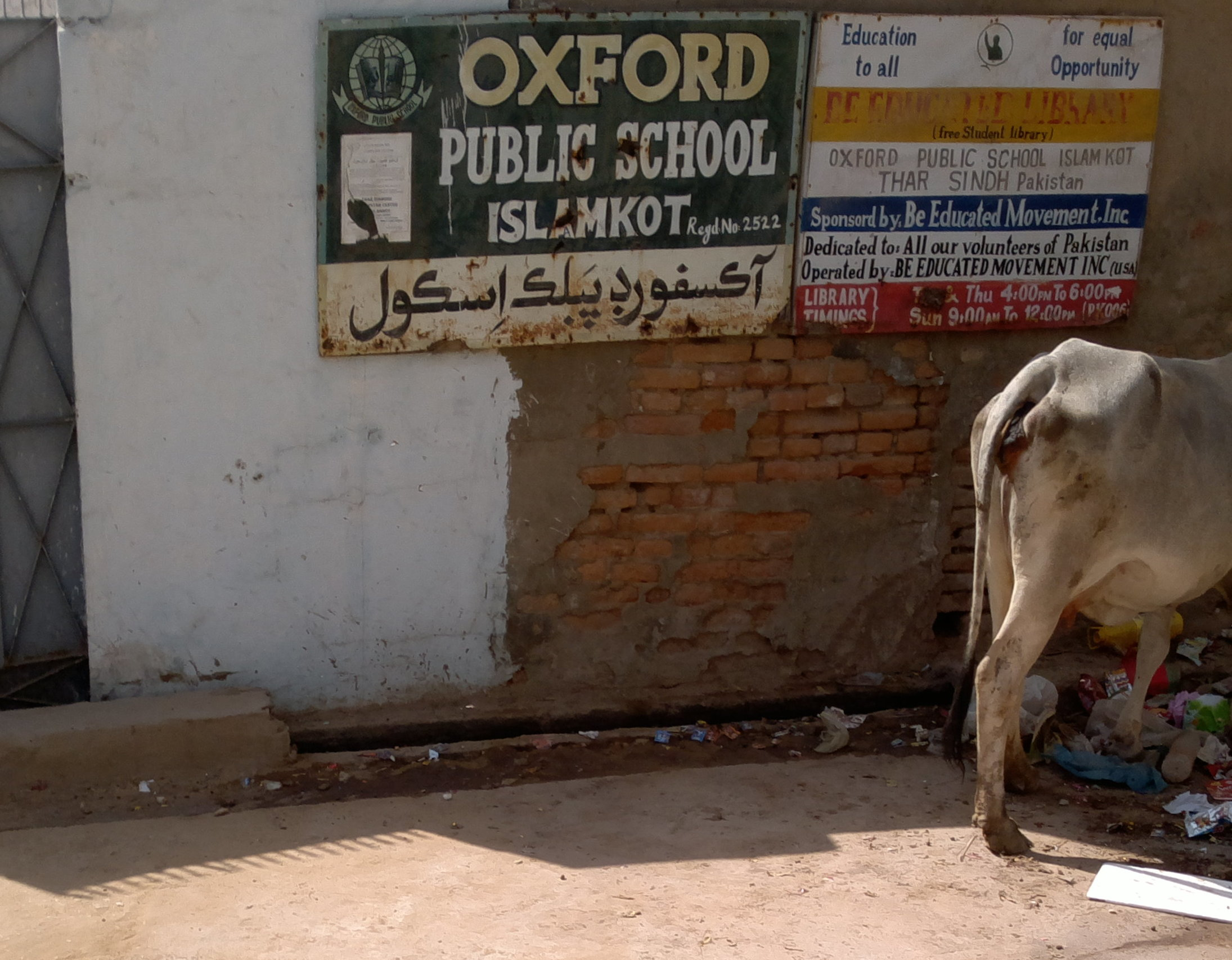
Entrance board of a school in Islamkot

Islamkot Tehsil is linked by metalled roads to nearby towns such as Mithi, Chachro, and Nagarparkar, many of which were historically tree-lined to provide shade. The Mai Bakhtawar International Airport, located 20 kilometres (12 mi) north of Islamkot near the village of Alho Kotrio, was built by the Pakistan Civil Aviation Authority to support access to the Thar coalfield. It was inaugurated in April 2018 and features a 7,000 feet (2,100 m) runway, though regular commercial operations remain limited.

Telecommunication services have expanded significantly, with mobile networks covering most settlements. In 2017, free Wi-Fi services were also introduced in some villages through Public–private partnerships.

Water supply remains a critical challenge due to the arid climate. A large Reverse osmosis plant with a capacity of 1.5 million gallons per day, is being rehabilitated to improve access to clean water, complemented by pipeline upgrades in the region, though challenges persist.

Electricity is mainly provided through the Sindh Engro Coal Mining Company (SECMC) projects linked to the Thar Coalfield, which have extended grid connections to Islamkot and surrounding villages, significantly improving local electrification.

== See also ==
- Diplo Tehsil
- Mithi Tehsil
