= Thar Institute of Engineering, Science, and Technology, Tharparkar =

Educational institution in Pakistan

Thar Institute of Engineering, Science, and Technology
- Type: Government
- Established: 2019
- Academic affiliations: NED Karachi
- Principal: Professor Dr. Nasir Uddin Shaikh
- Location: Mithi, Sindh, Pakistan; 24.5955°N 70.5507°E
- Campus: 300 Acres; Sub Campus
- Website: tiest.neduet.edu.pk
- Location within Sindh Location within Pakistan

NED University established the Thar Institute of Engineering, Sciences & Technology (TIEST) at Islamkot, in the Sindhi region of Tharparkar, about 350 kilometers to the east of Karachi. The goal of this institute is to develop highly skilled professionals from the isolated and underprivileged residents of this district and its surroundings, as well as to supply skilled labor force for the province's quickly expanding coal mining and power generation businesses.

== History ==
TIEST was founded in 2019 with a BS in Computer Science program, followed in 2021 by a Civil Engineering program. In the next years, additional engineering programs, such as those in mechanical engineering, electrical engineering, chemical engineering, and mining engineering, will begin.

TIEST is now housed in temporary structures, but will ultimately relocate to its main campus, which is being built on a 300-acre plot of land on the main road leading to Islamkot, almost in the middle of the cities of Mithi and Islamkot. The distance between the Airport and the main campus of TIEST is also manageable. In 2025, the first phase of the institute was inaugurated.

== Departments ==
Computer Science/IT

Civil Engineering
