= Cadet College Mithi =

Military high school in Sindh, Pakistan

- Mithi, Tharparkar; Sindh Pakistan

Information
- Type: Military High School
- Motto: Striving For Excellence
- Established: 2012
- Area: 89 acres (0.36 km^{2})
- Colour: Red
- Demonym: Tharians
- Houses: 5
- Website: https://ccm.edu.pk/

Cadet College Mithi is a military preparatory institution located in Mithi, Sindh, Pakistan. Established in 2012 and approved by then-President Asif Ali Zardari, the college aims to provide a rigorous academic and military training program to prepare cadets for leadership roles in the Pakistani Armed Forces and other professions.
