= Islamkot =

Town in Sindh, Pakistan

Islamkot Sindhi: اسلام ڪوٽ
- Town
- Nicknames: Neem Tree Town
- Location within Sindh Location within Pakistan
- Coordinates: 24°43′N 70°12′E
- Country: Pakistan
- Province: Sindh
- Division: Mirpur Khas
- District: Tharparkar

Area
  - Total: 6.55 km^{2} (2.53 sq mi)
- Elevation: 56 m (184 ft)

Population (2023)
  - Total: 19,064
- Time zone: UTC+5 (PST)
- Calling code: 0232

Islamkot is a town in Tharparkar district in the south-eastern Sindh, Pakistan. (Note: Sindhi: اسلام ڪوٽ, pronounced [ɪsˈlaːm koːʈ], Urdu: اسلام کوٹ, pronounced [ɪsˈlaːm koːʈ]) It is also known as the Neem Tree Town due to the abundance of neem trees. It has gained prominence due to its proximity to the Thar coalfield and the development of power generation projects, which making it a centre for investment and urban expansion in the region. It functions as a town council and serves as the administrative headquarters of Islamkot Tehsil in Tharparkar District.

== Geography ==
Islamkot lies in the Thar Desert, about 42 kilometres (26 mi) east of the district headquarters at Mithi and just over 40 kilometres (25 mi) north of the international border with India's Kutch District in Gujarat.

== Demographics ==
According to the 2023 census, the town's population stands at is 19,064, compared to 18,512 recorded in the 2017 Pakistani census. However some other official reports puts the 2017 population at 24,880, reflecting an annual growth rate of 4.68%, nearly double that recorded in 1998. The growth is broadly attributed to planned and ongoing development initiatives in the area.

=== Religion ===
Religions in Islamkot (2023)
| Religion | Percent |
| Hinduism | 78.83% |
| Islam | 21.17% |

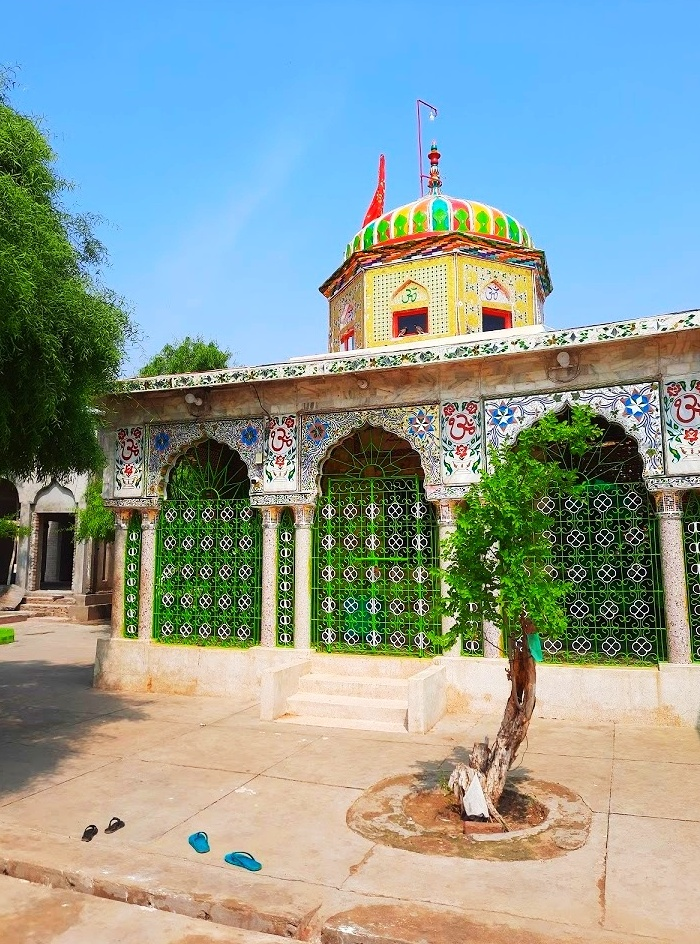
Sant Nenuram Ashram

The majority of the town's population follows Hinduism, with Muslims constituting a significant minority. The region is the birthplace of the Hindu saint Shri Sant Nenuram, the Nenuram Ashram, established in his memory, remains an active place of pilgrimage and is situated at the centre of the town.

=== Language ===
Sindhi (99%) is spoken by almost all of the town's population. They speak mainly the Dhatki dialect of Sindhi.

== Economy ==
Commerce in Islamkot is centred on the sale of food, consumer goods, and household items. Despite a relatively high number of shops, customer turnover is modest. The town is located on a major highway between Mithi and Nagarparkar, serving as a stopover point for travellers and tourists, especially during the monsoon season.

== Urban growth ==
Urban expansion has increased significantly in recent years, particularly along the Mithi–Islamkot road and in the town's northeast and southwest outskirts. Growth has, however, been largely unplanned. The built-up area expanded from 2.4 square kilometres (0.93 sq mi) in 2004 to 6.55 square kilometres (2.53 sq mi) in 2018, according to satellite imagery.

== Development ==
The exploitation of vast coal reserves and the establishment of mining blocks are transforming the settlement's economic and physical landscape. To manage this anticipated growth, the Government of Sindh has initiated a 20-year 'Development Master Plan' to provide guidelines for sustainable urban development. Islamkot has also been designated to become the first Sustainable Development Goal (SDG)–compliant taluka (tehsil) in Sindh.

== See also ==
- Mithi
