= Engro Polymer & Chemicals Limited =

Pakistani polymer and caustic soda manufacturer

Engro Polymer & Chemical
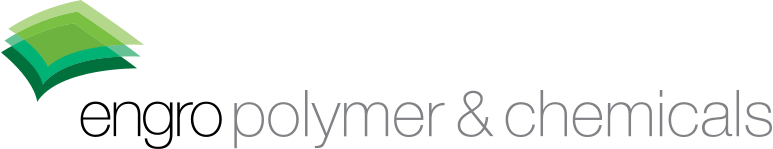

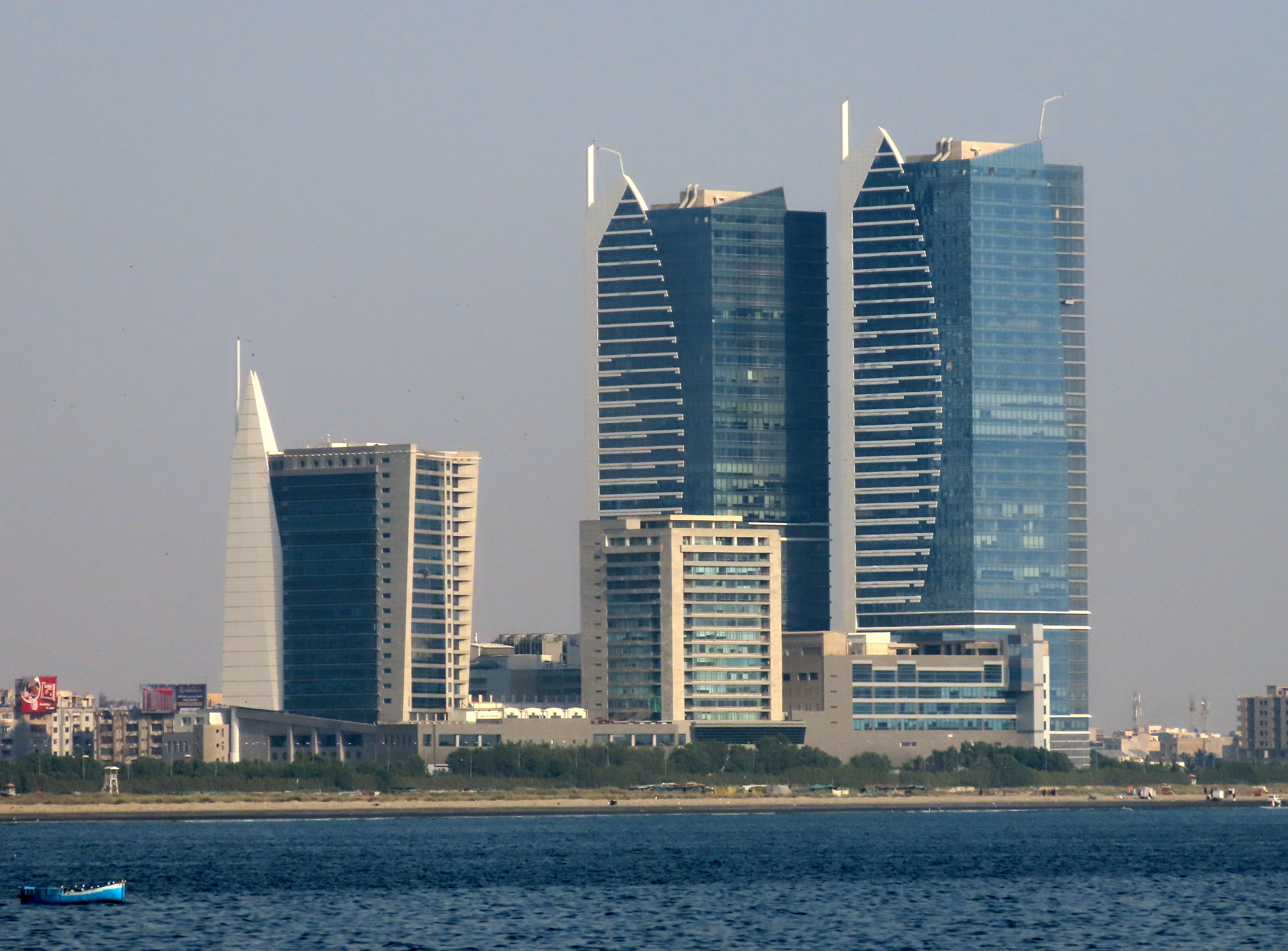
- Engro Polymer's headquarters, located in the Harbour Front Building (left tower) of Dolmen City.
- Formerly: Engro Asahi Polymer Chemical Limited (1997–2006)
- Company type: Public
- Traded as: PSX: EPCL; KSE 100 component
- Industry: Chemical
- Founded: 1997; 29 years ago
- Headquarters: Harbour Front Building, Clifton, Karachi-75600, Pakistan
- Key people: Abdul Qayoom (CEO)
- Products: Caustic soda, polyvinyl chloride, and vinyl chloride monomer
- Production output: PVC: 295 kT per annum Caustic soda: 106 kT per annum VCM: 245 kT per annum
- Revenue: ▼ Rs. 75.707 billion (US$270 million) (2024)
- Operating income: ▼ Rs. 4.386 billion (US$16 million) (2024)
- Net income: ▼ Rs. −160.583 million (US$−570,000) (2024)
- Total assets: ▲ Rs. 100.851 billion (US$360 million) (2024)
- Total equity: ▼ Rs. 27.321 billion (US$98 million) (2024)
- Owner: Engro Corporation (56.19%); Mitsubishi Corporation (11%); Nadeem Nisar Danka (10%)
- Number of employees: 540 (2024)
- Parent: Engro Corporation
- Subsidiaries: Think Pvc; Engro Plastisizer; Engro Peroxide
- Website: engropolymer.com
- Footnotes / references Financials as of 31 December 2024

Engro Polymer & Chemical Limited (Urdu pronunciation: [ɛn.ˈɡɾoː ˈpɒ.lɪ.mər] en-GROW-POL-ih-mər) is a Pakistani polymer manufacturing company based in Karachi, Pakistan. It is a subsidiary of Engro Corporation with a local market share of more than 70%.

== History ==
Engro Polymer & Chemicals was founded in 1997 as part of Engro Chemical Pakistan.

In November 1997, the company entered into a joint venture agreement with Mitsubishi Corporation and Asahi Glass Company to build a polyvinyl chloride (PVC) manufacturing plant. The $80 million project was financed with $37 million in equity and $39 million in long-term debt. Engro contributed 50 percent of the equity ($18.5 million), Asahi 30 percent ($11.1 million), and Mitsubishi 20 percent ($7.4 million). Foreign currency debt of $28.5 million came from the International Finance Corporation and CDC, while local currency debt of $10.5 million and working capital of $4 million were provided by various Pakistani and international banks. The facility was constructed at Port Qasim, in close proximity to the city of Karachi. The plant was engineered to produce 100,000 tonnes of suspension grade PVC resin per year. The production of PVC at the facility began in 1999.

In 2006, Engro Polymer commissioned a chlor vinyl complex, allowing for in-house production of intermediaries such as vinyl chloride monomer with a capacity of 204,000 tpa and chlorine with a capacity of 94,200 tpa. The expansion project cost approximately $250 million, which included $30 million loan and $20 million equity investment from the International Finance Corporation. It increased its PVC production capacity to 150,000 tons. In the same year, the company was renamed to Engro Polymer & Chemicals Limited after Engro Corporation acquired Asahi Glass stake.

Since 2008, Engro Polymer is listed on the Karachi Stock Exchange, following an initial public offering at a strike price of PKR 18.

In August 2018, Engro Polymer announced that the company would set up a new plant to expand the production of PVC and caustic soda. Along with an efficiency project such as de-super heating quenches at EDC/VCM plant.
