= Thar Coal Railway =

Transportation infrastructure project in Pakistan

Overview
- Service type: Railway Infrastructure
- Status: Under Development
- Locale: Thar, Pakistan
- Current operator: Pakistan Railway Freight Transportation Company (PRFTC)

Route
- Termini: Thar Coal Mines; National Railway Network
- Distance travelled: 105 kilometers

The Thar Coal Railway is a infrastructure project focused on linking the Thar coal deposit to Pakistan's Railway network. Funding for this project is expected to be secured soon, with the overall project cost amounting to Rs 58.240 billion. The financing will follow an equal cost-sharing approach through the Public Sector Development Programme and the Annual Development Plan.

== History ==
A bankable feasibility study for the Thar Coal Mines Rail connectivity with the National Railways Network was carried out between July 2019 and March 2020. The primary objective of this study was to comprehensively assess the potential for extending rail links strategically and to provide recommendations for the effective implementation of the project.

On 5 October 2022, former Prime Minister Shehbaz Sharif issued a directive to establish a link between the Thar Coal Mines and the national railway network by March 2023. This crucial connection aims to enable the utilization of local coal from ]Thar in power plants, effectively replacing the need for imported coal. The shift to local coal is anticipated to result in substantial savings of up to $2 billion per year.

The entity responsible for spearheading the development of this project is the Pakistan Railway Freight Transportation Company (PRFTC). The key focus of this company is to manage the transportation of freight, with a specific emphasis on coal, by rail from the port area in Karachi to destinations up-country.

== Stations ==
The stations will be:

- Islamkot

Some stations will be in between

- New Chhor (On Hyderabad-Khokhrapar Branch Line)

== Project Details ==
The project involves the construction of a 105-kilometer railway line that will connect Thar coal mines to Bin Qasim. The primary objective is to establish a seamless connection between the coal mines in Sindh and both the national and global energy markets. The proposed railway line will extend from Thar Coal Block -II and integrate with the existing railway network. Additionally, a double rail line will be established from the Bin Qasim railways to the Port Qasim Terminal, enhancing transportation capabilities.
