= Dolmen Malls =

Pakistani shopping mall chain

- مراکز خرید ڈولمین
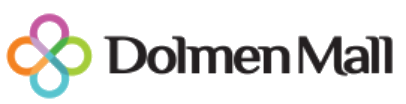

General information
- Type: Shopping mall
- Location: Dolmen City, The Harbour Front, Marine Drive, Clifton, Karachi, Pakistan

Design and construction
- Developer: Dolmen Group

Website
- www.dolmenmalls.com

Dolmen Malls is a chain of shopping malls in Pakistan owned and operated by Dolmen Group, a Karachi-based real estate development and investment company established in 1984. The company is involved in the development and management of commercial, residential, and mixed-use projects across Pakistan, including Dolmen City, a large waterfront complex in Karachi.

The Dolmen Malls chain operates retail developments in Karachi and Lahore, including Dolmen Mall Clifton, Dolmen Mall Tariq Road, Dolmen Mall Hyderi, and Dolmen Mall Lahore. Since the early 2000s, the malls have been associated with the growth of organized retail infrastructure and the expansion of modern shopping mall culture in Pakistan.

Several Dolmen developments combine retail, dining, entertainment, and office facilities as part of mixed-use developments. Dolmen Mall Clifton, located within the larger Dolmen City development on Karachi's Clifton waterfront, is one of the group's largest retail developments.

== History ==
Dolmen Group was established in 1984 and initially focused on residential and commercial real estate projects in Karachi. During the 1990s, the company expanded into organized retail development at a time when enclosed shopping malls and integrated commercial centers remained relatively limited in Pakistan.

The group's first retail mall project, Dolmen Mall Tariq Road, opened in 2000 along Karachi's Tariq Road commercial corridor. The development combined shopping, dining, and entertainment facilities within an enclosed retail environment.

In 2008, Dolmen Group expanded its retail portfolio by opening Dolmen Mall Hyderi in North Nazimabad.

The company later developed Dolmen Mall Clifton in 2011 as part of the larger Dolmen City mixed-use project located on Karachi's Clifton waterfront. The project integrated retail facilities with office towers, residential developments, and waterfront commercial infrastructure.

During the COVID-19 pandemic in Pakistan, Dolmen City REIT announced rental relief measures for tenants operating at Dolmen Mall Clifton and Harbour Front Towers in response to the economic impact of the pandemic on retailers and commercial businesses.

In 2024, The company expanded its operations beyond Karachi with the opening of Dolmen Mall Lahore in the Defence Housing Authority area of Lahore. The project represented Dolmen Group's first retail development in Punjab.

== Locations ==
=== Dolmen Mall Clifton ===
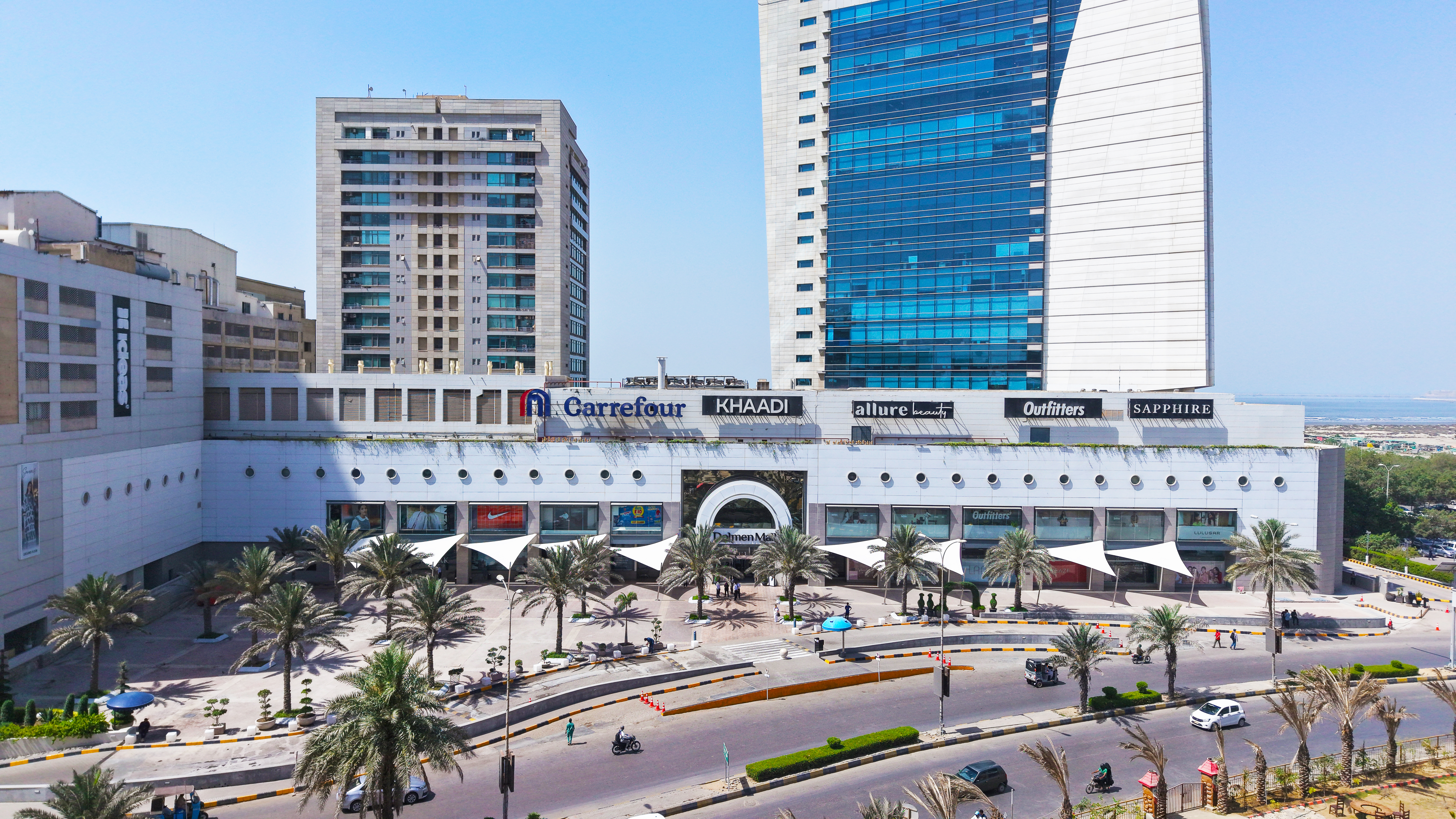
Front view of Dolmen Mall Clifton in Karachi

Dolmen Mall Clifton is located within the Dolmen City mixed-use complex on the Clifton waterfront in Karachi. Opened in 2011, the development integrates retail outlets, restaurants, office spaces, entertainment facilities, and structured parking infrastructure within a large-scale waterfront commercial environment.

The mall forms part of the wider Dolmen City development, which includes office towers, residential buildings, and commercial facilities along Karachi's Clifton waterfront. The mall has hosted commercial exhibitions, seasonal campaigns, entertainment programs, and fashion-related promotional activities since its opening.

=== Dolmen Mall Tariq Road ===
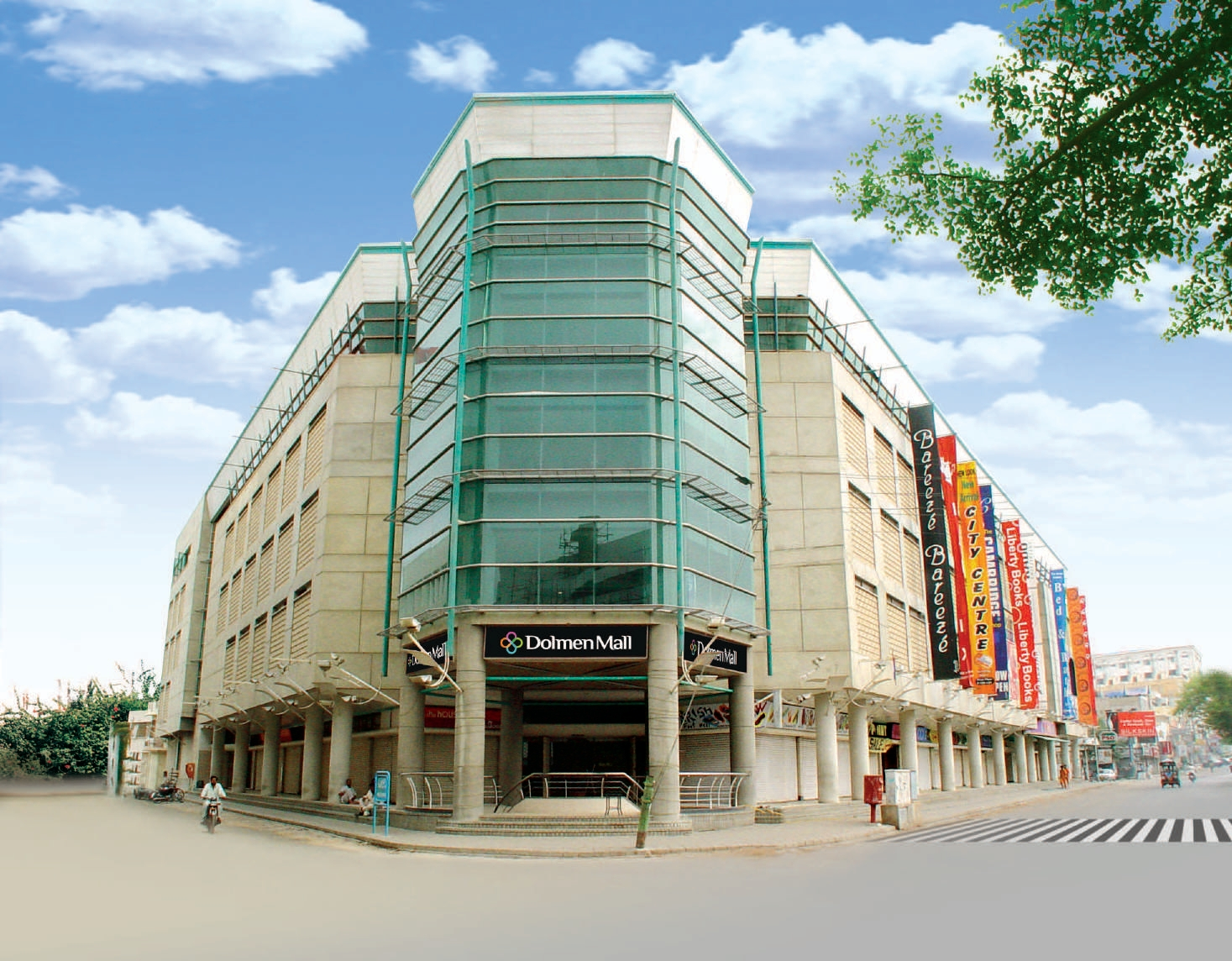
Front facade of Dolmen Mall Tariq Road

Dolmen Mall Tariq Road opened in 2000 along Karachi's Tariq Road commercial corridor. Located on Tariq Road, one of the city's principal commercial districts, the mall contributed to the transition from traditional street-based retail markets toward organized indoor shopping environments in Pakistan.

The mall includes retail outlets, dining facilities, and entertainment spaces.

=== Dolmen Mall Hyderi ===
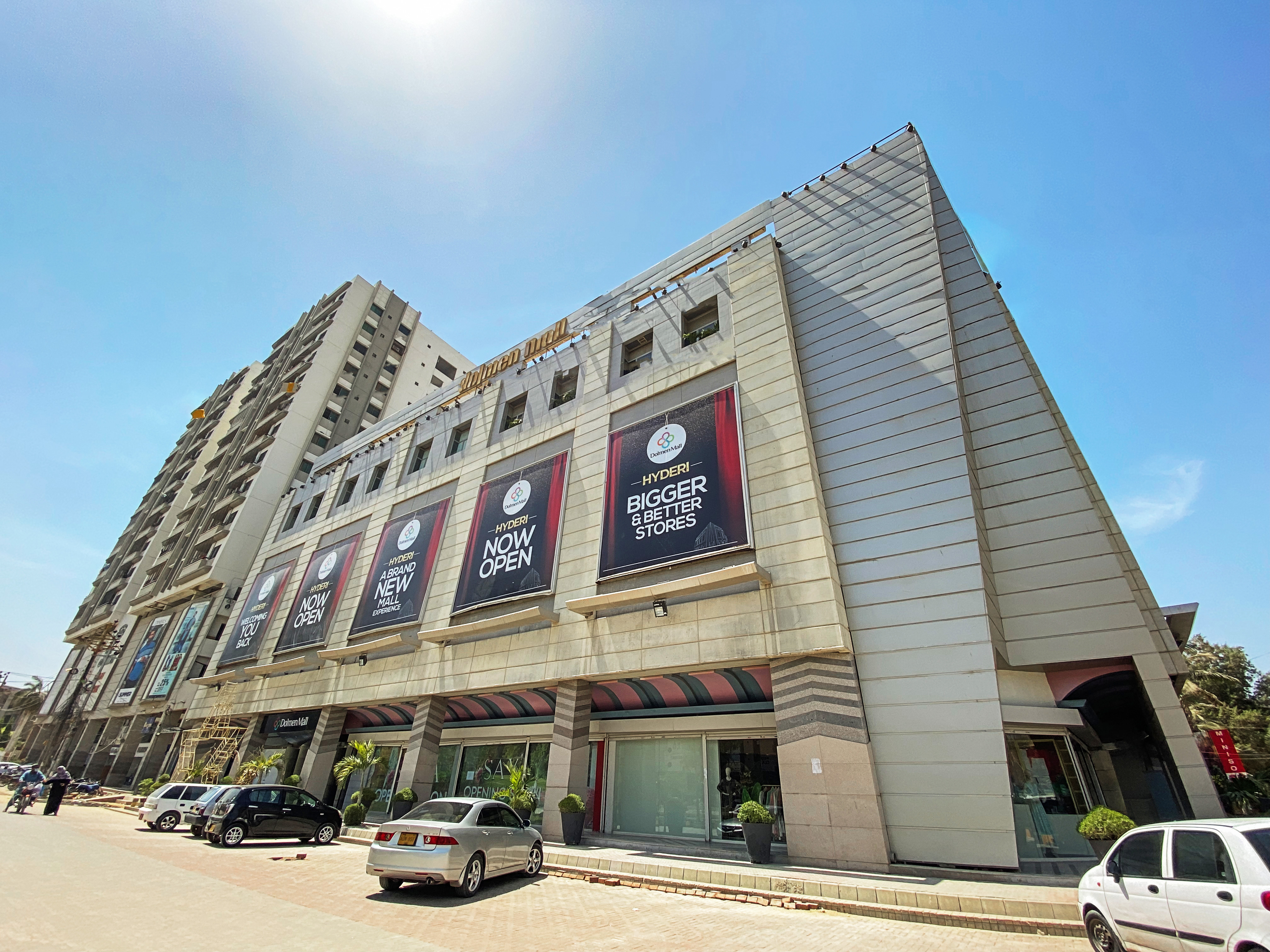
Exterior view of Dolmen Mall Hyderi

Located in Karachi's North Nazimabad area, Dolmen Mall Hyderi serves the surrounding Hyderi commercial district. The mall contains retail outlets, dining facilities, and entertainment spaces catering primarily to surrounding residential neighborhoods and commercial communities.

=== Dolmen Mall Lahore ===
Located in Lahore's Defence Housing Authority area, Dolmen Mall Lahore is the group's first mall development in Punjab. The development integrates shopping, dining, and leisure facilities.

== Architecture and design ==
The architecture of Dolmen Mall Lahore was designed by Chapman Taylor, a United Kingdom-based architecture and urban design practice. According to the firm, the development incorporates design references inspired by ocean waves and South Asian geometric patterns through the use of glazed surfaces, perforated shading systems, and patterned façade elements.

According to Chapman Taylor, the mall incorporates open atrium spaces, food courts, entertainment areas, and extensive glazing as part of its design. According to Chapman Taylor, the design incorporates regional architectural references alongside contemporary retail design principles.

== Significance ==
The developments of Dolmen Mall has been cited in discussions of the growth of organized retail and mixed-use commercial projects in Pakistan. The developments have been cited in discussions of the growth of organized retail and mixed-use commercial projects in Pakistan.

The opening of Dolmen Mall Lahore expanded the group's operations into Punjab.

== Gallery ==
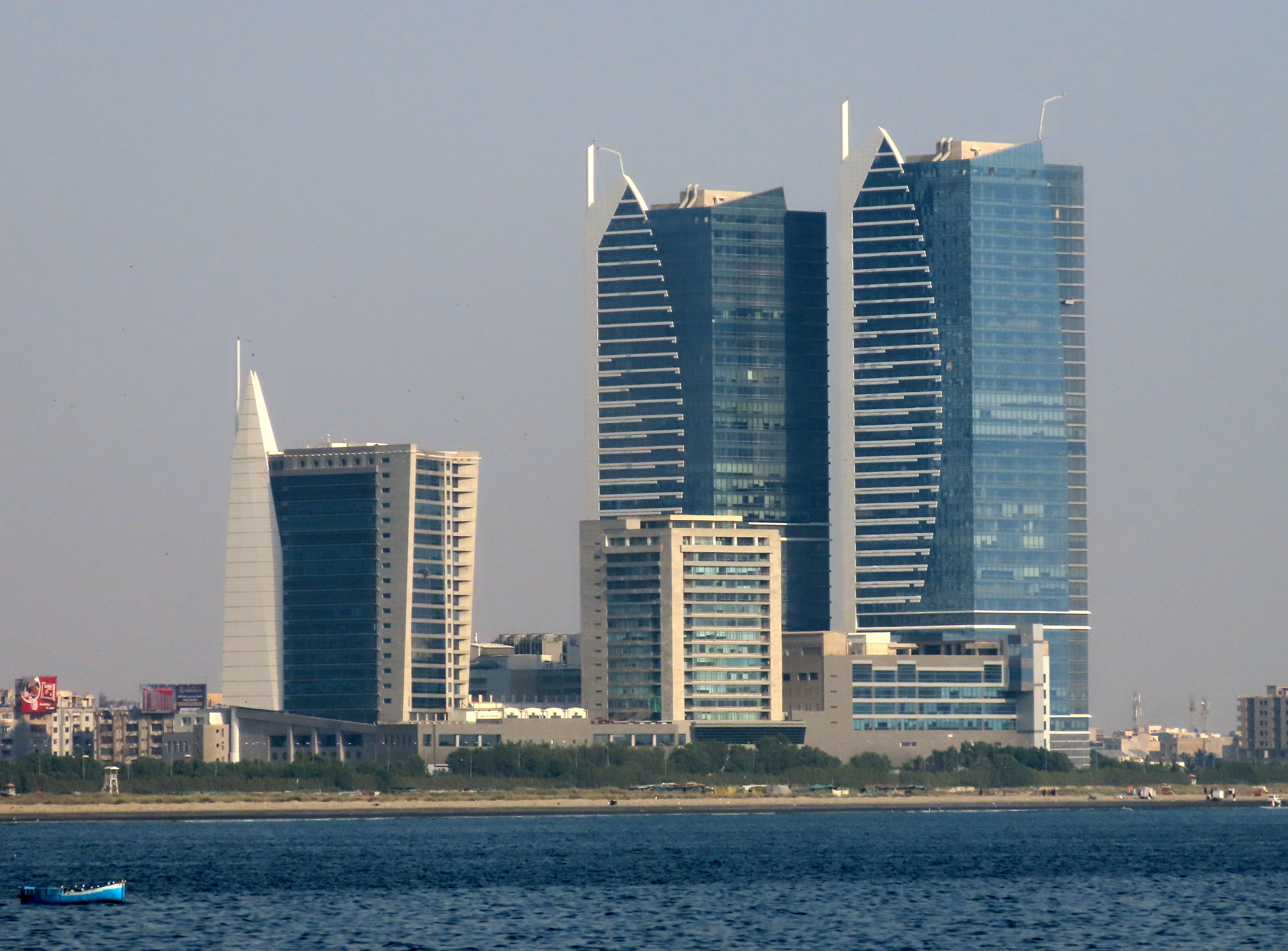
Dolmen City viewed from the Arabian Sea

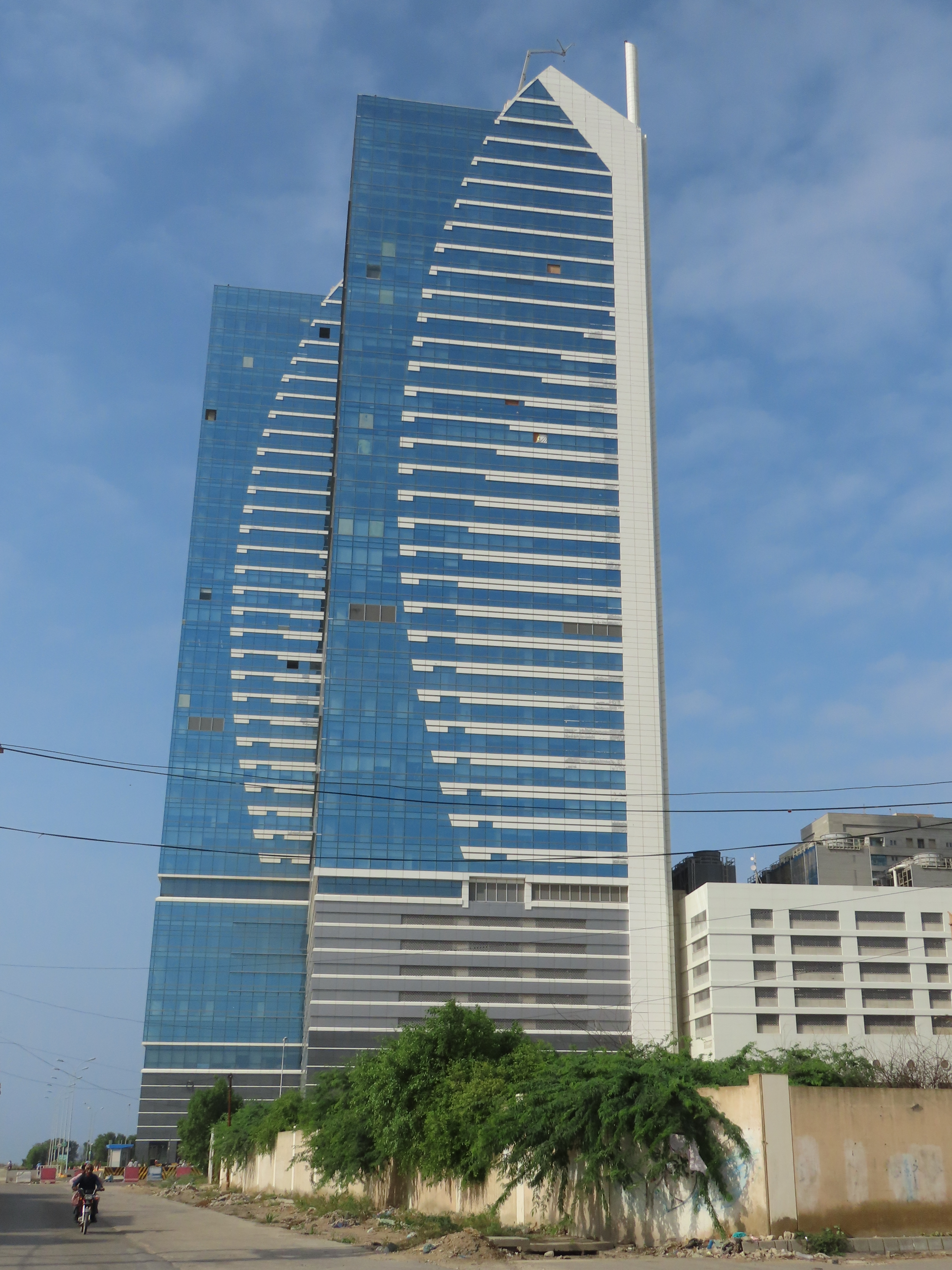
Dolmen Twin Towers in Karachi

== See also ==
- Dolmen City
- List of shopping malls in Pakistan
