= Diplo Tehsil =

Pakistani administrative area

Diplo Tehsil Sindhi: تعلقي ڏيپلو Diplo Taluka
- Tehsil of Tharparkar District

- Location within Sindh Location within Pakistan
- Coordinates: 24°24′0″N 69°29′0″E
- Country: Pakistan
- Province: Sindh
- District: Tharparkar District
- Tehsil: Diplo

Area
  - Tehsil of Tharparkar District: 2,872 km^{2} (1,109 sq mi)
- Elevation: 26 m (85 ft)

Population (2023)
  - Tehsil of Tharparkar District: 163,119
  - Density: 56.8/km^{2} (147/sq mi)
  - Urban: 13,257 (8.13%)
  - Rural: 149,862 (92.82%)

Literacy
  - Literacy rate: Total: (46.10%); Male: (61.15%); Female: (29.89%)
- Time zone: UTC+5 (PST)
- Main languages: 162,754 Sindhi, 174 Pashto, 17 Punjabi

Diplo Tehsil, also referred to as Diplo Taluka, (Note: Sindhi: تعلقو ڏيپلو, pronounced [taʕ.lu.koː deː.ploː], Urdu: تحصیل ڈِپلو, pronounced [tæh.siːl dɪp.loː]) is an administrative subdivision (tehsil/taluka) of Tharparkar District in south-eastern Sindh, Pakistan. Its administrative headquarters are located in the town of Diplo. The tehsil lies about 42 kilometres (26 mi) south-west of the district capital, Mithi, and around 320 kilometres (200 mi) east of Karachi. It occupies the south-western part of Tharparkar District and shares a border with Kutch (Kachchh) District of Gujarat, India.

According to the 2023 national census, Diplo Tehsil had a population of 163,119. The majority of residents speak Sindhi. It is one of the seven tehsils of Tharparkar and is connected by road to neighbouring towns and settlements.

== Geography ==
Diplo Tehsil, situated at an average elevation of 26 metres (85 ft), covers an area of about 2,872 square kilometres (1,109 sq mi), which constitutes roughly 14.6% of Tharparkar District's total area.

It is bordered by Badin Taluka of Badin District to the west and India to the south. Within Tharparkar, it is bounded by Kaloi Taluka to the northwest, Mithi Taluka to the northeast, and Islamkot Taluka to the east.

== Climate ==
Diplo has a hot desert climate (Köppen classification: BWh). Average annual temperatures are around 12 °C (54 °F) to 41 °C (106 °F) and rarely below 9 °C (48 °F) or above 44 °C (111 °F) Rainfall is scarce and highly seasonal, with approximately 0.04 inches (1.0 mm) falling on roughly 20 days per year. precipitation occurs during the June–September monsoon, when ephemeral rivers briefly flow before drying up again during the long arid season.

== Flora ==
Vegetation in Diplo is typical of the Thar Desert, dominated by xerophytic plants adapted to arid conditions. Common species include shrubs such as Prosopis cineraria (locally known as khejri), Capparis decidua (karir), and Salvadora oleoides (jal). Grasses like Cenchrus biflorus and Lasiurus scindicus cover sandy areas and provide seasonal fodder for livestock. Neem trees (Azadirachta indica) are also widely planted, offering shade and greenery in the desert environment. Vegetation cover expands during the monsoon, when rainfall supports temporary cultivation and the rapid growth of wild grasses and herbs across the dunes and plains.

== Fauna ==
A 2015 survey of the Thar Desert recorded 35 species of mammals in the talukas of Tharparkar District. Rodents were the most common, followed by Carnivora, along with insectivores, bats, lagomorph, and several hoofed animals.

== Population ==
The 2023 census recorded 163,119 inhabitants living in 32,219 households. Population density is approximately 56.8 persons per square kilometre. The literacy rate stands at 46.1%, with marked gender disparities: 61.2% for males and only 29.9% for females, reflecting limited educational access, particularly for women and girls.

=== Language ===
Of the 2023 population of 162,968, Sindhi was spoken by about 99.87% of residents (162,754 people). Other languages were spoken by small minorities, including Pashto (0.11%, 174 people), and a few others (0.02%, 40 people) among them Punjabi.

=== Religion ===
Religions in Diplo Tehsil (2023)
Religion	Percent
Islam	53.16%
Hinduism	46.73%
Other or not stated	0.11%

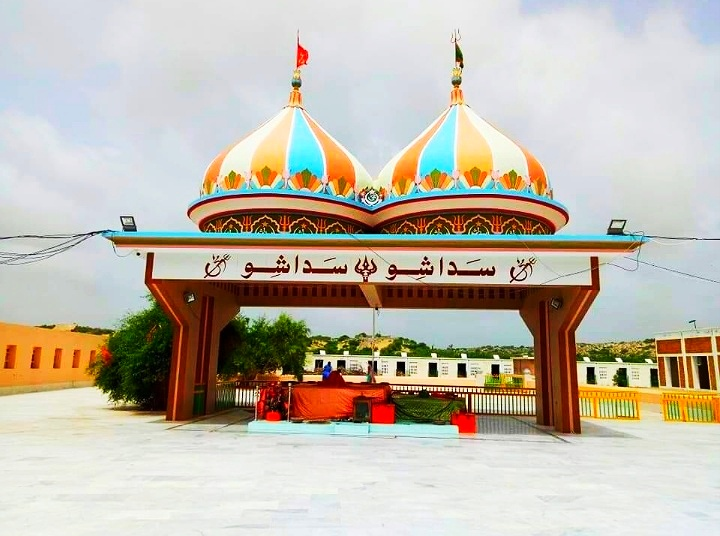
Parbrahm Ashram

Islam is followed by majority of the tehsil's population. Hindus formed a significant minority. The Parbrahm Ashram is one of the major shrine centre in the region.
