= Engro Corporation =

Pakistani conglomerate based in Karachi

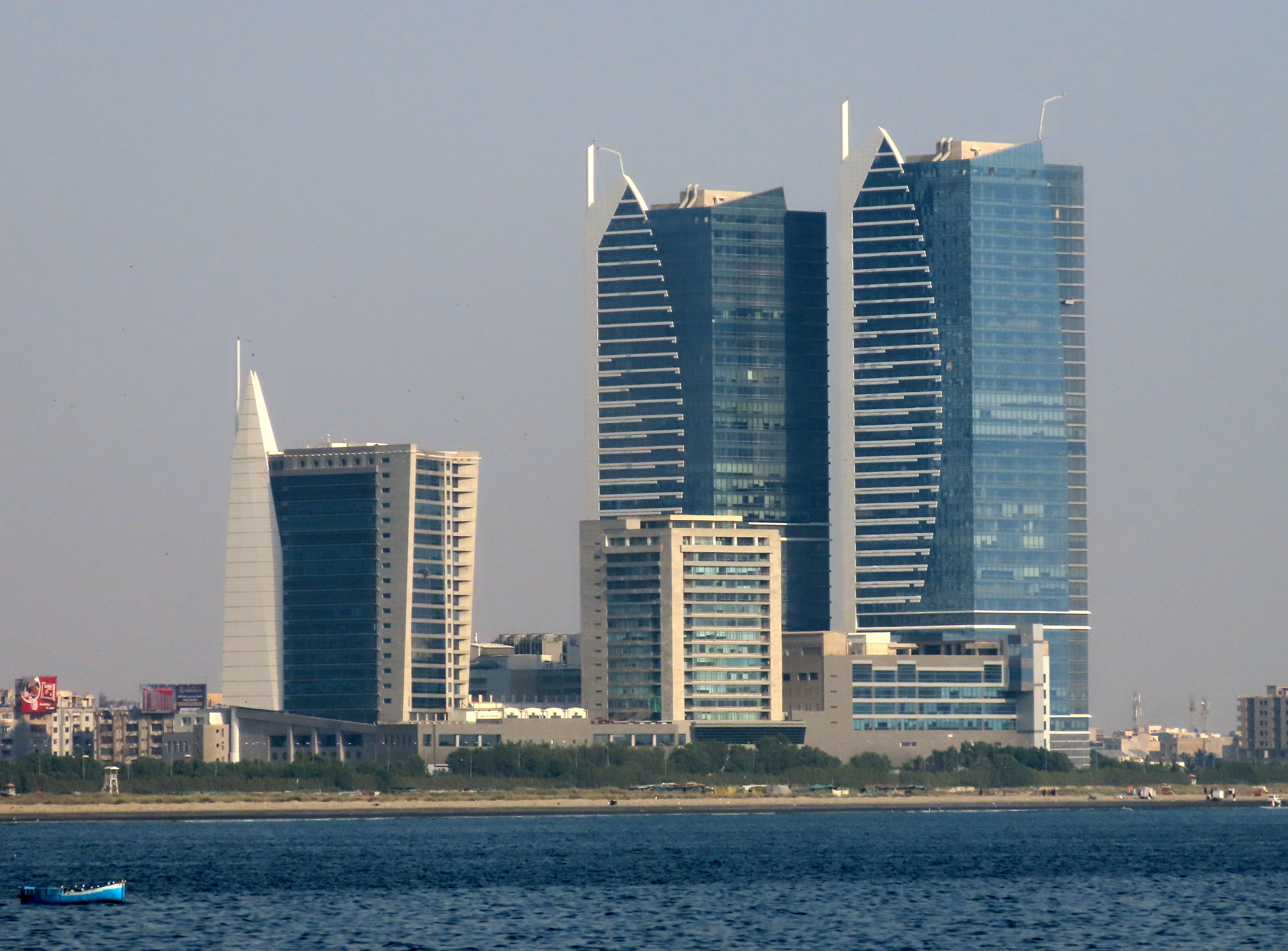
- The Harbour Front Building (smaller, left tower) of Dolmen City, where most Engro companies are headquartered
- Native name: اینگرو کارپوریشن
- Formerly: Esso Pakistan Fertilizer Company Limited (1965–1978); Exxon Chemical Pakistan Limited (1978–1991); Engro Chemicals Pakistan Limited (1991–2010)
- Type: Subsidiary
- Traded as: PSX: ENGRO (1968–2025)
- ISIN: PK0012101017
- Industry: Conglomerate
- Founded: 1965; 61 years ago
- Headquarters: Karachi, Pakistan
- Area served: Pakistan
- Key people: Hussain Dawood (chairman); Ahsan Zafar Syed (CEO)
- Products: Fertilizers, petrochemicals, and dairy
- Services: Telecommunication infrastructure and LNG terminal management
- Revenue: ▲ Rs. 482.488 billion (US$1.7 billion) (2023)
- Operating income: ▲ Rs. 146.410 billion (US$520 million) (2023)
- Total assets: ▲ Rs. 802.4 billion (US$2.9 billion) (2023)
- Total equity: ▲ Rs. 223.1 billion (US$800 million) (2023)
- Owner: Engro Holdings (as of January 2025)
- Number of employees: 3,510 (2023)
- Subsidiaries: Engro Energy; Engro Enfrashare; Engro Elengy; Engro Fertilizers; Engro Polymer; Engro Vopak
- Website: engrocorporation.com
- Footnotes; Financials as of 31 December 2023

Engro Corporation Limited, formerly Engro Chemicals Pakistan Limited, and commonly known as Engro (Urdu pronunciation: [ɛn.ˈɡɾoː] en-GROW), is a Pakistani conglomerate headquartered in Karachi. It was founded as Esso Fertilizer in 1965 by Esso. Its subsidiaries, including Engro Energy, Engro Enfrashare, Engro Elengy Terminal, Engro Eximp FZE, Engro Eximp Agriproducts, Engro Fertilizers, Engro Polymer & Chemicals, and Engro Vopak Terminal, operate in energy, petrochemicals, fertilizers, port terminals, and telecommunications towers.

== History ==
Engro Corporation was originally incorporated as Esso Pakistan Fertilizer Company in 1965 by Esso Standard Eastern to manufacture fertilizer in Pakistan based on the gas reserves it discovered in 1957 near Daharki, Ghotki District, Sindh. Subsequently, it was listed on the Karachi Stock Exchange with the shareholding pattern of 75 percent owned by Esso (US$19 million) and 25 percent by the general public. A urea plant with a production capacity of 173,000 tons was constructed at the cost of US$42 million. The construction of plant began in 1966 and in 1968 it became operational.

In 1978, Esso's parent company was renamed as Exxon and accordingly Esso in Pakistan was renamed as Exxon Chemical Pakistan.

In 1988, Exxon increased its production capacity to 268,000 tons through debottlenecking.

In 1991, Exxon exited Pakistan and its shareholding of 75 percent was acquired by the employees of Exxon Chemical Pakistan in the management buyout. Two years later, in 1993, Engro relocated a second-hand modular ammonia and urea plant to Pakistan which resulted in an increased annual production capacity of 600,000 tons. Later, another debottlenecking project raised the capacity to 750,000 tons per annum.

In 1998, the Engro Conservation and Expansion of Urea (ECES-850) project was implemented which further expanded urea production capacity to 850,000 tons per year.

In 2010, Engro Chemical Pakistan was renamed as Engro Corporation.

In 2015, the National Accountability Bureau (NAB) initiated a case against Engro and several other parties, alleging that the contract for the import and distribution of liquefied natural gas (LNG) awarded to Elengy Terminal in 2013, violated the rules of the Public Procurement Regulatory Authority (PPRA). NAB also accused the then Minister for Petroleum and Natural Resources Shahid Khaqan Abbasi of abusing his authority, which they claimed could result in a potential loss of $2 billion to the national exchequer. Although the case was closed by NAB in 2016, it was reopened in 2018. Engro was exonerated from the case in 2024 and it was declared that "no irregularity, illegal gain or loss to the national exchequer was caused."

Engro was the first Pakistani company to become a signatory of the UN Global Compact (UNGC) and adopt the Global Reporting Initiative (GRI) framework for measuring and reporting corporate performance on economic, social, and environmental parameters.

In January 2025, Engro Corporation was merged into Dawood Hercules, which was renamed Engro Holdings Limited. Subsequently, Engro Corporation became a wholly owned subsidiary of Engro Holdings and was delisted from the Pakistan Stock Exchange as a result.

== Subsidiaries ==
=== Engro Fertilizers ===
Engro Fertilizers is a fertilizer manufacturer in Pakistan. It commissioned EnVen, a single-train urea plant, in 2011.

=== Engro Energy ===
Engro Energy Limited formerly owned Engro Powergen Qadirpur, a 217-megawatt power plant., Engro Powergen Thar, and Sindh Engro Coal Mining Company. It currently owns Engro Energy Services.

=== Engro Polymer ===
Engro Polymer was established as a joint venture with Mitsubishi to produce PVC and other chlor alkali chemicals such as caustic soda, sodium hypochlorite, and hydrochloric acid. Engro has begun production of a plant for and is in the process of spinning off a subsidiary producing peroxide.

=== Engro Elengy ===
Engro Elengy Terminal Limited was founded in 2012 as a subsidiary of Engro Corporation. It was the first LNG terminal of Pakistan that started operations in March 2015.

In July 2018, Royal Vopak acquired 29 percent stake in Engro Elengy for $38 million.

=== Engro Connect ===
Engro Connect, established in 2021, serves as the telecommunications infrastructure arm of Engro. In 2025, it expanded significantly through a Scheme of arrangement that amalgamated Deodar, the telecom tower management subsidiary of Jazz, with approximately 10,500 telecom towers across Pakistan, into Engro Connect.

=== Engro Enfrashare ===
Established in 2018, Engro Enfrashare operates more than 3,950 telecommunication towers in Pakistan and is headquartered in Islamabad. Engro Enfrashare is a wholly owned subsidiary of Engro Connect which, in turn, is a part of Engro.

=== Engro Eximp ===
Engro Eximp Agriproducts was founded in 2011. It operates a plant for processing and finishing rice.

Engro Eximp FZE, a wholly owned subsidiary of Engro Eximp Agriproducts, began its operations in 2022 in the Jebel Ali Free Zone of Dubai.

== Joint ventures ==
=== Engro Vopak ===
Engro Vopak Terminal Limited was originally founded as Engro Paktank Terminal Limited as a joint venture between Royal Vopak and Engro. It was built at a cost of $60 million and was opened in May 1998. It provides storage for bulk liquid chemicals and liquefied petroleum gas (LPG), with a capacity of 82,400 cubic meters.

In 2011, Engro Vopak was fined PKR 10 million for signing a monopolistic contract with Port Qasim Authority.

=== FrieslandCampina Engro Pakistan ===
Established in 2006, FrieslandCampina Engro is a joint venture with Royal FrieslandCampina. Its brands include Tarang, Olpers, Omung, and Omoré.

== Philanthropy ==
Engro's social investment programs are managed by Engro Foundation.

In 2012, Engro Foundation launched I Am The Change Awards to recognize individuals who are working for the betterment of people and hard-hit communities. In 2020, the Foundation also signed a three-year memorandum of cooperation with the Bill and Melinda Gates Foundation to promote the well-being of vulnerable and marginalised segments of society.

== Leadership ==
=== List of chief executive officers ===
- Asad Umar (2004–2012)
- Ali Ansari (2012–2015)
- Khalid Siraj Subhani (2015–2016)
- Ghias Khan (2016–2024)
- Ahsan Zafar Syed (April 2024–present)

=== Board of directors ===
Engro's board of directors includes one executive director, five independent directors, and four non-executive directors. Hussain Dawood has been the Engro Corporation chairman since 2006.
