= Matiari–Lahore transmission line =

HVDC transmission line in Pakistan

660kV High-Voltage Direct Current (HVDC) Matiari–Lahore Transmission Project

Location
- Country: Pakistan
- Province: Sindh, Punjab
- General direction: North-South
- From: Matiari, Sindh
- Passes through: Matiari, Sanghar, Khairpur, Sukkur, and Ghotki districts (Sindh province); Rahim Yar Khan, Bahawalpur, Bahawal Nagar, Pak Pattan, Okara, Kasur, and Nankana districts (Punjab province)
- To: Nankana Sahib District, near Lahore, Punjab

Ownership information
- Owner: Pak Matiari-Lahore Transmission Line Company
- Key people: Zhang Lei (CEO of PMLTLC); Wang Bo (Deputy CEO of PMLTLC)
- Partners: China Electric Power Equipment and Technology; State Grid Corporation of China
- Operator: Pak Matiari-Lahore Transmission Line Company

Construction information
- Contractors: China Electric Power Equipment and Technology; SNC Lavalin; DECON International; King & Wood Mallesons (KWM)
- Construction started: December 2018
- Construction cost: $1.6 billion
- Commissioned: September 1, 2021

Technical information
- Type: Overhead transmission
- Current type: HVDC
- Total length: 878 km (546 mi)
- No. of towers: 1898
- Capacity: 4 GW (4,000 MW)
- DC voltage: ±660 kV
- Website: cpec.gov.pk/project-details/17

The Matiari–Lahore transmission line is an 878 km-long, ±660kV bi-pole high-voltage direct current (HVDC) transmission line running from south to north Pakistan, complete with three repeater stations, two converter stations at Matiari and Lahore, two 40 km electrode lines, and two grounding electrode stations. It starts at Matiari, Sindh and runs to the Nankana Sahib District near Lahore, Punjab. The line is capable of transmitting up to 4 GW (4,000 megawatts) of electricity, which is evacuated from power generating units in the south of Pakistan and transmitted to urban load centers northward in Punjab province.

Constructed under the China–Pakistan Economic Corridor (CPEC) framework by the State Grid Corporation of China (SGCC) and completed on Sept. 1, 2021, the transmission project is the first HVDC line and the first private sector transmission project developed in Pakistan. The $1.6 billion project was developed on a build, own, operate and transfer (BOOT) basis for a 25-year term by the SGCC through a special purpose company named the Pak Matiari-Lahore Transmission Line Company.

== Development ==
=== Planning and negotiations ===
Cost and feasibility studies were conducted by SNC-Lavalin in 2013, who recommended the construction of a 660 kV long-distance transmission line as the most economically and technically viable long-term option. The NTDC and the SGCC signed a cooperation agreement on 20 April 2015 for the development of the line. On 29 December 2016, an investment agreement to build the transmission line was also signed at a signing ceremony at the State Guest House in Beijing, with construction expected to begin in January 2017 and completion of the project expected around August 2018.

The board of directors of the Private Power and Infrastructure Board (PPIB) issued a formal letter of interest (LOI) to the China Electric Power Equipment and Technology Company (CET) for the development of the line on 16 February 2017. The board also cleared the draft implementation agreement (IA) and the transmission services agreement (TSA) for approval via the Economic Coordination Committee (ECC). The PPIB confirmed the issuance of a Letter of Intent (Lol) to CET for the transmission line on 27 March 2017. The Economic Coordination Committee approved the implementation agreement (IA) and transmission services agreement (TSA) on 25 July 2017, which were executed on May 14, 2018.

On 31 March 2017, the former CEO of the Pak Matiari-Lahore Transmission Line Company (PMLTC), Wang Bo, filed an application requesting the grant of a Special Purpose Transmission License to the Pak Matiari-Lahore Transmission Company, with the license subsequently being issued on 19 February 2018 to the company by the National Electric Power Regulatory Authority (NEPRA) of Pakistan. Meanwhile on 4 August 2017, the PPIB issued a Letter of Support (LoS) to the transmission project.

As the guidelines under Transmission Line Policy 2015 require financial close to be reached within 9 months of the issuance of the LoS, the deadline for achieving financial close for the project was 4 May 2018, and NEPRA allowed a construction period of 27 months, making the Commercial Operations Date (COD) 4 August 2020. On 27 April 2018, the ECC extended the financial close date of the project to 1 December 2018, delaying the new COD to March 2021. The PPIB on 11 December 2018 again granted an extension in the LoS for the transmission line as well as a three-month extension to the deadline for achieving financial close with a new financial close deadline of 28 February 2019. The financial close was achieved and signed on 27 February 2019, one day before the revised deadline.

=== Commissioning ===
On 1 September 2021, the Matiari–Lahore transmission line began commercial operations on schedule. On the very first day of operation, the project saved Pakistan from a major grid breakdown by protecting the transmission, dispatch and distribution systems from a possible cascading effect due to tripping at Jamshoro.

== See also ==
- List of power stations in Pakistan
