= Engro Holdings =

Holding company in Pakistan

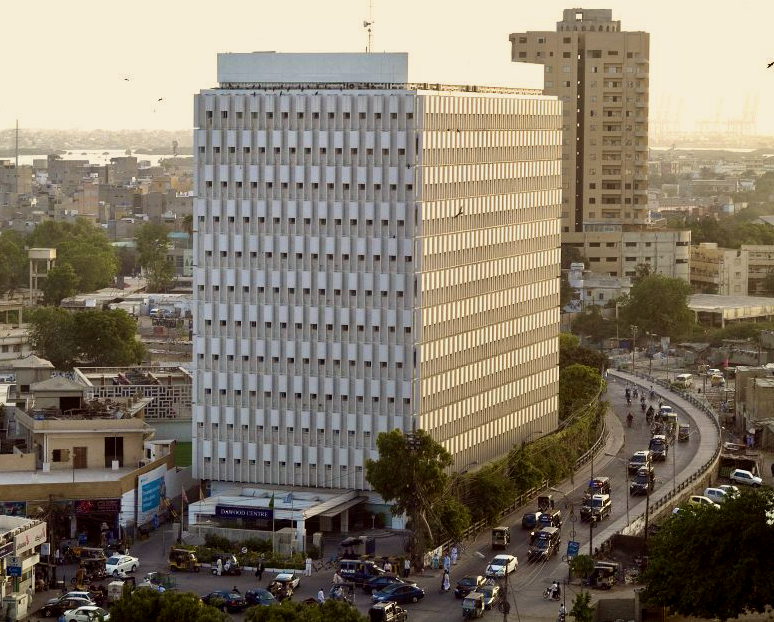
- Headquarters of Dawood Hercules in Karachi
- Formerly: Dawood Hercules Chemicals Limited (1968–2011); Dawood Hercules Corporation Limited (2011–2025)
- Type: Public
- Traded as: PSX: ENGROH; KSE 100 component
- ISIN: PK0017501013
- Industry: Holding company
- Founded: 17 April 1968; 58 years ago
- Founder: Ahmed Dawood
- Headquarters: Dawood Centre, M.T. Khan Road, Karachi
- Area served: Pakistan
- Key people: Hussain Dawood (Chairman); Abdul Samad Dawood (CEO)
- Net income: ▲ Rs. 12.890 billion (US$46 million) (2024)
- Total equity: ▲ Rs. 74.022 billion (US$260 million) (2024)
- Owner: Dawood Lawrencepur (16.19%); Dawood Investments (9.85%)
- Number of employees: 21 (2024)
- Subsidiaries: Engro Corporation
- Website: engro.com
- Footnotes; Financials as of 31 December 2024

Engro Holdings Limited, formerly known as Dawood Hercules Corporation Limited (Urdu pronunciation: [dɑːˈuːd hərˈkjuːliːz] dah-OOD HER-kyoo-leez) is a Pakistani holding company headquartered in Karachi.

== History ==
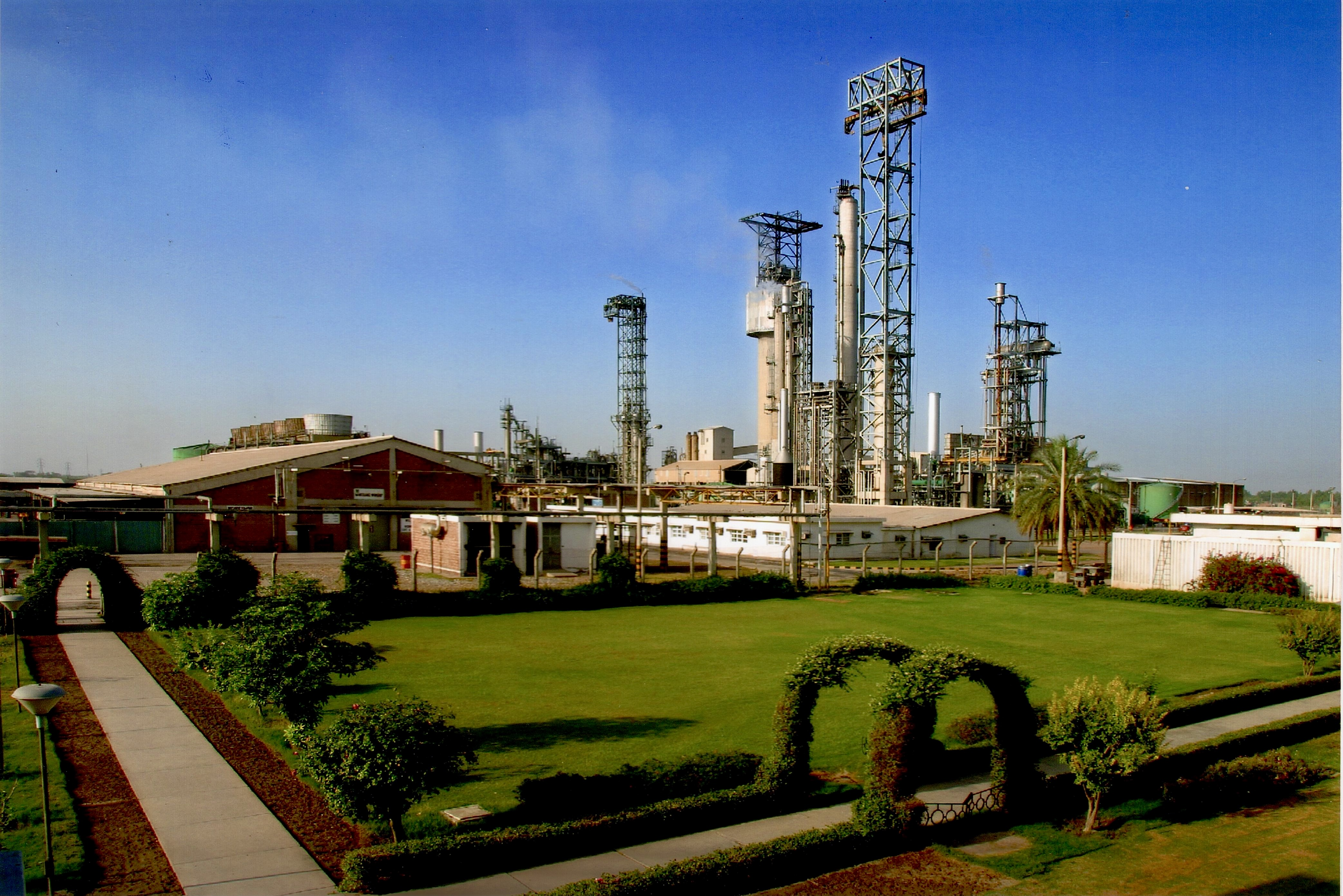
Fertiliser factory in Chichoki Mallian, Sheikhupura district

Engro Holdings was incorporated in 1968 as Dawood Hercules Chemicals Limited, a joint venture between Dawood Group and Hercules Inc., each contributed 40 percent of the equity while 10 percent each was subscribed by the International Finance Corporation and the general public following its initial public offering on the Karachi Stock Exchange. The planning of the project began in 1966 when both the parties requested the World Bank to finance the project. In August 1967, the National Economic Council of Pakistan gave its approval to the project. The fertilizer plant, with a capacity to manufacture 345,000 tons of urea per annum, was constructed in Chichoki Mallian, Sheikhupura, Punjab, at a total cost of $78.2 million; with a loan component of $32 million, provided by the World Bank.

In 1997, Dawood Hercules began equity investments in Engro Corporation, and acquired 27 percent of its shares. In 2002, Dawood Hercules made further investment in the Engro Corporation and since then has increased its shareholding to 40 percent.

In 2003, Dawood Hercules acquired a partial stake in the Sui Northern Gas Pipeline and owned up to 10 percent of its shares.

In 2010, Dawood Hercules Chemicals was de-merged and became Dawood Hercules Corporation. By 2011, Dawood Hercules' fertilizer business was facing difficulties in procuring gas. It undertook a failed sale of DH Fertilizers to Pakarab Fertilizers. In 2012, Dawood Hercules acquired a minor stake in Hub Power Company.

In 2015, Dawood Hercules sold its fertilizer manufacturing company to the Fatima Fertilizer Company. The shares of Hubco were sold in 2018.

In October 2022, Dawood Hercules sold its wholly owned subsidiary Empiric AI, which solves complex industrial problems through software products like data analytics and artificial intelligence, under a share swap agreement to Avanceon.

In January 2025, Dawood Hercules was renamed as Engro Holdings and Engro Corporation became its wholly owned subsidiary company.

== Shareholding ==
Dawood Hercules is majority owned by Dawood family.

== Leadership ==
Dawood Hercules' board of directors, according to Pakistan's Companies Act of 2017, comprises 6 non-executive, 3 independent, and 1 executive director.

Chairman of the board of directors:

- Ahmed Dawood (1968–2002)
- Hussain Dawood (2002–2024)

Vice Chairman of the board of directors:

- J. M. Eagen (1973)
- Gordon M. Hoffmann (1975–1979)
- Walter H. Duncan (1981–1988)
- Arden B. Engebretsen (1989–1990)
- Shahzada Dawood (2018–2023)
- Samad Dawood (2021–2024)

CEOs:

- Mohammad Shamoon Chaudry (2022–2024)

== Engro Connect ==
Engro Connect has acquired all 10,500 telecom towers owned and managed by Jazz in a landmark $560 million deal. This transaction marks the first time a major telecom operator in Pakistan has divested its entire tower infrastructure.

Pakistan currently has around 50,000 telecom towers. The tower company model is gaining popularity globally, allowing multiple telecom operators to share infrastructure and reduce costs. Other tower companies in Pakistan include Engro Enfrashare, Edotco, and Saudi-based TAWAL Pakistan.

== See also ==
- List of largest companies in Pakistan
