= Thar coalfield =

Coal deposit in Sindh, Pakistan

Coordinates: 24°30′N 70°15′E

The Thar coalfield is located in Thar Desert, Tharparkar District, Sindh, Pakistan. It contains the sixteenth-largest coal reserves in the world, discovered in 1991 by the Geological Survey of Pakistan (GSP) in collaboration with the United States Geological Survey (USGS). The discovery was the culmination of a coal exploration and assessment programme carried out under the auspices of the United States Agency for International Development (USAID). This programme began in 1985 and formally concluded in June 1993.

Pakistan is regarded as one of the leading countries in terms of coal resources, with lignite coal from eastern Sindh playing an increasingly important role in the national and provincial economy. The economic deposits are mainly restricted to Paleocene and Eocene rock formations. The Thar coalfield covers more than 9,000 square kilometres and is estimated to contain about 200 billion tonnes of lignite, sufficient to meet Pakistan's fuel requirements for centuries.

The Sindh Engro Coal Mining Company (SECMC) is the principal operator engaged in mining activities at the field.

== Location ==
The Thar coalfield is located approximately between Latitudes 24°15'N and 25°45'N and Longitudes 69° 45'E and 70° 45'E in the southern part of Sindh Province in the Survey of Pakistan topo-sheet Nos. 40 L/2,5 and 6. Based on available infrastructure and favourable geology, the Geological Survey of Pakistan selected four blocks near Islamkot for exploration and assessment of coal resources. The blocks with names, area and coordinates are given in Table-1:

S.No.	Name/blocks	Area	Coordinates	
		(km^{2})	Latitude	Longitude
1	Sinhar Vikian Varvai, Block-I	122.00	24° 35'N to 24° 44'N	70° 12'E to 70° 18'E
2	Singharo Bhitro, Block-II	55.00	24° 44'N to 24° 51'N	70° 15'E to 70° 25'E
3	Saleh Jo Tar, Block – III	99.50	24° 49'N to 24° 58'N	70° 12'E to 70° 18'E
4	Sonalba, Block – IV	82.50	24° 41'N to 24° 48'N	70° 12'E to 70° 20'E
6	Khario Jani, Block – VI	66.10	24° 46'N to 24° 53'N	70° 15'E to 70° 22'E

The area is accessible by a 410-kilometre metalled road from Karachi to Islamkot via Hyderabad-Mirpur Khas-Naukot and Thatta-Badin-Mithi-Islamkot. A road network connecting all the major towns with Thar coalfield have been developed. The rail links from Hyderabad is up to Naukot, which is about 100 kilometres from Islamkot.

== Relief, topography and climate ==
Thar coalfield is a part of the Thar Desert of Pakistan, the ninth-largest desert in the world. It is bounded in the north, east and south by India, in the west by flood plains of the Indus River. The terrain is sandy and rough with sand dunes forming the topography. The relief in the area varies between near sea level to more than 150 metres above sea level.

The climate is essentially that of an arid to semi-arid region with scorching hot summers and relatively cold winters. It is one of the most densely populated deserts of the world with over 91,000 inhabitants. The livelihood of the population depends on agriculture and livestock.

== Water ==
The area is a part of the desert where precipitation is very little with a high rate of evaporation. As such, limited water resources are of great significance.

- Surface water – The water is scant and found in a few small "tarais" and artificially dug depressions where rain water collects. These depressions generally consist of silty clay and caliche material.
- Groundwater – The hydro geological studies and drill hole geology shows the presence of three possible aquifer zones at varying depths: (i) above the coal zone (ii) within the coal zone and (iii) below the coal zone.

Drilling data has indicated three aquifers (water-bearing zones) at an average depth of 50 metres, 120 metres and more than 200 metres:

- One aquifer above the coal zone: Ranges between 52.70 and 93.27 metres' depth.
- Second aquifer with the coal zone at 120 metres' depth: Varying thickness up to 68.74 metres.
- Third aquifer below the coal zone at 200 metres' depth: Varying thickness up to 47 metres.
- Water quality is brackish to saline.

== Geology ==
The Thar coalfield area is covered by dune sand that extends to an average depth of over 80 metres and rests upon a structural platform in the eastern part of the desert. The generalised stratigraphic sequence in the Thar coalfield area is shown in table. It comprises Basement Complex, coal bearing Bara Formation, alluvial deposits and dune sand.

== Coal ==
The coal beds of variable thickness ranging from 0.20–22.81 metres are developed. The maximum number of coal seams found in some of the drill holes is 20. The cumulative thickness of the coal beds range from 0.2 to 36 metres. Claystone invariably forms the roof and the floor rock of the coal beds. The coal is brownish black, black and grayish black in colour. It is poorly to well cleared and compact. The quality of coal is better where percentage of clay is nominal.

== Reserves ==
As a result of widespread drilling over an area of 9,000 km^{2}, a total of 175 billion tons of coal resource potential has been assessed, equivalent to total oil reserves of Saudi Arabia and Iran combined and can be used to produce 100,000 MW for 300 years. Detailed evaluation on four blocks has following results.

S.no.	Name/blocks	Area	Reserves (million tonnes)			
		(km^{2})	Measured	Indicated	Inferred	Total
1	Sinhar Vikian Varvai, Block-I	122.00	620	1,918	1,028	3,566
2	Singharo Bhitro, Block-II	55.00	640	944	-	1,584
3	Saleh Jo Tar, Block – III	99.50	413	1,337	258	2,008
4	Sonalba, Block – IV	82.50	684	1,711	76	2,471
	Total:	358.5	2,357	5,910	1,362	9,629

The overburden consists of three kinds of material: dune sand, alluvium and sedimentary sequence. The total overburden is around 150 to 230 metres. The roof and the floor rocks are claystone and loose sandstone beds.

== See also ==
- Geological Survey of Pakistan
- Saindak Copper Gold Project
- Thar coal railway project
