= Dolmen City =

Office tower complex in Pakistan

- شہر ڈولمین
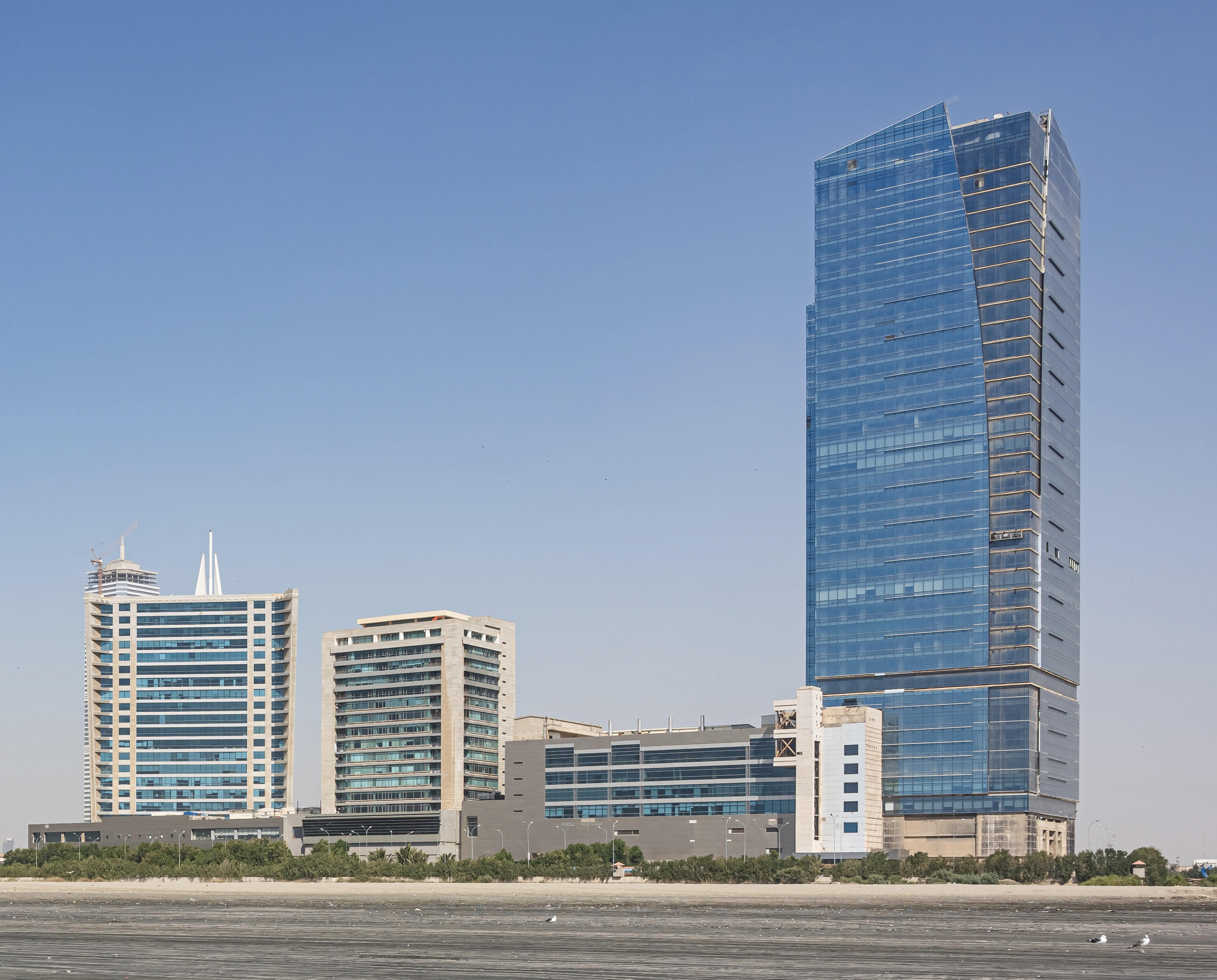
- Dolmen City Towers (Tower B obscured)

General information
- Type: Shopping mall, corporate offices
- Location: Karachi, Pakistan, Marine Promenade - Sea View Road; Clifton, Karachi
- Coordinates: 24°48′07.9″N 67°01′47.7″E
- Construction started: 2005
- Completed: Dolmen Mall - 2011 Harbour Front - 2019 Towers A and B - 2020
- Owner: Dolmen Group

Height
- Roof: 150 m (490 ft) (Towers A and B)

Technical details
- Floor count: 40 (Tower A) 40 (Tower B); 19 (Harbour Front) 17 (Executive Tower)
- Floor area: 319,711 m2 (3,441,340 sq ft)

Design and construction
- Architect: Arshad Shahid Abdulla Pvt. Ltd.

Website
- www.dolmengroup.com

Dolmen City is a mixed-use complex, situated on the waterfront of Clifton, in Karachi, Pakistan. It is made up of four towers: Tower A, Tower B, Harbour Front, and Executive Tower. At the base of the complex is the Dolmen Mall, a three-level shopping mall built in 2011 with an area of 56,000 m^{2} (600,000 sq ft), and 130 stores - including several international brands. The total area of the entire Dolmen City complex is 319,711 m^{2} (3,441,340 sq ft).

== History ==
Dolmen City's site was originally the site of a casino complex, which was closed in 1978 during the reign of General Zia-ul-Haq before it was formally opened. The site was purchased for 100 million rupees, but the value of the listed portion of that property was in excess of 50 billion rupees in 2019. The complex was owned by the International Complex Project - a venture which was 20% owned by the Arif Habib Group, and 80% by the Dolmen Group. Since June 2015, the companies have listed some of their shares as part of the Dolmen City REIT on the Pakistan Stock Exchange.

Construction of the Dolmen City complex began in 2005, and was completed in phases. The site's branch of Dolmen Mall was completed in 2011, while the Harbour Front Tower and Executive Towers were completed in 2019.

== Office towers ==
Towers A and B are 150 m (490 ft) in height, 40 floors each, and are made of concrete. They were designed by architect Arshad Shahid Abdulla. Both house corporate offices.

Executive Tower is a 17-floor corporate office building, and is home to co-working space company Regus. Harbour Front is an office building with 19 floors, and houses some multinational corporations such as Mitsubishi and Procter & Gamble. The occupancy rate in Harbour Front is 92% as of Q1 2020.

== Dolmen Mall ==
Dolmen Mall is a 3-level shopping mall built in 2011 with an area of 56,000 m^{2} (600,000 sq ft), of which 50,903.8 m^{2} (547,924 sq ft) are leasable. It has 130 stores, including several international brands. There are several Pakistani chains as well, including Khaadi. Aldo, Nike & Adidas. The occupancy rate of the mall is 98.3% as of Q1 2020.

== Dolmen City REIT ==
The occupancy rate for Dolmen Mall stood at 98.3 percent in 2020, while those of the Harbour Front Building stood at 92 percent in 2020.

== Gallery ==
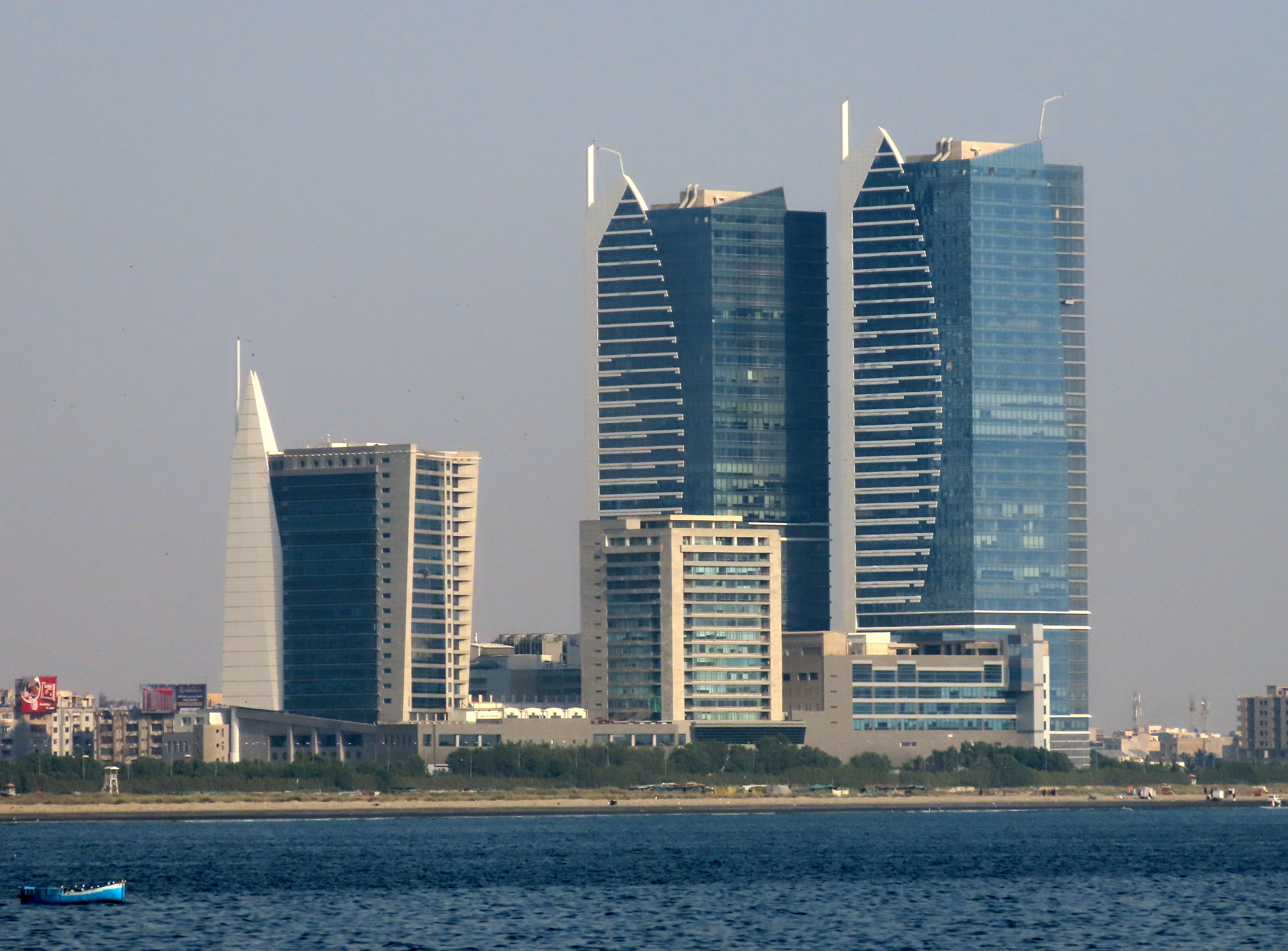
Dolmen seen from the sea

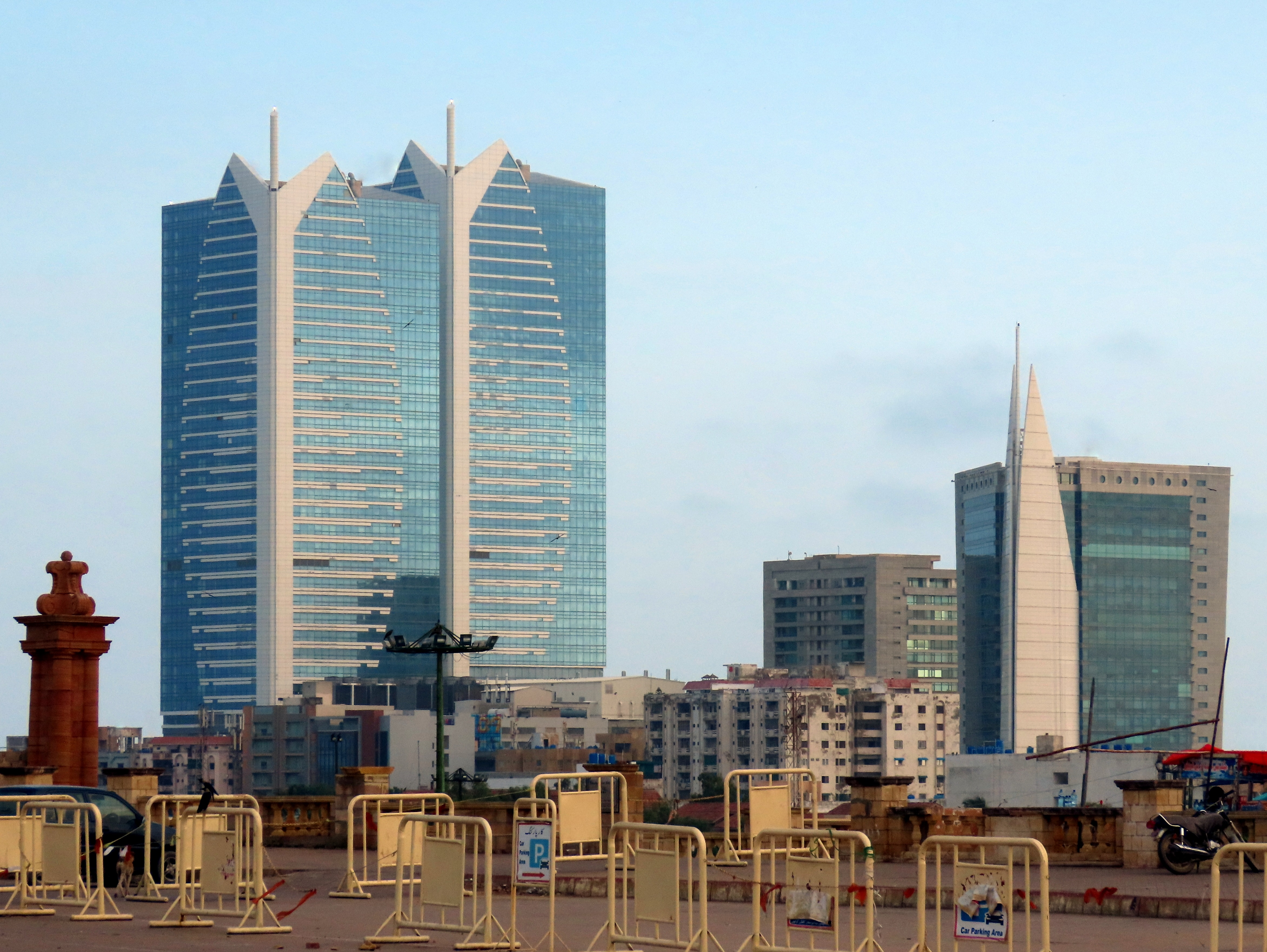
Dolmen City as seen from Bin Qasim Park

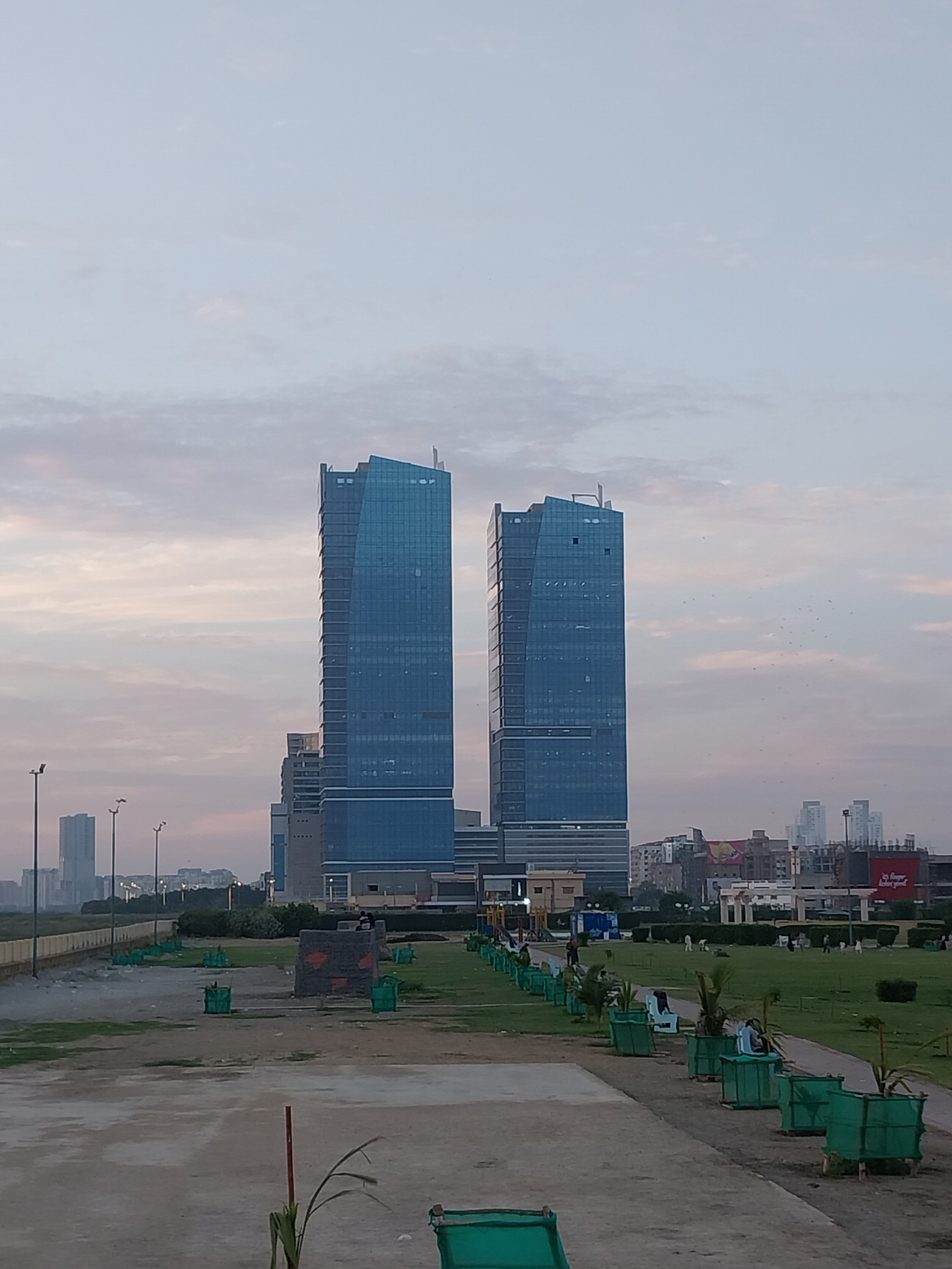
Dolmen Twin Towers

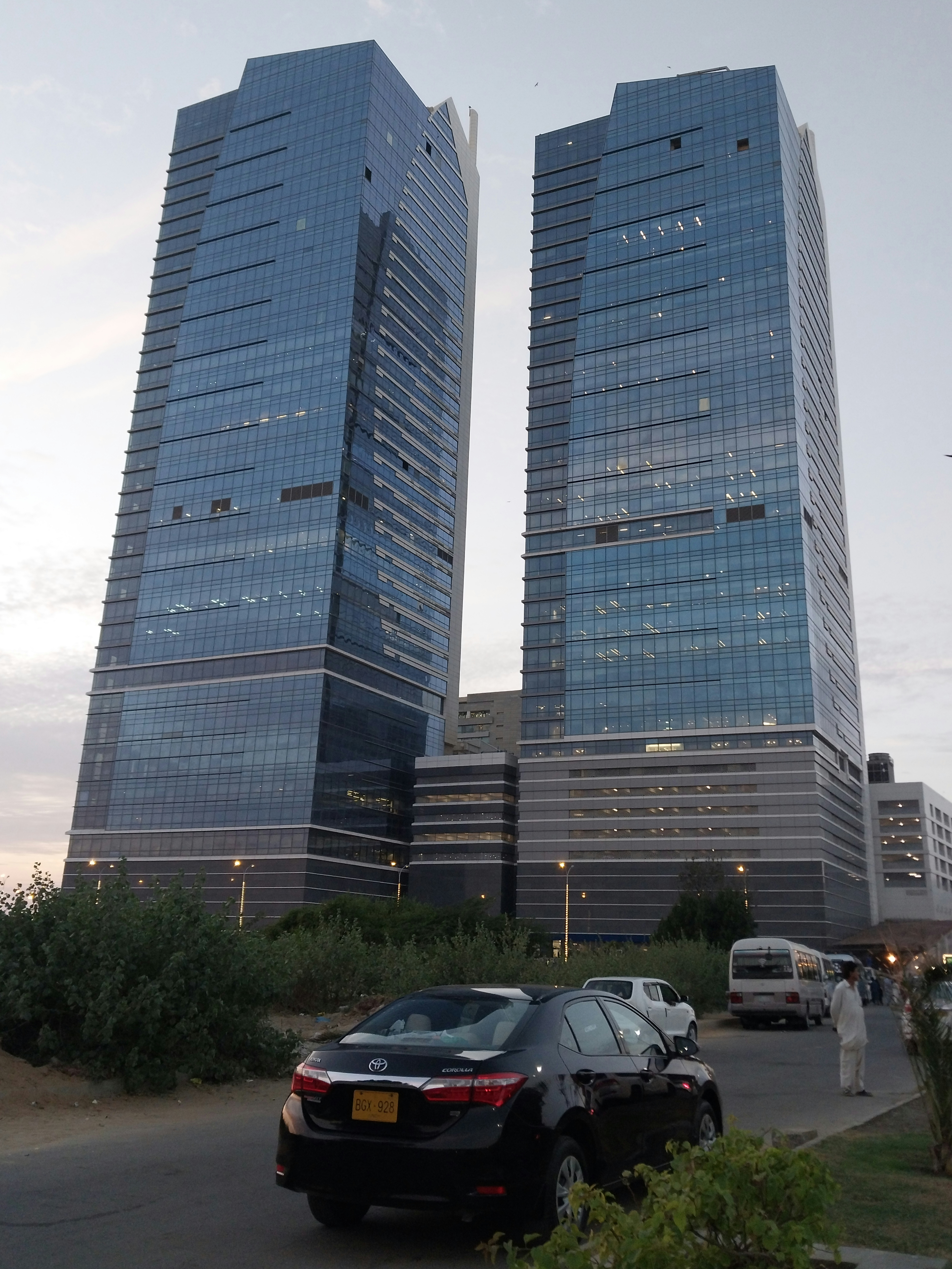
Dolmen Twin Towers

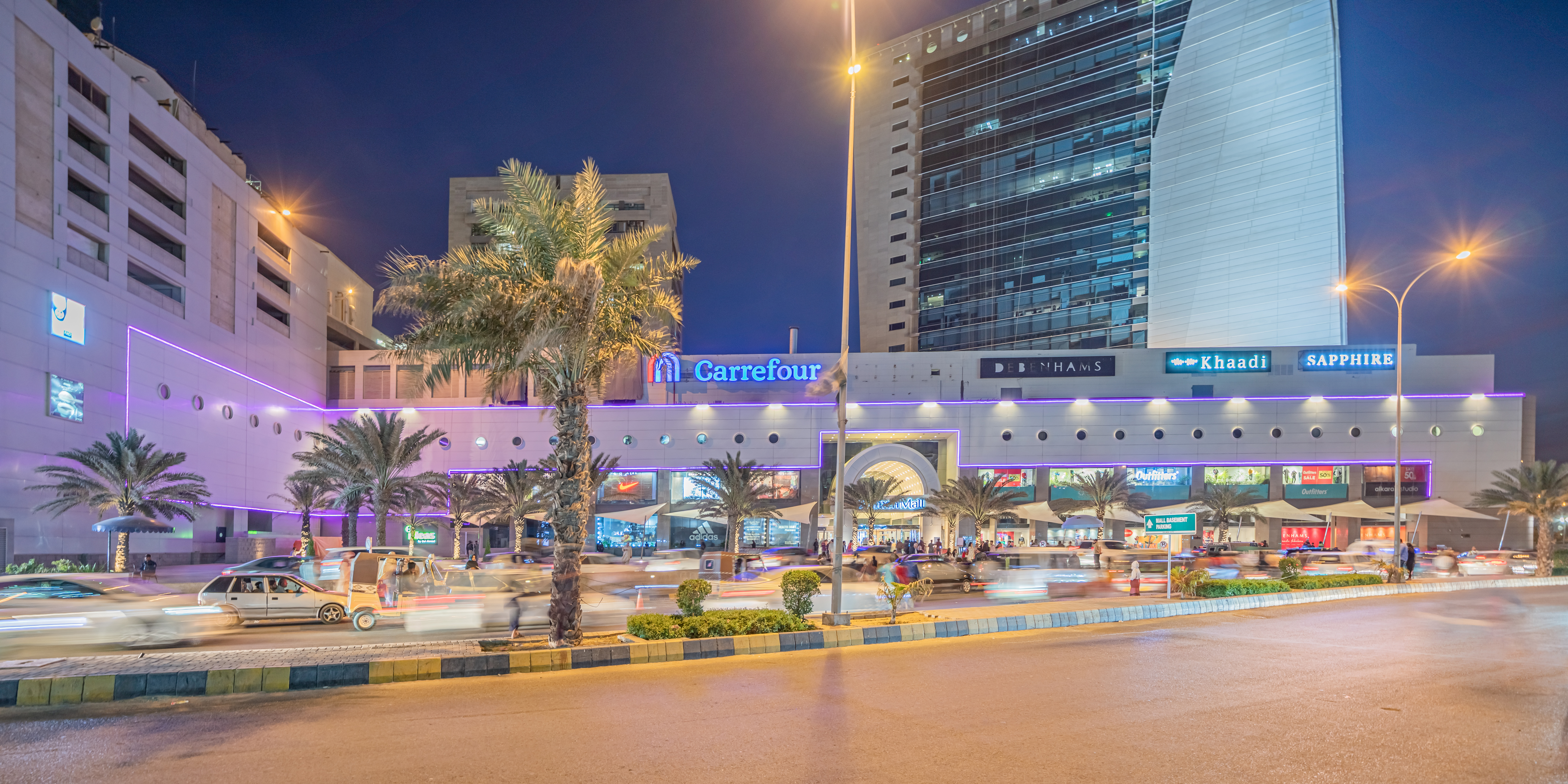
Dolmen Mall at Dolmen City

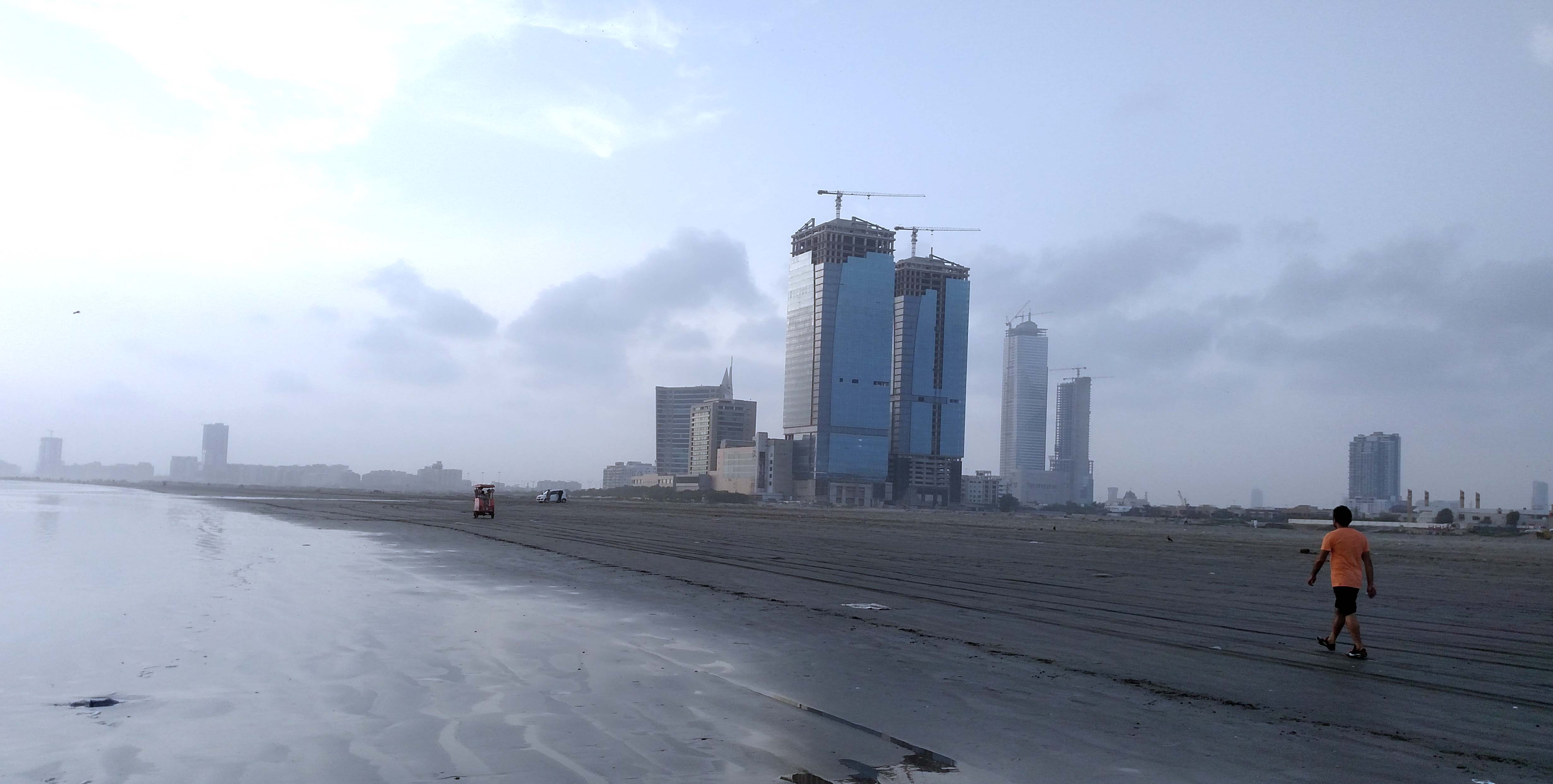
Dolmen City pictured in 2019 under construction, with the under-construction Bahria Icon Tower visible to the right

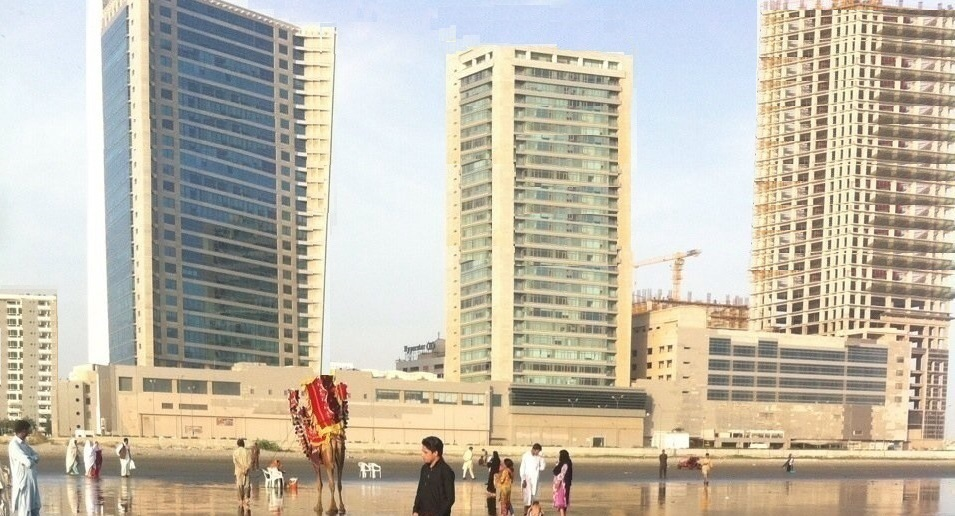
Harbour Front tower on the left, with the Executive Tower on the right.

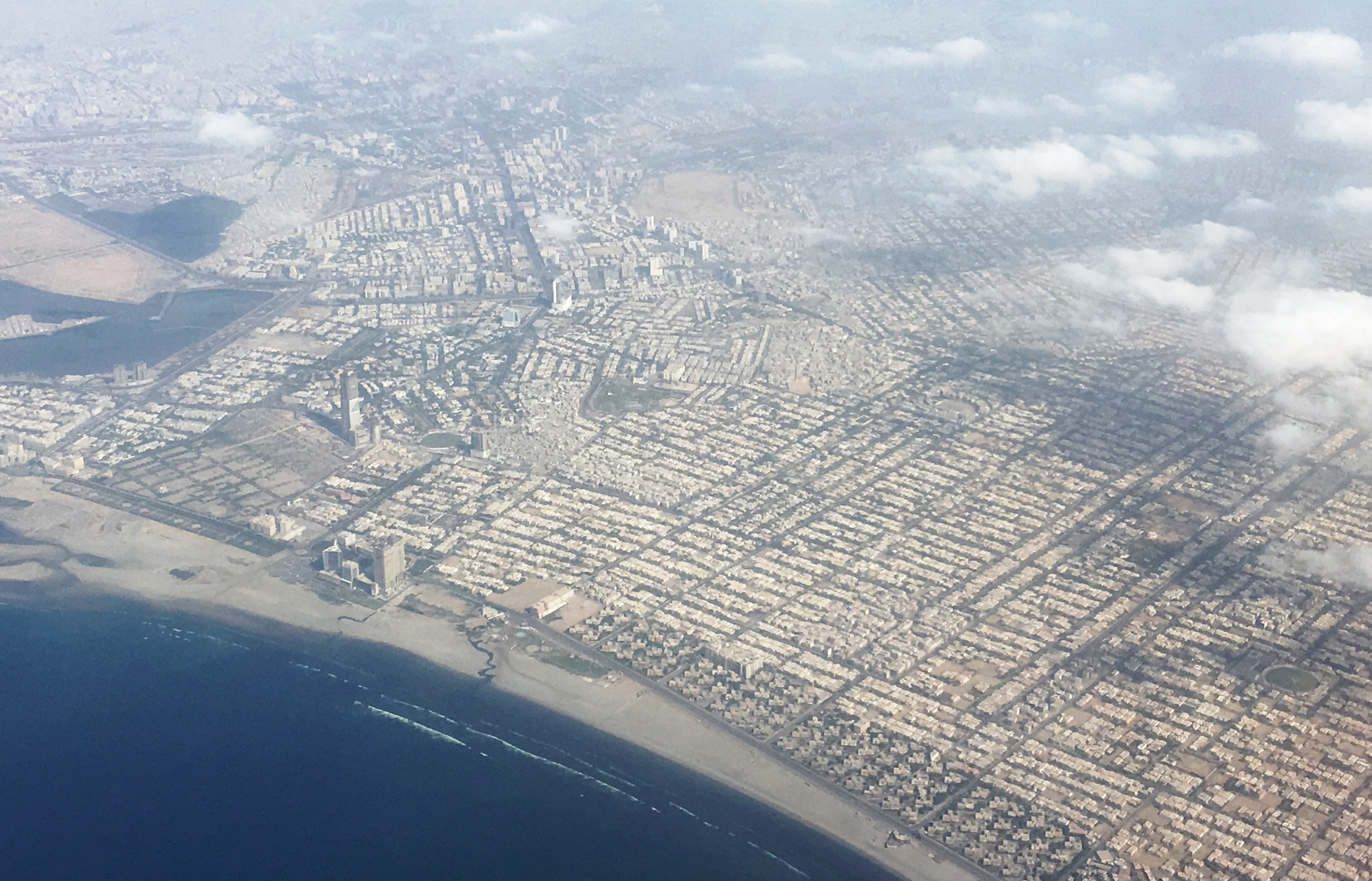
Aerial view of Clifton, with Dolmen City visible along the coast near the Bagh Ibne Qasim park

== See also ==
- List of tallest buildings in Pakistan
- List of tallest buildings in Karachi
