= Sant Nenuram Ashram =

- سنت نینورام آشرم
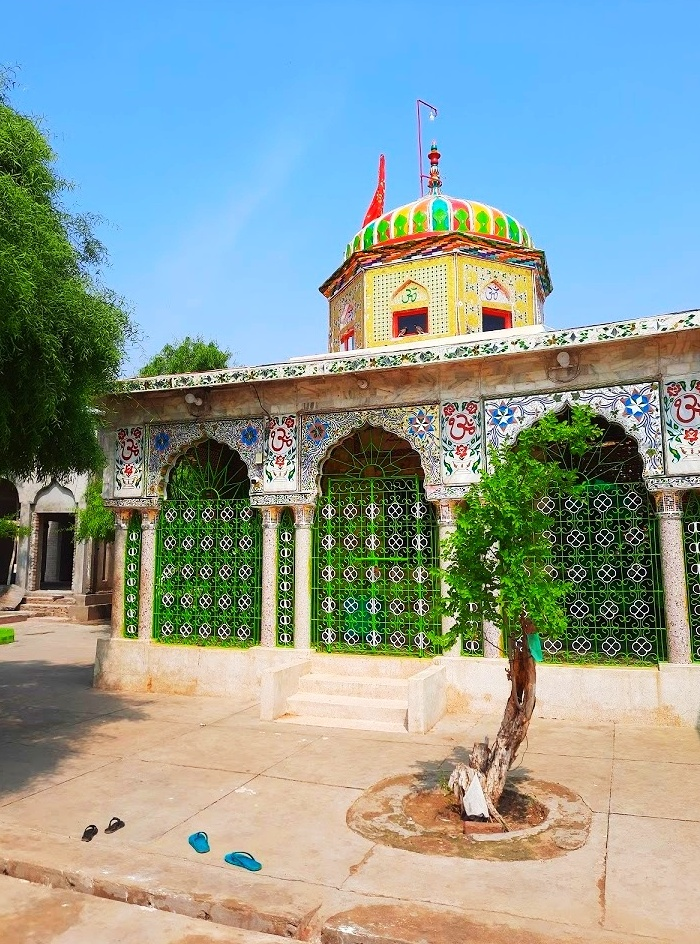
- Sant Nenuram Ashram

- Location within Sindh

Religion
- Affiliation: Hinduism
- District: Tharparkar
- Deity: Sant Nenuram, Hanuman etc
- Festivals: Sant Nenuram Mela, Diwali

Location
- Location: Islamkot
- State: Sindh
- Country: Pakistan
- Coordinates: 24°41′47.7″N 70°10′30.2″E

Website
- http://santnenuram.org/

Sant Nenuram Ashram is an Ashram located in Islamkot city in the Tharparkar District in the Sindh province of Pakistan. It is one of the most revered temples of the Hindu community in Pakistan. It is 45 km away from the district capital Mithi. The ashram is spread over a 10-acre land containing temples and resting places.

The ashram was established by the Hindu saint Sant Nenuram. The Ashram provides food to hundreds of people every day irrespective of their religion and caste. The Sant Nenuram Mela – a three-day festival commemorating the death anniversary of Sant Nenuram – is visited by a large number of Hindus and Muslims.

== Description ==
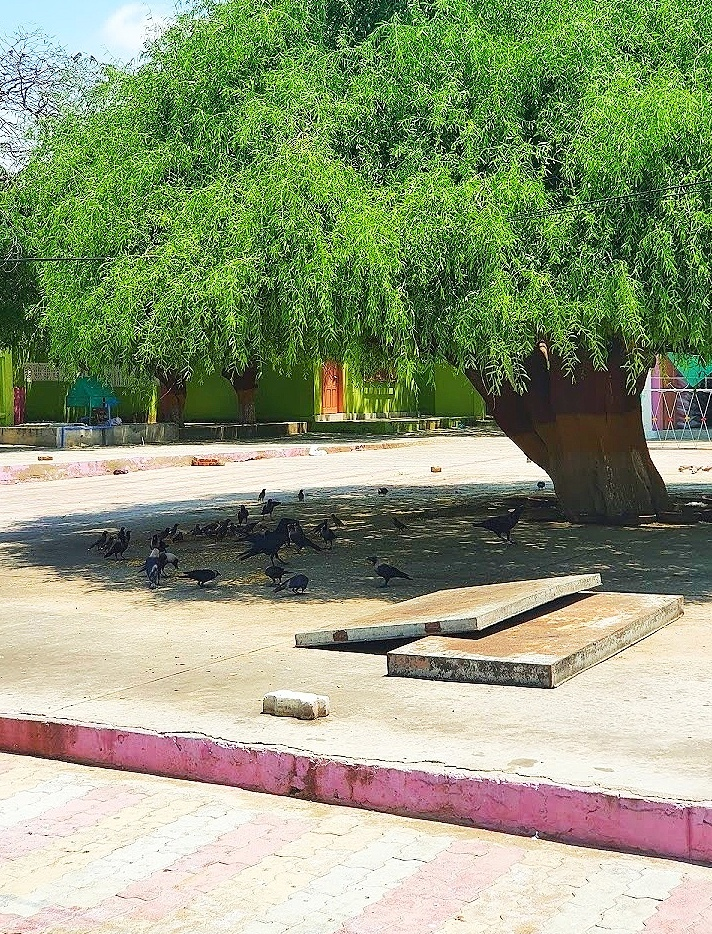
Birds under a tree eat food left by devotees at the Ashram

Sant Neenu Ram was born in 1898 in the Islamkot. He was very inspired by the teachings of Hindu saint Poorun Bharti whose shrine is 7 km away from Islamkot. He spent years at that shrine and then came back to his Islamkot in 1937 to spread the teachings of Pooran Bharti and built the ashram, then called Sami Purn Ashram. He built a community kitchen in ashram to serve food for everyone irrespective of their caste and religion. To feed the visitors to the ashram, he used to go from house to house to collect food. Today many devotees coming to the ashram bring food items for preparing food. Devotees also bring food for animals and birds residing in the ashram.

== Gallery ==
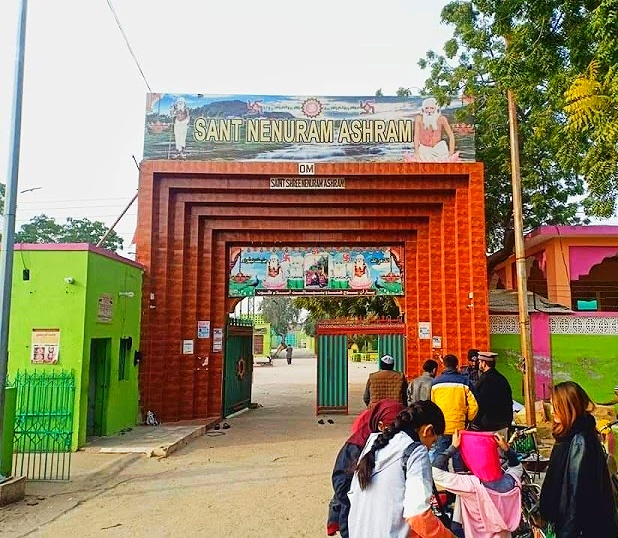
Entrance to Sant Nenuram ashram

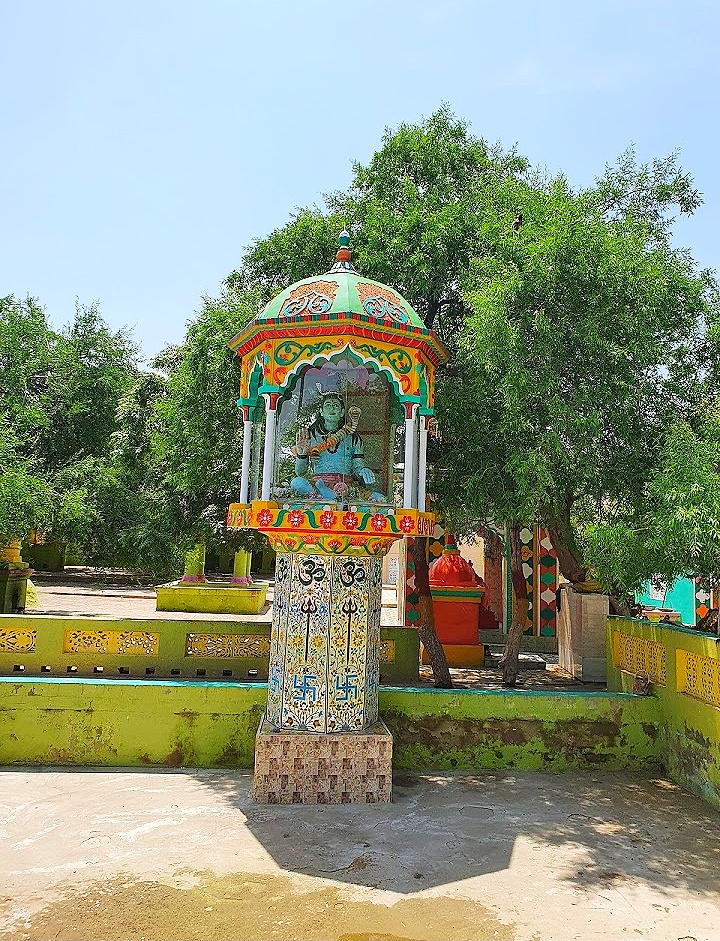
Shiva statue in Sant Nenuram ashram

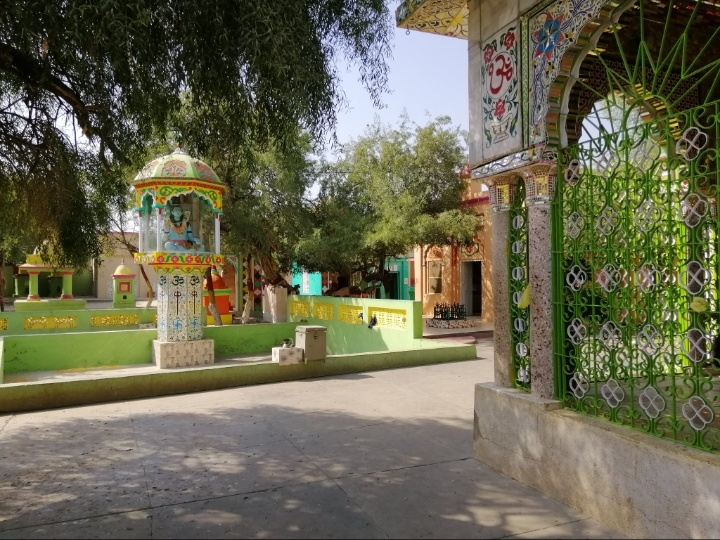
Inside the ashram

== See also ==
- Parbrahm Ashram
- Ramapir Temple Tando Allahyar
- Churrio Jabal Durga Mata Temple
- Umarkot Shiv Mandir
- Hinduism in Pakistan
