= Sindh Engro Coal Mining Company =

Pakistani Mining Company

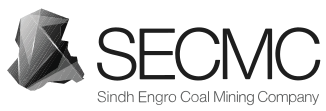
- Company type: Unlisted public company
- Industry: Coal
- Founded: 2009; 17 years ago
- Headquarters: Karachi, Pakistan
- Area served: Sindh
- Key people: Amir Iqbal (CEO)
- Revenue: ▲ Rs. 109.407 billion (US$390 million) (2023)
- Net income: ▲ Rs. 29.160 billion (US$100 million) (2023)
- Total assets: ▲ Rs. 232.904 billion (US$830 million) (2023)
- Total equity: ▲ Rs. 81.490 billion (US$290 million) (2023)
- Owners: Government of Sindh (54.70%); Thal Limited (11.90%); Liberty Textile (11.90%); Hubco (8%); Habib Bank Limited (9.5%); Huolinhe Open Pit Coal Investment (8.5%); CMEC Thar Mining Investments (4%)
- Parent: Government of Sindh
- Website: secmc.com.pk
- Footnotes / references Financials as of 31 December 2023

Sindh Engro Coal Mining Company (SECMC) is an unlisted Pakistani coal mining company headquartered in Karachi.

It was established in 2009 as a public-private partnership between the Government of Sindh and Engro Powergen, a subsidiary of Engro Corporation, for the development of coal mining and power generation projects in Block II of the Thar coalfield in Tharparkar. The Government of Sindh holds a majority stake of just over 51 percent, while other private sector partners collectively hold the remaining 49 percent.

== Projects ==
SECMC projects include's under construction 660MW of power plant when completed in 2017. Its flagship project is based on 75:25 debt to equity ratio. The company raised $900 million from Chinese banks, $300 million from a Pakistani banking consortium and the remaining $400 million from sponsors. SECMC is establishing another 600MV plant in partnership with State Power Investment Corporation.

It would in total produce 3,960MW of electricity, in six phases, from the coal in Block II of the project. The first phase of 660MW would be completed within three and a half years, while a new unit of 660MW each would be added subsequently. A sum of $1.6 billion with $800 million component for the open pit mining and $800 million for the power plant have been invested in the project.
