= Mithi =

Mithi مٺي (Sindhi) مِٹّھی (Urdu)
- City
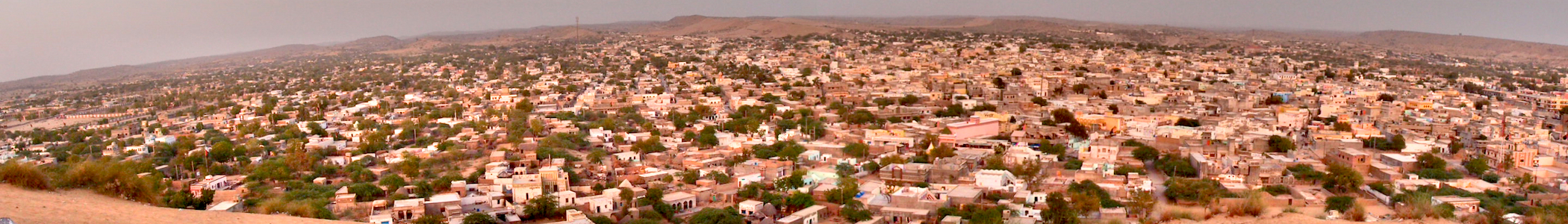

- Location within Sindh Location within Pakistan
- Coordinates: 24°44′24″N 69°48′0″E
- Country: Pakistan
- Province: Sindh
- Division: Mirpur Khas
- District: Tharparkar

Government
  - Assistant Commissioner: Dr. Umair Ashraf

Area
  - Metro: 2,954 km^{2} (1,141 sq mi)
- Elevation: 42 m (138 ft)

Population (2023)
  - City: 52,376
  - Metro: 239,091 (Mithi tehsil)
  - Metro density: 80.94/km^{2} (209.6/sq mi)
- Time zone: UTC+5 (PST)
- Calling code: 0232-261xxx

Mithi (Sindhi: مِٺي; Urdu: مِٹّھی, Urdu pronunciation: [mɪʈ.ʈɦiː]) is a city and the administrative capital of Tharparkar District in the Sindh province of Pakistan. It became the district headquarter of Tharparkar District in 1990, after the area's separation from Mirpur Khas. Mithi is one of the very few cities in Pakistan where Hindus form a majority. Roughly 70% of Mithi's population belongs to the Hindu community.

== Geography ==
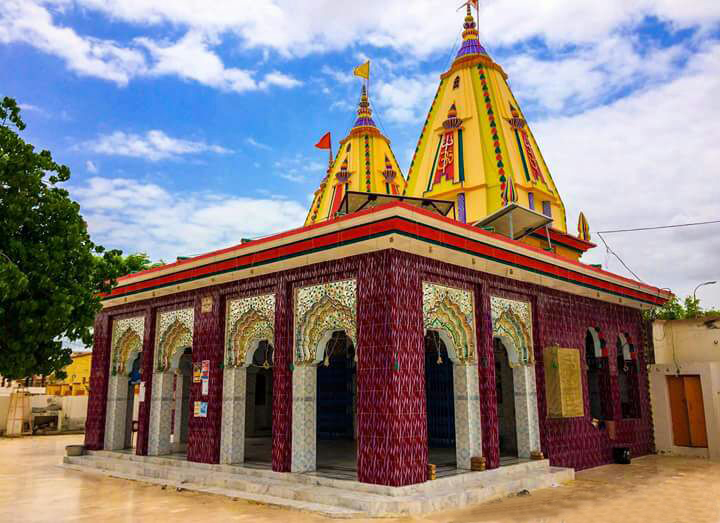
Shiv Parvati Temple, Mithi

The town is located at 24°44′24″N 69°48′0″E with an altitude of 28 meters (92 feet). It lies at 278 kilometers east of Karachi and is located in a deserted area. The geography of Mithi is characterized by its arid landscape, typical of the Thar Desert, which influences the climate, agriculture and daily life in the town. Water scarcity is a significant issue due to the desert terrain. The region is known for its unique flora and fauna adapted to the harsh desert conditions, as well as for the traditional mud-brick architecture found in the town.

== Economy ==
Mithi is now considered the heart of Tharparkar District with a high level of economic and social activity. It has seen a large increase in development. Significant numbers of people from all over the Tharparkar District have moved to the city.

According to the Thar Coal Mining Authority, preparations have been completed for them to start work on the open pit coal mine, which covers over 9,600 square km of Tharparkar District. 175 billion tonnes of coal, the world's 5th largest reserves of coal, are estimated to be available. The project has received financial assistance from China as part of the China-Pakistan Economic Corridor (CPEC). Almost 3,000 Chinese technicians and engineers are expected to arrive on site to help locals in running the heavy machinery. Roads, preliminary infrastructure and residential complexes for labourers are under construction.

== Education ==
- University of Thar (Purposed Campus)
- Thar Institute of Engineering, Science, and Technology, Tharparkar
- Cadet College Mithi
- Marvi Technical & Vocational Training Institute Mithi
- Government Polytechnic Institute Mithi
- Sadiq Faqir Government Degree College Mithi
- Government Girls Degree College Mithi
- Government Elementary College of Education Mithi
- Amar Jagdish Malani Government High School North Colony Mithi
- Government (prov) High School Mithi
- Government Girls High School Mithi

== Demographics ==
Population

Historical population
Year	Pop.	±%
1972	10,211	—
1981	12,287	+20.3%
1998	19,697	+60.3%
2017	47,135	+139.3%
2023	52,376	+11.1%

The population of Mithi city in 1998 was 19,697 but according to the 2023 Census of Pakistan, the population has risen to 52,376. The population of Mithi tehsil was 239,091 (2023).

=== Languages ===
Mithi's primary local language is Sindhi and the dialect of Sindhi spoken here is Dhatki, one of the Indo-Aryan branch of the Indo-European language family. It is most closely related to Sindhi and Marwari. Sindhi is also used as medium of communication understood by the local populace.

=== Religion ===
Religions of Mithi Taluka (2023 Census)
1. Hinduism 167,048 (69.9%)
2. Islam 71,676 (30.0%)
3. Others 367 (0.15%)

Majority of the population in both Mithi city and the taluka are home to the Hindu community, and is one of the few areas of Pakistan where Muslims are in minority of roughly 30% only.

== See also ==
- Sant Nenuram Ashram
