= NA-213 Umerkot =

Constituency of the National Assembly of Pakistan

- Constituency for the National Assembly of Pakistan
- Region: Umerkot District
- Electorate: 608,997

Current constituency
- Member(s): Vacant
- Created from: NA-228 Mirpur Khas-III

NA-213 Umerkot (این اے-213، عُمرکوٹ) is a constituency for the National Assembly of Pakistan.

== Assembly Segments ==
Constituency number	Constituency	District	Current MPA	Party
49	PS-49 Umerkot-I	Umerkot District	Syed Sardar Ali Shah	PPP
50	PS-50 Umerkot-II	Umerkot District	Syed Ameer Ali Shah	PPP
51	PS-51 Umerkot-III	Umerkot District	Nawab Muhammad Taimur Talpur	PPP

== Members of Parliament ==
=== 2002-2018: NA-228 Mirpurkhas-III ===
Election	Member	Party
2002	Nawab Yousuf Talpur	PPPP
2008	Nawab Yousuf Talpur	PPPP
2013	Nawab Yousuf Talpur	PPPP

=== 2018–2023: NA-220 Umerkot ===
Election	Member	Party
2018	Nawab Yousuf Talpur	PPPP

=== 2024–2025: NA-213 Umerkot ===
Election	Member	Party
2024	Nawab Yousuf Talpur	PPPP

== Election 2002 ==
General elections were held on 10 October 2002. Nawab Muhammad Yousuf Talpur of PPP won by 58,161 votes.

General election 2002: NA-228 Mirpurkhas-III
Party	Candidate	Votes	%	±%
PPP	Nawab Yousuf Talpur	58,161	52.28	
NA	Kishan Chand Parwani	48,905	43.96	
Independent	Ali Mardan Shah	2,107	1.89	
Others	Others (four candidates)	2,070	1.87	
Turnout		114,242	43.69	
Total valid votes		111,243	97.38	
Rejected ballots		2,999	2.62	
Majority		9,256	8.32	
Registered electors		261,464		

== Election 2008 ==
General elections were held on 18 February 2008. Nawab Muhammad Yousuf Talpur of PPP won by 75,080 votes.

General election 2008: NA-228 Mirpurkhas-III
Party	Candidate	Votes	%	±%
PPP	Nawab Yousuf Talpur	75,080	57.32	▲5.04
Independent	Muhammad Qasim Soomro	30,079	22.96	
PML(F)	Pir Noor Muhammad Shah Jeelani	24,210	18.48	
Others	Others (fifteen candidates)	1,617	1.24	
Turnout		136,944	49.83	▲6.14
Total valid votes		130,986	95.65	
Rejected ballots		5,958	4.35	
Majority		45,001	34.36	▲26.04
Registered electors		274,851		
PPP hold				

== Election 2013 ==
General elections were held on 11 May 2013. Nawab Muhammad Yousuf Talpur of PPP won by 99,700 votes and became the member of National Assembly.

General election 2013: NA-228 Mirpurkhas-III
Party	Candidate	Votes	%	±%
PPP	Nawab Yousuf Talpur	99,700	50.73	▼6.59
PTI	Shah Mahmood Qureshi	86,134	43.83	
Others	Others (twelve candidates)	10,689	5.44	
Turnout		206,428	69.96	▲20.13
Total valid votes		196,523	95.20	
Rejected ballots		9,905	4.80	
Majority		13,566	6.90	▼27.46
Registered electors		295,065		
PPP hold				

== Election 2018 ==
General elections were held on 25 July 2018.

General election 2018: NA-220 Umerkot
Party	Candidate	Votes	%	±%
PPP	Nawab Yousuf Talpur	163,287	59.35	▲8.62
PTI	Shah Mahmood Qureshi	104,376	37.94	
Others	Others (five candidates)	7,449	2.71	
Turnout		286,629	62.06	▼7.90
Total valid votes		275,112	95.98	
Rejected ballots		11,517	4.02	
Majority		58,911	21.41	▲14.51
Registered electors		461,867		
PPP hold		Swing	N/A	

== Election 2024 ==
Elections were held on 8 February 2024. Nawab Yousuf Talpur won the election with 179,188 votes.

General election 2024: NA-213 Umerkot
Party	Candidate	Votes	%	±%
PPP	Nawab Yousuf Talpur	179,188	62.82	▲3.47
PML(N)	Mir Amanullah Khan Talpur	44,961	15.76	▲13.91
PTI	Lal Chand Malhi (Note: Filed nomination papers as PTI candidate but ECP allowed him to run as an Independent)	38,648	13.55	▼24.39
Others	Others (sixteen candidates)	22,432	7.86	
Turnout		302,857	51.39	▼10.67
Total valid votes		285,229	94.18	
Rejected ballots		17,628	5.82	
Majority		134,227	47.06	▲25.65
Registered electors		589,350		
PPP hold				

== By-election 2025 ==
A by-election will be held on 17 April 2025, due to the death of Nawab Yousuf Talpur, the previous member from this seat. Saba Talpur, his widow, won the election with 161,934 votes.

By-election 2025: NA-213 Umerkot
Party	Candidate	Votes	%	±%
PPP	Saba Talpur	161,934	64.33	▲1.51
PTI	Lal Chand Malhi	81,160	32.24	▲18.65
Others	Others (sixteen candidates)	8,619	3.42	
Turnout		261,784	42.99	▼8.40
Total valid votes		251,713	96.15	
Rejected ballots		10,071	3.85	
Majority		80,774	32.09	▼14.97
Registered electors		608,997		
PPP hold				

== See also ==
- NA-212 Mirpur Khas-II
- NA-214 Tharparkar-I
