= NA-214 Tharparkar-I =

Constituency of the National Assembly of Pakistan

- Constituency for the National Assembly of Pakistan
- Region: Dhali, Nagarparkar Tehsils and Chachro Tehsil (partly) including Chachro town of Tharparkar District
- Electorate: 308,482

Current constituency
- Party: Pakistan People's Party
- Member(s): Pir Ameer Ali Shah Jeelani
- Created from: NA-230 Tharparkar-II

NA-214 Tharparkar-I (این اے-214، تھرپارکر-1) is a constituency for the National Assembly of Pakistan.

== Assembly Segments ==
Constituency number	Constituency	District	Current MPA	Party
52	PS-52 Tharparkar-I	Tharparkar District	Dost Muhammad Rahimoon	PPP
53	PS-53 Tharparkar-II	Tharparkar District	Muhammad Qasim Soomro	PPP

== Members of Parliament ==
=== 2018–2023: NA-221 Tharparkar-I ===
Election	Member	Party
2018	Pir Noor Muhammad Shah Jeelani	PPPP
2021 by-election	Pir Ameer Ali Shah Jeelani	PPPP

=== 2024–present: NA-214 Tharparkar-I ===
Election	Member	Party
2024	Pir Ameer Ali Shah Jeelani	PPPP

== Election 2002 ==
General elections were held on 10 October 2002. Ghulam Hyder Samejo of National Alliance won by 59,639 votes.

General election 2002: NA-230 Tharparkar-II
Party	Candidate	Votes	%	±%
NA	Dr. Ghulam Hyder Sameijo	59,639	61.14	
PPP	Pir Imdad Ali Shah Jilani	36,785	37.71	
Others	Others (four candidates)	1,123	1.15	
Turnout		101,704	47.86	
Total valid votes		97,547	95.91	
Rejected ballots		4,157	4.09	
Majority		22,854	23.43	
Registered electors		212,494		

== Election 2008 ==
General elections were held on 18 February 2008. Ghulam Hyder Samejo of PML-Q won by 109,580 votes.

General election 2008: NA-230 Tharparkar-II
Party	Candidate	Votes	%	±%
PML(Q)	Dr. Ghulam Hyder Sameijo	109,580	71.59	
PPP	Imam Ali Samejo	43,436	28.38	
Others	Others (eleven candidates)	41	0.03	
Turnout		159,142	66.99	
Total valid votes		153,057	96.18	
Rejected ballots		6,085	3.82	
Majority		66,144	43.21	
Registered electors		237,555		
PML(Q) gain from NA				

== Election 2013 ==
General elections were held on 11 May 2013. Pir Noor Muhammad Shah Jeelani of PPP won and became the member of National Assembly.

General election 2013: NA-230 Tharparkar-II
Party	Candidate	Votes	%	±%
PPP	Pir Noor Muhammad Shah Jeelani	61,903	47.88	
PTI	Shah Mahmood Qureshi	59,852	46.29	
Others	Others (ten candidates)	7,538	5.83	
Turnout		138,283	67.95	
Total valid votes		129,293	93.50	
Rejected ballots		8,990	6.50	
Majority		2,051	1.59	
Registered electors		203,512		
PPP hold				

== Election 2018 ==
General elections were held on 25 July 2018.

General election 2018: NA-221 Tharparkar-I
Party	Candidate	Votes	%	±%
PPP	Pir Noor Muhammad Shah Jeelani	80,047	50.46	
PTI	Shah Mahmood Qureshi	72,884	45.94	
Others	Others (four candidates)	5,963	3.60	
Turnout		166,527	68.68	
Total valid votes		158,894	94.39	
Rejected ballots		9,414	5.61	
Majority		6,971	4.43	
Registered electors		242,458		
PPP hold		Swing	N/A	

== By-election 2021 ==
By-election was held on 21 February 2021 after the death of Pir Noor Muhammad Shah Jeelani. Pir Ameer Ali Shah Jeelani won the election with 102,232 votes.

By-election 2021: NA-221 Tharparkar-I
Party	Candidate	Votes	%	±%
PPP	Pir Ameer Ali Shah Jeelani	102,232	63.71	▲13.25
PTI	Nizamuddin Rahimoon	52,522	32.73	▼13.21
TLP	Faqeer Gul Hassan	1,707	1.06	▼1.43
Others	Others (nine candidates)	3,998	2.49	
Turnout		166,196	58.96	▼9.72
Total valid votes		160,459	96.55	
Rejected ballots		5,737	3.45	
Majority		49,710	30.98	▲26.55
Registered electors		281,900		
PPP hold		Swing	N/A	

== Election 2024 ==
General elections were held on 8 February 2024. Pir Ameer Ali Shah Jeelani won the election with 132,365 votes.

General election 2024: NA-214 Tharparkar-I
Party	Candidate	Votes	%	±%
PPP	Pir Ameer Ali Shah Jeelani	132,365	61.72	▼1.99
GDA	Abdul Razzaque Rahimoon	60,829	28.36	
PTI	Zain Qureshi (Note: Filed nomination papers as PTI candidate but ECP allowed him to run as an Independent)	16,844	7.85	▼24.88
Others	Others (eight candidates)	4,416	2.06	
Turnout		221,901	71.93	▲12.97
Total valid votes		214,454	96.64	
Rejected ballots		7,347	3.36	
Majority		71,536	33.36	▲2.38
Registered electors		308,482		
PPP hold				

== See also ==
- NA-213 Umerkot
- NA-215 Tharparkar-II
