= NA-215 Tharparkar-II =

Constituency of the National Assembly of Pakistan

- Constituency for the National Assembly of Pakistan
- Region: Kaloi, Diplo, Mithi and Islamkot Tehsils and Chachro Tehsil (partly) of Tharparkar District
- Electorate: 415,109

Current constituency
- Party: Pakistan People's Party
- Member(s): Mahesh Kumar Malani
- Created from: NA-229 Tharparkar-I

NA-215 Tharparkar-II (این اے-215، تھرپارکر-2) is a constituency for the National Assembly of Pakistan.

== Assembly Segments ==
| Constituency number | Constituency | District | Current MPA | Party |
|---|---|---|---|---|
| 54 | PS-54 Tharparkar-III | Tharparkar District | Fakeer Sher Muhammad Bilalani | PPP |
| 55 | PS-55 Tharparkar-IV | Tharparkar District | Arbab Lutfullah | PPP |

== Members of Parliament ==
=== 2018–2023: NA-222 Tharparkar-II ===
| Election | Member | Party |
|---|---|---|
| 2018 | Mahesh Kumar Malani | PPPP |

=== 2024–present: NA-215 Tharparkar-II ===
| Election | Member | Party |
|---|---|---|
| 2024 | Mahesh Kumar Malani | PPPP |

== Election 2002 ==
General elections were held on 10 October 2002. Arbab Ghulam Rahim of National Alliance won by 86,196 votes.

General election 2002: NA-229 Tharparkar-I
| Party | Candidate | Votes | % | ±% |
|---|---|---|---|---|
| NA | Arbab Ghulam Rahim | 86,196 | 70.33 | |
| PPP | Gul Muhammad Lot | 34,342 | 28.02 | |
| Others | Others (four candidates) | 2,022 | 1.65 | |
| Turnout | | 125,614 | 50.05 | |
| Total valid votes | | 122,560 | 97.57 | |
| Rejected ballots | | 3,054 | 2.43 | |
| Majority | | 51,854 | 42.31 | |
| Registered electors | | 250,983 | | |

== By-election 2003 ==
Arbab Zakaullah returned Uncontested

== Election 2008 ==
General elections were held on 18 February 2008. Arbab Zakaullah of PML-Q won by 135,697 votes.

General election 2008: NA-229 Tharparkar-I
| Party | Candidate | Votes | % | ±% |
|---|---|---|---|---|
| PML(Q) | Arbab Zakaullah | 135,697 | 82.44 | |
| PPP | Mahesh Kumar Malhani | 28,411 | 17.26 | |
| Others | Others (seven candidates) | 489 | 0.30 | |
| Turnout | | 168,569 | 65.93 | |
| Total valid votes | | 164,597 | 97.64 | |
| Rejected ballots | | 3,972 | 2.36 | |
| Majority | | 107,286 | 65.18 | |
| Registered electors | | 255,690 | | |
| PML(Q) gain from NA | | | | |

== Election 2013 ==
General elections were held on 11 May 2013. Faqir Sher Muhammad Bilaiani of PPP won the seat and became a member of National Assembly.

General election 2013: NA-229 Tharparkar-I
| Party | Candidate | Votes | % | ±% |
|---|---|---|---|---|
| PPP | Faqir Sher Muhammad Bilalani | 88,218 | 49.42 | |
| Independent | Arbab Togachi Fawad Razzak | 86,097 | 48.23 | |
| Others | Others (twelve candidates) | 4,194 | 2.35 | |
| Turnout | | 187,149 | 69.78 | |
| Total valid votes | | 178,509 | 95.38 | |
| Rejected ballots | | 8,640 | 4.62 | |
| Majority | | 2,121 | 1.19 | |
| Registered electors | | 268,217 | | |
| PPP hold | | | | |

== Election 2018 ==
General elections were held on 25 July 2018. This constituency had the highest total turnout in all of Pakistan.

General election 2018: NA-222 Tharparkar-II
| Party | Candidate | Votes | % | ±% |
|---|---|---|---|---|
| PPP | Mahesh Kumar Malani | 106,630 | 47.91 | |
| GDA | Arbab Zakaullah | 87,251 | 39.20 | |
| Others | Others (twelve candidates) | 28,696 | 12.89 | |
| Turnout | | 235,340 | 70.91 | |
| Total valid votes | | 222,577 | 94.58 | |
| Rejected ballots | | 12,763 | 5.42 | |
| Majority | | 19,379 | 8.71 | |
| Registered electors | | 331,872 | | |
| PPP hold | | Swing | N/A | |

== Election 2024 ==
Elections were held on 8 February 2024. Mahesh Kumar Malani won the election with 135,287 votes.

General election 2024: NA-215 Tharparkar-II
| Party | Candidate | Votes | % | ±% |
|---|---|---|---|---|
| PPP | Mahesh Kumar Malani | 135,287 | 50.07 | ▲2.16 |
| GDA | Arbab Ghulam Rahim | 114,329 | 42.31 | ▲3.11 |
| Others | Others (eighteen candidates) | 20,584 | 7.62 | |
| Turnout | | 282,092 | 67.96 | ▼2.95 |
| Total valid votes | | 270,200 | 95.78 | |
| Rejected ballots | | 11,892 | 4.22 | |
| Majority | | 20,958 | 7.76 | ▼0.95 |
| Registered electors | | 415,109 | | |
| PPP hold | | | | |

== See also ==
- NA-214 Tharparkar-I
- NA-216 Matiari
