= NA-223 Badin-II =

Constituency of the National Assembly of Pakistan

- Constituency for the National Assembly of Pakistan
- Region: Shaheed Fazil Rahu and Badin Tehsils and Tando Bago Tehsil (partly) of Badin District
- Electorate: 470,581

Current constituency
- Party: Pakistan People's Party
- Member(s): Rasool Bakhsh Chandio
- Created from: NA-225 Badin-II

NA-223 Badin-II (این اے-223، بدين-2) is a constituency for the National Assembly of Pakistan.

== Assembly Segments ==
Constituency number	Constituency	District	Current MPA	Party
70	PS-70 Badin-III	Badin District	Sardar Arbab Ameer Amanullah Khan	PPP
71	PS-71 Badin-IV	Badin District	Taj Muhammad Mallah	PPP
72	PS-72 Badin-V	Badin District	Ismail Rahoo	PPP

== Members of Parliament ==
=== 2018–2023: NA-230 Badin-II ===
Election	Member	Party
2018	Fahmida Mirza	GDA

=== 2024–present: NA-223 Badin-II ===
Election	Member	Party
2024	Rasool Bakhsh Chandio	PPP

== Election 2002 ==
General elections were held on 10 October 2002. Fehmida Mirza of PPP won by 71,537 votes.

General election 2002: NA-225 Badin-II
Party	Candidate	Votes	%	±%
PPP	Fahmida Mirza	71,537	65.36	
PML(Q)	Khan Mohammad Halipota	33,400	30.51	
Others	Others (five candidates)	4,520	4.13	
Turnout		112,057	37.70	
Total valid votes		109,457	97.68	
Rejected ballots		2,618	2.32	
Majority		38,137	34.85	
Registered electors		297,293		

== Election 2008 ==
General elections were held on 18 February 2008. Fehmida Mirza of PPP won by 88,983 votes.

General election 2008: NA-225 Badin-II
Party	Candidate	Votes	%	±%
PPP	Fahmida Mirza	88,983	76.16	
PML(Q)	Bibi Yasmeen Shah	24,488	20.96	
Others	Others (nine candidates)	3,373	2.88	
Turnout		119,615	55.47	
Total valid votes		116,844	97.68	
Rejected ballots		2,771	2.32	
Majority		64,495	55.20	
Registered electors		215,648		
PPP hold				

== Election 2013 ==
General elections were held on 11 May 2013. Fehmida Mirza of PPP won by 110,738 votes and became the member of National Assembly.

General election 2013: NA-225 Badin-II
Party	Candidate	Votes	%	±%
PPP	Fahmida Mirza	110,738	60.59	
PML(F)	Bibi Yasmeen Shah	65,258	35.71	
Others	Others (sixteen candidates)	6,769	3.70	
Turnout		192,480	60.14	
Total valid votes		182,765	94.95	
Rejected ballots		9,715	5.05	
Majority		45,480	24.88	
Registered electors		320,072		
PPP hold				

== Election 2018 ==
General elections were held on 25 July 2018.

General election 2018: NA-230 Badin-II
Party	Candidate	Votes	%	±%
GDA	Fahmida Mirza	96,875	47.01	
PPP	Rasool Bakhsh Chandio	96,015	46.60	
Others	Others (five candidates)	13,166	6.39	
Turnout		216,319	58.17	
Total valid votes		206,056	95.26	
Rejected ballots		10,263	4.74	
Majority		860	0.41	
Registered electors		371,879		
GDA gain from PPP				

== Election 2024 ==
Elections were held on 8 February 2024. Rasool Bakhsh Chandio won the election with 115,299 votes.

General election 2024: NA-223 Badin-II
Party	Candidate	Votes	%	±%
PPP	Rasool Bakhsh Chandio	115,299	52.28	▲5.68
GDA	Muhammad Hassam Mirza	78,711	35.69	▼11.32
Others	Others (fourteen candidates)	26,529	12.03	
Turnout		233,147	49.54	▼8.63
Total valid votes		220,539	94.59	
Rejected ballots		12,608	5.41	
Majority		36,588	16.59	
Registered electors		470,581		
PPP gain from GDA				

== See also ==
- NA-222 Badin-I
- NA-224 Sujawal
