= Zafar Hussain Mirza =

Pakistani judge (1926–2015)

- ظفر حسين مرزا
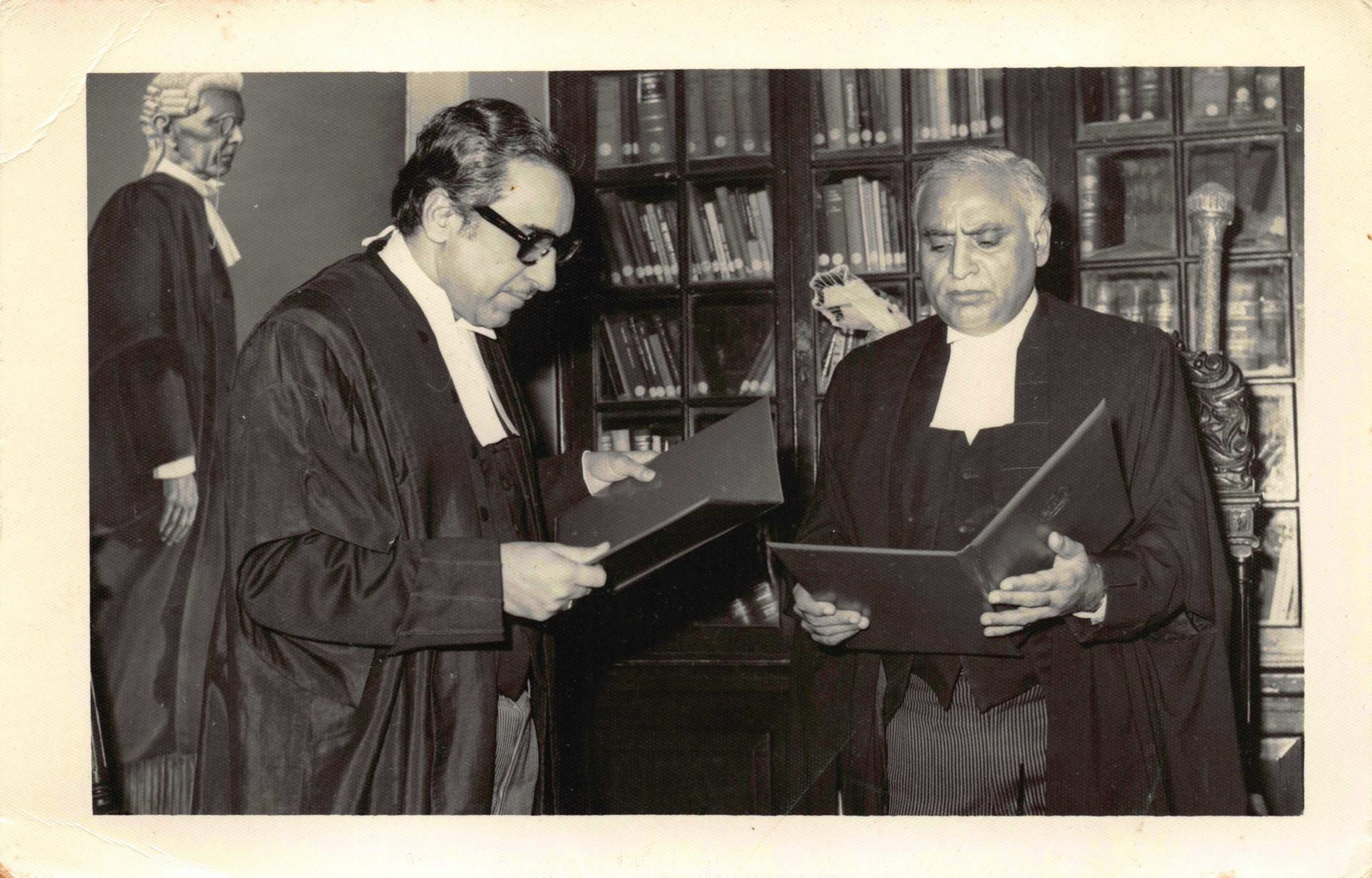
- Zaffar Hussain Mirza (left)

Senior Justice of the Supreme Court of Pakistan
- In office 4 August 1981 – 9 October 1991
- Appointed by: Zia-ul-Haq

Personal details
- Born: 10 October 1926 Tando Thoro, Hyderabad
- Died: 27 August 2015 (aged 88) Karachi
- Cause of death: Disease
- Spouse: Afroze Begum (m. 1935; div. 1999) Bilquis Begum (m. 1999)
- Children: Zulfiqar Mirza (son); Yasmeen (daughter); Shaheen (daughter); Naheed (daughter); Anita (daughter); Dr. Fawad Mirza (son); Zainab (daughter)
- Parent: Mirza Ali Nawaz Baig (father)
- Relatives: Fahmida Mirza (daughter-in-law); Hasnain Mirza (grandson)

Zafar Hussain Mirza (Sindhi: ظفر حسين مرزا;10 October 1926 – 27 August 2015) was a Pakistani judge and the father of former Home Minister of Sindh Zulfiqar Mirza. He was also the grandfather of Hasnain Mirza.

== Early life ==
Mirza was born on October 10, 1926, in Tando Thoro, Hyderabad, to Mirza Ali Nawaz Baig.

The roots of his family are traced back to Central Asia, from where his great-grandfather migrated in 1805 to Hyderabad, adopted by Mir Karam Ali Talpur, the ruler of the Mir dynasty of Hyderabad. He comes from a well-known family of Hyderabad, Sindh, which has produced many civil servants, political and literary figures, including Shams-ul-Ulema Mirza Kalich Beg. His great-grandfather served in an important position in the courts of the Talpur Mirs of Hyderabad, Sindh, in the early 19th century. His father was the deputy collector of Sukkur during the British Raj.

Mirza was the father of Zulfiqar Mirza, former member of the National Assembly of Pakistan and former Home Minister of Sindh. He was also the grandfather of Barrister Hasnain Mirza (son of Zulfiqar Mirza). His daughter-in-law Fahmida Mirza served as Speaker of the National Assembly of Pakistan, the first woman in the Islamic world to serve in that position.

He attended Noor Muhammad High School in Hyderabad, S.M. Arts College in Hyderabad, and Hyderabad Law College.

He was appointed Advocate General of Sindh in 1973. He was called to the bench as a judge of the High Court of Sindh and Balochistan from October 1, 1975, to August 4, 1981. He then served as justice of the Supreme Court of Pakistan from August 4, 1981, to October 9, 1991. He also served as chairman of the Federal Public Service Commission of Pakistan from 1991 to 1997.

== Personal life ==
Zaffar Hussain Mirza married twice, first with Afroze Begum, from whom he had:

1. Zulfiqar Mirza (son)
2. Yasmeen (daughter)
3. Shaheen (daughter)
4. Naheed (daughter)

Then he married Bilquis Begum, from whom he had:

1. Anita (daughter)
2. Fawad Mirza (son)
3. Zainab (daughter)

=== Relation with Qazi Abdul Majeed Abid ===
Qazi Abdul Majeed Abid was his wife Afroze Begum's brother. And therefore he married his son with Qazi's daughter Fahmida Mirza.

== Death ==
He died in Dr Ziauddin Hospital in Karachi due to illness on 27 August 2015. He was survived by a wife, five daughters and two sons.

== See also ==
- Zulfiqar Mirza
- Fahmida Mirza
- Qazi Abdul Majeed Abid
- Hasnain Mirza
- Pir Mazhar Ul Haq
