= Ghulam Hyder Samejo =

Pakistani politician

Member of the National Assembly of Pakistan
- In office 2002–2013
- Constituency: NA-230 (Tharparkar-II)

Ghulam Hyder Samejo is a Pakistani politician who was a member of the National Assembly of Pakistan from 2002 to 2013.

== Political career ==
He was elected to the National Assembly of Pakistan from Constituency NA-230 (Tharparkar-II) as a candidate of National Alliance in th e2002 Pakistani general election. He received 59,639 votes and defeated Pir Imdad Ali Shah Jilani, a candidate of Pakistan Peoples Party (PPP).

He was re-elected to the National Assembly from Constituency NA-230 (Tharparkar-II) as a candidate of Pakistan Muslim League (Q) in the 2008 Pakistani general election. He received 109,580 votes and defeated Imam Ali Samejo, a candidate of PPP.

He ran for the seat of the National Assembly from Constituency NA-230 (Tharparkar-II) as an independent candidate in the 2013 Pakistani general election but was unsuccessful. He received 247 votes and lost the seat to Pir Noor Muhammad Shah Jeelani. In the same election, he ran for the seat of the Provincial Assembly of Sindh from Constituency PS-63 (Tharparkar-IV) as an independent candidate but was unsuccessful. He received 28,292 votes and lost the seat to Dost Muhammad Rahimoon.
