= Mahesh Kumar Malani =

Pakistani politician

Special Assistant to the PM on National Health Services, Regulations & Coordination
- In office 6 October 2022 – 10 August 2023
- President: Arif Alvi
- Prime Minister: Shehbaz Sharif

Member of the National Assembly of Pakistan
- Incumbent
- Assumed office 29 February 2024
- Constituency: NA-215 Tharparkar-II
- In office 13 August 2018 – 10 August 2023
- Constituency: NA-222 (Tharparkar-II)
- Majority: 109,056 (51.14%)
- In office 17 March 2008 – 16 March 2013
- Constituency: Reserved seat for Minorities

Member of the Provincial Assembly of Sindh
- In office 2013–2018
- Constituency: PS-61 THARPARKAR-II

Personal details
- Born: 24 October 1962 (age 63) Mithi, Sindh, Pakistan
- Party: PPP (2008-present)
- Education: Liaquat University of Medical and Health Sciences
- Occupation: Politician

Mahesh Kumar Malani (Sindhi: مهيش ڪمار ملاڻي;Urdu: مہیش کمار ملانی) is a Pakistani politician who has been a member of the National Assembly of Pakistan since February 2024 and previously served in this position from August 2018 till August 2023. He is the first non-Muslim to win a general seat (non reserved seat, seats have been reserved for minorities under the 1973 constitution) in the National Assembly of Pakistan, 16 years after non-Muslims got the right to vote and contest on general seats of the parliament and provincial assemblies in 2002 (which they had been barred from since 1985). (Note: Before the promulgation of the 1973 constitution which reserved seats for minorities, non-Muslims which had been elected include: Sindhi Hindus Aidansing Nagji Sodho, Dharamdas Motmal, Gulji Ratanji Menghwar, Lilji Akhji Sodho, Rup Chand Chelaram, Rup Chand Seoomal Luhano, Shambhoomal Hiranand Luhano, Sawaising Sonji Sodho, Teoomal Nathromal, Sirumal Kirpaldas as members of the 4th Provincial Assembly of Sindh after the 1953 Sindh provincial election (though it is unclear if these were reserved or non-reserved seats); and Buddhist Tridev Roy as a member of the 5th National Assembly of Pakistan after the 1970 Pakistani general election.)

== Political career ==
He started his political career in 1996-97 and remained President PPP District Tharparkar and president minority wing PPP Province Sindh. He contested election against Shaukat Aziz in 2004 on NA-229 Tharparkar and then he again contested general election on NA-229 Tharparkar in 2008 and elected as MNA from PPP Reserved seat for minorities from 2008-2013 and he also remained Chairman standing committee of NA on Minorities affairs. He contested election on PS-61 Tharparkar in 2013 secured 42,137 votes by defeating Arbab Naimatullah of Arbab Group (29,346) votes and Rana Hameersingh of PML-F (11,348) votes. Malani also achieved the feat of becoming the first non-Muslim Member of the Provincial Assembly after winning the Tharparkar general seat of the Sindh Assembly in 2013 after non-Muslims were allowed to contest on such seats in 2002 in the provincial and national assemblies (besides seats reserved for minorities after 1973) which they had been barred from since 1985. He served as chairman on standing committee PAS on food.

He was re-elected to the National Assembly as a candidate of PPP from NA-222 in the 2018 Pakistani general election. He received 106,630 votes and defeated Arbab Zakaullah, a candidate of the Grand Democratic Alliance (GDA). This made him the first non-Muslim elected as MNA on a general seat.

On 13 September 2022, Malani was appointed as Special Assistant to the Prime Minister with the Portfolio of National Health Services, Regulations & Coordination.

He was re-elected to the National Assembly as a candidate of PPP from NA-215 Tharparkar-II in the 2024 Pakistani general election. He received 135,287 votes and defeated Arbab Ghulam Rahim, a candidate of the GDA.

== See also ==
- Pushpa Kumari Kohli
- Veeru Kohli
- List of members of the 15th National Assembly of Pakistan
- List of Pakistan Tehreek-e-Insaf elected members (2013–2018)
