= Pir Ameer Ali Shah Jeelani =

Pakistani politician

- پیر امیر علی شاہ جیلانی

Member of the National Assembly of Pakistan
- Incumbent
- Assumed office 29 February 2024
- Constituency: NA-214 Tharparkar-I
- In office 26 February 2021 – 10 August 2023
- Constituency: NA-221 (Tharparkar-I)

Personal details
- Party: PPP (2021-present)
- Parent: Pir Noor Muhammad Shah Jeelani (father)

Pir Ameer Ali Shah Jeelani is a Pakistani politician who has been a member of the National Assembly of Pakistan since February 2024 and previously served in this position from February 2021 till August 2023.

== Political career ==
He was elected to the National Assembly of Pakistan as a candidate of Pakistan People's Party (PPP) from NA-221 Tharparkar-I in a February 2021 by-election, which was called due to the death of Pir Noor Muhammad Shah Jeelani, his father. He received 102,232 votes and defeated Nizamuddin Rahimoon, a candidate of Pakistan Tehreek-e-Insaf (PTI).

He was re-elected to the National Assembly as a candidate of PPP from NA-214 Tharparkar-I in the 2024 Pakistani general election. He received 132,365 votes and defeated Abdul Razzaque Rahimoon, a candidate of the Grand Democratic Alliance (GDA).

After the killing of Dr. Shahnawaz Kunbhar on a false allegation of blasphemy in Umerkot by the local police, Pir Ameer supported and provided safe haven for the accused police to evade the legal repercussions. Ameer is also accused of "promoting fanatic practices" by the local civil society.
