= Fakeer Sher Muhammad Bilalani =

Pakistani politician

Member of the National Assembly of Pakistan
- In office 5 June 2013 – 31 May 2018
- Constituency: NA-229 (Tharparkar-I)

Member of the Provincial Assembly of Sindh
- In office 13 August 2018 – 11 August 2023
- Constituency: PS-56 Tharparkar-III

Personal details
- Born: 2 January 1958 (age 68)
- Party: PPP (2013-present)

Faqeer Sher Muhammad Bilalani (Sindhi: فقير شير محمد بلالاڻي; Urdu: فقیر شاہ محمد بلالانی; born 2 January 1958) is a Pakistani politician who had been a member of the Provincial Assembly of Sindh from August 2018 to August 2023. Previously, he had been a member of the National Assembly of Pakistan from June 2013 to May 2018 representing Tharparkar.

== Early life ==
He was born on 2 January 1958.

== Political career ==
He ran for the seat of the National Assembly of Pakistan as an independent candidate from Constituency NA-229 (Tharparkar-I) in the 2008 Pakistani general election but was unsuccessful. He received 9 votes and lost the seat to Arbab Zakaullah. In the same election, he ran for the seat of the Provincial Assembly of Sindh as an independent candidate from Constituency PS-61 (Tharparkar-II) and from Constituency PS-62 (Tharparkar-III) but was unsuccessful. He received 7 votes from Constituency PS-61 (Tharparkar-II) and lost the seat to Arbab Zulfiqar Ali, a candidate of Pakistan Muslim League (Q) (PML-Q) and received 6 votes from Constituency PS-62 (Tharparkar-III) and lost the seat to Arbab Haji Abdullah, a candidate of PML-Q.

He was elected to the National Assembly as a candidate of Pakistan Peoples Party (PPP) from Constituency NA-229 (Tharparkar-I) in the 2013 Pakistani general election. He received 88,218 votes and defeated an independent candidate, Arbab Togachi Fawad Razzak.

He was elected to Provincial Assembly of Sindh as a candidate of PPP from Constituency PS-56 (Tharparkar-III) in the 2018 Pakistani general election.
