= Arbab Zakaullah =

Pakistani politician

Member of the National Assembly of Pakistan
- In office 2008–2013
- Constituency: NA-229 (Tharparkar-I)
- In office 2002–2004
- Constituency: NA-229 (Tharparkar-I)

Arbab Zakaullah is a Pakistani politician who was a member of the National Assembly of Pakistan from 2002 to 2004 and again from 2008 to 2013. His grandfather Arbab Togachi Mir Muhammad Nohri voted in Sindh Assembly in favor to creation of Pakistan.

== Political career ==
He was elected unopposed to the National Assembly of Pakistan from Constituency NA-229 (Tharparkar-I) as a candidate of National Alliance in a by-election held in 2002. He resigned from the National Assembly in 2004.

He was re-elected to the National Assembly from Constituency NA-229 (Tharparkar-I) as a candidate of Pakistan Muslim League (Q) (PML-Q) in the 2008 Pakistani general election. He received 135,697 votes and defeated Mahesh Kumar Malhani, a candidate of Pakistan Peoples Party (PPP). In the same election, he ran for the seat of the Provincial Assembly of Sindh from Constituency PS-60 (Tharparkar-I) and from Constituency PS-61 (Tharparkar-II) as an independent candidate but was unsuccessful. He received 6 votes from Constituency PS-60 (Tharparkar-I) and lost the seat to Arbab Ghulam Rahim, and received 62 votes from Constituency PS-61 (Tharparkar-II) and lost the seat to Arbab Zulfiqar Ali, a candidate of PML-Q.
