= Saba Talpur =

Pakistani politician

- صبا تالپور

Member of the National Assembly of Pakistan
- Incumbent
- Assumed office 16 June 2025
- Preceded by: Nawab Yousuf Talpur
- Constituency: NA-213 Umerkot

Personal details
- Party: PPP (2025-present)
- Spouse: Nawab Yousuf Talpur (died 2025)
- Children: Nawab Muhammad Taimur Talpur (son)
- Occupation: Politician

Saba Talpur (Urdu: صبا تالپور) is a Pakistani politician from Umerkot who has been a member of the National Assembly of Pakistan since June 2025.

== Political career ==
Talpur was elected to the National Assembly of Pakistan in a 2025 by-election from NA-213 Umerkot as a candidate of Pakistan People's Party (PPP). The by-election was called due to the death of Nawab Yousuf Talpur, her husband. She received 161,934 votes and defeated Lal Chand Malhi, an independent candidate supported by Pakistan Tehreek-e-Insaf (PTI). She took oath as a member of the National Assembly on 16 June 2025.
