= Ali Mardan Shah =

Pakistani politician (1957–2020)

Member of the Provincial Assembly of Sindh
- In office 2002 – 28 May 2018

Personal details
- Born: 10 January 1957 Umerkot District
- Died: 19 January 2020 (aged 63)
- Party: Pakistan Peoples Party

Syed Ali Mardan Shah (10 January 1957 – 19 January 2020) was a Pakistani politician who was a Member of the Provincial Assembly of Sindh from 1988 until his death on 19 January 2020.

== Early life ==
He was born on 10 January 1957 in Umerkot District.

He had a Bachelor of Arts degree from Allama Iqbal Open University in Islamabad.

He died on 19 January 2020 due to cardiac arrest.

== Political career ==
He was elected to the Provincial Assembly of Sindh as an independent candidate from Constituency PS-53 (Tharparkar-IV) in the 1988 Pakistani general election. He received 18,046 votes and defeated Muzaffar Hussain Shah.

He ran for the seat of the Provincial Assembly of Sindh as a candidate of Pakistan Democratic Alliance from Constituency PS-53 (Tharparkar-IV) in the 1990 Pakistani general election but was unsuccessful. He received 13,607 votes and lost the seat to Muzaffar Hussain Shah. In the same election, he ran for the seat of the National Assembly of Pakistan as an independent candidate from Constituency NA-175 (Tharparkar-II) but was unsuccessful. He received 814 votes and lost the seat to Muhammad Khan Junejo.

He was re-elected to the Provincial Assembly of Sindh as a candidate of Pakistan Peoples Party (PPP) from Constituency PS-53 (Umerkot-II) in the 1993 Pakistani general election. He received 19,947 votes and defeated ex CM sindh Muzaffar Hussain Shah. In the same election, he ran for the seat of the National Assembly as an independent candidate from Constituency NA-175 (Mirpurkhas-cum-Umerkot) but was unsuccessful. He received 150 votes and lost the seat to Nawab Muhammad Yousuf.

He ran for the seat of the Provincial Assembly of Sindh as a candidate of PPP from Constituency PS-53 (Umerkot-II) in the 1997 Pakistani general election but was unsuccessful. He received 12,302 votes and lost the seat to Muzaffar Hussain Shah.

He was re-elected to the Provincial Assembly of Sindh as a candidate of PPP from Constituency PS-70 (Mirpurkhas-VII) in the 2002 Pakistani general election. He received 26,643 votes and defeated Muzaffar Hussain Shah. In the same election, he ran for the seat of the National Assembly as an independent candidate from Constituency NA-228 (Mirpurkhas-III) but was unsuccessful. He received 2,107 votes and lost the seat to Nawab Muhammad Yousuf.

He was re-elected to the Provincial Assembly of Sindh as a candidate of PPP from Constituency PS-70 (Umerkot-II) in the 2008 Pakistani general election. He received 41,728 votes and defeated Rajveer Singh, a candidate of Pakistan Muslim League (F) (PML-F). In the same election, he ran for the seat of the National Assembly from Constituency NA-228 (Umerkot) as an independent candidate but was unsuccessful. He received 27 votes and lost the seat to Nawab Muhammad Yousuf.

He was re-elected to the Provincial Assembly of Sindh as a candidate of PPP from Constituency PS-70 (Umerkot-II) in the 2013 Pakistani general election. He received 44,934 votes and defeated Muhammad Qasim, a candidate of PML-F. In the same election, he ran for the seat of the National Assembly as an independent candidate from Constituency NA-228 (Umerkot) but was unsuccessful. He received 71 votes and lost the seat to Nawab Muhammad Yousuf.

He was re-elected to Provincial Assembly of Sindh as a candidate of PPP from Constituency PS-52 (Umerkot-II) in the 2018 Pakistani general election. and defeated another Ex CM Sindh Arbab Ghulam Raheem with lead of over 22 thousand votes.
