= Rasool Bakhsh Chandio =

Member of the National Assembly of Pakistan from Badin (2024–2029)

- رسول بخش چانڈیو

Member of the National Assembly of Pakistan
- Incumbent
- Assumed office 29 February 2024
- Constituency: NA-223 Badin-II

Personal details
- Party: PPP (2024-present)

Rasool Bakhsh Chandio (Urdu: رسول بخش چانڈیو) is a Pakistani politician who has been a member of the National Assembly of Pakistan since February 2024.

== Political career ==
Chandio contested the 2018 Pakistani general election as a candidate of Pakistan People's Party (PPP) from NA-230 Badin-II, but was unsuccessful. He received 96,015 votes and was defeated by Fahmida Mirza, a candidate of the Grand Democratic Alliance (GDA).

He was elected to the National Assembly of Pakistan in the 2024 Pakistani general election from NA-223 Badin-II as a candidate of PPP. He received 115,299 votes and defeated Muhammad Hassam Mirza, a candidate of the GDA, who received 78,711 votes.
