= Dahli Tehsil =

Pakistani administrative area

ڈاہلی
- Taluka
- Dahli
- Country: Pakistan
- Province: Sindh
- District: Tharparkar

Population (2017)
  - Total: 308,487
- Time zone: UTC+5 (PST)

Dahli (Sindhi: ڏاھلي, Urdu: ڈاہلی) is a taluka of Tharparkar District in Sindh, Pakistan. Dahli is one of the seven Talukas of Tharparkar, along with Mithi, Islamkot, Nagarparkar, Chachro, Kaloi and Diplo.

Khokhropar railway station, also known as Zero Point railway station, is located in the border town of Khokhrapar of this taluka. The Thar Express (international passenger train) connects Karachi to Jodhpur through this terminus.

== Demographics ==
The tehsil has a population of 326,034, according to the 2023 Census. Most of the population is rural (97%). Its literacy stood at 68.5% in 2023. The tehsil has the highest human density compared to other tehsils in Tharparkar.

=== Language ===
Sindhi language is spoken by almost all of the tehsil's population (99.9%).

=== Religion ===
Religions in Dahli tehsil (2023)
| Religion | Percent |
| Islam | 89.47% |
| Hinduism | 10.41% |
| Other or not stated | 0.12% |

Islam is followed by majority of the tehsil's population. Hindus form a minority population.
