= Ismail Rahoo =

Pakistani politician

- محمد اسماعيل راهو

Provincial Minister of Sindh for Supply and Prices
- In office 19 August 2018 – 11 August 2023

Provincial Minister of Sindh for Agriculture
- In office 19 August 2018 – 11 August 2023

Member of the Provincial Assembly of Sindh
- In office 13 August 2018 – 11 August 2023
- Constituency: PS-74 (Badin-V)
- In office March 2016 – May 2017
- Constituency: PS-59 (Badin-cum-T.M. Khan-III)
- In office 1997–1999
- Constituency: PS-49 (Badin-IV)
- In office 1990–1993
- Constituency: PS-49 (Badin-IV)

Personal details
- Born: 20 May 1962 (age 64) Badin, Sindh, Pakistan
- Party: PPP (1988-present)

Muhammad Ismail Rahoo (Sindhi: محمد اسماعيل راهو; born 20 May 1962) is a Pakistani politician who was the Provincial Minister of Sindh for Agriculture, Supply and Prices, from 19 August 2018 till 11 August 2023. He had been a member of the Provincial Assembly of Sindh from August 2018 till August 2023.

Previously, he was a member of the Provincial Assembly of Sindh from 1990 to 1993, from 1997 to 1999 and again from March 2016 to May 2017. Between 1990 and 1999, he served in the provincial Sindh cabinet of Chief Minister Jam Sadiq Ali and Liaquat Ali Jatoi as provincial Minister of Sindh for mines, minerals and livestock, and excise and taxation, respectively. He served as President of PML-N Sindh from July 2014 to April 2017.

== Early life and education ==
He was born on 20 May 1962 in Badin District, Pakistan to Fazil Rahu.

He has done Bachelor of Arts from the University of Karachi.

He ran for the seat of the Provincial Assembly of Sindh from the Constituency PS-49 (Badin-IV) in 1988 Pakistani general election as a candidate of ANP, an alliance between his Father’s Awaami Tehreek and other key parties around the country.

He was elected to Provincial Assembly of Sindh as an independent candidate from the Constituency PS-49 (Badin-IV) in the 1990 Pakistani general election. He received 16,312 votes and defeated Sikandar Ali Mandhro. Following his successful election, he was inducted into the Provincial Sindh cabinet of Chief Minister Jam Sadiq Ali and was appointed as provincial minister of Sindh for mines, minerals and livestock.

He ran for the seat of the Provincial Assembly of Sindh as an independent candidate from Constituency PS-49 (Badin-IV) in 1993 Pakistani general election against Sikandar Ali Mandhro.

In 1996, he quit his father’s party Awami Tehreek (Rahoo group) and joined Pakistan Muslim League (N) (PML-N).

He was re-elected to the Provincial Assembly of Sindh as a candidate of PML-N from Constituency PS-49 (Badin-IV) in 1997 Pakistani general election. He received 17,077 votes and defeated Qazi Amjad Abid Abbasi, a candidate of PPP. Following his successful election, he was inducted into the provincial Sindh cabinet of Chief Minister Liaquat Ali Jatoi and was appointed as Provincial Minister of Sindh for excise and taxation.

He was arrested following the 1999 Pakistani coup d'état and was imprisoned for two years along with the toppled government. Under the new military rule, in June 2002, he was sentenced seven years of rigorous imprisonment. In May 2003, The Sindh High Court overturned the verdict and declared it baseless after Rahoo filed an appeal to challenge his sentence by the military court.

The military government prevented him from running for office in the 2002 general election by keeping him behind bars. While he was not able to contest himself against the regime, his sister contested in the election on his behalf.

He ran for the seat of the Provincial Assembly of Sindh as a candidate of Pakistan Muslim League (Q) (PML-Q) from Constituency PS-59 (Badin-T.M.Khan-III) in 2008 Pakistani general election

He ran for the seat of the Provincial Assembly of Sindh as a candidate of PML-N from Constituency PS-59 (Badin-T.M.Khan-III) in 2013 Pakistani general election but was unsuccessful. He received 36,966 votes and lost the seat to Muhammad Nawaz Chandio, a candidate of PPP. Rahoo alleged that rigging was done in the constituency and challenged the election. In April 2015, an election tribunal de-seated Muhammad Nawaz Chandio and ordered a re-election in the constituency upon identifying elements of election rigging. Ismail Rahoo won the re-election with a clear margin, defeating the sitting government of Sindh of that time.

He was appointed as President of PML-N Sindh in July 2014. He was re-elected to the Provincial Assembly of Sindh as a candidate of PML-N from Constituency PS-59 (Badin-T.M.Khan-III) in by-election held in March 2016. He received 35,880 votes and defeated Mohammad Nawaz Chandio, a candidate of PPP.

In April 2017, he resigned as President of PML-N Sindh citing personal reasons. Reportedly, Rahoo wanted the leadership to play a more active role within Sindh. In May, he resigned from his Sindh Assembly seat and announced to join PPP.

He was re-elected to the Provincial Assembly of Sindh as a candidate of PPP from Constituency PS-74 (Badin-V) in 2018 Pakistani general election, defeating Zulfiqar Mirza in a landslide margin. Ismail Rahoo gained 44,953 votes while his runner-up received 28,886 votes.

On 19 August, he was inducted into the provincial Sindh cabinet of Chief Minister Syed Murad Ali Shah and was made Provincial Minister of Sindh for Agriculture with the additional ministerial portfolio of Supply and Prices, Universities and Board, Environment, Climate Change and Coastal Development.
