= Sikandar Ali Mandhro =

Pakistani politician (1943–2022)

Dr. Sikandar Ali Mandhro Minister

Health, Religious Affairs, Zakat & Ushr
- In office 2016 – 19 March 2018
- Constituency: PS-58 (Badin-II)

Member of the Provincial Assembly of Sindh
- In office 31 May 2013 – 19 March 2018
- In office 2008–2013
- In office 2002–2007
- In office 1997–1999
- In office 1993–1996

Minister for Parliamentary Affairs and Environment
- In office 2013–2016

Member of the Senate of Pakistan
- In office March 2018 – 11 June 2022

Personal details
- Born: 7 July 1943 Badin District, Sind Province, British Raj
- Died: 11 June 2022 (aged 78) U.S.
- Party: Pakistan Peoples Party Parliamentarians
- Spouse: Khalida Mandhro (née Memon)
- Education: University of Sindh; College of Physicians and Surgeons Pakistan
- Occupation: Politician
- Profession: Doctor

Dr. Sikandar Ali Mandhro (Sindhi: ڊاڪٽر سڪندر علي مينڌرو; 7 July 1943 – 11 June 2022) was a Pakistani politician hailing from Badin District, Sindh, Pakistan, who belonged to Pakistan Peoples Party Parliamentarians. He was facing Cardiovascular Disease .

== Education ==
Dr. Sikandar Ali Mandhro achieved his Bachelor of Medicine, Bachelor of Surgery (MBBS) and MA (Economics) from University of Sindh and MCPS (Medicine) from College of Physicians and Surgeons Pakistan.

== Political career 1993–2007 ==
Sikandar Ali Mandhro belonged to constituency PS-58 (Badin-II) (Old Badin-IV). He had served as a Member in the Provincial Assembly of Sindh multiple times from 1993 to 1996, from 1997 to 1999, from 2002 to 2007.

== Political career 2008–2013 ==
In the 2008 Pakistani general election he again served as Member in the Provincial Assembly of Sindh from 2008 to 2013 from constituency PS-58 (Badin-II). He was also serving as Member of several committees such as: Standing Committee on Finance and Inter Provincial Coordination, Standing Committee on Health, Standing Committee on Irrigation and Power, Standing Committee on Planning and Development (chairperson), Finance Committee, Special Committee and others from 2008 to 2013.

== Political career 2013–2016 ==
Dr. Sikandar Ali Mandhro served as Minister of Health, Religious Affairs, Zakat & Ushr, Member of the assembly and Member of the Finance Committee in the Provincial Assembly of Sindh. He also served as Minister for Parliamentary Affairs and Environment from 2013 to 2016.
