= Agha Javed Pathan =

Chairman of the Pakistan Medical & Dental Association (1972–2018)

Dr. Agha Javed Pathan
- Born: May 4, 1972; Shikarpur, Sindh, Pakistan
- Died: November 4, 2018 (aged 46)
- Education: Liaquat University of Medical and Health Sciences, Jamshoro
- Occupations: Chairman, Pakistan Medical & Dental Association

Agha Javed Pathan (Urdu: آغا جاوید پٹھان ) was a political activist from Sindh, Pakistan, who practiced as a doctor in Karachi. He was accused of throwing a shoe at Arbab Ghulam Rahim (former Chief Minister of Sindh Province) in April 2008. He was accused of hitting Arbab during his first visit to Sindh Assembly after the 2008 general election . Later Agha Javed was arrested and subsequently released due to a lack of evidence. He died on 4 November 2018 in a road accident in Karachi.

== Biography ==
Dr. Agha Javed, a Sindhi Pathan, was born and raised at Shikarpur, Sindh. He graduated from Liaquat University of Medical and Health Sciences, Jamshoro in 1996 with a Bachelor of Dental Surgery. He was a political activist since his student-life and was the Information Secretary of Sindh People Students Federation when he was in university. After his graduation he moved to Karachi and was admitted to Karachi University, gaining a degree in public administration in 2002, and a Master of Administrative Sciences (Health Management) in 2006. He was a close aide of Mir Murtaza Bhutto who was the exiled brother of Prime Minister Benazir Bhutto.

=== Political activities ===
- Raised awareness of the targeted killing of doctors in Karachi in 1999 as the Chairman of the Pakistan Medical and Dental Association
- Condemned the physical manhandling of doctors by a group of attendants and friends of a patient at Jinnah Post Graduate Medical Centre in July 2008 and urged authorities to carry out investigations of the incidence, and called for measures to protect doctors and other hospital staff from such attacks.
- Led a hunger strike in February 2011 at the Karachi Press Club for the extradition of Pervez Musharraf after latter's refusal to appear before an anti-terrorism court.
- Demanded immediate opening of the unused Shaheed Benazir Bhutto Medical College in 2011, which was launched by President Asif Ali Zardari in 2009, which was supposed to be functional in 2010.

== Shoe throwing incident ==
Javed was nominated in a case of throwing a shoe at the former Chief Minister of Sindh province. He was accused of hitting the head of Arbab Ghulam Rahim on April 7, 2008 with his shoes inside the Sindh Assembly building after an assembly session. In which, a video of the shoe-throw was shown globally. Three cases (FIR Nos 199/2008, 200/2008 and 201/2008) were registered against him under Sections 337-A, 392 of the Pakistan Penal Code, 13-D of the Arms Ordinance and Section 6/9-A of Control of Narcotic Substance Act at Preedy police station. He was arrested after police raided his home, charged with attacking with Arbab Ghulam Rahim, committing dacoity and possession of illegal weapons and narcotics. He was later he was released by the court due to a lack of evidence.

Immediately after the incident, the Pakistan Peoples Party activist Kazim Hakim offered Rs. 600,000 for the shoe thrown at Arbab Ghulam Rahim; Sardar Ameen Mengal, a leader from Pakistan Peoples Party, Larkana chapter offered Rs.9,000,000 for the shoe.
