= Nawab Yousuf Talpur =

Pakistani politician (1943–2025)

Nawab Muhammad Yousuf Talpur

Member of the National Assembly of Pakistan
- In office 29 February 2024 – 18 February 2025
- Preceding: Saba Talpur
- Constituency: NA-213 Umerkot
- In office 13 August 2018 – 10 August 2023
- Constituency: NA-220 (Umerkot)
- In office 1 June 2013 – 31 May 2018
- Constituency: NA-228 (Umerkot)
- In office 17 March 2008 – 16 March 2013
- Constituency: NA-228 (Umerkot)
- In office 16 November 2002 – 15 November 2007
- Constituency: NA-228 (Mirpurkhas-III)
- In office 15 October 1993 – 5 November 1996
- Constituency: NA-175 Mirpurkhas-cum-Umerkot

Personal details
- Born: 15 January 1943 Jamesabad, Sind Province
- Died: 18 February 2025 (aged 82) Karachi, Sindh, Pakistan
- Party: PPP (1993–2025)
- Spouse: Saba Talpur
- Children: Nawab Muhammad Younis Talpur (son) Nawab Muhammad Taimur Talpur (son)

Nawab Muhammad Yousuf Talpur (Urdu: نواب محمد یوسف تالپور; 15 January 1943 – 18 February 2025) was a Pakistani politician who was a member of the National Assembly of Pakistan from February 2024 until his death, and had previously served in this position from August 2018 till August 2023, from 2002 to May 2018, and from 1993 to 1996.

== Background ==
Talpur was born in Jamesabad, Sind Province on 15 January 1943. He had two children.

== Political career ==
Talpur was elected to the National Assembly of Pakistan as a candidate of Pakistan People's Party (PPP) from NA-175 Mirpurkhas-cum-Umerkot in the 1993 Pakistani general election. He received 40,780 votes and defeated Pir Noor Muhammad Shah Jeelani, a candidate of Pakistan Muslim League (N) (PML-N).

He contested the 1997 Pakistani general election as a candidate of PPP from NA-175 Mirpurkhas-cum-Umerkot, but was unsuccessful. He received 22,310 votes and was defeated by Pir Noor Muhammad Shah Jeelani, a candidate of PML-N.

He was re-elected to the National Assembly as a candidate of PPP from NA-228 (Mirpurkhas-III) in the 2002 Pakistani general election. He received 58,161 votes and defeated Kishan Chand Parwani, a candidate of the National Alliance (NA).

He was re-elected to the National Assembly as a candidate of PPP from NA-228 (Umerkot) in the 2008 Pakistani general election. He received 75,080 votes and defeated an independent candidate, Muhammad Qasim Soomro.

Talpur was re-elected to the National Assembly as a candidate of PPP from NA-228 (Umerkot) in the 2013 Pakistani general election. He received 99,700 votes and defeated Shah Mehmood Qureshi, a candidate of Pakistan Tehreek-e-Insaf (PTI).

He was re-elected to the National Assembly as a candidate of PPP from NA-220 (Umerkot) in the 2018 Pakistani general election and defeated Shah Mehmood Qureshi of PTI.

He was re-elected to the National Assembly as a candidate of PPP from NA-213 Umerkot in the 2024 Pakistani general election. He received 179,188 votes and defeated Mir Amanullah Khan Talpur, a candidate of Pakistan Muslim League (N).

== Death ==
Talpur died in Karachi on 18 February 2025, at the age of 82. He was admitted into a private hospital after suffering from a lung infection.
