= Hasnain Mirza =

Pakistani lawyer and barrister (born 1983)

Hasnain Ali Mirza
- حسنین مرزا هسنين مرزا

Member of the Provincial Assembly of Sindh
- In office 13 August 2018 – 11 August 2023
- Constituency: PS-72 Badin-III
- In office 13 October 2011 – 28 May 2018

Personal details
- Born: 19 February 1983 (age 43) Badin, Sindh, Pakistan
- Party: GDA (2018-present)
- Relations: Qazi Abdul Majeed Abid (grandfather); Zafar Hussain Mirza (grandfather)
- Children: Salaar Ali Mirza, Amani Mirza, Alaia Mirza
- Parent(s): Zulfiqar Mirza (father); Fahmida Mirza (mother)
- Occupation: Barrister, Politician

Hasnain Ali Mirza (Sindhi: حسنين علي مرزا); Urdu: حسنین مرزا;born 29 May 1983) is a Pakistani lawyer and barrister who was elected as Member of the Provincial Assembly (MPA). He is the son of Zulfiqar Mirza and federal minister Fahmida Mirza. He is the grandson (through father) of lawyer and politician, (late) Zafar Hussain Mirza.

== Early life ==
Mirza was born on 29 May 1983 in Karachi to Fahmida Mirza and Zulfiqar Mirza. He was elected in 2011 as barrister and Member of Provincial Assembly.
