= Chachro Raid =

1971 war battle in Sindh

Battle of Chachro
- Part of the Indo-Pakistani War of 1971
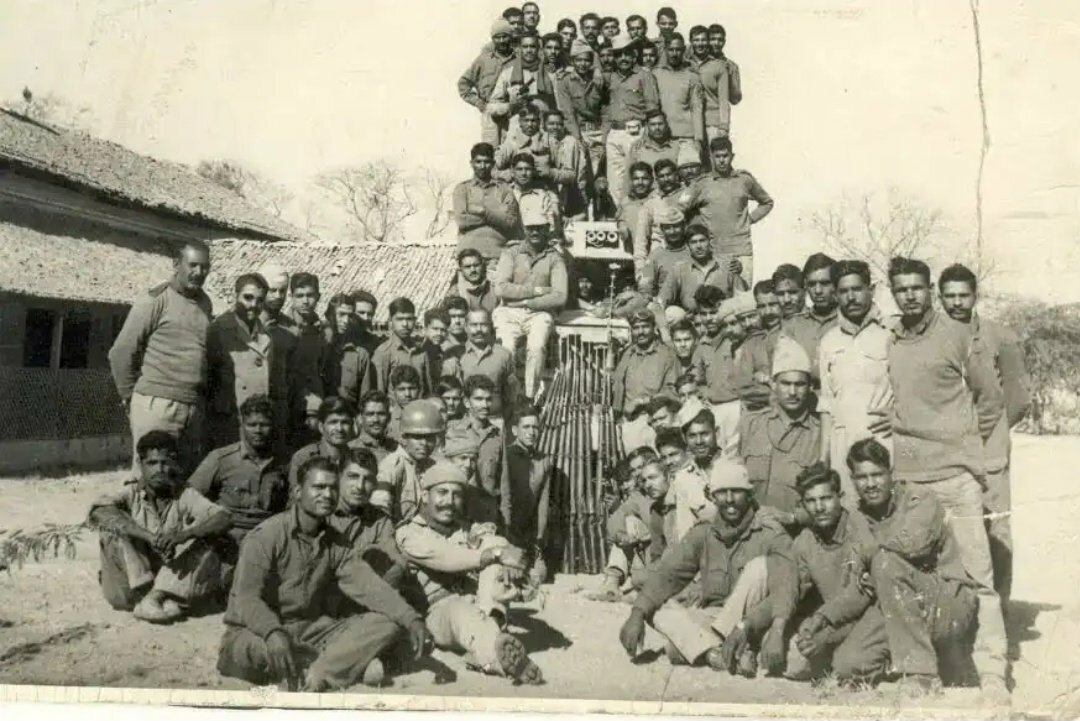
- 10 Para (SF) team after capturing Chachro town
Date	5–10 December 1971 (5 days)
Location	Chachro, Sindh, Pakistan 25.1115°N 70.2613°E
Result	Indian victory

Belligerents
India	Pakistan

Commanders and leaders
(India) Lt Col Bhawani Singh	Unknown

Units involved
Indian Army: 11 Infantry Division; 330 Brigade; 85 Brigade; 31 Brigade; 17 Grenadiers 10 Para SF	Pakistan Army: 33 Infantry Division; 55 Infantry Brigade (initially); 60 Infantry Brigade (following the fall of Chachro and failure of Battle of Longewala); Pakistan Rangers

Casualties and losses
Indian claim: None	~3,000 sq miles of territory lost Indian claim: 36 killed 22 captured 4,000 sq miles of sandy wastes lost
- Location of the battle with geopolitical borders in Pakistan Chachro (Sindh)

The Battle of Chachro involved a division-sized assault and multiple raids by the Indian Armed Forces on the eastern town of Chachro in the Tharparkar district of West Pakistan. The battle resulted in India capturing the town and around 3,000 sq. miles of surrounding sandy wasteland. While a large area was captured, it had little to no economic or political impact on Pakistan owing to the region's emptiness.

== Background ==
The 10 Para (Special Forces) was raised in 1967 as an offshoot of 9 Para (Special Forces). The unit specializes in desert warfare. From five months prior to the 1971 war, two teams (Alpha and Charlie) of 10 Para SF were trained intensively to carry out long-range raids, inspired by British SAS raids of German airfields in North Africa during the Second World War.

== The raid ==
The following account of the raid is made entirely from Indian sources.

The teams of 10 Para SF were given the objective of striking Pakistani positions 80 km inside, hitting supply lines and creating confusion. The raid began on the night of 5 December, with the Alpha team advancing quietly through the night towards Chachro. However, they were spotted by a Pakistani outpost in the morning and came under attack, and were forced to take cover. To break the impasse, Naik Nihal Singh took a jeep and charged at high speed at the Pakistani post, firing the mounted light machine gun. This allowed the rest of the team to also attack, with 18 machine guns firing in unison, causing the Pakistani defenders to flee.

Next, on the night of 7 December, the raiders moved to capture the wing headquarters of the Pakistan Rangers in Chachro. The Alpha team took covering positions, while the Charlie team moved in for the offensive. By first light, Chachro was captured. In the raid, 17 Rangers were killed, and 12 were captured alive. The post and the prisoners were handed over to the 20 Rajput Battalion which had linked up.

After that, the team crept towards Virawah, reaching it close to midnight. They attacked the Ranger camp there, resulting in the Rangers at Virawah also abandoning the post and fleeing. The unit then proceeded towards the tehsil headquarters of Nagarparkar and captured it as well before the daybreak of 8 December. After the arrival of the regular infantry, the prisoners were handed over. Thereafter, the unit was tasked with destroying an ammunition dump at Islamkot. However, on arrival, it found the place to be empty. While heading back towards India, it spotted a Pakistani convoy at Lumio and ambushed it, killing 20 Pakistani soldiers and taking others prisoners.

== Result ==
By the end of the war, India captured an area of about 13,000 sq km of Sindh up to Umerkot. India continued to hold the captured territory until 22 December 1972 and handed it over to Pakistan after the Shimla Pact of 1972. During this time, an Indian sub-post office was opened at Chachro and allotted a Postal Index Number.

10 Para SF was conferred the Battle Honour 'Chachro 1971', and received 10 gallantry awards including a Mahavir Chakra awarded to its commanding officer Lt Col Bhawani Singh.

The Chachro Raid was the first long-distance raid across desert terrain undertaken by the Indian Army, and became a benchmark for future operations of a similar nature.

== See also ==
- India-Pakistan battles
- Indo-Pakistani wars and conflicts
