= PS-52 Tharparkar-I =

Constituency of the Provincial Assembly of Sindh, Pakistan

- Constituency for the Provincial Assembly of Sindh
- Region: Dahli Tehsil, Chachro Tehsil (partly) of Tharparkar District
- Electorate: 120,989

Current constituency
- Member: Vacant
- Created from: PS-63 Tharparkar-IV (2002-2018); PS-54 Tharparkar-I (2018-2023)

PS-52 Tharparkar-I (پی ایس-52، تھرپارکر-1) is a constituency of the Provincial Assembly of Sindh.

== General elections 2024 ==
Provincial election 2024: PS-52 Tharparkar-I
Party	Candidate	Votes	%	±%
PPP	Dost Muhammad Rahimoon	70,429	80.37	
GDA	Sher Khan	15,853	18.09	
Others	Others (nine candidates)	1,354	1.54	
Turnout		89,769	74.20	
Total valid votes		87,636	97.62	
Rejected ballots		2,133	2.38	
Majority		54,576	62.28	
Registered electors		120,989		
PPP gain from GDA				

== General elections 2018 ==
Provincial election 2018: PS-54 Tharparkar-I
Party	Candidate	Votes	%	±%
GDA	Abdul Razzaque	26,510	41.08	
PPP	Dost Muhammad	25,403	39.37	
Independent	Pir Imdad Ali Shah Jeelani	10,117	15.68	
Independent	Dilawar Khan Malkani	967	1.50	
Independent	Jai Shankar	391	0.61	
Independent	Liaquat Ali	350	0.54	
Independent	Habibullah	273	0.42	
MMA	Abdul Aziz	240	0.37	
Independent	Mushtaq Ali	94	0.15	
Independent	Mumtaz Ali Rahimoon	92	0.14	
Independent	Ali Akber	71	0.11	
Independent	Rustam Ali Samejo	23	0.04	
Majority		1,107	1.71	
Valid ballots		64,531		
Rejected ballots		4,240		
Turnout		69,771		
Registered electors		99,101		
hold				

== General elections 2013 ==
Contesting candidates	Party affiliation	Votes polled

== General elections 2008 ==
Contesting candidates	Party affiliation	Votes polled

== See also ==
- PS-51 Umerkot-III
- PS-53 Tharparkar-II
