= PS-72 Badin-V =

Constituency of the Provincial Assembly of Sindh, Pakistan

- Constituency for the Provincial Assembly of Sindh
- Region: Golarchi Tehsil of Badin District
- Electorate: 163,422

Current constituency
- Member: Vacant
- Created from: PS-59 Badin-V (2002-2018); PS-74 Badin-V (2018-2023)

PS-72 Badin-V (پی ایس-72، بدین-5) is a constituency of the Provincial Assembly of Sindh in Pakistan.

== General elections 2024 ==
Provincial election 2024: PS-72 Badin-V
Party	Candidate	Votes	%	±%
PPP	Ismail Rahoo	39,849	55.50	
GDA	Ameer Hassan	24,296	33.84	
Independent	Hassan Ali Shah (Note: Filed nomination papers as PTI candidate but ECP allowed him to run as an Independent)	1,525	2.12	
TLP	Ghulam Shabeer	1,220	1.70	
JUI (F)	Attaullah	1,116	1.55	
JI	Ali Mardan Shah	742	1.03	
Others	Others (twelve candidates)	3,054	4.26	
Turnout		75,316	46.09	
Total valid votes		71,802	95.33	
Rejected ballots		3,514	4.67	
Majority		15,553	21.66	
Registered electors		163,422		
PPP hold				

== General elections 2018 ==
Provincial election 2018: PS-74 Badin-V
Party	Candidate	Votes	%	±%
PPP	Muhammad Ismail Rahoo	44,956	57.19	
GDA	Zulfiqar Ali Mirza	28,895	36.76	
MMA	Syed Daud Shah	1,692	2.15	
Independent	Imran Shah	1,098	1.40	
AAT	Sanam	468	0.60	
Independent	Dr. Fehmida Mirza	425	0.54	
Independent	Fayaz	391	0.50	
Independent	Sajjad Ali	380	0.48	
Independent	Muhammad Aslam Rahoo	226	0.29	
Independent	Abdul Jabbar	50	0.06	
Independent	Khalil Ur Rehman	21	0.03	
Majority		16,061	20.43	
Valid ballots		78,602		
Rejected ballots		4,434		
Turnout		83,036		
Registered electors		143,566		
hold				

== General elections 2013 ==
Contesting candidates	Party affiliation	Votes polled

== General elections 2008 ==
Contesting candidates	Party affiliation	Votes polled

== See also ==
- PS-71 Badin-IV
- PS-73 Sujawal-I
