= Sardar Arbab Ameer Amanullah Khan =

Member of the Provincial Assembly of Sindh from Badin (2024–2029)

- سردار ارباب امير امانُ ﷲ

Member of the Provincial Assembly of Sindh
- Incumbent
- Assumed office 25 February 2025
- Constituency: PS-70 Badin-III

Personal details
- Party: PPP (2024-present)
- Relations: Arbab Lutfullah (Brother) Arbab Ghulam Rahim (uncle)

Sardar Arbab Ameer Amanullah (Sindhi: سردار ارباب امير امانُ ﷲUrdu: سردار ارباب امیر امانُ ﷲ خان) is a Pakistani politician and member of the Provincial Assembly of Sindh.

== Political career ==
Khan won the 2024 Sindh provincial election from PS-70 Badin-III as a Pakistan People’s Party candidate. He received 44,126 votes while runner up Hasnain Mirza of Grand Democratic Alliance received 36,861 votes.
