= Qazi Abdul Majeed Abid =

Pakistani politician and journalist from Hyderabad, Sindh

- Born: 2 March 1915; Hyderabad, Sindh, Pakistan
- Died: 27 August 1996 (aged 81); Hyderabad, Sindh, Pakistan
- Cause of death: Lung cancer
- Children: Fahmida Mirza (daughter)
- Relatives: Hasnain Mirza (grandson); Zulfiqar Mirza (nephew, through sister)

Qazi Abdul Majeed Abid (Sindhi: قاضي عبدالمجيد عابد; Urdu: قاضی عبد المجید عابد; 2 March 1915 – 27 August 1996) was a Pakistani politician and journalist from Hyderabad, Sindh. He served as a member of the National Assembly of Pakistan and held several portfolios in the federal cabinet under multiple prime ministers, including Federal Minister for Information and Broadcasting, Federal Minister for Education, Federal Minister for Food and Agriculture, and Federal Minister for Water and Power. He was the founder and publisher of Daily Ibrat, a Sindhi-language newspaper. He died of lung cancer on 27 August 1996.

== Early life and family ==
Qazi Abdul Majeed Abid was born on 2 March 1915 in Hyderabad, Sindh. His father, Qazi Abdul Qayyum, served as the first Muslim president of the Hyderabad Municipality. He had a brother, Qazi Muhammad Akbar (known as Qazi Akbar), and a sister, Afroze Begum, who married Zafar Hussain Mirza, the father of Zulfiqar Mirza.

Qazi Abid and his brother Qazi Akbar are regarded by some as the patriarchs of the Qazis of Hyderabad. Qazi Akbar served as a long-standing provincial minister in Sindh, including as Home Minister.

== Career ==
=== Politics ===
Qazi Abid served as a member of the National Assembly of Pakistan. During his political career he held multiple federal cabinet portfolios, serving as Federal Minister for Information and Broadcasting, Federal Minister for Education, Federal Minister for Food and Agriculture, and Federal Minister for Water and Power.

=== Journalism ===
Qazi Abid founded and served as publisher of Daily Ibrat, a Sindhi-language newspaper based in Hyderabad. The newspaper continued publication after his death and has been published by his son Qazi Asad Abid. In 1985, he received the Writers' Forum Award in recognition of his contributions to journalism.

== Family in public life ==
Several members of Qazi Abid's family have been active in Pakistani politics. His daughter, Fahmida Mirza, was the first female Speaker of the National Assembly.

== Death ==
Qazi Abdul Majeed Abid died on 27 August 1996 in Hyderabad, following a period of illness from lung cancer.
