= Mirza Qaleech Baig =

Sindhi literature scholar

Mirza Kalich Baig مرزا قليچ بیگ
- Born: 4 October 1853; Tando Thoro, Hyderabad, Bombay Presidency, British India (now in Pakistan)
- Died: 3 July 1929 (aged 75); Buland Shah, Tando Thoro

Mirza Qaleech Baig (Sindhi: مرزا قليچ بيگ), also Kalich Baig/Beg (1853–1929), was a Sindhi scholar active in English and Sindhi literature.

== Background ==
According to his autobiography, his father Fredunbeg was a Georgian born in Tbilisi who was enslaved during conflicts with the Qajar dynasty, later being gifted by Qajar rulers to the Talpur emirs of Sindh at the age of ten. Qaleech Beg was born on 4 October 1853 in Tando Thoro on the bank of Phuleli Canal in Hyderabad, British India in what is now Sindh, Pakistan. The background of the Mirza family and their Georgian connections are a subject of the 2005 book A Georgian Saga: From the Caucasus to the Indus by the family's scion Meherafroze Mirza Habib, vice-president of All Pakistan Women's Association.

== Works ==
He wrote 457 books in 43 disciplines, "including chemistry, physics, biology, zoology, plant sciences, Sindhi literature and anthropology" in eight languages, including Sindhi, Persian, Arabic and English, while he knew 25 languages.

Mirza Kalich's books include:

- Maqalat-ul-Hikmat
- Khoodyari
- Alamat-ul-Quran (Signs of Quran)
- Bagh ae Bayani
- Hashrat-ul-Arz
- Zameen pokhin jo ilm ae Hunr
- Keemya-e-Saaat
- Dilaram
- Zeenat (novel)
- Sao Pan Karo Pano (autobiography)
