= Zulfiqar Mirza =

Pakistani politician

Zulfiqar Ali Mirza
- ذوالفقار مرزا

Home Minister of Sindh
- In Minister Role; 2009 – June 2011

Personal details
- Born: 12 January 1954 (age 72) Hyderabad, Sindh, Pakistan
- Party: GDA (2017-present)
- Spouse: Fahmida Mirza
- Parent: Zafar Hussain Mirza (father)
- Education: Liaquat University of Medical and Health Sciences
- Occupation: Politician; Agriculturist; Doctor; Industrialist
- Website: zulfiqarmirza

Zulfiqar Mirza (Sindhi: ذوالفقار مرزا; Urdu: ذوالفقار مرزا) is a Pakistani politician who is currently affiliated with the Grand Democratic Alliance (GDA). He is from Badin District, Sindh, Pakistan.

== Early life and education ==
He acquired his early education from Cadet College Petaro, and then 1 year Muslim College Hyderabad Sindh and 2 Year Federal College Cantt Hyderabad, and completed his MBBS from Liaquat University of Medical and Health Sciences in 1980.

He enlisted in the Pakistan Army Medical Corps as a captain. He received his training from the Pakistan Military Academy, and later joined Pakistan Navy.He was discharged from the armed forces in 1985 for refusing to vote in the 1984 Pakistani Islamisation programme referendum. Till 1989, he worked for the Pakistan International Airlines.

Mirza arrived in Badin in the early 1980s for business purposes. He set up his Sugarcane mill sugar mill in 1989 there with the help of his childhood friend Asif Ali Zardari, who was the husband of the then Prime Minister of Pakistan Prime Minister Benazir Bhutto, after which he decided to settle in the area.

== Career ==
He contested the 1993 Pakistani general election and became a Member of the National Assembly after defeating Murtaza Bhutto from the NA-172 Badin-II (now NA-230 Badin-II) constituency. His influence helped Pakistan Peoples Party to win several elections from Badin over the next several years. He served as the Parliamentary Secretary Commerce, and was a member of the Kashmir Committee, Overseas Pakistan Foundation, the accountability committee, and the International Medical Parliamentarians Association. He also served as the director of the Pakistan Medical and Dental Council.

Due to several cases against him, he spent 12 years away from the public eye during which his wife, Fahmida Mirza, took over his political career in Badin, winning National Assembly seats in 1997, 2002, and 2008.

Mirza was the Home Minister of Sindh as part of the Pakistan Peoples Party provincial government till June 2011, when he resigned.

Mirza was assigned the portfolio of Jails and Prisons, as well as the portfolio of Senior Minister for Works, Services and Forest in the Sindh cabinet. He remained a member of the Provincial Assembly of Sindh, and a member of the PPP Central Executive Committee, and Vice President of PPP (Sindh) till 28 August 2011. He was suspended from the committee in 2015.

He is also a member of the board of directors of Mirza Sugar Mills located in Badin District, Sindh.

=== Allegations against MQM ===
In November 2011, Mirza left for London carrying documents he claimed contained evidence against Altaf Hussain and the Muttahida Qaumi Movement (MQM) with regards the murder of Imran Farooq. Mirza presented the evidence to the Scotland Yard on 17 November 2011.

=== Fight against corruption ===
Zulfiqar Mirza has said that the political gathering of the Imran Khan led Pakistan Tehreek-e-Insaf was an indicator of change in Pakistan and thousands of PPP workers, loyal to Benazir Bhutto and Zulfikar Ali Bhutto, along with Shah Mahmood Qureshi would come out on the streets for a change too. Mirza said that he was still a PPP worker and vowed to fight against corrupt ministers and cliques in the party. However, Mirza's wife, Fahmida Mirza has also been declared a loan defaulter by the State Bank of Pakistan.

== Personal life ==
Zulfiqar married Fahmida Mirza in 1982, who was elected as the first female Speaker of the National Assembly of Pakistan on 19 March 2008. She is also the first female parliamentary speaker in the Muslim world. He has two sons and two daughters. He is the father of Member of National Assembly, Hasnain Mirza.

== See also ==
- List of Pakistanis
