= PS-54 Tharparkar-III =

Constituency of the Provincial Assembly of Sindh, Pakistan

- Constituency for the Provincial Assembly of Sindh
- Region: Islamkot Tehsil, Mithi Tehsil (partly) and Chachro Tehsil (partly) of Tharparkar District
- Electorate: 194,955

Current constituency
- Member: Vacant
- Created from: PS-61 Tharparkar-II (2002-2018); PS-56 Tharparkar-III (2018-2023)

PS-54 Tharparkar-III (پی ایس-54، تھرپارکر-3) is a constituency of the Provincial Assembly of Sindh.

== General elections 2024 ==
Provincial election 2024: PS-54 Tharparkar-III
Party	Candidate	Votes	%	±%
PPP	Fakeer Sher Muhammad Bilalani	70,272	54.48	
GDA	Arbab Togachi Fawad Razaque	34,469	26.72	
PTI	Lajpat Rai (Note: Filed nomination papers as PTI candidate but ECP allowed him to run as an Independent)	16,106	12.49	
Independent	Khair Muhammad	2,693	2.09	
Others	Others (seven candidates)	5,451	4.22	
Turnout		134,916	69.20	
Total valid votes		128,991	95.61	
Rejected ballots		5,925	4.39	
Majority		35,803	27.76	
Registered electors		194,955		
PPP hold				

== General elections 2018 ==
Provincial election 2018: PS-56 Tharparkar-III
Party	Candidate	Votes	%	±%
PPP	Faqir Sher Muhammad Bilalani	55,160	51.78	
GDA	Arbab Togachi Fawad Razzak	33,369	31.32	
Independent	Lajpat Rai S/O Ghaman Singh	12,351	11.59	
Independent	Dileep Kumar	1,445	1.36	
MMA	Mir Muhammad	819	0.77	
Independent	Arbab Zakaullah	687	0.64	
Independent	Faqeer Faiz Muhammad Bilalani	563	0.53	
Independent	Lajpat Rai S/O Kanji Mal	552	0.52	
TLP	Abdul Karim	445	0.42	
Independent	Irshad Ali	368	0.35	
Independent	Sunita Bai	353	0.33	
Independent	Pardeep Meghwar	102	0.10	
Independent	Ghulam Mustafa	78	0.07	
Independent	Manoj Kumar Malani	76	0.07	
Independent	Muhabatoo	50	0.05	
Independent	Roshan Ali	36	0.03	
Independent	Khenpal Das	28	0.03	
Independent	Mohan Manjiani	27	0.03	
Independent	Lajpat Rai S/O Kalji Mal	23	0.02	
Majority		21,791	20.46	
Valid ballots		106,532		
Rejected ballots		5,932		
Turnout		112,464		
Registered electors		152,150		
hold				

== General elections 2013 ==
Contesting candidates	Party affiliation	Votes polled

== General elections 2008 ==
Contesting candidates	Party affiliation	Votes polled

== See also ==
- PS-53 Tharparkar-II
- PS-55 Tharparkar-IV
