= Dost Muhammad Rahimoon =

Pakistani politician

- دوست محمد راھمون

Member of the Provincial Assembly of Sindh
- In office 29 May 2013 – 28 May 2018
- Constituency: PS-63
- Incumbent
- Assumed office 24 February 2024
- Constituency: PS-52

Personal details
- Born: 1 February 1976 (age 50) Chachro Tehsil, Sindh, Pakistan
- Party: PPP (2008-present)

Dost Muhammad Rahimoon (Sindhi: دوست محمد راھمون;born 1 February 1976) is son of Jumoon Khan Rahimoon and Nephew of ex-minister Inaulyatullah Rahimoon. He is a Pakistani politician who had been a Member of the Provincial Assembly of Sindh, from 2013 to 2018 and 2024 till date. Currently he is serving as Advisor to Chief Minister Sindh for Environment, Climate Change & Coastal Development Department.

== Early life and education ==
He was born on 1 February 1976 in Chachro.

He is from a village near Umerkot (70 km away) Namely "Mehran Vero".

He has graduated from Degree College in Umerkot.

== Political career ==
He ran for the seat of the Provincial Assembly of Sindh as a candidate of Pakistan Peoples Party (PPP) from Constituency PS-63 (Tharparkar-IV) in the 2008 Pakistani general election but was unsuccessful. He received 19,771 votes and lost the seat to Abdul Razzaque Rahimoon.

He was elected to the Provincial Assembly of Sindh as a candidate of PPP from Constituency PS-63 (Tharparkar-IV) in the 2013 Pakistani general election. He received 29,072 votes and defeated Ghulam Hyder Samejo.

He ran for the seat of the Provincial Assembly of Sindh as a candidate of Pakistan Peoples Party (PPP) from Constituency PS-54 (Tharparkar-I) in the 2018 Pakistani general election but was unsuccessful. He received 24,844 votes and lost the seat to Abdul Razzaque Rahimoon.

He was elected to the Provincial Assembly of Sindh as a candidate of PPP from Constituency PS-52 (Tharparkar-I) in the 2023 Pakistani general election He received 70,429 and defeated Sher Khan
