= Fahmida Mirza =

Pakistani politician

- فہمیدہ مرزا
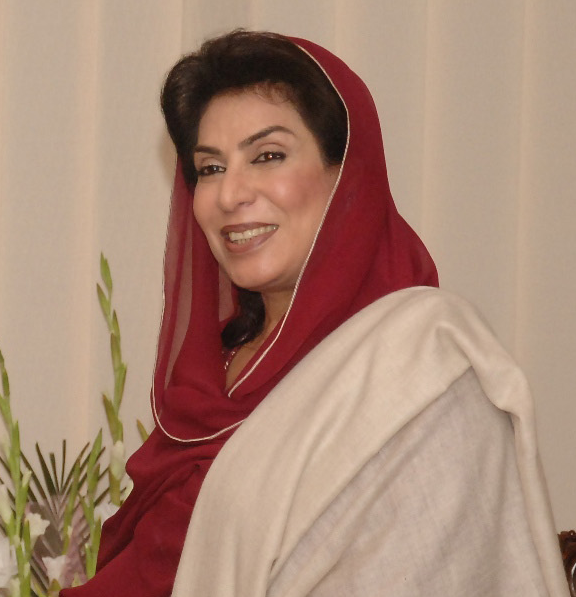
- Mirza in 2012

Federal Minister for Inter Provincial Coordination
- In office 20 August 2018 – 10 April 2022
- President: Arif Alvi
- Prime Minister: Imran Khan
- Preceded by: Muhammad Azam Khan (caretaker)

16th Speaker of the National Assembly of Pakistan
- In office 19 March 2008 – 3 June 2013
- Deputy: Faisal Karim Kundi
- Preceded by: Chaudhry Amir Hussain
- Succeeded by: Ayaz Sadiq

Member of the National Assembly of Pakistan
- In office 13 August 2018 – 10 August 2023
- Constituency: NA-230 (Badin-II)
- In office 1 June 2013 – 31 May 2018
- Constituency: NA-225 (Badin-II)
- In office 17 March 2008 – 16 March 2013
- Constituency: NA-225 (Badin-II)
- In office 16 November 2002 – 15 November 2007
- Constituency: NA-225 (Badin-II)
- In office 14 February 1997 – 12 October 1999
- Constituency: NA-173 (Badin-II)

Personal details
- Born: 20 December 1956 (age 69) Karachi, Pakistan
- Spouse: Zulfiqar Mirza
- Relations: Zafar Hussain Mirza (father-in-law) Ali Kazi (cousin)
- Children: Hasnain Mirza (son)
- Parent: Qazi Abdul Majeed Abid (father)
- Education: Liaquat Medical College

Fahmida Mirza (Urdu: فہمیدہ مرزا; Sindhi: فهميده مرزا; born 20 December 1956) is a Pakistani politician. She served as the 16th Speaker of the National Assembly of Pakistan from 19 March 2008 to 3 June 2013, becoming the first woman to hold that office. She subsequently served as Federal Minister for Inter Provincial Coordination from 20 August 2018 to 10 April 2022 in the cabinet of Prime Minister Imran Khan. She has been a member of the National Assembly of Pakistan across five terms: 1997 to 1999, 2002 to 2007, 2008 to 2013, 2013 to 2018, and 2018 to 2023.

== Early life and education ==
Mirza was born on 20 December 1956 in Karachi. She is the daughter of Qazi Abdul Majeed Abid, a politician and journalist from Hyderabad.

Mirza completed her schooling at St Mary's Convent in Hyderabad in 1972. She obtained her MBBS degree from Liaquat Medical College in Jamshoro in 1982. She also worked as chief executive of a Karachi-based advertising company and as chief executive officer of Mirza Sugar Mills.

== Political career ==
=== Pakistan Peoples Party (1997 to 2018) ===
Mirza joined the Pakistan Peoples Party (PPP) in 1997 and was elected to the National Assembly of Pakistan from constituency NA-173 (Badin-II) in the 1997 Pakistani general election.

She was re-elected from constituency NA-225 (Badin-II) in the 2002 Pakistani general election, receiving 71,537 votes and defeating Khan Mohammad Halipota of the Pakistan Muslim League (Q) (PML-Q).

She was re-elected from constituency NA-225 (Badin-cum-Tando Muhammad Khan-II) in the 2008 Pakistani general election, receiving 88,983 votes and defeating Bibi Yasmeen Shah of PML-Q.

=== Speaker of the National Assembly (2008 to 2013) ===
On 19 March 2008, Mirza was elected the 18th Speaker of the National Assembly, the first woman to hold the position. She received 249 votes, defeating Muhammad Israr Tareen, who secured 70 votes.

=== Return to National Assembly (2013 to 2018) ===
Mirza was re-elected from constituency NA-225 (Badin-cum-Tando Muhammad Khan-II) in the 2013 Pakistani general election, receiving 110,738 votes and defeating Bibi Yasmeen Shah of the Pakistan Muslim League (F) (PML-F).

=== Departure from PPP and Grand Democratic Alliance (2018) ===
In May 2018, Mirza resigned from the PPP, stating that the party's government had caused deteriorating conditions in Sindh and had ignored the people of Badin. In June 2018, she joined the Grand Democratic Alliance (GDA).

Also in June 2018, both Mirza and her husband Zulfiqar Mirza were declared loan defaulters by the State Bank of Pakistan.

Mirza was re-elected to the National Assembly from constituency NA-230 (Badin-II) as a GDA candidate in the 2018 Pakistani general election.

=== Federal Minister for Inter Provincial Coordination (2018 to 2022) ===
On 18 August 2018, Prime Minister Imran Khan announced his federal cabinet, in which Mirza was named Federal Minister for Inter Provincial Coordination. She was sworn in on 20 August 2018. She held the portfolio until 10 April 2022.

== Personal life ==
Mirza is married to Zulfiqar Mirza. She has two sons and two daughters.

Political offices
Preceded by Chaudhry Amir Hussain	Speaker of the National Assembly; 2008–2013	Succeeded by Sardar Ayaz Sadiq
