= Arbab Lutfullah =

Pakistani politician

Member of the Provincial Assembly of Sindh
- In office 13 August 2018 – 11 August 2023
- Constituency: PS-57 Tharparkar-IV

Personal details
- Party: PPP (2018-present)
- Relations: Arbab Ghulam Rahim (uncle) Arbab Amir Hassan (father) Sardar Arbab Ameer Amanullah Khan(brother)

Arbab Lutfullah (Sindhi: ارباب لطف الله) is a Pakistani politician who had been a member of the Provincial Assembly of Sindh from August 2018 till August 2023, representing Tharparkar.

He had been the special assistant to CM Sindh on sports from 2021 to August 2023.

He was elected MPA again from the same constituency on 8 February 2024.

== Political career ==
He was elected to the Provincial Assembly of Sindh as a candidate of Pakistan Peoples Party from Constituency PS-57 (Tharparkar-IV) in the 2018 Pakistani general election.
