= Nawab Muhammad Taimur Talpur =

Pakistani politician

Member of the Provincial Assembly of Sindh
- In office 13 August 2018 – 11 August 2023
- Constituency: PS-51 Umerkot-III
- In office May 2008 – 28 May 2018

Personal details
- Born: 25 July 1973 (age 53) Umerkot, Sindh, Pakistan
- Party: PPP (2013-present)
- Parents: Nawab Yousuf Talpur (father); Saba Talpur (mother)

Nawab Muhammad Taimur Talpur is a Pakistani politician and stalwart member of the Pakistan People's Party. He is the son of the senior politician (late) Nawab Yousuf Talpur and is currently a member of the Provincial Assembly of Sindh, elected for the fourth consecutive time as MPA from his constituency PS-51 Umerkot III. He also served as the Provincial Minister for Information, Science and Technology from 2018 to 2023. Talpur completed his higher education from London, England, in 2001.

== Early life and education ==
He was born on 25 July 1979 in Karachi.

He has a degree of Bachelor of Business Administration and a degree of Master of Business Administration in International Management.

== Political career ==
He was elected to the Provincial Assembly of Sindh as a candidate of Pakistan Peoples Party (PPP) from Constituency PS-68 UMERKOT-I in the 2013 Pakistani general election.

He was re-elected to Provincial Assembly of Sindh as a candidate of PPP from Constituency PS-53 (Umerkot-III) in the 2018 Pakistani general election.

On 15 October 2018, he was inducted into the provincial Sindh cabinet of Chief Minister Syed Murad Ali Shah and was appointed as Provincial Minister of Sindh for information science and technology with the additional ministerial portfolio of environment climate change and coastal development.
