= PS-51 Umerkot-III =

Constituency of the Provincial Assembly of Sindh, Pakistan

- Constituency for the Provincial Assembly of Sindh
- Region: Kunri Tehsil and Umerkot Tehsil (partly) of Umerkot District
- Electorate: 589,350

Current constituency
- Member: Nawab Muhammad Taimur Talpur
- Created from: PS-68 Mirpurkhas-V (2002-2018); PS-53 Umerkot-III (2018-2023)

PS-51 Umerkot-III (پی ایس-51، عمرکوٹ-3) is a constituency of the Provincial Assembly of Sindh.

== General elections 2024 ==
Provincial election 2024: PS-51 Umerkot-III
| Party | Candidate | Votes | % | ±% |
|---|---|---|---|---|
| PPP | Nawab Muhammad Taimur Talpur | 60,518 | 63.26 | |
| GDA | Dost Muhammad | 27,752 | 29.01 | |
| PML(N) | Farzana | 2,663 | 2.78 | |
| Others | Others (seven candidates) | 4,738 | 4.95 | |
| Turnout | | 101,047 | 48.77 | |
| Total valid votes | | 95,671 | 94.68 | |
| Rejected ballots | | 5,376 | 5.32 | |
| Majority | | 32,766 | 34.25 | |
| Registered electors | | 207,189 | | |
| PPP hold | | | | |

== General elections 2018 ==
Provincial election 2018: PS-53 Umerkot-III
| Party | Candidate | Votes | % | ±% |
|---|---|---|---|---|
| PPP | Muhammad Taimur Talpur | 55,351 | 59.93 | |
| PTI | Dost Muhammad | 31,689 | 34.31 | |
| PML(N) | Mir Amanullah Khan Talpur | 3,387 | 3.67 | |
| Independent | Mool Chand | 667 | 0.72 | |
| Independent | Muhammad Jam | 378 | 0.41 | |
| TLP | Gulzar Ali | 203 | 0.22 | |
| Independent | Ashok Parmar | 198 | 0.21 | |
| Independent | Muhammad Younis Talpur | 127 | 0.14 | |
| Independent | Muhammad Bux | 103 | 0.11 | |
| MMA | Salma | 56 | 0.06 | |
| PSP | Muhammad Farhan Khan | 47 | 0.05 | |
| Independent | Gul Zaman | 42 | 0.05 | |
| Amun Taraqqi Party | Bushra | 30 | 0.03 | |
| Independent | Babar Hayat Baloch | 24 | 0.03 | |
| SUP | Muhammad Raheem | 24 | 0.03 | |
| Independent | Mir Ghazanfar Ali Talpur | 15 | 0.02 | |
| Independent | Abdul Haq | 14 | 0.02 | |
| Independent | Mir Muzafar Talpur | 10 | 0.01 | |
| Majority | | 23,662 | 25.62 | |
| Valid ballots | | 92,365 | | |
| Rejected ballots | | 3,782 | | |
| Turnout | | 96,147 | | |
| Registered electors | | 153,545 | | |
| hold | | | | |

== General elections 2013 ==
| Contesting candidates | Party affiliation | Votes polled |

== General elections 2008 ==
| Contesting candidates | Party affiliation | Votes polled |

== See also ==
- PS-50 Umerkot-II
- PS-52 Tharparkar-I
