= Abdul Razzaque Rahimoon =

Pakistani politician

- عبدالرزاق رحيمون

Member of the Provincial Assembly of Sindh
- Constituency: PS-63 Tharparkar-IV
- In office 10 October 2002 – 15 November 2007
- In office 18 February 2008 – 2013
- Constituency: PS-63 Tharparkar-IV
- In office 13 August 2018 – 11 August 2023
- Constituency: PS-54 Tharparkar-I

Personal details
- Party: GDA (2018-present)

Abdul Razzaque Rahimoon (Sindhi: عبدالرزاق رحيمون) is a Pakistani politician who had been a member of the Provincial Assembly of Sindh from August 2018 till August 2023 and represented Tharparkar.

== Political career ==
He was elected to the Provincial Assembly of Sindh as a candidate of National Alliance from Constituency PS-63 (Tharparkar-IV) in the 2002 Pakistani general election. He received 31,015 votes and defeated Muhammad Iqbal Rahimoon, a candidate of Pakistan Peoples Party (PPP).

He was re-elected to the Provincial Assembly of Sindh as a candidate of Pakistan Muslim League (Q) (PML-Q) from Constituency PS-63 (Tharparkar-IV) in the 2008 Pakistani general election. He received 65,151 votes and defeated Dost Muhammad Rahimoon.

He was re-elected to the Provincial Assembly of Sindh as a candidate of Grand Democratic Alliance (GDA) from Constituency PS-54 (Tharparkar-I) in the 2018 Pakistani general election.
