= PS-53 Tharparkar-II =

Constituency of the Provincial Assembly of Sindh, Pakistan

- Constituency for the Provincial Assembly of Sindh
- Region: Nagarparkar Tehsil, Chachro Tehsil (partly) of Tharparkar District
- Electorate: 187,493

Current constituency
- Member: Vacant
- Created from: PS-62 Tharparkar-III (2002-2018); PS-55 Tharparkar-II (2018-2023)

PS-53 Tharparkar-II (پی ایس-53، تھرپارکر-2) is a constituency of the Provincial Assembly of Sindh.

== General elections 2024 ==
Provincial election 2024: PS-53 Tharparkar-II
| Party | Candidate | Votes | % | ±% |
|---|---|---|---|---|
| PPP | Muhammad Qasim Soomro | 74,982 | 61.89 | |
| GDA | Arbab Anwar Jabbar | 41,320 | 34.11 | |
| Others | Others (twelve candidates) | 4,848 | 4.00 | |
| Turnout | | 127,429 | 67.96 | |
| Total valid votes | | 121,150 | 95.07 | |
| Rejected ballots | | 6,279 | 4.93 | |
| Majority | | 33,662 | 27.78 | |
| Registered electors | | 187,493 | | |
| PPP hold | | | | |

== General elections 2018 ==
Provincial election 2018: PS-55 Tharparkar-II
| Party | Candidate | Votes | % | ±% |
|---|---|---|---|---|
| PPP | Muhammad Qasim | 47,344 | 51.20 | |
| GDA | Arbab Anwar Jabbar | 33,215 | 35.92 | |
| Independent | Abdul Ghani Khan Fateh Ali | 9,835 | 10.64 | |
| Independent | Sikandar Ali | 991 | 1.07 | |
| Independent | Bhooro Lal | 389 | 0.42 | |
| Independent | Dheengo | 176 | 0.19 | |
| Independent | Pir Noor Muhammad Shah Jeelani | 138 | 0.15 | |
| Independent | Qambar Khan | 95 | 0.10 | |
| Independent | Ali Akber | 93 | 0.10 | |
| Independent | Imran Khan | 59 | 0.06 | |
| Independent | Sardar Khan | 33 | 0.04 | |
| Independent | Farooq Sattar | 30 | 0.03 | |
| Independent | Nazia Anjum | 25 | 0.03 | |
| Independent | Mubarak | 21 | 0.02 | |
| Independent | Lajpat Rai S/O Kanji Mal | 16 | 0.02 | |
| Independent | Zulfiqar Ali Samejo | 9 | 0.01 | |
| Independent | Muhammad Haroon | 8 | 0.01 | |
| Majority | | 14,129 | 15.28 | |
| Valid ballots | | 92,477 | | |
| Rejected ballots | | 7,348 | | |
| Turnout | | 99,825 | | |
| Registered electors | | 143,308 | | |
| hold | | | | |

== General elections 2013 ==
| Contesting candidates | Party affiliation | Votes polled |

== General elections 2008 ==
| Contesting candidates | Party affiliation | Votes polled |

== See also ==
- PS-52 Tharparkar-I
- PS-54 Tharparkar-III
