= Syed Ameer Ali Shah =

Member of the Provincial Assembly of Sindh from Umarkot (2024–2029)

- سيد امير علي شاھ

Member of the Provincial Assembly of Sindh
- Incumbent
- Assumed office 25 February 2024
- Constituency: PS-50 Umerkot-II

Personal details
- Party: PPP (2024-present)

Syed Ameer Ali Shah (Sindhi: سيد امير علي شاھ; Urdu: سید امیر علی شاہ) is a Pakistani politician who is member of the Provincial Assembly of Sindh.

== Political career ==
Shah won the 2024 Sindh provincial election from PS-50 Umerkot-II as a Pakistan People’s Party candidate. He received 61,386 votes while runner up candidate Ghulam Nabi Mangrio of Grand Democratic Alliance received 15,648 votes.
