= PS-50 Umerkot-II =

Constituency of the Provincial Assembly of Sindh, Pakistan

- Constituency for the Provincial Assembly of Sindh
- Region: Umerkot Tehsil (partly) including Umerkot city of Umerkot District
- Electorate: 172,485

Current constituency
- Member: Vacant
- Created from: PS-70 Mirpurkhas-VII (2002–2018); PS-52 Umerkot-II (2018–2023)

PS-50 Umerkot-II (پی ایس-50، عمرکوٹ-2) is a constituency of the Provincial Assembly of Sindh.

== General elections 2024 ==
Provincial election 2024: PS-55 Tharparkar-IV
Party	Candidate	Votes	%	±%
PPP	Syed Ameer Ali Shah	75,760	64.96	
GDA	Ghulam Nabi	14,743	16.19	
PTI	Lekhraj Mal (Note: Filed nomination papers as PTI candidate but ECP allowed him to run as an independent)	13,712	14.10	
Others	Others (eighteen candidates)	4,616	4.75	
Turnout		101,960	59.11	
Total valid votes		97,227	95.36	
Rejected ballots		4,733	4.64	
Majority		47,409	48.77	
Registered electors		172,484		
PPP hold				

== Byelection 2022 ==
Contesting candidates	Party affiliation	Votes polled
Syed Ameer Ali Shab	PPP	58,968
Arbab Ghulam Raheem	GDA	30,832

The seat fell vacant after Syed Ali Mardan Shah died of a cardiac arrest on January 19, 2019.

== General elections 2018 ==
Provincial election 2018: PS-52 Umerkot-II
Party	Candidate	Votes	%	±%
PPP	Syed Ali Mardan Shah	52,647	60.55	
GDA	Arbab Ghulam Rahim	32,148	36.97	
Independent	Sunderaj	888	1.02	
Independent	Wasdev	253	0.29	
PML(N)	Neelam Walgi	143	0.16	
MMA	Salma	134	0.15	
Independent	Mai Lali	103	0.12	
Independent	Syed Ameer Ali Shah	100	0.12	
Independent	Kishan Chand Parwani	98	0.11	
SUP	Abid Veryamani	93	0.11	
PSP	Prem Chand	74	0.09	
Independent	Farooq Sattar	71	0.08	
Independent	Ghulam Qadir	67	0.08	
Independent	Allah Dad	60	0.07	
Independent	Asghar Ali	46	0.05	
Independent	Samiullah	26	0.03	
Majority		20,499	23.58	
Valid ballots		86,951		
Rejected ballots		5,113		
Turnout		92,064		
Registered electors		138,003		
hold				

== General elections 2013 ==
Contesting candidates	Party affiliation	Votes polled

== General elections 2008 ==
Contesting candidates	Party affiliation	Votes polled

== See also ==
- PS-49 Umerkot-I
- PS-51 Umerkot-III
