= Kishan Chand Parwani =

Pakistani politician

Member of the National Assembly of Pakistan
- In office 2008–2013

Kishan Chand Parwani is a Pakistani politician who served as member of the National Assembly of Pakistan.

== Political career ==
He was elected to National Assembly in the 1988, 1993, and 1997 general elections as an independent candidate from a separate seat for Hindus and scheduled castes. He received 27,296 votes, 29,866 votes, and 33,717 votes, respectively.

He ran for a seat of the National Assembly of Pakistan in the 2002 Pakistani general election from NA-228 Mirpurkhas-III as a candidate of the National Alliance, but was unsuccessful. He received 48,905 votes and was defeated by Nawab Muhammad Yusuf Talpur, a candidate of the Pakistan People's Party (PPP).

He was elected to the National Assembly on a seat reserved for minorities as a candidate of the Pakistan Muslim League (Q) in the 2008 Pakistani general election.

He ran for the seat of the National Assembly in the 2018 Pakistani general election as a candidate of the Grand Democratic Alliance (GDA) from NA-216 Sanghar-II, but was unsuccessful. He received 70,791 votes and was defeated by Shazia Marri, a candidate of the PPP.
