= PS-71 Badin-IV =

Constituency of the Provincial Assembly of Sindh, Pakistan

- Constituency for the Provincial Assembly of Sindh
- Region: Badin Tehsil (partly) including Badin city of Badin District
- Electorate: 192,999

Current constituency
- Member: Vacant
- Created from: PS-58 Badin-IV (2002-2018); PS-73 Badin-IV (2018-2023)

PS-71 Badin-IV (پی ایس-71، بدین-4) is a constituency of the Provincial Assembly of Sindh.

== General elections 2024 ==
Provincial election 2024: PS-72 Badin-V
| Party | Candidate | Votes | % | ±% |
|---|---|---|---|---|
| PPP | Taj Muhammad Mallah | 41,134 | 44.40 | |
| GDA | Muhammad Hassam Mirza | 32,477 | 35.06 | |
| Independent | Kamal Khan Chang | 6,130 | 6.62 | |
| JUI (F) | Muhammad Ismail | 3,474 | 3.75 | |
| PTI | Ashfaq Ahmed (Note: Filed nomination papers as PTI candidate but ECP allowed him to run as an Independent) | 3,037 | 3.28 | |
| TLP | Abdul Rehman Soomro | 1,074 | 1.16 | |
| JI | Allah Bachayo | 969 | 1.05 | |
| Others | Others (fifteen candidates) | 4,346 | 4.68 | |
| Turnout | | 98,482 | 51.03 | |
| Total valid votes | | 92,641 | 94.07 | |
| Rejected ballots | | 5,841 | 5.93 | |
| Majority | | 8,657 | 9.34 | |
| Registered electors | | 192,999 | | |
| PPP hold | | | | |

== General elections 2018 ==
Provincial election 2018: PS-73 Badin-IV
| Party | Candidate | Votes | % | ±% |
|---|---|---|---|---|
| PPP | Taj Muhammad | 37,432 | 46.13 | |
| GDA | Dr. Fehmida Mirza | 36,517 | 45.00 | |
| MMA | Allah Bux Notire | 2,511 | 3.09 | |
| TLP | Pir Muhammad Ali Sarhandi | 2,159 | 2.66 | |
| Independent | Shahab Ul Din Ahmed | 630 | 0.78 | |
| Independent | Muhammad Ibrahim | 512 | 0.63 | |
| PTI | Muhammad Rafique | 505 | 0.62 | |
| Independent | Anwar Ali | 310 | 0.38 | |
| Independent | Muhammad Soomar | 199 | 0.25 | |
| Independent | Naik Muhammad Bhatti | 104 | 0.13 | |
| Independent | Abdul Rehman | 89 | 0.11 | |
| Independent | Muhammad Siddique | 76 | 0.09 | |
| Independent | Allah Bachayo | 47 | 0.06 | |
| Independent | Haji Muhammad Ramzan | 31 | 0.04 | |
| Independent | Gul Muhammad Jakhrani | 23 | 0.03 | |
| Majority | | 915 | 1.13 | |
| Valid ballots | | 81,145 | | |
| Rejected ballots | | 6,020 | | |
| Turnout | | 87,165 | | |
| Registered electors | | 150,195 | | |
| hold | | | | |

== General elections 2013 ==
| Contesting candidates | Party affiliation | Votes polled |

== General elections 2008 ==
| Contesting candidates | Party affiliation | Votes polled |

== See also ==
- PS-70 Badin-III
- PS-72 Badin-V
