= Arbab Ghulam Rahim =

Pakistani politician

- ارباب غلام رحيم

27th Chief Minister of Sindh
- In office 9 June 2004 – 19 November 2007
- Governor: Ishratul Ibad
- Preceded by: Ali Mohammad Mahar
- Succeeded by: Abdul Qadir Halepota (caretaker)
- Constituency: PS-60 (Tharparkar-I)

Special Assistant to the Prime Minister on Sindh Affairs
- In office 28 July 2021 – 10 April 2022
- President: Arif Alvi
- Prime Minister: Imran Khan

Personal details
- Born: 1 January 1957 (age 69) Diplo, Sindh, Pakistan
- Party: GDA (2023-present)
- Other political affiliations: PTI (2021-2023); GDA (2018-2021); PMLN (2013-2018); PML (2009-2013); PML(Q) (2002-2008)
- Relations: Arbab Lutfullah (nephew) Sardar Arbab Ameer Amanullah Khan(nephew)
- Education: Cadet College Petaro; Liaquat University of Medical and Health Sciences; Jinnah Sindh Medical University
- Occupation: Politician, Land Lord

'Arbab' Ghulam Rahim (Sindhi: ارباب غلام رحيمUrdu: ارباب غلام رحیم; born 1 January 1957) is a senior Pakistani politician who served as the Chief Minister of the Government of Sindh from 2004 until 2007.

After that he also served as a special minister to Imran Khan on matters of Sindh from 2021 to the dismissal of Khan's Government.

== Early life ==
Arbab Ghulam Rahim was born in the Diplo Tehsil of Tharparkar District in the Sindh province of Pakistan. Arbab Ghulam Rahim is the youngest of 5 sıblıngs. He was born in a very conservative environment and received his early education ın his village. Then up to 7 grade he studied ın Mirpurkhas, from 8th class he joined the Cadet College Petaro, one of the few reputed ınstıtutıons of the province at that time. After passing out as a House Captain from Cadet College Petaro, he joined Liaquat University of Medical and Health Sciences at Jamshoro to study medicine, but later transferred to Jinnah Sindh Medical University, Karachi. After passing out from Sindh Medıcal College with a MBBS degree, Arbab contested in the local government election and was elected as Nazim ın the Mirpur Khas District.

== Political career ==
He won elections as a Member of National Assembly (MNA) four times, and a number of times as Member of the Provincial Assembly (MPA) from the constituency PS-60 (Tharparkar-I) in Tharparkar District.

Belonging to the Pakistan Muslim League (Q), Arbab was elected to the Sindh Provincial Assembly during the 2002 general elections from PS-60 constituency defeating Engineer Gianchand Meghwar, and was initially inducted as a provincial minister of Sindh for communication. Subsequently, he was elected as the Chief Minister of Sindh in 2004.

After the Pakistan Muslim League (Q) was defeated in the 2008 general elections Arbab Rahim left Pakistan to live in United Arab Emirates in self-imposed exile.

On 27 December 2011, Arbab Ghulam Rahim was first appointed as president of the Pakistan Peoples Muslim League party which was later renamed to Pakistan Peoples Muslim League in 2013.

Arbab Ghulam Rahim returned to Pakistan on 13 March 2013. He merged his Pakistan Peoples Muslim League in Pakistan Muslim League (N) in 2013.

In October 2018, he quit Pakistan Muslim League (N) and joined Grand Democratic Alliance (GDA).

He announced to join Pakistan Tehreek-e-Insaf on 2 July 2021.

On 28 July 2021, he was Special Assistant to the Prime Minister on Sindh Affairs by Imran Khan.

On 30 November 2023, he announced to quit Pakistan Tehreek-e-Insaf.

On 14 December 2023, he rejoined Grand Democratic Alliance.

== Controversies ==
In 2008, he was hit in the head with a shoe thrown by Agha Javed Pathan, a supporter of Benazir Bhutto. Arbab rarely goes to the Provincial Assembly, because he accuses the ruling party of trying to disgrace him in the assembly.

Political offices
Preceded by Ali Mohammad Mahar	Chief Minister of Sindh; 2004–2007	Succeeded by Abdul Qadir Halepoto
