= Tando Thoro =

Coordinates: 25°24′N 68°24′E

Tando Thoro is a suburb of Hyderabad, Sindh, Pakistan. It was formerly a village near Hyderabad city.
