= Lal Chand Malhi =

Pakistani politician

- لال چند
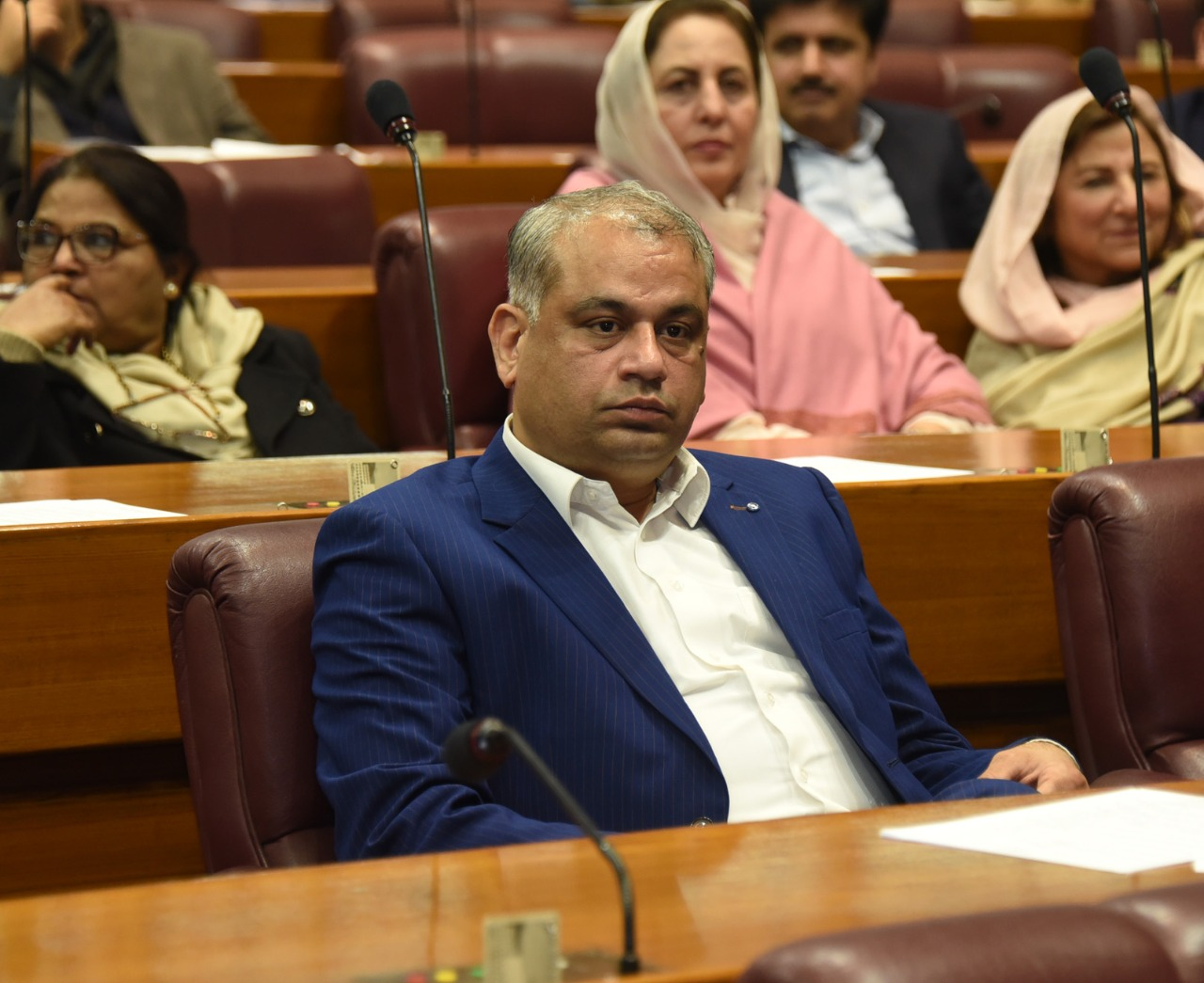

Federal Parliamentary Secretary for Human Rights
- In office 27 September 2018 – 10 April 2022
- Prime Minister: Imran Khan; Shehbaz Sharif

Member of the National Assembly of Pakistan
- In office 13 August 2018 – 25 January 2023
- Constituency: Reserved seat for minorities
- In office 1 June 2013 – 31 May 2018
- Constituency: Reserved seat for minorities

Personal details
- Born: Umerkot, Sindh, Pakistan
- Party: PTI (2013-present)

Lal Chand Malhi (Urdu: لال چند ملہی) is a Pakistani politician who had been a member of the National Assembly of Pakistan, from August 2018 till January 2023. Previously he was a member of the National Assembly from 2013 to May 2018.

== Early life and education ==
He was born on 3 February 1973.

He received his education from Umerkot and Hyderabad. He graduated from the University of Sindh.

== Political career ==
He was elected to the National Assembly as a candidate of Pakistan Tehreek-e-Insaf (PTI) on a seat reserved for minorities in the 2013 Pakistani general election.

He was re-elected to the National Assembly as a candidate of PTI on a reserved seat for minorities in the 2018 Pakistani general election.

On 27 September 2018, Prime Minister Imran Khan appointed him as Federal Parliamentary Secretary for human rights. He has spoken in support of the Shri Krishna Mandir temple in Islamabad. He condemned the 2020 Karak temple attack, where a mob of 1,500 local Muslims led by a local Islamic cleric and the supporters of Jamiat Ulema-e-Islam party attacked and burnt the temple.
