= Pir Noor Muhammad Shah Jeelani =

Pakistani politician (1951–2020)

Member of the National Assembly of Pakistan
- In office 13 August 2018 – 24 December 2020
- Constituency: NA-221 (Tharparkar-I)
- In office 5 June 2013 – 31 May 2018
- Constituency: NA-230 (Tharparkar-II)

Personal details
- Born: 15 September 1951
- Died: 24 December 2020 (aged 69) Karachi, Pakistan
- Party: Pakistan Peoples Party

Pir Noor Muhammad Shah Jeelani (Urdu: پیر نور محمد شاہ جیلانی; born 15 September 1951 – 24 December 2020) was a Pakistani politician who served as a member of the National Assembly of Pakistan, since August 2018 until his death in office representing part of the Tharparkar district in Sindh. Previously he was a member of the National Assembly from June 2013 to May 2018.

== Early life ==
He was born on 15 September 1951.

== Political career ==
He ran for the seat of the National Assembly of Pakistan as a candidate of Pakistan Muslim League (F) (PML-F) from Constituency NA-228 (Umerkot) in the 2008 Pakistani general election but was unsuccessful. He received 24,210 votes and lost the seat to Nawab Muhammad Yousuf.

He was elected to the National Assembly as a candidate of Pakistan Peoples Party (PPP) from Constituency NA-230 (Tharparkar-II) in the 2013 Pakistani general election. He received 61,903 votes and defeated Shah Mehmood Qureshi. In the same election, he ran for the seat of the Provincial Assembly of Sindh as an independent candidate from Constituency PS-62 (Tharparkar-III) but was unsuccessful. He received 0 votes and lost the seat to Makhdoom Khalil-u-Zaman.

He was re-elected to the National Assembly as a candidate of PPP from Constituency NA-221 (Tharparkar-I) in the 2018 Pakistani general election.

== Death ==
He died in Karachi on 24 December 2020, at age 66, from COVID-19, during the COVID-19 pandemic in Pakistan.
