= PS-70 Badin-III =

Constituency of the Provincial Assembly of Sindh, Pakistan

- Constituency for the Provincial Assembly of Sindh
- Region: Badin Tehsil (partly) and Tando Bago Tehsil (partly) of Badin District
- Electorate: 197,321

Current constituency
- Member: Vacant
- Created from: PS-57 Badin-III (2002–2018); PS-72 Badin-III (2018–2023)

PS-70 Badin-III (پی ایس-70، بدین-3) is a constituency of the Provincial Assembly of Sindh.

== General elections 2024 ==
Provincial election 2024: PS-70 Badin-III
Party	Candidate	Votes	%	±%
PPP	Sardar Arbab Ameer Amanullah Khan	44,206	48.57	
GDA	Hasnain Ali Mirza	36,861	40.50	
JUI (F)	Abdul Wahid	2,849	3.13	
Independent	Zulfiqar Ali Mirza	1,595	1.75	
TLP	Muhammad Asif	1,430	1.57	
JI	Abdul Karim	1,055	1.16	
Others	Others (sixteen candidates)	3,017	3.32	
Turnout		97,125	49.22	
Total valid votes		91,013	93.71	
Rejected ballots		6,112	6.29	
Majority		7,345	8.07	
Registered electors		197,321		
PPP hold				

== General elections 2018 ==
Provincial election 2018: PS-72 Badin-III
Party	Candidate	Votes	%	±%
GDA	Hasnain Ali Mirza	43,113	49.84	
PPP	Syed Ali Bux Shah	35,795	41.38	
MMA	Abdul Wahid	4,489	5.19	
TLP	Ghulam Qadir Pathan	1,715	1.98	
Independent	Mirza Saqlain Abbas Baig	880	1.02	
Independent	Sikandar Ali Shah	353	0.41	
Independent	Sain Bux Jamali	150	0.17	
Majority		7,318	8.46	
Valid ballots		86,495		
Rejected ballots		3,765		
Turnout		90,260		
Registered electors		160,770		
hold				

== General elections 2013 ==
Contesting candidates	Party affiliation	Votes polled

== General elections 2008 ==
Contesting candidates	Party affiliation	Votes polled

== See also ==
- PS-69 Badin-II
- PS-71 Badin-IV
