= PS-55 Tharparkar-IV =

Constituency of the Provincial Assembly of Sindh, Pakistan

- Constituency for the Provincial Assembly of Sindh
- Region: Diplo Tehsil, Kaloi Tehsil,Chachro Tehsil (partly) and Mithi Tehsil (partly) including Mithi city in Tharparkar District
- Electorate: 220,154

Current constituency
- Member: Vacant
- Created from: PS-60 Tharparkar-I (2002-2018); PS-57 Tharparkar-IV (2018-2023)

PS-55 Tharparkar-IV (پی ایس-55، تھرپارکر-4) is a constituency of the Provincial Assembly of Sindh.

== General elections 2024 ==
Provincial election 2024: PS-55 Tharparkar-IV
Party	Candidate	Votes	%	±%
PPP	Arbab Lutfullah	108,463	77.82	
GDA	Arbab Zakaullah	17,769	12.75	
Independent	Muhammad Khan	4,035	2.90	
PTI	Manji (Note: Filed nomination papers as PTI candidate but ECP allowed him to run as an Independent)	3,292	2.36	
Others	Others (six candidates)	5,820	4.17	
Turnout		146,049	66.34	
Total valid votes		139,378	95.43	
Rejected ballots		6,671	4.57	
Majority		90,965	65.07	
Registered electors		220,154		
PPP hold				

== General elections 2018 ==
Provincial election 2018: PS-57 Tharparkar-IV
Party	Candidate	Votes	%	±%
PPP	Arbab Lutfullah	65,829	55.92	
GDA	Arbab Ghulam Rahim	44,675	37.95	
Independent	Pardeep Meghwar	2704	2.3	
MMA	Molana Azizullah Sand	1,043	0.89	
Independent	Bharat Kumar Suthar	826	0.70	
TLP	Muharm Ali	710	0.60	
Independent	Sobhraj	418	0.36	
Independent	Keemat Rai	289	0.25	
Independent	Ghansham Malhi	220	0.19	
Independent	Sunita Bai	197	0.17	
Independent	Arbab Zakaullah	170	0.14	
Independent	Haji	148	0.13	
Independent	Kanwar Kumar	117	0.10	
Independent	Arbab Togachi Fawad Razzak	116	0.10	
Independent	Manoj Kumar Malani	93	0.08	
Independent	Gajo	57	0.05	
Independent	Gian Chand	41	0.03	
Independent	Arbab Anwar Jabbar	34	0.03	
Independent	Arbab Amir Amanullah	24	0.02	
Majority		21,154	17.97	
Valid ballots		117,711		
Rejected ballots		6,846		
Turnout		124,557		
Registered electors		179,722		
hold				

== General elections 2013 ==
Contesting candidates	Party affiliation	Votes polled

== General elections 2008 ==
Contesting candidates	Party affiliation	Votes polled

== See also ==
- PS-54 Tharparkar-III
- PS-56 Matiari-I
