= Muhammad Qasim Soomro =

Pakistani politician

Member of the Provincial Assembly of Sindh
- In office 13 August 2018 – 11 August 2023
- Constituency: PS-55 Tharparkar-II

Personal details
- Party: PPP (2019-present)

Muhammad Qasim Soomro (Sindhi: محمد قاسم سومرو) is a Pakistani politician who had been a member of the Provincial Assembly of Sindh from August 2018 till August 2023 and represented Tharparkar.

== Political career ==
He was elected to the Provincial Assembly of Sindh as a candidate of Pakistan Peoples Party from Constituency PS-55 (Tharparkar-II) in the 2018 Pakistani general election.
