= Chachro Tehsil =

Chachro
- Tehsil

- Location within Sindh Location within Pakistan
- Coordinates: 25°6′40″N 70°15′17″E
- Country: Pakistan
- Province: Sindh
- District: Tharparkar
- Time zone: UTC+5 (PST)

Chachro (Sindhi:ڇاڇرو)/(Urdu:چھاچھرو) is the largest tehsil (subdivision) of Tharparkar district in Sindh, Pakistan, by population. It is located in the southeastern part of Pakistan, near the Indian border, inside the Thar Desert. According to the 2023 Census of Pakistan, the population of Chachro tehsil is 371,769, making it the most populated tehsil in Tharparkar.

== History ==
During the Indo-Pakistani war of 1971, the Indian Army captured Chachro during the Chachro Raid. It remained under Indian control for eleven months, and was returned to Pakistan on 22 December 1972 after the Shimla Agreement.

== Geography ==
The Chachro is part of the Thar desert region. The taluka's ground water is highly polluted with arsenic, fluoride and nitrate contamination. The taluka has total area of 4103 sq.km.

== Demographics ==
=== Language ===
Almost all the people in Chachro speak Sindhi (99.8%). The Dhatki language is spoken here.

=== Population growth ===
Census	Population (Chachro Taluka)
1998	167,235
2017	350,807
2023	371,769

Chachro has become the largest tehsil in Tharparkar District. About 93% of the population lives in rural areas. The tehsil has a literacy rate of about 69%.

=== Religion ===
Religions in Chachro tehsil (2023)
Religion	Percent
Islam	64.56%
Hinduism	35.34%
Other or not stated	0.11%

Islam is followed by majority of the tehsil's population with significant Hindu population. The region is known for religious harmony and coexistence between Hindu and Muslim communities.

== See also ==
- Diplo Tehsil
