= List of Pakistani Hindus =

This article contains a list of prominent Hindus from Pakistan.

== Sports ==
- Anil Dalpat, First Hindu cricket player of Pakistan.
- Danish Kaneria, former cricketer.
- Lal Kumar, U-19 cricketer.
- Mohinder Kumar, former cricketer.
- Rajesh Ramesh, former cricketer.
- Anop Santosh, national level cricketer

== Bureaucrats ==
=== Jurists ===
- Rana Bhagwandas, former Chief Justice of the Supreme Court of Pakistan.
- Suman Pawan Bodani, first Hindu woman to be appointed as Civil Judge.

=== Officials ===
- Pushpa Kumari Kohli, first Hindu woman Police Officer in Pakistan
- Manisha Ropeta, first Hindu Woman Deputy Superintendent of Police (DSP) in Pakistan

== Culture ==
- J.C. Anand, film producer and distributor
- Deepak Perwani, actor and Fashion Designer
- Shabnam, Bangladeshi actress (former East Pakistan)

== Politics ==
- Rana Hamir Singh, current Ruler of Umerkot and President of Pakistan Hindu Party.
- Rana Chandra Singh, former Federal Minister of Pakistan and founder of Pakistan Hindu party.
- Tara Chand, former Provincial Minister of Balochistan.
- Mukesh Kumar Chawla, former Minister of Excise And Taxation of Sindh.
- Kamini Kumar Dutta, former Law Minister of Pakistan.
- Amar Lal, Special Adviser in control of Madrasas in Pakistan.
- Ramesh Kumar Vankwani, politician and founder of Pakistan Hindu Council
- Mahesh Kumar Malani, first Hindu to win a General Seat in the National Assembly of Pakistan.
- Ratna Bhagwandas Chawla, first Hindu Woman Senator of Pakistan
- Krishna Kohli, Member of the Senate of Pakistan
- Arjun Das Bugti, Deputy Speaker of Balochistan Provincial Assembly from 1993 to 1996
- Santosh Kumar Bugti – Politician and member of Provincial Assembly of Pakistan from 2013 to 2018
- Chettan Mal Arwani – Reserved seat for non-Muslims in Sindh Provincial Assembly
- Bherulal Balani, politician from Tharparkar
- Canteswar Barman, member of 2nd National Assessment of Pakistan
- Krishan Bheel, politician and member of Pakistani Muslim League
- Gian Chand – Politician and member of senate of Pakistan since 2015
- Lal Chand, former member of Pakistan's Provincial Sindh Assembly
- Lal Chand Malhi – Member of National Assembly of Pakistan from 2018 to 2023
- Bhawan Das – Member of National Assembly of Pakistan from 2008 to 2018
- Heman Dass – Member of Senate of Pakistan
- Sanjay Gangwani – Politician and close associate of former Prime Minister Imran Khan
- Reeta Ishwar – Women Politician and member of National Assembly of Pakistan from 2013 to 2018
- Khatu Mal Jeewan – Member of Senate of Pakistan
- Kishan Chand Parwani – Served as member of National Assembly of Pakistan
- Kheal Das Kohistani – Politician and member of National Assembly of Pakistan from 2018 to 2023
- Danesh Kumar – Member of Provincial Assembly of Balochistan
- Hari Ram – Politician and 5 Time legislature from Sindh Assembly
- Ramesh Lal – Member of National Assembly of Pakistan
- Manwer Lal – Member of National Assembly of Pakistan
- Sham Lal (politician) – Member of Provincial Assembly of Balochistan
- Sanjay Perwani – Member of Provincial Assembly of Sindh
- Darshan Punshi – Member of National Assembly of Pakistan
- Jai Parkash Ukrani – Member of National Assembly of Pakistan
- Mangla Sharma – Member of Provincial Assembly of Sindh
- Ram Singh Sodho – Former member of Sindh Provincial Assembly
- Seth Sukhdev – Member of Constituent Assembly of Pakistan after Independence
- Prem Hari Barma – Bengali Politician
- Raj Kumar Chakraverty – Bengali Politician
- Sris Chandra Chattopadhyaya – Member of First National Assembly of Pakistan
- Akshay Kumar Das – Bengali Hindu Politician
- Basanta Kumar Das – Member of Second National Assembly of Pakistan
- Jnanendra Chandra Majumdar – Representative in constituent Assembly of Pakistan
- Birat Chandra Mandal – member of 1st National Assembly of Pakistan
- Rasaraj Mandal – member of 2nd National Assembly of Pakistan
- Bhabesh Chandra Nandi – Representative in constituent Assembly of Pakistan
- Dhananjoy Roy – Member of 1st National Assembly of Pakistan
- Sailendra Kumar Sen – Member of 2nd National Assembly of Pakistan
- Harendra Kumar Sur – Member of Constituent Assembly of Pakistan

== Army ==
- Ashok Kumar (soldier)- Martyr

== Others ==
- Sunny Balwani – Businessman
- Fakeero Solanki – Sculptor
- Surendar Valasai – Journalist
- Sobho Gianchandani – Writer and Scientist
- Hindu Singh Sodha – Pakistani Hindu Refuge Worker
- Veeru Kohli – Human Rights Activist
- Bhawani Shankar Chowdhry – ICT and National award winner
- Manu Bheel former bonded laborer and human rights activist from Sindh
