= Hinduism in Sindh =

Overview of Hinduism in the Sindh province of Pakistan

Hindus in Sindh
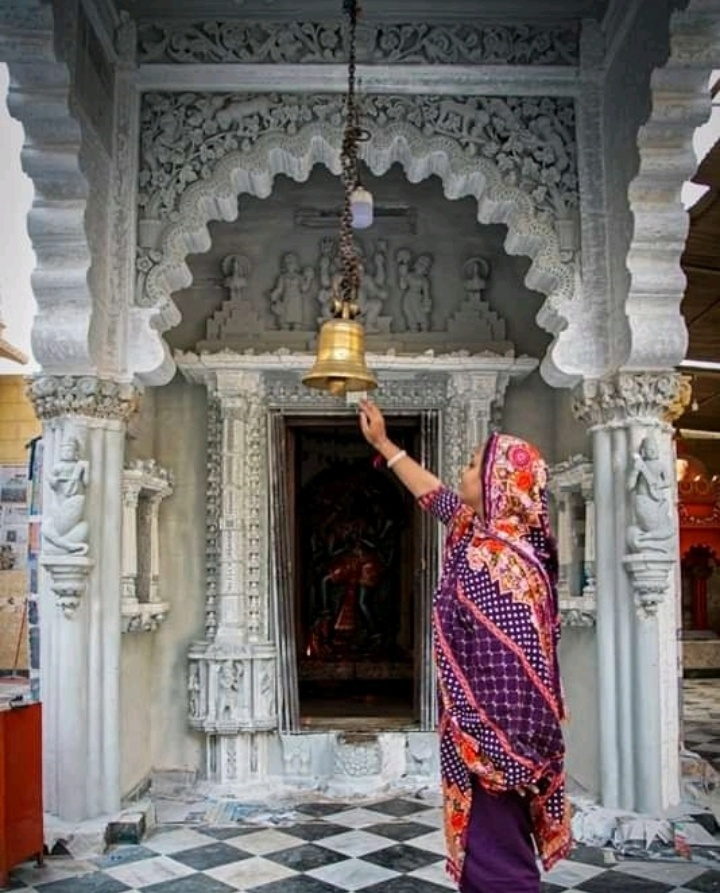
- Devotee at Karachi's Panchmukhi Hanuman Temple

Total population
- ▲4,901,407 (2023) ▲8.81% of the Sindh population

Scriptures
- Bhagavad Gita, Vedas

Languages
- Sanskrit (sacred); Sindhi, Dhatki (majority); Urdu and other languages (minority)

Hinduism is the second-largest religion in Sindh, numbering 4.9 million people and comprising 8.8 percent of the province's population in the 2023 Pakistani census. Sindh has the largest population and the highest percentage of Hindus in Pakistan. Sindh has the Shri Ramapir Temple, whose annual festival is the country's second-largest Hindu festival (after the Hinglaj Yatra).

== History ==
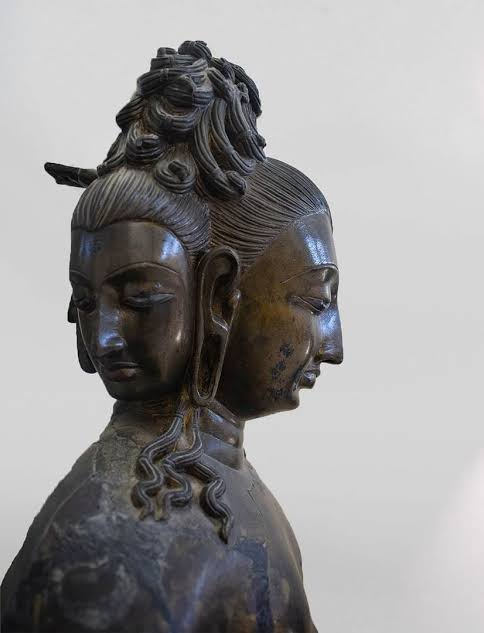
Excavation of a Brahma bronze from Mirpur Khas

The region and its rulers play an important role in the Hindu epic, Mahabharata. Hinduism and Buddhism were the predominant religions in Sindh before the arrival of Islam, when a number of Hindu castes and communities occupied the region. Many ancient Hindu temples still exist; many Hindu dynasties, including the Gupta, Pala, Kushan and Hindu Shahis, ruled the region before Muhammad ibn Qasim led the Umayyad army in the Islamic conquest of Sindh. The region still had a Hindu majority, but repeated campaigns and persecution by the Delhi Sultanate led to a gradual decrease in the Hindu population and an increased number of Muslims. Hindus were a minority in the region at the time of the Mughal Empire. After the formation of Pakistan, most of the remaining Hindus migrated to India.

== Demographics ==
Hinduism in Sindh (1872–2023)
Year	Number	Percent	Increase	Growth	Source(s)
1872	475,848	21.7%	-	-	
1881	544,848	21.43%	-0.27%	+14.50%	
1891	674,371	22.45%	+1.02%	+23.77%	
1901	787,683	23.1%	+0.65%	+16.80%	
1911	877,313	23.47%	+0.37%	+11.38%	
1921	876,629	25.24%	+1.77%	-0.08%	
1931	1,055,119	25.65%	+0.41%	+20.36%	
1941	1,279,530	26.43%	+0.78%	+21.27%	
1951	482,560	7.98%	-18.45%	-62.29%	
1961	568,530	6.64%	-1.34%	+17.82%	
1972	815,452	5.76%	-0.88%	+43.43%	
1981	1,221,961	6.42%	+0.66%	+49.85%	
1998	2,280,842	7.49%	+1.07%	+86.65%	
2017	4,176,986	8.73%	+1.24%	+83.13%	
2023	4,901,407	8.81%	+0.08%	+17.34%	

=== Colonial era ===
Hindus in the administrative divisions that compose the contemporary Sindh region (1872–1941)
District or Princely State	1872		1881		1891		1901		1911		1921		1931		1941	
District or Princely State	Pop.	%	Pop.	%	Pop.	%	Pop.	%	Pop.	%	Pop.	%	Pop.	%	Pop.	%
Hyderabad District	163,222	22.61%	159,515	21.14%	204,785	22.29%	242,692	24.54%	246,008	23.72%	160,211	27.94%	198,684	29.97%	245,849	32.4%
Shikarpur District/ Sukkur District (Note: 1901: District headquarters shifted from Shikarpur to Sukkur, while district bifurcation created Larkana District.)	147,224	18.97%	167,896	19.68%	185,813	20.3%	218,829	21.49%	155,156	27.03%	148,188	29.04%	177,467	28.45%	195,458	28.22%
Tharparkar District	84,112	46.53%	93,094	45.78%	132,468	44.42%	151,726	41.7%	196,793	43.08%	176,026	44.41%	218,850	46.76%	247,496	42.6%
Karachi District	72,513	17.12%	82,860	17.31%	103,589	18.34%	115,240	18.96%	111,748	21.42%	138,485	25.55%	162,111	24.93%	222,597	31.18%
Upper Sind Frontier District	8,777	9.75%	14,756	11.88%	18,816	10.78%	22,765	9.81%	26,495	10.07%	23,855	9.91%	29,174	10%	28,664	9.43%
Khairpur State	—N/a	—N/a	26,727	20.69%	28,900	21.9%	36,431	18.28%	39,426	17.62%	35,362	18.31%	39,894	17.56%	49,604	16.22%
Larkana District	—N/a	—N/a	—N/a	—N/a	—N/a	—N/a	—N/a	—N/a	101,687	15.39%	97,154	16.25%	113,040	16.29%	91,062	17.81%
Nawabshah District	—N/a	—N/a	—N/a	—N/a	—N/a	—N/a	—N/a	—N/a	—N/a	—N/a	97,348	23.25%	115,899	23.34%	140,428	24.04%
Dadu District	—N/a	—N/a	—N/a	—N/a	—N/a	—N/a	—N/a	—N/a	—N/a	—N/a	—N/a	—N/a	—N/a	—N/a	58,372	14.99%
Total Hindus	475,848	21.7%	544,848	21.43%	674,371	22.45%	787,683	23.1%	877,313	23.47%	876,629	25.24%	1,055,119	25.65%	1,279,530	26.43%
Total Population	2,192,415	100%	2,542,976	100%	3,003,711	100%	3,410,223	100%	3,737,223	100%	3,472,508	100%	4,114,253	100%	4,840,795	100%

Hindus (Note: Includes Castes (Hindu Jati), Scheduled Castes, Scheduled Castes and Scheduled Tribes/Tribals, Nanakpanthis, Prarthana Samaj, and Brahmoism.) in urban Sindh (1881–1941)
Urban area	1881		1891		1901		1911		1921		1931		1941	
Urban area	Pop.	%	Pop.	%	Pop.	%	Pop.	%	Pop.	%	Pop.	%	Pop.	%
Karachi	29,398	39.96%	44,651	42.44%	48,169	41.29%	66,253	43.62%	100,867	46.51%	120,730	45.81%	192,867	49.88%
Shikarpur	25,942	61.05%	25,852	61.55%	31,589	63.83%	35,171	65.2%	34,569	62.28%	39,605	63.36%	40,680	64.83%
Hyderabad	25,838	53.66%	33,559	57.81%	43,499	62.7%	49,732	65.48%	55,176	67.42%	70,404	69.23%	96,625	71.74%
Sukkur	12,838	46.87%	16,945	57.83%	19,313	61.67%	21,392	60.61%	25,368	59.33%	38,890	56.14%	46,467	69.91%
Larkana	5,779	43.82%	6,422	53.43%	8,314	57.17%	9,601	59.64%	10,727	60.53%	15,696	58.48%	19,949	71.03%
Jacobabad	4,744	41.79%	5,473	44.15%	4,762	44.15%	6,339	55.8%	5,244	49.55%	7,850	49.85%	11,561	53.55%
Rohri	5,272	51.56%	5,276	60.05%	5,971	62.61%	6,782	68.37%	6,314	55.49%	9,709	57.45%	10,460	71.05%
Thatta	4,348	49.24%	4,148	46.25%	5,598	51.92%	5,644	50.57%	3,980	46.99%	4,442	46.1%	4,055	49.08%
Garhi Yasin	3,147	56.79%	3,606	60.51%	4,068	62.07%	4,312	65.84%	3,826	60.02%	4,295	58.28%	5,426	64.62%
Kotri	2,685	30.09%	2,340	29.59%	2,279	29.92%	2,338	32.22%	2,635	28.9%	3,527	35.15%	4,538	45.48%
Qambar	1,858	30.3%	1,999	37.43%	1,525	31.72%	2,302	36.62%	2,475	32.51%	3,421	35.21%	5,361	45.9%
Matiari	809	16.01%	1,058	18.19%	1,403	21.23%	1,449	22.34%	1,117	24.08%	1,778	26.57%	1,575	26.65%
Tando Adam Khan	—N/a	—N/a	3,353	66.62%	6,187	71.41%	7,550	75.4%	9,315	71.84%	10,206	75.77%	14,049	81.52%
Khairpur	—N/a	—N/a	2,862	45.87%	5,138	36.66%	5,269	35.15%	5,046	32.06%	3,855	33.28%	7,786	44.47%
Umerkot	—N/a	—N/a	2,768	74.77%	3,884	78.88%	3,274	82.28%	3,140	74.78%	2,850	74.2%	3,218	75.27%
Mithi	—N/a	—N/a	2,660	88.93%	2,448	87.24%	—N/a	—N/a	—N/a	—N/a	—N/a	—N/a	—N/a	—N/a
Tando Allahyar	—N/a	—N/a	2,566	59.56%	2,843	65.75%	2,856	66.62%	3,664	61.32%	3,676	71.43%	6,622	78.78%
Sehwan	—N/a	—N/a	2,127	46%	2,477	47.23%	2,223	46.81%	1,928	43.59%	2,007	34.63%	2,145	49.15%
Tando Muhammad Khan	—N/a	—N/a	2,044	49.54%	2,462	53.12%	2,583	51.89%	2,795	53.51%	3,676	55.48%	5,748	65.93%
Ghotki	—N/a	—N/a	1,937	59.73%	2,349	61.48%	2,236	65.19%	2,176	61.54%	3,142	65.11%	3,701	70.68%
Hala	—N/a	—N/a	1,715	33.91%	1,596	32.02%	2,047	34.97%	2,137	37.12%	2,283	31.26%	2,597	32.61%
Ratodero	—N/a	—N/a	1,559	43.93%	2,105	49.17%	2,963	54.76%	3,303	59.35%	4,677	64.2%	7,515	75.72%
Naserpur	—N/a	—N/a	1,087	27.77%	1,374	30.46%	1,552	35.74%	1,541	37%	1,510	35.5%	1,279	35.43%
Manjhand	—N/a	—N/a	—N/a	—N/a	1,847	64.54%	1,817	64.02%	1,832	58.96%	1,492	54.33%	1,972	65.19%
Bubak	—N/a	—N/a	—N/a	—N/a	1,829	55.42%	1,777	55.07%	1,684	59.72%	1,697	56.53%	—N/a	—N/a
Mirpur Khas	—N/a	—N/a	—N/a	—N/a	1,783	63.98%	3,494	71.95%	4,155	71.77%	7,274	71.47%	13,947	71.19%
Keti Bandar	—N/a	—N/a	—N/a	—N/a	958	45.04%	753	43.43%	710	50.39%	822	49.67%	—N/a	—N/a
Shahdadpur	—N/a	—N/a	—N/a	—N/a	—N/a	—N/a	—N/a	—N/a	3,751	62.61%	5,881	66.47%	9,782	83.12%
Nawabshah	—N/a	—N/a	—N/a	—N/a	—N/a	—N/a	—N/a	—N/a	1,709	61.65%	4,237	60.33%	12,048	68.81%
Dadu	—N/a	—N/a	—N/a	—N/a	—N/a	—N/a	—N/a	—N/a	—N/a	—N/a	3,023	41.25%	5,601	51.4%
Gambat	—N/a	—N/a	—N/a	—N/a	—N/a	—N/a	—N/a	—N/a	—N/a	—N/a	2,317	36.86%	2,897	59.21%
Total Urban Hindus	122,658	47.02%	176,007	50.5%	215,770	52.45%	251,709	53.91%	301,184	53.56%	385,001	53.68%	540,471	59.13%
Total Urban Sindh Population	260,842	100%	348,535	100%	411,369	100%	466,895	100%	562,319	100%	717,175	100%	914,106	100%

=== Modern era ===
Hindu Population by district (2023)

In the 2023 census, Sindh's 4.9 million Hindus were 8.8 percent of the province's population; this included 1,325,559 (2.38 percent) scheduled-caste Hindus. However, the proportion of scheduled caste Hindus is actually higher as they categorize themselves as Hindus in the census rather than as Scheduled Caste Hindu. According to the Election Commission of Pakistan, voters who said that they were Hindu were 49 percent of the total in Umerkot and 46 percent in Tharparkar. According to voter estimates, Hindus have a population of 50,000 or more in 11 districts. All are in Sindh, except for Punjab's Rahim Yar Khan District.

Sindh also has Pakistan's highest percentage of Hindus overall, accounting for 8.8% of the population, roughly around 4.9 million people, and 13.3% of the province's rural population as per 2023 Pakistani census report. These numbers also include the scheduled caste population, which stands at 1.7% of the total in Sindh (or 3.1% in rural areas), and is believed to have been under-reported, with some community members instead counted under the main Hindu category. Although, Pakistan Hindu Council claimed that there are 6,842,526 Hindus living in Sindh Province covering around 14.29% of the region's population. A big part of the Hindu population in Sindh is landless bonded labour producing hugely profitable cash crops such as sugar cane. Hindu landless bonded labourers remain illiterate and suffer from abject poverty.

Umerkot District (54.66 percent), in Sindh, is Pakistan's only Hindu-majority district. The province's Tharparkar District has the highest district Hindu population. Four Sindh districts (Umerkot, Tharparkar, Mirpurkhas and Sanghar) account for more than half of the country's Hindu population.

Hindus in the administrative divisions in Sindh (1951–2023)
District	1951		2017		2023	
District	Pop.	%	Pop.	%	Pop.	%
Tharparkar District	277,626	38.02%	714,698	43.39%	811,507	45.64%
Hyderabad District	79,566	8.92%	180,926	8.22%	202,368	8.32%
Sukkur District	32,324	4.42%	52,902	3.55%	59,032	3.63%
Nawabshah District; Shaheed Benazirabad District (Note: 2008: District renamed from Nawabshah District to Shaheed Benazirabad District.)	30,066	4.38%	62,316	3.86%	82,817	4.49%
Karachi Federal Capital Territory	18,053	1.61%	—N/a	—N/a	—N/a	—N/a
Upper Sind Frontier District/ Jacobabad District (Note: 1952: District renamed from Upper Sind Frontier District to Jacobabad District.)	16,595	4.81%	21,712	2.16%	22,203	1.89%
Khairpur State/ Khairpur District	10,382	3.25%	66,489	2.76%	75,407	2.9%
Larkana District	8,375	1.67%	22,116	1.45%	25,794	1.45%
Dadu District	4,863	1.17%	8,984	0.58%	11,199	0.64%
Thatta District	4,710	1.56%	29,832	3.04%	31,649	2.92%
Mirpur Khas District	—N/a	—N/a	582,879	38.74%	697,318	41.48%
Umerkot District	—N/a	—N/a	559,824	52.15%	633,114	54.66%
Sanghar District	—N/a	—N/a	446,737	21.79%	564,648	24.47%
Badin District	—N/a	—N/a	426,142	23.61%	488,523	25.11%
Tando Allahyar District	—N/a	—N/a	286,537	34.17%	337,403	36.59%
Tando Muhammad Khan District	—N/a	—N/a	150,653	22.25%	174,105	23.98%
Matiari District	—N/a	—N/a	128,267	16.66%	153,170	18.03%
Ghotki District	—N/a	—N/a	101,974	6.19%	111,770	6.35%
Karachi South District	—N/a	—N/a	71,031	4.01%	98,772	4.24%
Karachi East District	—N/a	—N/a	39,590	1.38%	61,590	1.57%
Jamshoro District	—N/a	—N/a	38,510	3.87%	53,129	4.76%
Kashmore District	—N/a	—N/a	35,122	3.22%	39,667	3.21%
Malir District	—N/a	—N/a	34,125	1.77%	40,190	1.66%
Naushahro Feroze District	—N/a	—N/a	26,464	1.64%	28,978	1.63%
Sujawal District	—N/a	—N/a	22,720	2.92%	22,247	2.65%
Shikarpur District	—N/a	—N/a	17,246	1.4%	20,885	1.51%
Karachi West District	—N/a	—N/a	15,392	0.39%	7,849	0.29%
Korangi District	—N/a	—N/a	12,144	0.47%	13,896	0.44%
Karachi Central District	—N/a	—N/a	11,691	0.39%	12,184	0.32%
Qambar Shahdadkot District	—N/a	—N/a	9,963	0.74%	9,785	0.65%
Keamari District	—N/a	—N/a	—N/a	—N/a	10,208	0.49%
Total Hindus	482,560	7.98%	4,176,986	8.73%	4,901,407	8.81%
Total responses	6,047,748	99.89%	47,854,510	100%	55,638,409	99.9%
Total population	6,054,474	100%	47,854,510	100%	55,696,147	100%

== Traditions ==
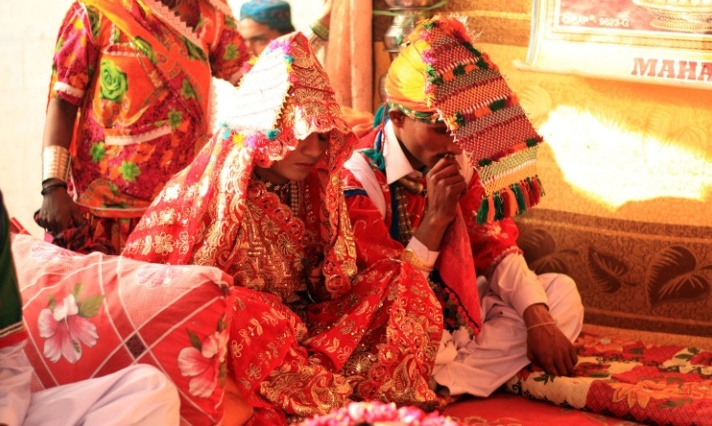
A Sindhi Hindu wedding

Many Hindus – especially in Sindh's rural areas – follow the teachings of 14th-century Ramdev Pir, whose main temple (Shri Ramdev Pir temple) is in Tando Allahyar. A growing number of urban Hindu youth in Pakistan associate themselves with ISKCON. ISKCON also holds Rathyatra every year in Karachi since 2015. Other communities worship mother goddesses, their clan (or family) patrons.

Many Hindus in Sindh revere Guru Nanak, the founder of Sikhism and Sikh gurus, along with the Hindu gods. A large percentage of Sindhi Hindus consider themselves Nanakpanthi. Sri Chand who is the eldest son of Guru Nanak and founder of Udasi sect is also revered whose main shrine Sri Chand Darbar is in Thatta city.

Hindus in Sindh also revere sufi saints like Shah Abdul Latif Bhitai, Lal Shahbaz Qalandar etc with high regards. Apart from these other lesser known sufi saints like Jam Lohar are also venerated. The Shah Abdul Latif Bhitai had visited the Hinglaj Mata temple and also mentioned about the shrine in Sur Ramkali. There is a legend that the Shah Abdul Latin Bhittai took on the arduous journey to visit the Hinglaj Mata Mandir to pay tribute to the Hinglaj Mata and offered milk to the Hinglaj Mata. It is also believed that after he offered the milk, the Hinglaj Mata appeared in front of him.

Sindhi Hindus who cannot afford travel to India to release their loved ones' remains into the Ganges go to Churrio Jabal Durga Mata Temple in Nagarparkar.

== Issues ==
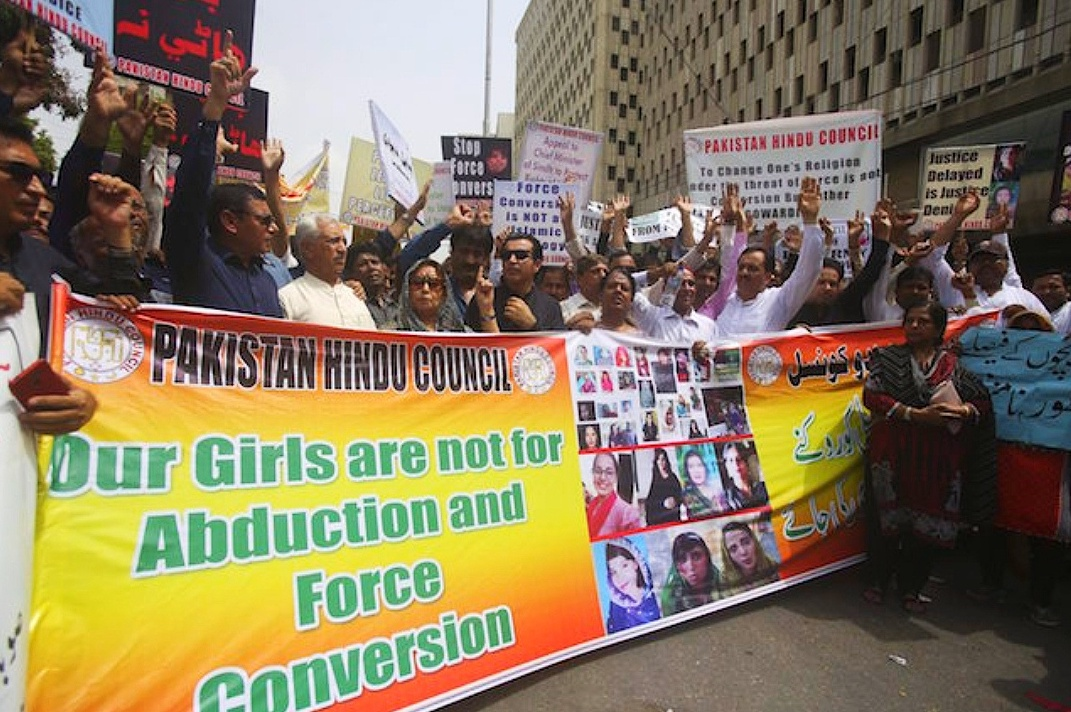
Protest against forced conversion of Hindu girls in Pakistan

According to a study, most scheduled-caste Hindus (91.5 percent) in the province's Tharparkar and Umerkot Districts faced discrimination and believed that its political parties are ignoring them. Forced conversion of Hindu girls is a major problem faced by Hindus in Sindh, with an increased number of cases in the southern districts of Tharparkar, Umerkot and Mirpur Khas. According to the 2026 UN analysis, about 80% of the forced conversion cases in Pakistan happened in the Sindh province. Sindh is Pakistan's only province with a separate law governing Hindu marriages.

== In Politics ==
Ten seats are reserved for minorities in the provincial assembly. In 2018, the Sindhi Krishna Kumari Kohli was the first Hindu to win a women's reserved seat in the Senate. In the 2018 general election, Mahesh Kumar Malani (representing Tharparkar-II) was the first Hindu candidate to win a general seat in the National Assembly of Pakistan. In the 2018 provincial assembly election, Hari Ram Kishori Lal and Giyan Chand Essrani were the first non-Muslims to win a general seat (non-reserved) in a provincial-assembly election.

=== Representation in Provisional Assembly ===
Hindu members of the Provincial Assembly of Sindh
Assembly	Total Hindu members	Hindu members by category
7th Provincial Assembly of Sindh (1985–1988)	5	Minority-reserved: Assar Das; Tikam; Ram Singh; Rattan Kumar; Mangha Ram
8th Provincial Assembly of Sindh (1988–1990)	5	Minority-reserved: Khatu Mal Jeewan; Jagdish Kumar Malani; Mehru Mal Jagwani; Hari Ram; Dewan Kumar
9th Provincial Assembly of Sindh (1990–1993)	5	Minority-reserved: Lachmandas Parwani; Hameer Singh; Mehro Mal Jagwani; Hari Ram; Mukhi Sarwanand
10th Provincial Assembly of Sindh (1993–1996)	5	Minority-reserved: Lachman Das Perwani; Humeer Singh; Mehroo Mal Jagwani; Hari Ram (son of Kishori Lal); Servanand
11th Provincial Assembly of Sindh (1997–1999)	5	Minority-reserved: Hameer Singh; Hari Ram; Mehru Mal Jagwani; Behru Lal; Giyanoo Mal
12th Provincial Assembly of Sindh (2002–2008)	9	Minority-reserved: Asardass Danoo Mal; Bhagoomal alias Bhagchand; Dayaram Essarani (Dayo); Ishwar Lal; Ishwardas; Mukesh Kumar; Poonjo Mal Bheel; Ramesh Kumar; Shankar Lal Talreja
13th Provincial Assembly of Sindh (2008–2013)	7	Minority-reserved: Hargun Das Ahuja (PPP); Lal Chand Ukrani (PPP); Mohan Mal (PPP); Mukesh Kumar Chawla (PPP); Pitanbar Sewani (PPP); Ram Singh Sodho (PML-F); Chettan Mal Arwani (PML-Q)
14th Provincial Assembly of Sindh (2013–2018)	9	Minority-reserved: Diwan Chand Chawla (PPP); Pesu Mal (PPP); Giyanoo Mal (PPP); Khatumal Jeewan (PPP); Lal Chand Ukrani (PPP); Mukesh Kumar Chawla (PPP); Nand Kumar (PPP); Poonjo Mal Bheel (PPP); Hargun Das Ahuja (PPP)
15th Provincial Assembly of Sindh (2018–2023)	11	Minority-reserved: Lal Chand Ukrani (PPP); Mukesh Kumar Chawla (PPP); Nand Kumar (PPP); Rana Hamir Singh (PPP); Dewan Sachanand (PPP); Surendar Valasai (PPP); Sanjay Gangwani (PPP); Sanjay Perwani (MQM-P); General: Hari Ram Kishori Lal (PPP); Giyan Chand Essrani (PPP); Women-reserved: Mangla Sharma (MQM-P)
16th Provincial Assembly of Sindh (2024–present)	9	Minority-reserved: Aneel Kumar (PPP); Giyanoo Mal (PPP); Khatumal Jeewan (PPP); Mahesh Kumar Hasija (PPP); Mukesh Kumar Chawla (PPP); Rana Hamir Singh (PPP); Surendar Valasai (PPP); Sham Sunder (PPP); General: Hari Ram Kishori Lal (PPP)

=== Pakistan Senate ===
Senate / period	Count	Hindu senators from Sindh
Senate established in 1973
March 2006 – March 2012	1	Ratna Bhagwandas Chawla (Women)
March 2009 – March 2015	1	Khatu Mal Jeewan (General)
Four non-Muslim-reserved seats added through amendment with Sindh getting one seat
March 2012 – March 2018	1	Hari Ram (Non-Muslim-reserved)
March 2015 – March 2021	1	Gian Chand (General)
March 2018 – March 2024	1	Krishna Kumari Kolhi (Women)
March 2024 – March 2030	1	Poonjo Bheel (Non-Muslim-reserved)

== Temples ==
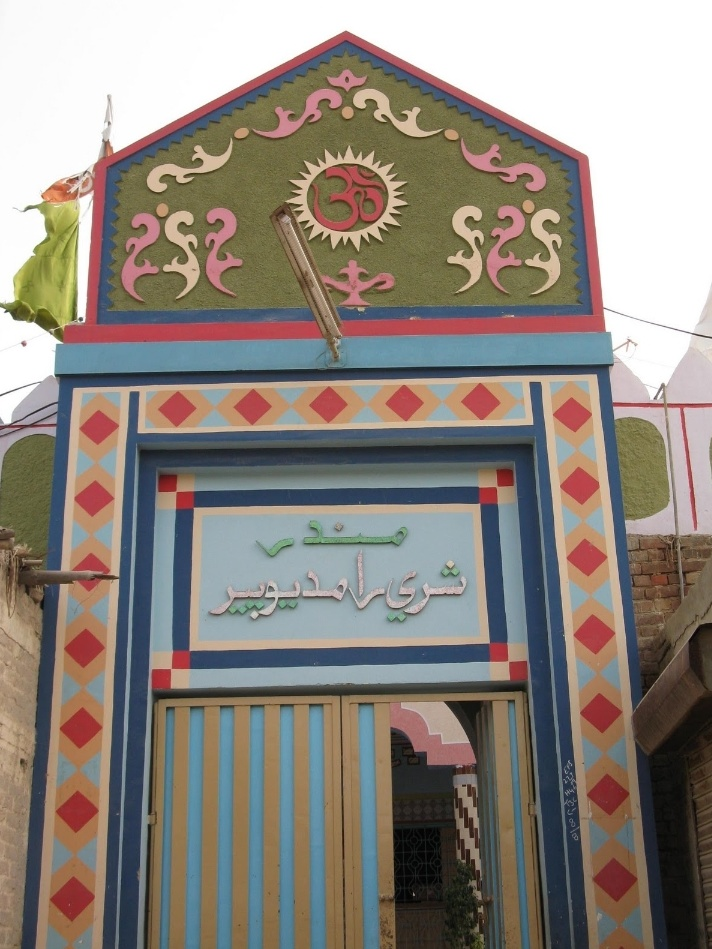
Ramapir Temple, Tando Allahyar, whose annual pilgrimage is Pakistan's second-largest Hindu pilgrimage

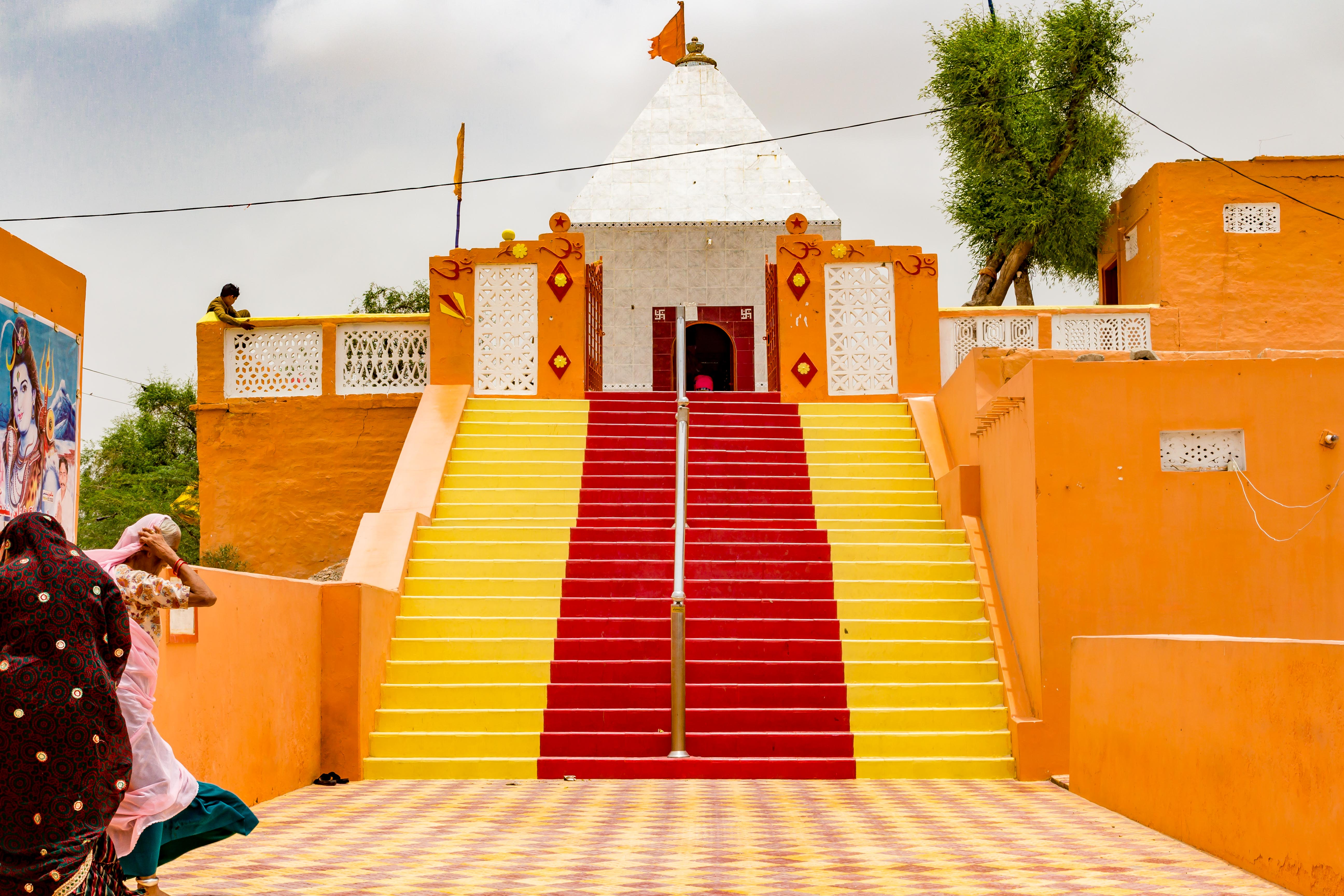
Umarkot Shiv Mandir, whose annual Shivrathri festival is one of the country's largest religious festivals

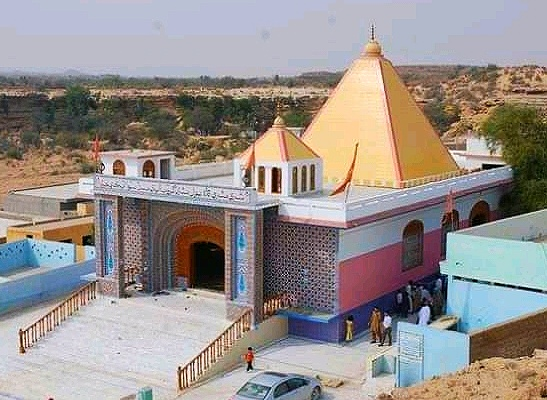
Guru Balpuri Ashram in Thana Bulla Khan

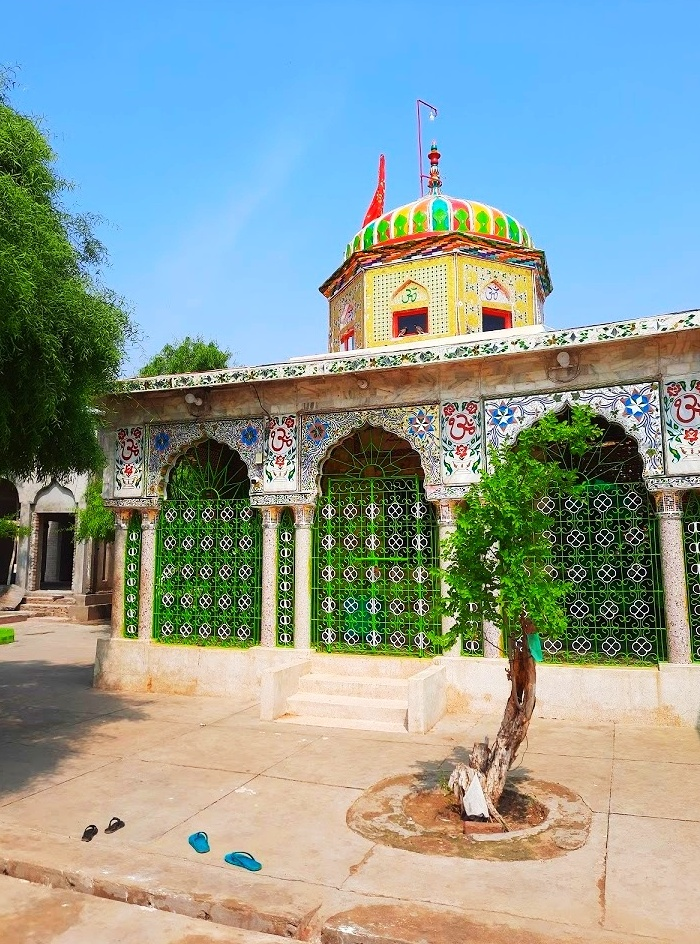
Sant Nenuram Ashram

== See also ==
- Hinduism in Balochistan
- Hinduism in Islamabad Capital Territory
- Hinduism in Khyber Pakhtunkhwa
- Hinduism in Punjab, Pakistan
