= Lal Chand =

Lal Chand may refer to:

- Lal Chand (athlete) (born 1928), Indian long-distance runner
- Lal Chand (businessman) (1960–2020), businessman and a former member of Pakistan's Sindh Assembly

== See also ==
- Lalchand, alternative form of the Indian male given name
- Lal Chand Kataruchakk (born 1970 or 1971), Indian politician
- Lal Chand Malhi (born 1973), Pakistani politician and member of National Assembly
- Lal Chand Mehra (1897–1980), Indian character actor
- Lal Chand Sohag (died 2025), Bangladeshi scrap dealer and murder victim
- Lal Chand Ukrani (born 1969), Pakistani politician
- Lal Chand Usta, designer of the Hawa Mahal (constructed 1799)
- Lal Chand Yamla Jatt (1914–1991), Indian folk singer
