= Mukesh Kumar =

Mukesh Kumar may refer to:

- Mukesh Kumar (cricketer) (born 1993), Indian cricketer
- Mukesh Kumar (field hockey) (born 1970), Indian field hockey player
- Mukesh Kumar (golfer) (born 1965), Indian golfer
- Mukesh Kumar Chawla (born 1974), Pakistani politician

== See also ==
- Mukesh (disambiguation)
