= Pakistanis in India =

Widely-defined demographic of Pakistanis within India

Total population
- 918,982 (2011 census)

Regions with significant populations
- Predominantly Northern India, Hyderabad and Chennai

Languages
- Sindhi, Punjabi, Hindustani, Brahui, others

Religion
- Predominantly: Hinduism and; Sikhism; Minority Islam

Related ethnic groups
- Pakistani diaspora

Pakistanis in India primarily consist of Pakistani Hindus and Sikhs who seek permanent settlement in the Republic of India via Indian citizenship. Others include Muslim Pakistani nationals who desire Indian citizenship or seek to work in the Indian Republic as expatriates. In December 2015, Anglo–Pakistani singer Adnan Sami became a naturalised Indian citizen after living in India on an extended visitor visa since 2001. The state of Maharashtra has witnessed a six-fold increase in applications for Indian citizenship from Pakistani nationals following the relaxation and simplification of immigration rules in December 2017. The primary purpose of these applications was a result of cross-border marriages, which have resulted in spouses waiting for citizenship for close to a decade.

Additionally, there are also an estimated 761 Pakistani nationals imprisoned within Indian jails, most of them serving their terms on charges of espionage and terror-related crimes.

There are an extensive number of Pakistanis illegally overstaying in India. In 2017, 250 illegal Pakistani immigrants were deported from India.

According to a report in the Pakistani newspaper Dawn, over 5,000 Pakistani Hindus migrate to India annually as refugees.

== Notable individuals ==
- Ram Singh Sodho, former member of the Provincial Assembly of Sindh
- Arjun Das Bugti, politician from Balochistan and former Deputy Speaker of the Provincial Assembly
- Adnan Sami, Pakistan-born musician

== See also ==
- India–Pakistan relations
- Baloch people in India
- Sindhis in India
- Indians in Pakistan
- Partition of India
