= Mukesh =

Mukesh is an epithet for the Hindu god Shiva, and literally means "conqueror of the Muka demon". It is commonly used as a male given name in India.

People with the name Mukesh include:

- Mukesh (singer) (1923–1976), Indian playback singer from 1940s-1970s Hindi cinema
- Mukesh (actor) (born 1956), Indian film actor and producer
- Mukesh Agnihotri (born 1962), Indian politician
- Mukesh Ambani (born 1957), chairman and managing director of Reliance Industries Limited
- Mukesh Batra (born 1951), homeopathy practitioner
- Mukesh Bhatt (born 1952), Indian film producer
- Mukesh Choudhary (born 1996), Indian cricketer
- Mukesh Choudhary (politician), Indian politician from Uttar Pradesh
- Mukesh Goud (born 1959), Indian politician belonging to the Indian National Congress
- Mukesh Haikerwal (born 1960), general practitioner and former federal president of the Australian Medical Association
- Mukesh Jagtiani (born 1952), Indian businessman, chairman of the Dubai-based Landmark International Group
- Mukesh Kapila (born 1955), British civil servant and United Nations official
- Mukesh Khanna (born 1958), Indian television and film actor
- Mukesh Kumar (disambiguation)
  - Mukesh Kumar (cricketer) (1993), Indian cricket player
  - Mukesh Kumar (field hockey) (born 1970), Indian field hockey player
  - Mukesh Kumar (golfer) (born 1965), Indian golfer
  - Mukesh Kumar Chawla (born 1974), Pakistani Politician
- Mukesh Mohamed (born 1980), playback singer, especially in Tamil cinema
- Mukesh Narula (born 1962), Indian cricket player and coach
- Mukesh Rishi (born 1956), Indian film actor
- Mukesh Tiwari (born 1969), Indian actor
