= Markazi Jamia Masjid, Rawalpindi =

Mosque in Rawalpindi, Punjab, Pakistan

Markazi Jamia Masjid
- مرکزی جامع مسجد
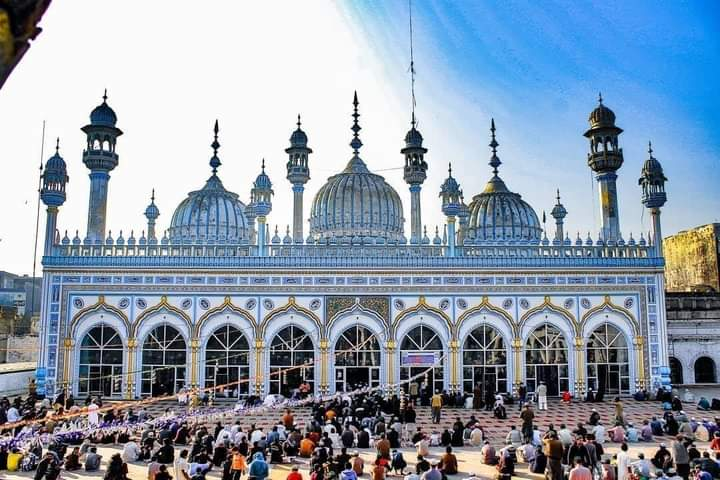

Religion
- Affiliation: Islam
- Status: Operational

Location
- Location: Rawalpindi District, Pakistan
- Country: Pakistan
- Interactive map of Markazi Jamia Masjid

Architecture
- Type: Mosque
- Style: Islamic architecture
- Established: 1896
- Completed: 1902

Markazi Jamia Masjid Rawalpindi (Urdu: مرکزی جامع مسجد) is a mosque located in Rawalpindi, Pakistan.

The mosque is one of the few antique mosques in the Potohar region. On the city's busiest roadway, the mosque is situated on the namesake Jama Masjid Road. The mosque, which is spread over 18 kanals, is an example of Islamic architecture. Three domes and dozen minarets make up the mosque. The Awqaf Department is in charge of running the mosque.

== History ==
The mosque was founded by Pir Mehr Ali Shah and Pir Mehra Sharif in 1896 and completed in 1902.

The foundation stone of the mosque was laid by Mohammad Ayub Khan (Afghanistan). The mosque incorporates several elements of Mughal architecture including three domes, minarets and tilework.

During the colonial period, Markazi Jamia Masjid became associated with major religious and communal developments in Rawalpindi during the 1920s. In June 1926, tensions arose during a Sikh religious procession. The procession passed near Jama Masjid Rawalpindi, where Muslim representatives requested that the accompanying music be stopped.

According to the proceedings of the British Parliament, the procession consisted of approximately 15,000 participants, and the disagreement contributed to rising tensions that later developed into communal violence in the city. Official reports presented before Parliament recorded 14 deaths and 46 injuries during the disturbances.

In the aftermath of these events, Rawalpindi continued to develop as an important centre for religious gatherings. Historical accounts of Eid Milad-un-Nabi celebrations in the Pothohar region identify 1927 as a significant year in the emergence of large public Rabi al-Awwal processions in Rawalpindi. Markazi Jamia Masjid and its surrounding area subsequently became closely associated with major Milad gatherings and religious processions in the city.
