= Kaloi Taluka =

ڪلوئي |
- Taluka
- Kaloi
- Country: Pakistan
- Province: Sindh
- District: Tharparkar

Population (2023)
  - Total: 129,677
- Time zone: UTC+5 (PST)

Kaloi (Sindhi: ڪلوئي) is a taluka of Tharparkar District in Sindh, Pakistan.

== History ==
The tehsil was announced by the Chief Minister Syed Qaim Ali Shah in 2016 and was notified on 13 June 2016.

== Demographics ==
=== Language ===
Almost all the people in Kaloi speak Sindhi (98.9%). The Dhatki language is spoken here.

=== Population growth ===
| Census | Population (Chachro Taluka) |
|---|---|
| 2017 | 117,609 |
| 2023 | 129,677 |

Kaloi is the most populated rural tehsil in Tharparkar District. 100% of the population lives in rural areas. The tehsil has a literacy rate of about 62.1%.

=== Religion ===
Religions in Kaloi (2023)
| Religion | Percent |
| Islam | 61.94% |
| Hinduism | 37.93% |
| Other or not stated | 0.13% |

Islam is followed by majority of the tehsil's population with significant Hindu population. The region is known for religious harmony and coexistence between Hindu and Muslim communities.

== See also ==
- Kaloi (tribe)
- Sant Nenuram Ashram
