= Bashir Masih =

Pakistani politician

Bashur Masih was a Christian politician from Balochistan, who served as the Deputy Speaker of the Provincial Assembly from 1993 to 1996 alongside Arjun Das Bugti.

== Political career ==
In 1972, Masih was elected to the National Assembly from NW-146. In 1985, 1988, and 1993, Masih was elected to the Provincial Assembly of Balochistan from the solitary seat reserved for Christians. In the 1990 elections, he sought election to the Provincial Assembly but was defeated by Johnson Ashraf. From 1993 till his death, he served as the Deputy Speaker of the Assembly.

== Death and legacy ==
On 8 April 1994, Masih died of a cardiac arrest. Bashirabad, a settlement for the local Christians, was constructed by him on the orders of Muhammad Zia-ul-Haq and carries his name.
