= Suman Pawan Bodani =

Pakistani Civil Judge

Suman Kumari
- سمن ڪماري
- Born: Qambar Shahdadkot District, Sindh, Pakistan
- Education: Shaheed Zulfikar Ali Bhutto Institute of Science and Technology
- Relatives: Dr Pawan Kumar Bodan (Father)
- Police career
- Rank: Civil Judge

Suman Pawan Bodani is a Pakistani judge. She and Diana Kumari are the first Hindu women to become judges in Pakistan. She is currently serving in her native district Qambar Shahdadkot.

== Career ==
Suman Kumari earned her master's degree in Law from the Shaheed Zulfikar Ali Bhutto Institute of Science and Technology University. She then worked for the law firm of advocate Rasheed A. Razvi. In 2019, she passed the examination for induction of judicial officers and was appointed as a civil judge.

== Personal life ==
Bodani lives in Qambar Shahdadkot District. Her father Dr. Pawan Kumar Bodani is an eye specialist. Her elder sister is a software engineer and another sister is a chartered accountant. Bodani is a fan of singers Lata Mangeshkar and Atif Aslam.

== See also ==
- Krishna Kohli
- Pushpa Kumari Kohli
- Veeru Kohli
- Mahesh Kumar Malani
- Rahul Dev
- Hinduism in Pakistan
