= PS-45 Mirpur Khas-I =

Constituency of the Provincial Assembly of Sindh, Pakistan

- Constituency for the Provincial Assembly of Sindh
- Region: Hussain Bux Mari Tehsil and Mirpur Khas Tehsil (partly) including Mirpur Khas city in Mirpur Khas District
- Electorate: 243,176

Current constituency
- Member: Vacant
- Created from: PS-64 Mirpurkhas-I (2002-2018); PS-47 Mirpur Khas-I (2018-2023)

PS-45 Mirpur Khas-I (پی ایس-45، مِيرپورخاص-1) is a constituency of the Provincial Assembly of Sindh.

== General elections 2024 ==
Provincial election 2024: PS-45 Mirpur Khas-I
| Party | Candidate | Votes | % | ±% |
|---|---|---|---|---|
| PPP | Hari Ram | 33,199 | 34.97 | |
| MQM-P | Zafar Ahmed Khan Kamali | 20,099 | 21.17 | |
| PTI | Aftab Hussain Qureshi (Note: Filed nomination papers as PTI candidate but ECP allowed him to run as an Independent) | 16,583 | 17.47 | |
| Independent | Salamat Ali Lakho | 7,654 | 8.06 | |
| Independent | Wazir Ali Mari | 3,172 | 3.34 | |
| JI | Noor Ilahi | 3,139 | 3.31 | |
| Independent | Mujeeb UI Haque | 2,387 | 2.51 | |
| TLP | Muhammad Javed | 2,040 | 2.15 | |
| Independent | Adnan Khan | 1,284 | 1.35 | |
| Independent | Shewa Ram | 972 | 1.02 | |
| Others | Others (twenty two candidates) | 4,411 | 4.65 | |
| Turnout | | 99,292 | 40.83 | |
| Total valid votes | | 94,940 | 95.62 | |
| Rejected ballots | | 4,352 | 4.38 | |
| Majority | | 13,100 | 13.80 | |
| Registered electors | | 243,176 | | |
| PPP hold | | | | |

== General elections 2018 ==
Provincial election 2018: PS-47 Mirpurkhas-I
| Party | Candidate | Votes | % | ±% |
|---|---|---|---|---|
| PPP | Hari Ram | 33,793 | 36.69 | |
| MQM-P | Mujeeb Ul Haque | 23,840 | 25.88 | |
| Independent | Syed Imtiaz Ali Shah | 12,312 | 13.37 | |
| Independent | Abdul Haque | 5,688 | 6.18 | |
| PTI | Aftab Hussain Qureshi | 2,975 | 3.23 | |
| MMA | Asim Shaikh | 2,397 | 2.60 | |
| TLP | Shakir Hussain | 2,054 | 2.23 | |
| PML(N) | Muhammad Asif Rajput | 1,962 | 2.13 | |
| PRHP | Samiullah | 1,739 | 1.89 | |
| Independent | Usman Mughal | 1,096 | 1.19 | |
| PSP | Shabbir Ahmed Qaim Khani | 789 | 0.86 | |
| Tabdeeli Pasand Party Pakistan | Zeeshan Ali | 614 | 0.67 | |
| AAT | Bashir Ahmed | 412 | 0.45 | |
| Independent | Saleem Khan | 326 | 0.35 | |
| Independent | Syed Ghulam Muhammad Shah | 303 | 0.33 | |
| PST | Mohammad Kashif | 292 | 0.32 | |
| SUP | Qaisar Khan Mari | 253 | 0.27 | |
| Independent | Muhammad Yaqoob | 210 | 0.23 | |
| GDA | Zeenat Talpur | 180 | 0.20 | |
| APML | Muhammad Jibran | 177 | 0.19 | |
| Independent | Muhammad Asim | 119 | 0.13 | |
| Independent | Karan Kumar | 114 | 0.12 | |
| MQM-H | Salman | 109 | 0.12 | |
| Independent | Abdul Sattar Ghori | 103 | 0.11 | |
| Independent | Mir Shehzad Ahmed Talpur | 101 | 0.11 | |
| Independent | Ghazanfar Ali Khan | 48 | 0.05 | |
| Independent | Sadoro | 43 | 0.05 | |
| Independent | Muhammad Saqib | 33 | 0.04 | |
| Independent | Ashfaque Ahmed Khan | 14 | 0.02 | |
| Independent | Javed Iqbal | 12 | 0.01 | |
| Majority | | 9,953 | 10.81 | |
| Valid ballots | | 92,108 | | |
| Rejected ballots | | 3,899 | | |
| Turnout | | 96,007 | | |
| Registered electors | | 198,868 | | |
| hold | | | | |

== General elections 2003 ==
| Contesting candidates | Party affiliation | Votes polled |
|---|---|---|
| Shabbir Qaimkhani | Muttahida Qaumi Movement | 20000 |

== General elections 2008 ==
| Contesting candidates | Party affiliation | Votes polled |
|---|---|---|
| Farhan Ahmed | Muttahida Qaumi Movement | 32700 |

== General elections 2013 ==
| Contesting candidates | Party affiliation | Votes polled |
|---|---|---|
| Zafar Khan Kamali | Muttahida Qaumi Movement | 30000 |

== See also ==
- PS-44 Sanghar-V
- PS-46 Mirpur Khas-II
