= Lalchand =

Lalchand Meghwal may refer to:

- Lalchand Fulamali, Indian politician
- Lalchand Hirachand, Indian industrialist
- Lalchand Kataria, Indian politician
- Lalchand Rajput, Indian cricketer

== See also ==
- Lal Chand (disambiguation)
