= Punjab Auqaf and Religious Affairs Department =

Government Department in Punjab, Pakistan

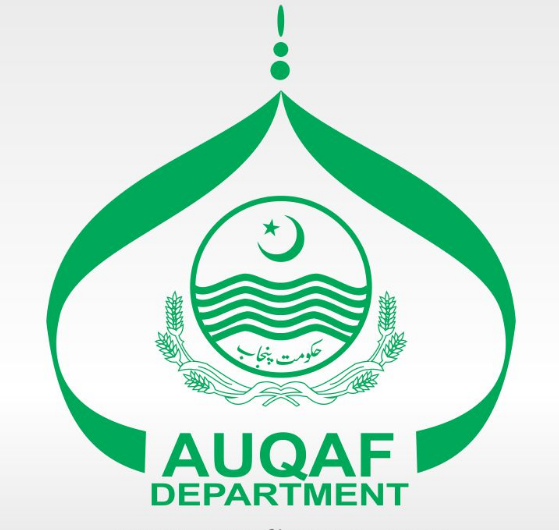

Agency overview
- Formed: 1 January 1960
- Jurisdiction: Government of Punjab, Pakistan
- Headquarters: Lahore Pakistan

Auqaf and Religious Affairs Department is a department of Government of Punjab, Pakistan. It handles the administration of 534 shrines, 534 masjids, 76,625 acres of land, 1,403 commercial/domestic properties, 2,789 employees, runs a 120-bed hospital at Data Darbar, 16 dispensaries in Punjab, organizes 11 zones, and acts as a liaison between the Auqaf Organisation and Punjab government. The Auqaf & Religious Department is headed by the Secretary Auqaf & Religious Affairs who is assisted by an Additional Secretary and Deputy Secretary.

The department is governed under the (i) Music in Muslim Shrines Act, 1942, (ii) Punjab Waqf Properties Ordinance, 1979., (iii) Punjab Pakistan Waqf Properties (Accounts) Rules, 1982, (iv) Punjab Waqf Properties (Administration) Rules, 2002 and (v) The Punjab Publication of Holy Quran (Elimination of Printing and Recording Errors) Act, 2010.

== History ==
Under the West Pakistan Waqf Properties Ordinance (1959) the Auqaf and Religious Affairs Department was established in 1960, in 1972 it became a provincial unit, then federalized in 1976, and then later returned to the provinces in 1979.

In 2020, the Auqaf and Religious Affairs Department banned the filming of movies and music videos in masjids and shrines after a controversy at Wazir Khan Masjid, Lahore where two music artists filmed a music video. An FIR was raised against the two artists alleging blasphemy and hurting public religious sentiments. In 2021, the Auqaf department lost the administration of Badshahi Masjid after then Prime Minister Imran Khan ordered the Punjab Government to take over its administration and said it should be granted to the Tourism department or Walled City of Lahore Authority (WCLA), stating the Auqaf department did not have the financial resources.

In November 2023, it was reported that the Auqaf department was collaborating with the Urban Unit Authority and the Punjab Information Technology Board (PITB) to digitize trust properties, commercial rent collection and the computerisation of commercial properties. In June 2024, the Punjab Auqaf department initiated a survey in 435 government masjids and 500 government shrines to determine the effect of khutbah "on worshippers and their families across the province," together with Lahore University of Management Sciences and Harvard University with district Khatibs supervising. Qari Abdul Rahim Abbasi of the Tahafuz Haqooq Ulema Council and Auqaf Dept Welfare Association said the survey would be conducted independently. Following the surveys completion, it would be upscaled and conducted in KPK, Balochistan, GB, Sindh and AJK. Express Tribune reported that following the survey "[n]ew public mosques will be built in the areas where there are no official mosques, while the scales of Imams and khatibs of the government mosques will be upgraded." And further claiming "the government mosques will be used to solve public problems and bring prosperity and development" after the survey.

In 2018, The Nation reported widespread corruption in the Auqaf department, Mian Ata Manika, who served as PMLN minister for Auqaf for three years, stated that there was "massive corruption" in the department and "I repeatedly tried to meet Shehbaz Sharif [the then Punjab chief minister], but he had no time for Auqaf." He further added that there was "powerful mafia" that occupied Auqaf land together with its officials. Writer Iftikhar Alam cited declining revenue collection, increasing expenditure and instances of malpractice, including almost 11,000 acres of illegally occupied land. Auqaf spokesman Asif Ejaz denied corruption and claimed committees to "raid cash boxes" and security cameras were installed. An inspection team of the Chief Minister of Sindh in 2023 similarly found corruption in the Sindh Auqaf Department in which Rs100 million was misappropriated from the maintenance of shrines. The caretaker Sindh government in November 2023 banned sub-leasing of Auqaf department proprieties to "curb" corruption.

The department has seen numerous reshuffles in bureaucratic officeholders; in January 2023, Syed Tahir Raza Bukhari was posted as Director General Religious Affairs Auqaf Punjab, while the previous DG Wahid Arjmand Zia was transferred to S&GAD. In March 2024, following the inauguration of the Maryam government in Punjab, major bureaucratic reshuffling occurred, as OSD Javed Akhtar Mahmood became Secretary of the Auqaf & Religious Affairs Department, while later in June 2024, Ahmad Afnan and Nabila Javed were reshuffled as Additional Secretary (Auqaf and Religious Affairs Department) together with other postings.

== Organization ==
The Department Organization comprises the following six Directorates:

- Directorate of Administration
- Directorate of Estate
- Directorate of Finance
- Directorate of Religious Affairs
- Directorate of Projects
- Directorate of Health Services

The department also includes the following bodies:

- Punjab Quran Board
- Muttehida Ulema Board
- Khatamun-Nabiyyeen University
- Lahore Ittehad Bain-ul-Muslimeen (IBM) Committee Punjab
- Punjab Auqaf Organization

== Functions ==
Functions of department include:

- Administration of the Punjab Waqf Properties
- Mosques, shrines and other religious institutions under the control of the Chief Administrator of Auqaf, Punjab, except Historical monuments
- Management of and repairs of Badshahi Mosque, Lahore
- Hajj Affairs coordination with the Federal Govt
- Administration of the following;
  - Muttahida Ulema Board
  - Punjab Quran Board
  - Punjab Auqaf Ulema Academy
  - Jamia Hajveria
  - Markaz Maaraf-e-Aulia
  - Aiwan-e- Sufia
  - Shrines, graveyards and other religious sites
  - Ittehad Bain-ul-Muslimeen Committee
- Madrassah education and Model Deeni Madaris
- Religious charities, endowments, education, printing of religious works/books
- Administration of Data Darbar Hospitals

== Welfare services ==
Auqaf Department maintains 1 hospital and 14 dispensaries in the Punjab.

The department also distributes the "Jahez Fund" handled by Zonal Administrators in Punjab and Langar at Data Darbar, Lahore.

== Revenue generation sources ==
=== Leased Waqf Land ===
Agriculture land (banjar) under the administrative control of the department is offered for lease per annum. The department also leases land for seven years under the Tube Well Scheme.

Total property leased by department:

- 74,964 acres (Notified Waqf Land)

Agricultural land leased:

- 29,907 acres (Cultivable)
- 45,057 acres (Uncultivable)

Commercial land leased:

- 149 kanal (Commercial Area)
- 6,179 acres (Shops)
- 1,426 acres (Houses)
- 3151 acres (Graveyard)
- 363 acres (Commercial Area Available for Auction)

=== Other sources ===
The department also derives revenues from;

- Cash boxes at shrines
- Rent from the Waqf properties under the department
- Shoe keeping, flower shops, toilets contracts auctioned every year
- Fees on the transfer of property on rental basis
- Sale of books on Islamic topics and Sufia (Note: The department officially claims these are on 'no profit, no loss basis,' generating a "nominal amount," as the book are for "preaching and information...")

== See also ==
- Ministry of Religious Affairs
- Minority Affairs Department, Sindh
- Islam in Pakistan
- Zakat Council
