= Constituency RSM-162 =

Reserved constituency of the Provincial Assembly of Sindh, Pakistan

RSM-162
- Provincial Reserved constituency for the Provincial Assembly of Sindh

Current constituency
- Member: Mukesh Kumar Chawla

RSM-162 is a reserved Constituency of the Provincial Assembly of Sindh.

== See also ==
- Sindh
