= Punjab Human Rights and Minorities Affairs Department =

The Human Rights and Minorities Affairs Department is a department of the Government of Punjab, Pakistan. The department is responsible for protection and safeguarding the fundamental human rights without any distinction of creed, race or religion. The department also refers and recommends investigations and inquiries in case of any violation of human rights.

Administration of minorities affairs is done under The Christian Marriage Act 1872 and The Hindu Gains of Learning Act 1930.

== See also ==
- Minorities in Pakistan
- Minority Affairs Department, Sindh
- Human rights in Pakistan
