= Pushpa Kumari Kohli =

Female Hindu police officer in Pakistan

- پشپا ڪماري ڪوهلي
- Born: 1990 (age 35–36); Mirpurkhas District, Sindh, Pakistan
- Education: Dow University of Health Sciences
- Relatives: Narain Das (Husband)
- Police career
- Country: Pakistan
- Department: Sindh Police
- Service years: 2019–present
- Rank: Assistant sub-inspector of police (ASI)

Pushpa Kumari Kohli is the first Hindu woman to become a police officer in Pakistan. She was posted as assistant sub-inspector of police (ASI) in Sindh province after she passed the provincial competitive examination through Sindh Public Service Commission.

== Early life ==
Pushpa Kumari Kohli was born in 1990 into a Kori Scheduled Caste Hindu family. She grew up in a middle-class family in the Samaro town in the Mirpurkhas District of Sindh. Her father runs a grocery store and her mother works as a family planning officer with the Population Welfare Department.

== Education ==
Pushpa Kumari graduated from Dow University of Health Sciences in critical care in 2014.

== Career ==
Pushpa worked in the NGO Marie Stopes Society in hometown Samaro. Later she joined the medical field. Till 2018, Pushpa Kumari worked as an intensive care unit (ICU) technologist at the Benazir Bhutto Accident and Emergency Trauma Centre. In 2018, she applied for the vacant Assistant sub-Inspector post in 2018 and wrote the competitive public service commission exam in January 2019, which age qualified and became Assistant sub-inspector of police (ASI).

== Personal life ==
Pushpa Kumari is married to Narain Das, who works as a supervisor for Bahria Town. They are currently living in Karachi. She believes that her example would inspire other girls and women to join daring career choices like police, army, air force or navy.

== See also ==
- Krishna Kohli
- Mangla Sharma
- Veeru Kohli
- Suman Kumari
