= Sham Sunder =

Member of the Provincial Assembly of Sindh (2024–2029)

- شام سُندر ایڈوانی

Member of the Provincial Assembly of Sindh
- Incumbent
- Assumed office 25 February 2024
- Constituency: Reserved seat for minorities

Personal details
- Party: PPP (2024-present)

Sham Sunder (Urdu: شام سُندر ایڈوانی) is a Pakistani politician who is member of the Provincial Assembly of Sindh.

== Political career ==
Sunder was allotted a reserved seat for minorities in the Provincial Assembly of Sindh after the 2024 Sindh provincial election as part of the reserved quota for Pakistan People’s Party Parliamentarians.
