= Mehrumal Jagwani =

Hindu politician

Mehrumal Jagwani (also Mehro Mal) was a Hindu politician from Sindh who served five consecutive terms in the provincial assembly from 1985 to 2002.

== Politics ==
Mal won five consecutive elections to the Provincial Assembly of Sindh in 1985, 1988, 1990, 1993, and 1997 as one of the five representatives from the Hindu community.
