= Hindu Singh Sodha =

Activist for Pakistani refugees in India

Hindu Singh Sodha (born 2 May 1956) is a well known activist for the cause of Pakistani refugees in India. He resides in Jodhpur, Rajasthan, but travels most of the time for meeting refugees. He is the founder of Pak Vishthapit Sangh (1999), Seemant Lok Sangathan (2005) and Universal Just Action Society – UJAS (2008).

== Family background ==
Hindu Singh's family belongs to Chachro in Tharparkar, within Sindh province of Pakistan. His father was a Pakistani, while his mother was an Indian from Rajasthan.

== Social and Political life ==
Working for Pakistani Refugees/Migrants:
