= Mahesh Kumar Hasija =

Member of the Provincial Assembly of Sindh (2024–2029)

- مہیش کُمار ہاسیجا

Member of the Provincial Assembly of Sindh
- Incumbent
- Assumed office 24 February 2024
- Constituency: Reserved seat for minorities

Personal details
- Born: Hyderabad, Sindh, Pakistan
- Party: MQM-P (2024-present)

Mahesh Kumar Hasija (Urdu: مہیش کُمار ہاسیجا) is a Pakistani politician who is member of the Provincial Assembly of Sindh.

== Political career ==
Hasija was allotted a reserved seat for minorities in Provincial Assembly of Sindh after the 2024 Sindh provincial election as part of the reserved quota for Muttahida Qaumi Movement – Pakistan.

In 2026, he told in the Sindh assembly that the Minority Affairs Department is corrupted. He argued to increase the salary of the low-grade employees to avoid corruption.
