= Ramesh Lal =

Pakistani politician

- رمیش لال

Member of the National Assembly of Pakistan
- Incumbent
- Assumed office 29 February 2024
- Constituency: Reserved seat for minorities
- In office 13 August 2018 – 10 August 2023
- Constituency: Reserved seat for minorities
- In office 1 June 2013 – 31 May 2018
- Constituency: Reserved seat for minorities
- In office 17 March 2008 – 16 March 2013
- Constituency: Reserved seat for minorities
- In office 16 November 2002 – 15 November 2007
- Constituency: Reserved seat for minorities

Personal details
- Born: 5 July 1968 (age 57)
- Party: PPP (2002-present)

Ramesh Lal (Urdu: رمیش لال; born 5 July 1968) is a Pakistani politician who is currently serving as a member of the National Assembly of Pakistan. Previously he was a member of the National Assembly from 2002 to August 2023. Lal is the only member of Parliament from minorities who has been elected for the fifth time consecutively.

== Early life ==
Lal was born on 5 July 1968.

== Political career ==
He was elected to the National Assembly of Pakistan as a candidate of Pakistan Peoples Party (PPP) on a seat reserved for minorities in the 2002 Pakistani general election.

He was re-elected to the National Assembly as a candidate of PPP on a seat reserved for minorities in the 2008 Pakistani general elections. From 2008 to 2013, he was the Parliamentary Secretary for Tourism, Minorities and Postal Services.

He was re-elected to the National Assembly as a candidate of PPP on a seat reserved for minorities in the 2013 Pakistani general election.

He was elected to the National Assembly as a candidate of PPP on a reserved seat for minorities in the 2018 Pakistani general election.

He has been re-elected to the National Assembly as a candidate of PPP on a reserved seat for minorities in the 2024 Pakistani general elections.
