= Ram Singh Sodho =

Pakistani Hindu politician (1945–2021)

Ram Singh Sodha

Provincial Assembly of Sindh

Personal details
- Born: 16 January 1945 (age 81) Arokhi, Diplo, Tharparkar District, British India
- Relations: Father- Ran Singh Sodho Grandfather- Samersingh Sodha

Ram Singh Sodha (Sindhi: رام سنگھ سوڍو) (16 January 1945 – 13 February 2021) was a former Pakistani Hindu politician. A member of the opposition Pakistan Muslim League (Q), he held a seat reserved for non-Muslims in the Provincial Assembly of Sindh, but in 2011 resigned and moved to India.

== Family and personal life ==
Sodho was born in Arokhi, Diplo, Tharparkar District, but later moved to Dileep Nagar, the district capital in Mithi. He is a lawyer by profession. He was born into an influential family in Sindh. His father, Ran Singh Sodha, was influential in his home community. Ransingh Sodha was the chairman of the union council Arokhi till up to death. Ransingh has no real sister; he was the only son of Samersingh Sodha. Samersingh Sodha was a member of the Tharparkar district council in Mirpurkhas.

Sodha's sons preceded him in moving to India. One son, Dileep Singh, moved there around 2001 but died in Bhuj during the 2001 Gujarat earthquake. His other son, Guman Singh Sodha, was an elected member of the Tharparkar district council and a construction contractor; in 2005, he was a member of the Pakistan Peoples Party. In 2007, Gumansingh moved to India as well, without formally resigning from the district council. The Hindustan Times reports that Sodho may also have other relatives in the Indian states of Gujarat and Rajasthan.

== Career ==
Sodho was first elected to the Provincial Assembly of Sindh in 1985. He also served as deputy mayor of Tharparkar District from 2001–2005. In 2008, when the PML gained a ninth seat in the Sindh Assembly, it was allocated to a non-Muslim, and, as such, to Sodho, who was at the top of the candidate priority list. He was a member of the Standing Committee on Public Health Engineering and the Standing Committee on Minority Affairs, and the chairman of the Standing Committee on Youth Affairs & Sports.

== Resignation ==
Conflicting reports surround Sodho's resignation; it may have been sparked by threats on his life or his ongoing health troubles. It was reported as early as November 2010 that both Arbab Ghulam Rahim and Sodho had not attended legislative sessions for a long time, and that their fellow PML-Q MPA said they were out of the country and had been granted leave by the assembly. Speaker Nisar Ahmed Khuhro was reported by Dawn to have received Sodho's handwritten resignation letter on 26 January, following a phone call the previous day. The Election Commission of Pakistan filled Sodho's seat with new appointee Chettan Mal Arwani, the next non-Muslim candidate on the PML-Q list. Sodho stated that he was stepping down for health reasons; colleague Abdul Razzaque Rahmo stated that spinal cord problems had left him with mobility issues. In contrast, Sodho's cousin Paret Lal stated that Sodho had received threats on his life, and Pitambar Sewani of the PPP claims that Sodho had been seeking political asylum in India for several years.

== See also ==
- Pakistanis in India
