= Hargun Das Ahuja =

Pakistani politician

Member of the Provincial Assembly of Sindh
- In office May 2016 – 28 May 2018
- Constituency: Reserved seat for minorities

Personal details
- Born: 1 March 1970 (age 56) Larkana, Sindh, Pakistan

Hargun Das Ahuja is a Pakistani politician who had been a Member of the Provincial Assembly of Sindh, from May 2016 to May 2018.

== Early life and education ==
He was born on 1 March 1970 in Larkana.

He has done Bachelor of Arts from Shah Abdul Latif University.

== Political career ==
He was elected to the Provincial Assembly of Sindh as a candidate of Muttahida Qaumi Movement on reserved seat for minorities in May 2016.
