= Aneel Kumar =

Member of the Provincial Assembly of Sindh (2024–2029)

- انیل کُمار

Member of the Provincial Assembly of Sindh
- Incumbent
- Assumed office 25 February 2024
- Constituency: Reserved seat for minorities

Personal details
- Born: Karachi, Sindh, Pakistan
- Party: MQM-P (2024-present)

Aneel Kumar (Urdu: انیل کُمار) is a Pakistani politician who is member of the Provincial Assembly of Sindh.

== Political career ==
Kumar was allotted a reserved seat for minorities in Provincial Assembly of Sindh after the 2024 Sindh provincial election as part of the reserved quota for Muttahida Qaumi Movement – Pakistan.
