= Bhawan Das =

Pakistani politician

- بھون داس

Member of the National Assembly of Pakistan
- In office 2008 – 31 May 2018
- Constituency: Reserved seat for minorities

Bhawan Das (Urdu: بھوان داس) is a Pakistani politician who had been a member of the National Assembly of Pakistan from 2008 to May 2018.

== Political career ==
He was elected to the National Assembly of Pakistan on a seat reserved for minorities as a candidate of Pakistan Muslim League (N) (PML-N) in the 2008 Pakistani general election.

He was re-elected to the National Assembly on a seat reserved for minorities as a candidate of PML-N in the 2013 Pakistani general election.

In April 2018, he quit PML-N and joined Pakistan Peoples Party.
