= Manwer Lal =

Pakistani politician

Member of the National Assembly of Pakistan
- In office 2008–2013

Personal details
- Born: Karachi, Sindh, Pakistan

Manwer Lal is a Pakistani politician who served as member of the National Assembly of Pakistan.

== Political career ==
He was elected to the National Assembly of Pakistan on a seat reserved for minorities as a candidate of Muttahida Qaumi Movement in the 2008 Pakistani general election.
