= Fakeero Solanki =

Fakeero Solanki, commonly known as Fakeero, is a Pakistani sculptor. He has made more than 352 sculptures of different personalities of the world.

He was born in Tando Allahyar to a Sindhi Hindu family of sculptors.

== Awards ==
In August 2020, he received the Tamgha-e-Imtiaz.
