= Minority Affairs Department, Sindh =

Government ministry in Pakistan

Agency overview
- Jurisdiction: Sindh, Pakistan
- Minister responsible: Giyanoo Mal, Proviniclal Minister for Minorities Affairs, Sindh
- Parent agency: Government of Sindh
- Website: minorityaffairs.sindh.gov.pk

The Minorities Affairs Department is a department of the Government of Sindh, Pakistan. It was established in 1995 with the Religious Affairs, Auqaf, Zakat and Ushr Departments, but became a separate department in 2010.

The department was created to safeguard the rights of minorities, facilitates legislation, implementing 5% minority quota in government jobs, maintenance of minority worship places etc. Minority students are given scholarship from the funds of the department. The department also provides facilities to the devotees going to the Hinglaj Mata temple including bus services, accommodation facilities etc.

== Controversies ==
In 2013, a case was filed in the Sindh High Court for alleged mismanagement of minority funds. During 2010-2011, the ministry was allocated Rs100 million. In addition to this, Rs 50 million was allocated for money distribution among Hindus during Diwali celebrations. Despite the then minority minister, Mohan Lal Kohistani announcing Rs 5,000 will be given to poor Hindus, the application forms for the financial assistance were not provided for them. The petitioner argued that only 2,500 application forms were distributed and it was mostly given to ministers and other leaders and not to the poor Hindus.

In 2015, the National Accountability Bureau arrested the former minority affairs secretary Badar Jamil Mandhro and former minority affairs director Khadim Hussain Channa for allegedly taking bribes for the appointment of 26 officers under the minority department.

In 2026, MPA Mahesh Kumar Hasija told in the Sindh assembly that the minority department is corrupted. He argued to increase the salary of the low-grade employees to avoid corruption.

== See also ==
- Minorities in Pakistan
- Punjab human rights and minorities affairs department
