= Manisha Ropeta =

Pakistani police officer

- Occupation: Police officer
- Known for: First Hindu woman DSP in Pakistan

Manisha Ropeta is a Pakistani police officer. In July 2022, she became the first Hindu woman in Pakistan, to become a Deputy Superintendent of Police (DSP).

== Early life ==
Ropeta belongs to a middle-class family from Jacobabad, Sindh Province. Her father, a trader, died when she was 13 years old. She has three sisters— all of whom are doctors, and one brother who is a medical student. She failed to clear her medical entrance examination by one mark.

Ropeta secured the 16th rank in the Sindh Public Services Commission examinations. After becoming successful in the entrance examination, she opted for a job in the police force.

== Career ==
Hinduism is a minority religion in Pakistan. In July 2022, Manisha Ropeta became the first Hindu woman in Pakistan, to become a Deputy Superintendent of Police. She said, "I want to lead a feminisation drive and encourage gender equality in the police force. I myself have always been very inspired and attracted to the police work". She is going to be posted in a crime-prone area of Lyari as a DSP. She is also one of the very few female police officers working in a senior role in the Sindh Police.
