= List of members of the 8th Provincial Assembly of Sindh =

Provincial elections were held in Sindh, Pakistan along with general elections, for National Assembly and all Provincial Assemblies, on 16 November.

== List of members of the 8th Provincial Assembly of Sindh ==
Tenure of the 8th Provincial assembly of Sindh was from 19 November 1988 till 6 May 1990.

Serial	Name	Constituency	District
1	Jam Mumtaz Hussain Dahar	PS-1	Sukkur
2	Ahmed Ali Khan Pitafi	PS-2	Sukkur
3	Jam Saifullah Dharejo	PS-3	Sukkur
4	Sardar Haji Khan Chachar	PS-4	Sukkur
5	Taj Muhammad Shaikh	PS-5	Sukkur
6	Syed Khursheed Ahmed Shah	PS-6	Sukkur
7	Agha Siraj Khan Durrani	PS-7	Shikarpur
8	Aftab Shahban Meerani	PS-8	Shikarpur
9	Ghous Bux Khan Mahar	PS-9	Shikarpur
10	Mir Shah Ali Khan Domki	PS-10	Jacobabad
11	Mir Hakim Ali Khan Sundrani	PS-11	Jacobabad
12	Mir Hassan Khan Khoso	PS-12	Jacobabad
13	Mir Ahmed Nawaz Khan Jakhrani	PS-13	Jacobabad
14	Ghulam Muhammad Shahliyani	PS-14	Jacobabad
15	Rahim Bux Jamali	PS-15	Nawab Shah
16	Jan Muhammad Brohi	PS-16	Nawab Shah
17	Syed Imdad Muhammad Shah	PS-17	Nawab Shah
18	Sardar Jam Tamachi	PS-18	Nawab Shah
19	Rais Mithai Khan Dahri	PS-19	Nawab Shah
20	Syed Murad Ali Shah	PS-20	Nawab Shah
21	Ghulam Murtaza Khan Jatoi	PS-21	Nawab Shah
22	Rais Raza Muhammad Dahri	PS-22	Nawab Shah
23	Syed Munawar Ali Shah	PS-23	Nawab Shah
24	Syed Qaim Ali Shah Jillani	PS-24	Khairpur
25	Syed Ali Taqi Shah	PS-25	Khairpur
26	Pir Syed Gul Shah	PS-26	Khairpur
27	Manzoor Hussain Wassan	PS-27	Khairpur
28	Fakir Imdad Ali Heesbani	PS-28	Khairpur
29	Mir Nadir Ali Khan Magsi	PS-29	Larkana
30	Syed Deedar Hussain Shah	PS-30	Larkana
31	Haji Munawar Ali Abbasi	PS-31	Larkana
32	Ghulam Mujtaba Khan Isran	PS-32	Larkana
33	Nisar Ahmed Khuhro	PS-33	Larkana
34	Haji Ghulam Hussain Unar	PS-34	Larkana
35	Makhdoom Abdul Hussain Alias Shafiq-Uz-Zaman (By Election)	PS-35	Hyderabad
36	Makhdoom Allah Bachayo Alias Rafiz-Uz-Zaman	PS-36	Hyderabad
37	Syed Naveed Qamar Shah	PS-37	Hyderabad
38	Muhammad Mubin	PS-38	Hyderabad
39	Muhammad Maqbool Ahmed	PS-39	Hyderabad
40	Ameenuddin	PS-40	Hyderabad
41	Shafique Ahmed Qureshi	PS-41	Hyderabad
42	Abdul Ghani Dars	PS-42	Hyderabad
43	Abdul Sattar Bachani	PS-43	Hyderabad
44	Syed Mohsin Shah	PS-44	Hyderabad
45	Syed Qabool Muhammad Shah	PS-45	Hyderabad
46	Haji Ghulam Hyder Nizamani (Late).	PS-46	Dadin
46.A	Haji Abdul Ghafoor Nizamani (By Election).	PS-46	Dadin
47	Mr. Bashir Hussain Leghari	PS-47	Dadin
48	Pir Ali Bahadur Shah	PS-48	Dadin
49	Muhammad Ismail Odhejo	PS-49	Dadin
50	Fakir Muhammad	PS-50	Tharparkat
51	Syed Ali Qutub Shah	PS-51	Tharparkat
52	Mir Munawar Ali Khan Talpur	PS-52	Tharparkat
53	Syed Ali Mardan Shah	PS-53	Tharparkat
54	Haji Muhammad Hayat Khan Talpur	PS-54	Tharparkat
55	Arbab Faiz Muhammad	PS-55	Tharparkat
56	Pir Noor Muhammad Shah	PS-56	Tharparkat
57	Haji Ghulam Muhammad Memon	PS-57	Tharparkat
58	Haji Muhammad Siddique Shoro	PS-58	Dadu
59	Syed Abdullah Shah (Speaker)	PS-59	Dadu
60	Pir Mazharul Haq	PS-60	Dadu
61	Sardar Nabi Bux Lund	PS-61	Dadu
62	Haji Amir Bux Junejo	PS-62	Dadu
63	Rafiq Ahmed Mahesar	PS-63	Dadu
64	Ghulam Hyder Wassan	PS-64	Sanghar
65	Khalifo Muhammad Aqil Hingoro	PS-65	Sanghar
66	Altaf Hussain Rind	PS-66	Sanghar
67	Jam Mashooq Ali Khan	PS-67	Sanghar
68	Abdul Salam Thaheem	PS-68	Sanghar
69	Syed Aijaz Ali Shah Sherazi	PS-69	Thatta
70	Sahab Dino Khan Gaho	PS-70	Thatta
71	Syed Shoukat Hussain Shah	PS-71	Thatta
72	Rasool Bux Malkani	PS-72	Thatta
73	Muhammad Bux Lashari	PS-73	Karachi
74	Syed Shahid Mian	PS-74	Karachi
75	Noor Muhammad	PS-75	Karachi
76	Abdul Razique Khan (Deputy Speaker)	PS-76	Karachi
77	Ashfaque	PS-77	Karachi
78	Izhar Hussain	PS-78	Karachi
79	Shamsul Arfeen	PS-79	Karachi
80	Ahmed Saleem Siddiqui	PS-80	Karachi
81	Muhammad Jawaid Akhtar.	PS-81	Karachi
82	Jaffar Ali	PS-82	Karachi
83	Syed Altaf Hussain Kazmi	PS-83	Karachi
84	Badar Iqbal	PS-84	Karachi
85	Nabeel Ahmed Gabol	PS-85	Karachi
86	Ali Muhammad Hingoro	PS-86	Karachi
87	Muhammad Irshad	PS-87	Karachi
88	Umar Yousaf Dada	PS-88	Karachi
89	Shaikh Ismail Azeem	PS-89	Karachi
90	Irfanullah Khan Marwat	PS-90	Karachi
91	Tariq Jawaid	PS-91	Karachi
92	Ghulam Murtaza Durrani	PS-92	Karachi
93	Abid Akhtar	PS-93	Karachi
94	Muhammad Naeem Akhtar	PS-94	Karachi
95	Muhammad Iqbal Qureshi	PS-95	Karachi
96	Muhammad Younus Khan	PS-96	Karachi
97	Khwaja Muhammad Awan	PS-97	Karachi
98	Abdul Hakeem Baloch	PS-98	Karachi
99	Syed Asif Hafeez	PS-99	Karachi
100	Muhammad Saleem	PS-100	Karachi
Reserved Seats for Minorities
Serial	Name	Constituency	Religion
101	Hoshang Homi Broacha	Reserved Seat for Minority	Others
102	Dr. Khatu Mal Alias Jeewan	Reserved Seat for Minority	Hindu
103	Jagdish Kumar Malani	Reserved Seat for Minority	Hindu
104	Mehru Mal Jagwani	Reserved Seat for Minority	Hindu
105	Hari Ram	Reserved Seat for Minority	Hindu
106	Dewan Kumar	Reserved Seat for Minority	Hindu
107	Michael Jawaid	Reserved Seat for Minority	Christian
108	Monica Kamran Dost	Reserved Seat for Minority	Christian
109	Shaikh Idrees Yahya	Reserved Seat for Minority	Christian
Reserved Seats for Women
110	Shagufta Jumani	Reserved Sear for Women	Hyderabad
111	Rashida Panhwar	Reserved Sear for Women	Dadu
112	Muneera Shakir	Reserved Sear for Women	Karachi
113	Shamshad Jokhio	Reserved Sear for Women	Shikarpur
114	Shamim Akhtar	Reserved Sear for Women	Hyderabad
