= Nand Kumar =

Politician in Pakistan

Nand Kumar Goklani

Member of the Provincial Assembly of Sindh
- In office June 2013 – 28 May 2018
- Constituency: Reserved seat for minorities

Personal details
- Born: 6 July 1967 (age 58) Sanghar
- Party: Pakistan Muslim League (F)

Nand Kumarl Goklani is a Pakistani politician who had been a Member of the Provincial Assembly of Sindh, from June 2013 to May 2018.

In 2018, he proposed amendment to the Sindh Hindu marriage act to add divorce and remarriage rights for Hindu couples which was passed.

== Early life and education ==
He was born on 6 July 1967 in Sanghar.

He has a degree of Bachelor of Arts which he received from G.D.P.S.S. College, Sanghar. He also has done Master of Arts in Economics and Bachelor of Laws, both from University of Sindh.

== Political career ==
He was elected to the Provincial Assembly of Sindh as a candidate of Pakistan Muslim League (F) on reserved seat for minorities in the 2013 Pakistani general election.
