= Surendar Valasai =

Journalist and Politician in Pakistan

Surendar Valasai (Sindhi: سريندر ولاسائي) (born 11 August 1968, near Kaloi, Tharparkar, Pakistan) is a Pakistani Meghwal Dalit journalist from the Tharparkar District. He was a member of Provincial assembly of Sindh on minority reserved seat from August 2018 to August 2023. He was elected as MPA again in 2024. Meghwar Community Leader

== Career ==
Valasai worked as a journalist for the English dailies The Muslim, Daily News, Sindh Express, Financial Post and The Balochistan Express, and as an editor for Sindh Tribune. As of 2013 Valasai became Media coordinator of Bilawal House, and on 8 November 2016 he was appointed as Incharge Media Cell Bilawal House. He was appointed as Advisor on Minority Affairs to Bilawal Bhutto Zardari, Chairman of Pakistan Peoples Party on 4 January 2014. Earlier, he was President of Sindh Peoples Students Federation SPSF Tehsil Diplo, Tharparker until 1990 after which he took up journalism. He was elected as Member of Provincial Assembly of Sindh on seat reserved for non-Muslims, and took his oath on 13 August 2018. He was appointed as Special Assistant to Chief Minister, Sindh for Human Rights on 5 August 2021 and continued to serve as a member of Sindh Cabinet till 11 August 2023.

=== Scheduled Castes Federation of Pakistan (SCFP) ===
Valasai formed the Scheduled Caste Federation of Pakistan (SCFP) to raise the issues of human inequality, untouchability and caste discrimination. Under the SCFP platform, he wrote petitions and letters to the President, Prime Minister and Chief Justice of Pakistan drawing their attention to the plight of Scheduled Castes tribes and particularly the Meghwal, Kolhi, Bheel, Bagdis, and Oads. His main emphasis was that since Pakistan did not subscribe to these social evils ideologically and spiritually, concrete steps were needed.

== Newspapers ==
- 1. The Muslim* Staff Reporter · May 1994 to Oct 1996
- 2. Daily News*
- 3. Sindh Express*
- 4. Financial Post* News Editor · Jan 1997 to Sep 2004
- 5. The Balochistan Times* News Editor · Mar 1993 to Feb 1994
- 6. Sindh Tribune*
