= Tara Chand (Pakistani politician) =

Pakistani politician

Provincial Minister of Balochistan
- In office February 22, 1997 – June 15, 1998
- Preceded by: Arjun Das Bugti

Personal details
- Born: Balochistan
- Party: Balochistan National Party
- Website: twitter.com/drtchand

Dr. Tara Chand is a former Provincial Minister of Balochistan.

== Political career ==
Affiliated to the Balochistan National Party, Chand won election to the Provincial Assembly of Balochistan in 1997 from the solitary seat reserved for Hindus. He defeated Arjun Das Bugti, who had won the seat in the last three elections. His brother Nanak Singh, a Sikh convert, had been a local politician too.

In July 2000, Chand fled Pakistan; he cited incessant harassment from local law enforcement after refusing to join the party floated by Pervez Musharraf.
