= Hari Ram =

Politician in Pakistan

- هري رام ڪشوري لال

Provincial Minister of Sindh for Minorities Affairs
- In office 19 August 2018 – 11 August 2023

Provincial Minister of Sindh for Social Welfare
- In office 19 August 2018 – 11 August 2023

Provincial Minister of Sindh for Prisons
- In office 19 August 2018 – 11 August 2023

Member of the Provincial Assembly of Sindh
- In office 13 August 2018 – 11 August 2023
- Constituency: PS-47 (Mirpur Khas-I)

Member of the Senate of Pakistan
- In office March 2012 – March 2018

Personal details
- Party: PPP (1988-present)

Hari Ram Kishori Lal (Sindhi: هري رام ڪشوري لال; Urdu: ہری رام کشوری لال) is a Pakistani Hindu politician from Sindh. A five-time legislator to the Provincial Assembly of Sindh, Ram was one of the first non-Muslims to win a non-reserved constituency in a Pakistani province in 2018 (alongside Giyanoo Mal, the first being Mahesh Kumar Malani in 2013). (Note: Before the promulgation of the 1973 constitution which reserved seats for minorities (non-Muslims were further barred from contesting elections on non-reserved seats in 1985 which was overturned in 2002), non-Muslims which had been elected include: Sindhi Hindus Aidansing Nagji Sodho, Dharamdas Motmal, Gulji Ratanji Menghwar, Lilji Akhji Sodho, Rup Chand Chelaram, Rup Chand Seoomal Luhano, Shambhoomal Hiranand Luhano, Sawaising Sonji Sodho, Teoomal Nathromal, Sirumal Kirpaldas as members of the 4th Provincial Assembly of Sindh after the 1953 Sindh provincial election (though it is unclear if these were reserved or non-reserved seats); and Buddhist Tridev Roy as a member of the 5th National Assembly of Pakistan after the 1970 Pakistani general election.)

He served in the Senate from 2012 to 2018.

== Early life ==
Ram was born on 29 May 1952 in Mirpurkhas. A landlord, he did not study beyond high school.

== Political career ==
Ram won four consecutive elections to the Provincial Assembly of Sindh in 1988, 1990, 1993, and 1997 as one of the five representatives of the local Hindu community; he did not have any political affiliation. In 2012, he was elected to the Senate of Pakistan from the Pakistan Peoples Party (PPP) on the sole seat reserved for minorities from Sindh. (Note: Ram secured 157 votes against a paltry 4, secured by Photo Mal alias Dileep of Pakistan Muslim League (Q).)

In 2018, he was elected to the Provincial Assembly from Mirpur Khas-I, becoming one of the first non-Muslims to win a non-reserved constituency in any provincial assembly of Pakistan. He was inducted into Chief Minister Syed Murad Ali Shah's cabinet, and made the Minister for Minorities Affairs with the additional portfolios of Social Welfare, and Prison.

== Personal life ==
Ram has a son. On 21 May 2021, he suffered a cardiac arrest while attending a ministerial meeting.
