= Constituency RSM-163 =

Reserved constituency of the Provincial Assembly of Sindh, Pakistan

RSM-163
- Provincial Reserved constituency for the Provincial Assembly of Sindh

Current constituency

RSM-163 is a reserved Constituency of the Provincial Assembly of Sindh.

== See also ==
- Sindh
