= Arjun Das Bugti =

Former Pakistani Politician

Arjun Das Bugti (ارجن داس بگٹی,अर्जुन दास बुगती) is a Hindu politician from Balochistan who served as the Deputy Speaker of the Provincial Assembly from 1993 to 1996 alongside Bashir Masih. He served for four consecutive terms in the Assembly before fleeing to India.

== Early life ==
Born Arjun Das, he was allowed to use the tribal surname of Bugti by Akbar Bugti, the head of the Bugti tribe, noted for his syncretic outlook and patronage of local Hindus.

== Political career ==
Bugti won four consecutive elections to the Provincial Assembly of Balochistan in 1985, 1988, 1990, and 1993 from the lone seat reserved for Hindus. From 1993 to 1996, he served as the Deputy Speaker of the Assembly, supported by the Jamhoori Wattan Party.

Bugti was defeated in the 1997 elections by Tara Chand and migrated to India a few years later; he is currently an Indian citizen. During Operation Jamhoor (2006) — which targeted Akbar Bugti and rendered thousands of local Hindus as refugees — Bugti had offered to arrange for the resettlement of Hindu casualties in India; most of the refugees declined.
