= Khatumal Jeewan =

Pakistani politician

Member of the National Assembly of Pakistan
- In office 2011–2013
- In office 1990–1999

Personal details
- Born: October 1, 1956 (age 69) Umerkot District, Sindh, Pakistan
- Party: PPP (1980-present)

Khatumal Jeewan is a Pakistani politician who served as member of the National Assembly of Pakistan and member of the Senate of Pakistan.

== Early life and education ==
He was born on 1 October 1956 in Umerkot, Sindh.

He is a doctor by profession and hold MBBS degree. He graduated from the Dow University of Health Sciences.

== Political career ==
He began his political career after joining the student wing of Pakistan Peoples Party (PPP) in the 1980s.

He was elected to the Provincial Assembly of Sindh in the 1988 Pakistani general election as a candidate of PPP on a minority seat.

He was elected to the National Assembly of Pakistan as a candidate of PPP for the first time in 1990 Pakistani general election. He disappeared during his tenure in 1991 and was forced to quit PPP.

He was elected to the National Assembly for the second time in the 1993 Pakistani general election and for the third time in the 1997 Pakistani general election. In 1998, he became federal Parliamentary Secretary for Population Welfare.

After PPP formed government following the 2008 election, he was made advisor to Chief Minister of Sindh for Mines and Minerals Development Department in 2008.

He was elected to the Senate of Pakistan in 2009 as a candidate of PPP where he continued until his resignation in 2011.

He was re-elected to the National Assembly of Pakistan on a seat reserved for minorities as a candidate of PPP in 2011.

He is the only Hindu Dalit politician in Pakistan who elected as a public representative for seven times.
