= Lal Chand Ukrani =

Pakistani politician

Dr. Lal Chand Ukrani

Member of the Provincial Assembly of Sindh
- In office June 2013 – 28 May 2018
- Constituency: Reserved seat for minorities
- In office August 2018 – August 2023

Personal details
- Born: 1 February 1969 (age 57) Jamshoro, Sindh, Pakistan
- Party: PPP (2013-present)

Dr. Lal Chand Ukrani is a Pakistani politician who had been a Member of the Provincial Assembly of Sindh, from June 2013 to May 2018. He has been elected again to the Provincial Assembly of Sindh as a candidate of Pakistan Peoples Party on reserved seat for minorities in 2018 Pakistani general election.

== Early life and education ==
Dr. Lal Chand Ukrani was born on 1 February 1969 in Jamshoro.

He has done Bachelor of Medicine and Bachelor of Surgery from Liaquat University of Medical Health Sciences, Jamshoro.

== Political career ==
Dr. Lal Chand Ukrani was elected to the Provincial Assembly of Sindh as a candidate of Pakistan Peoples Party on reserved seat for minorities in the 2013 Pakistani general election. He has been elected again to the Provincial Assembly of Sindh as a candidate of Pakistan Peoples Party on reserved seat for minorities in the 2018 Pakistani general election.
