= Giyanoo Mal =

Pakistani politician

Provincial Minister for Minority Affairs Sindh
- In office 13 August 2018 – 11 August 2023

Member of the Provincial Assembly of Sindh
- In office 13 August 2018 – 11 August 2023
- Constituency: PS-81 Jamshoro-II
- In office June 2013 – 28 May 2018
- Constituency: Reserved seat for minorities

Personal details
- Born: 1 January 1960 (age 66)
- Party: PPP (2013-present)

Giyanoo Mal also known as Giyanchand Essrani is a Pakistani politician who had been a Member of the Provincial Assembly of Sindh from August 2018 till August 2023.

== Early life ==
He was born on 1 January 1960.

== Political career ==
He was elected to the Provincial Assembly of Sindh as a candidate of Pakistan Peoples Party (PPP) on reserved seat for minorities in the 2013 Pakistani general election.

He was re-elected to Provincial Assembly of Sindh as a candidate of PPP from Constituency PS-81 (Jamshoro-II) in the 2018 Pakistani general election.

On 5 August 2021, he joined the cabinet of Government of Sindh as Provincial Minister for Minorities Affairs.
