= Lal Chand (businessman) =

Pakistani politician (1960–2020)

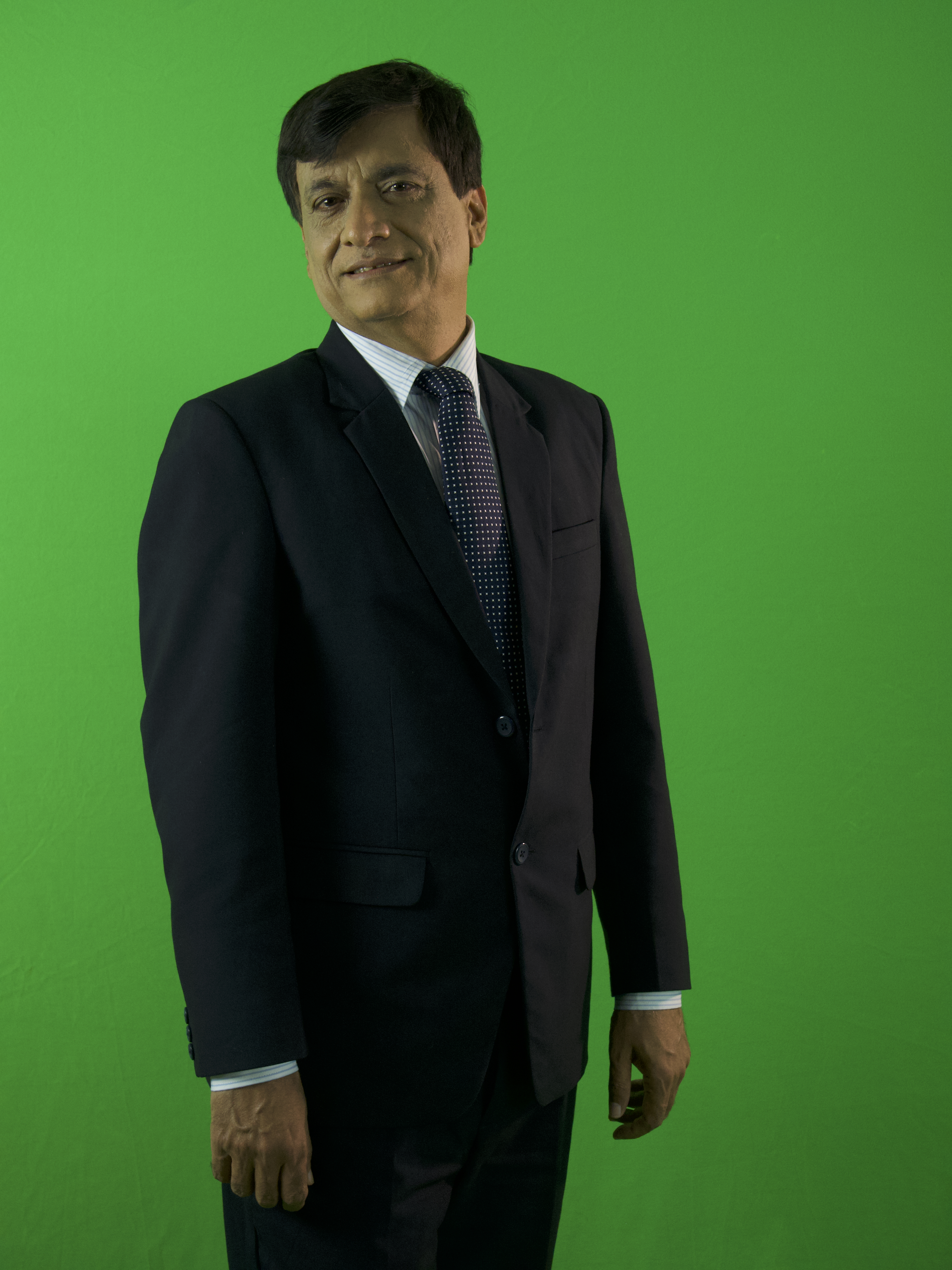
Mr. Lal Chand

Lal Chand (1 June 1960 – 31 July 2020) was a politician, businessman, wellness activist and a former Member of Pakistan's Provincial Sindh Assembly. He died of unknown causes at his home in Dubai on 31 July 2020.

== Early life ==
Chand was born on 1 June 1960, to a Hindu family in the outskirts of Taluka Bhatoro in Sindh. Pakistan. He got his early education from his native district Thatta. He Graduated in Civil Engineering from Mehran University of Engineering and Technology, Jamshoro. Lal Chand pursued his father’s business at the initial stage of his career. He ran Gangaram Kothi business of his father. After graduating in 1985, he was appointed as a sub engineer and then a lecturer in Mehran University.

== Real estate career ==
In 1989, Chand formally initiated the business of real estate with the name Lal Associate in Hyderabad, Pakistan. His then newly started business includes real estate, construction and property development. He uplifted his career while venturing into Pakistan stock exchange business back in 1990. In early 2000s, Lal Chand inaugurated a well-known real estate and property development firm.

== Political career ==
He served as a member in Pakistan's provincial assembly of Sindh from 2008-2013 during Pakistan People’s Party government . During his tenure Lal Chand worked as a member of standing committee on Minority Affairs as well as a member of standing committee on SGA & CD. Leaving his political career in Pakistan he moved to Cyprus and later founded LC Well (https://www.lcwell.org/), a non-profitable organization in Dubai and UK aimed towards promoting Wellness and wellbeing.

== Formation of LC well ==
After getting the Cyprus nationality in 2015, Lal Chand Founded LC Well in Dubai and UK a wellness initiative with free yoga and counselling sessions to help society. He initiated a wellness lounge in London with the name LC Well in 2018. The goal of LC Well organization reflects the Lal Chand’s views of helping others. The LC Well organization offers free yoga and meditation classes. Also, this wellness organization gives various counselling sessions and workshops related to stress management and a healthy lifestyle. Currently, more than 10,000 people are the members of Mr. Chand’s LC well organization.
