= Veeru Kohli =

Pakistani human rights activist

Veeru Kohli (Urdu: ویرو کوہلی ; 1964-2023) was a Pakistani bonded labor and human rights activist. She was known for starting to campaign against slavery after twenty years of living in bondage herself.

== Personal life ==
She was born to a poor Hindu Kori Scheduled Caste agricultural labourer's family in Allahdino Shah village in Jhuddo, Sindh province, and was married at the age of 16 into a family bonded to their landlord. She died a widow and left 11 children. Her name is sometimes written as Veero Kohli. She died on 31st Oct 2023

== Campaigning ==
In 2013, she ran as an independent candidate in the Hyderabad provincial elections.

She had previously been a slave in southern Pakistan but escaped her captors.

After being forced back into bondage and suffering beatings she stood up to the authorities and gained her freedom, with help from the Human Rights Commission of Pakistan in Hyderabad. Her experiences inspired her to campaign for freedom for others. This meant she, as a Saraiki speaker, had to learn Urdu to enable her to communicate with a wide range of people. Oxfam have helped her promote her ideas and develop her confidence.

In 2009 she was given the Frederick Douglass Freedom Award by the Free the Slaves organisation.

== Azad Nagar ==
Azad Nagar is the settlement that Veeru Kohli built with help from a local NGO Green Rural Development Organization (GRDO) and Action Aid in 2006. It was planned as a place where freed bonded labourers would live temporarily as they began their new lives. It has 310 families over 4.5 hectares of land. Most of the residents are Hindu.
