= Mukesh Kumar Chawla =

Pakistani politician

Mukesh Kumar Chawla Minister

Excise, Taxation and Narcotics
- In office 2013 – 28 May 2018

Excise, Taxation and Narcotics and Information Technology
- In office 2008–2013

Member of the Provincial Assembly of Sindh
- Incumbent
- Assumed office 31 May 2013
- Constituency: Constituency RSM-162
- In office 2008–2013
- In office 2002–2007
- Constituency: Constituency RSM-163

Personal details
- Born: 27 February 1974 (age 52) Jacobabad, Sindh, Pakistan
- Party: PPP (2002-present)
- Occupation: Politician

Mukesh Kumar Chawla (Urdu: مکيش کمار چاولہ; born 27 February 1974) is a Pakistani politician hailing from Jacobabad District presently from DHA, Karachi, Sindh, Pakistan and belonging to the Pakistan Peoples Party Parliamentarians. He was serving as Minister of Excise and Taxation and Member of the Provincial Assembly of Sindh. Chawla has served as the excise and taxation minister for around 9 years as of 2017.

== Education and political career ==
Mukesh Kumar Chawla achieved his MA (Political science) degree from University of Sindh, Jamshoro. He served as member of the Provincial Assembly of Sindh during the Twelfth Assembly from 2002 to 2007 and the Thirteenth Assembly from 2008 to 2013.
For the Sindh Assembly, Mr. Chawla has served as Excise and Taxation Minister and as Minister overseeing narcotics enforcement and information technology.
