= Chettan Mal Arwani =

Pakistani Hindu politician

Chetan Mal Arwani (Sindhi: چيتن مل ارواني; born 1 March 1967) is a Pakistani Hindu politician. A member of the Pakistan Muslim League (Q), he holds a seat reserved for non-Muslims in the Provincial Assembly of Sindh.
