= Peshawar =

Capital of Khyber Pakhtunkhwa, Pakistan

Peshawar: پشاور (Urdu); پېښور (Pashto); پشور (Hindko)
- Metropolis
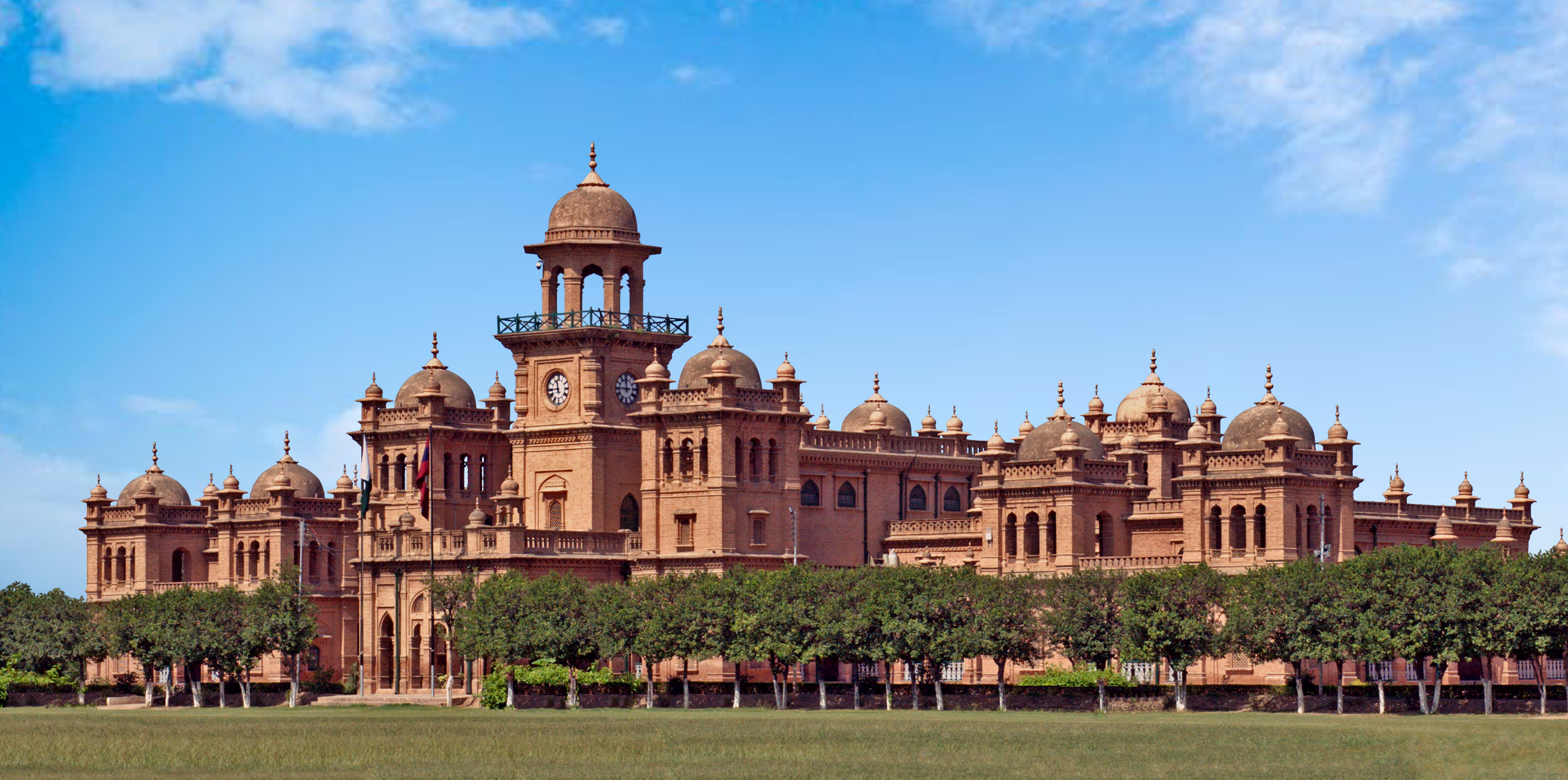
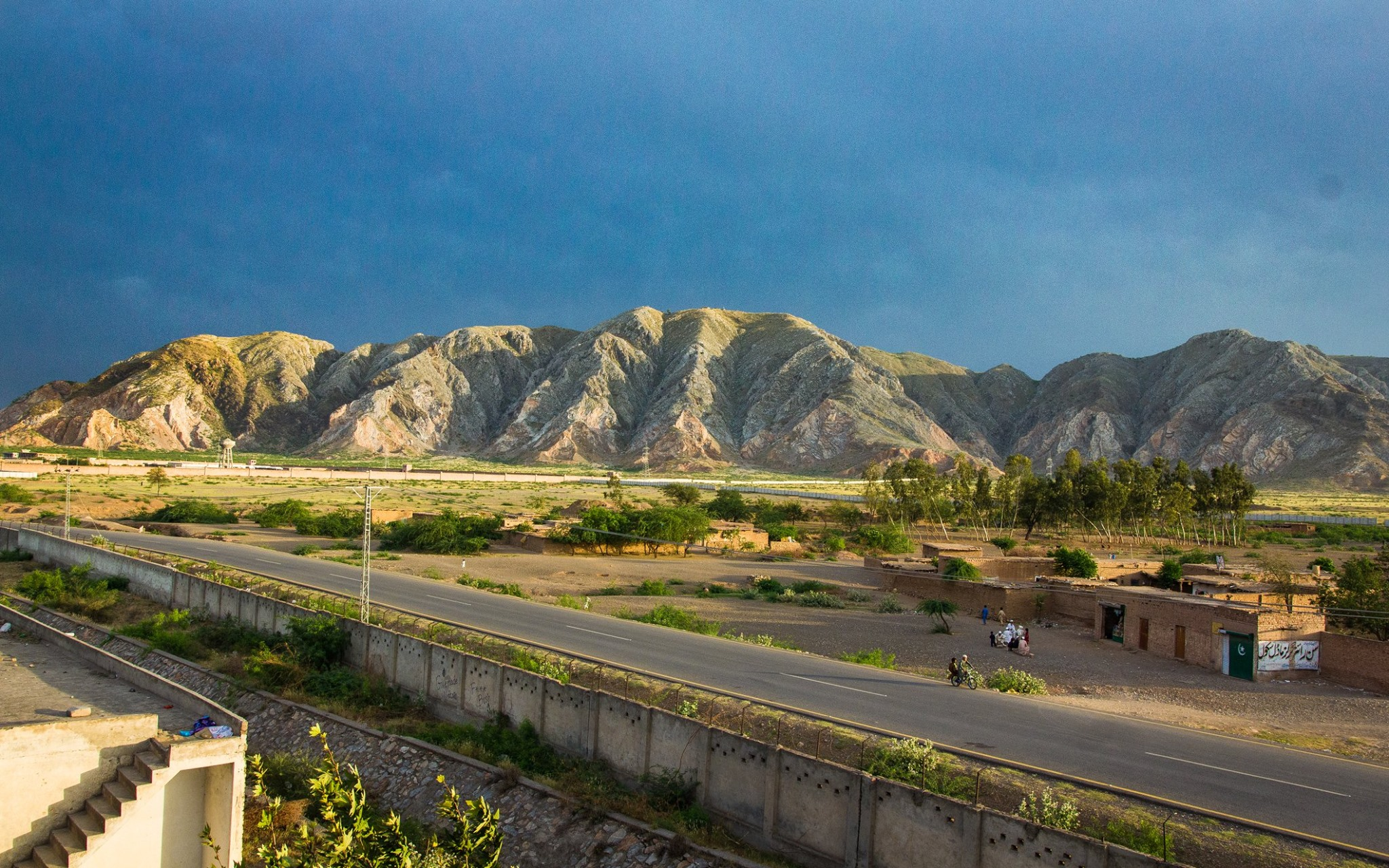
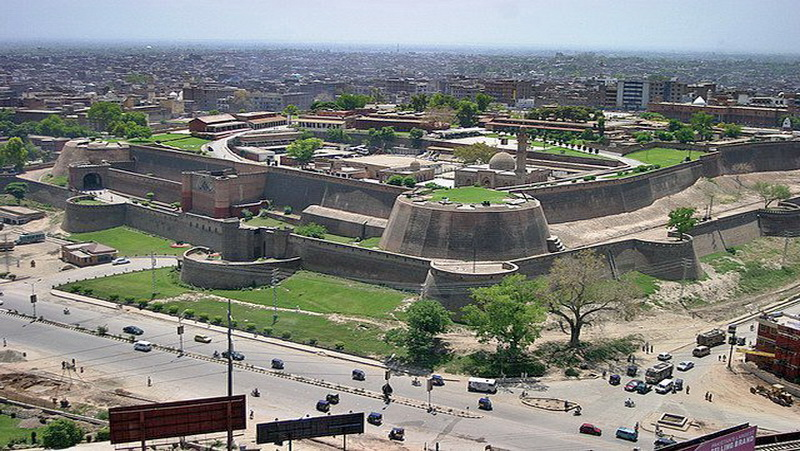
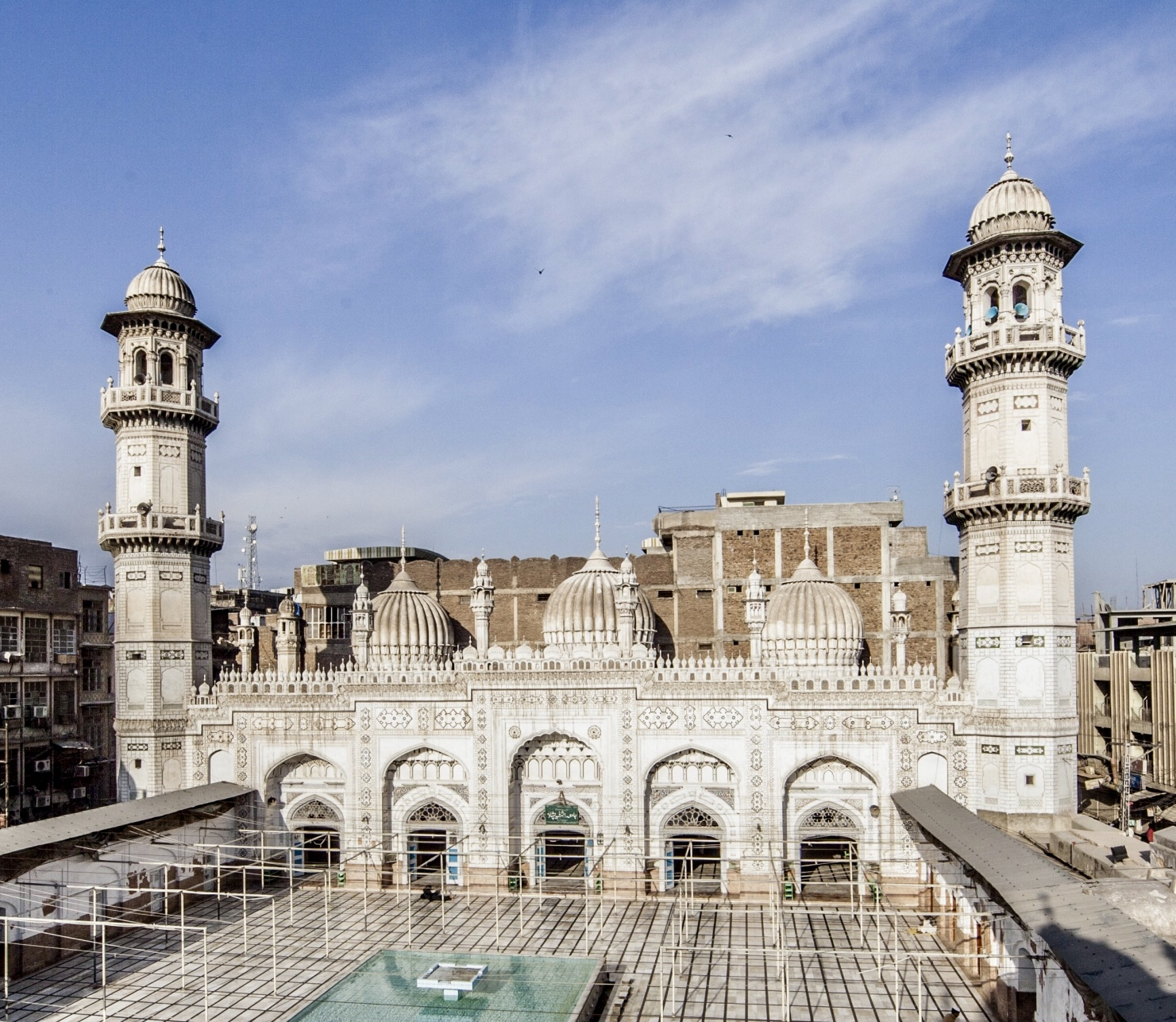
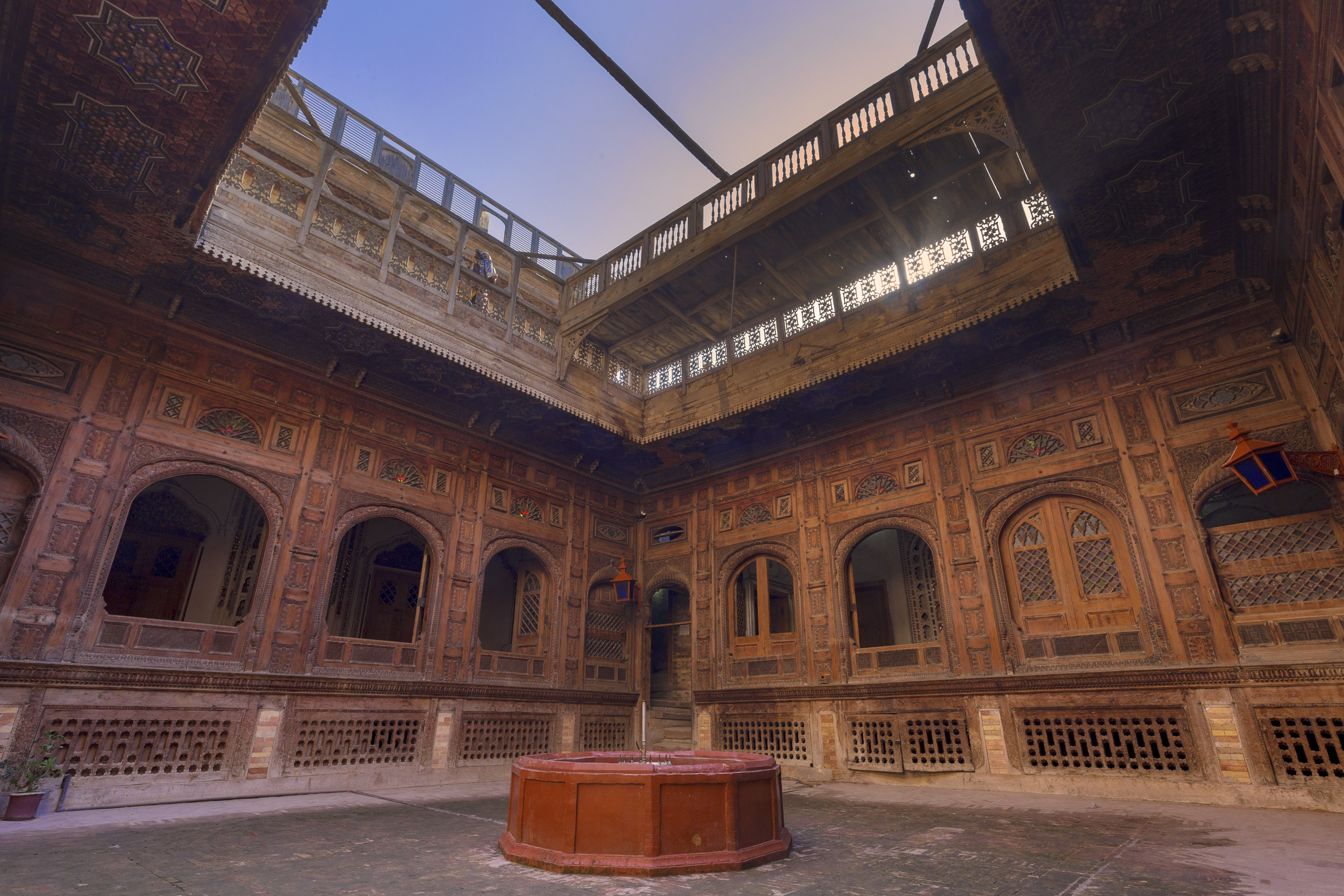
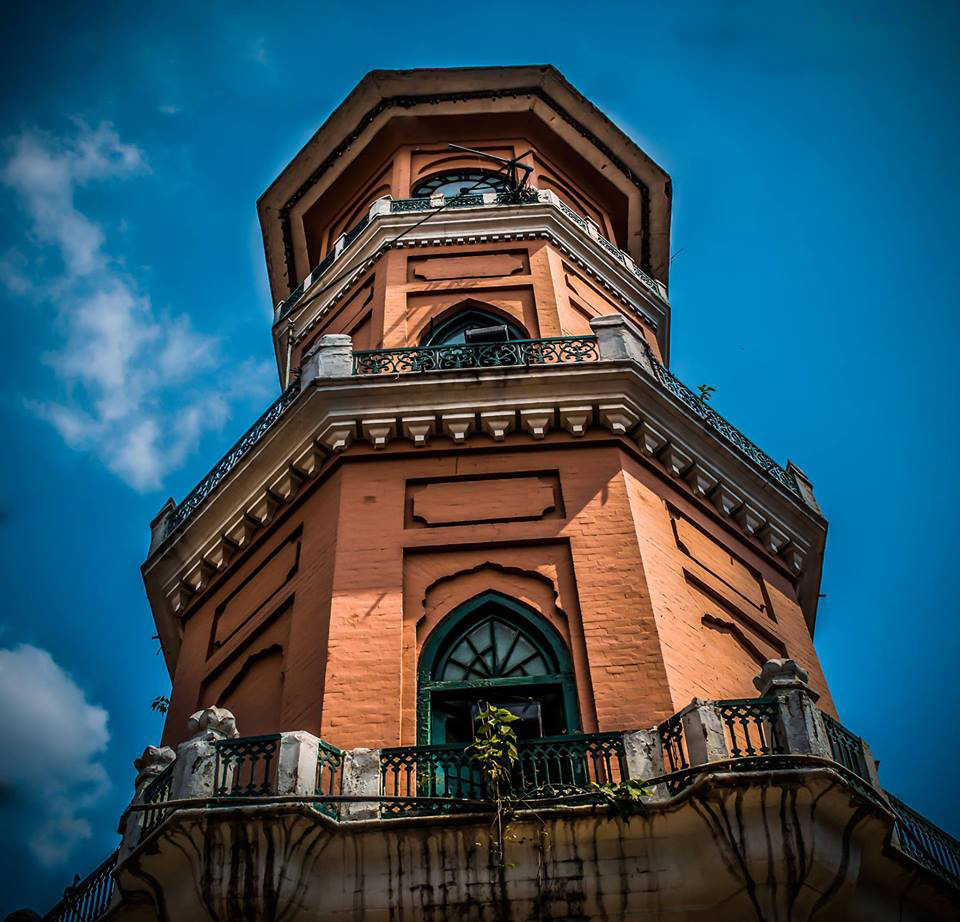
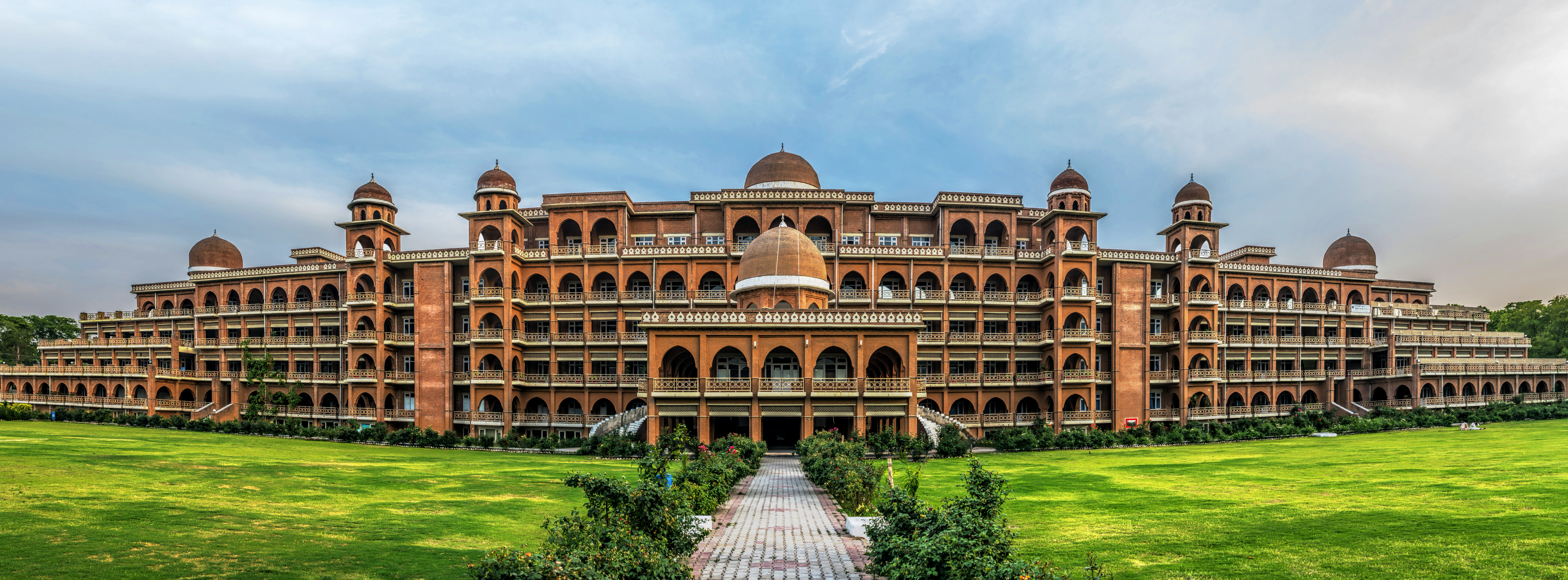
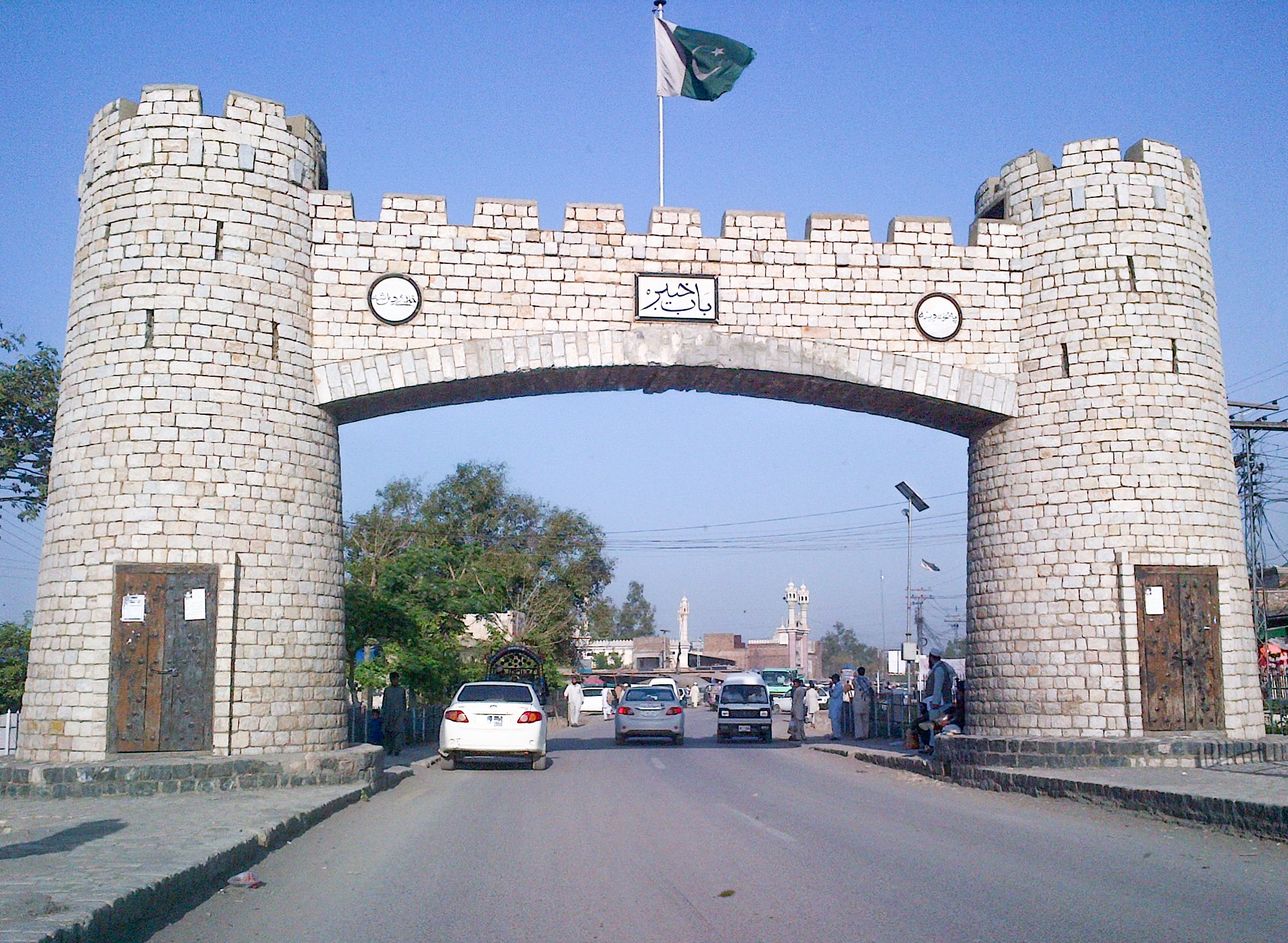
- Islamia College University City Exteriors Bala Hissar Mahabat Khan Mosque Sethi Mohallah Cunningham Clock Tower University of Peshawar Bab-e-Khyber

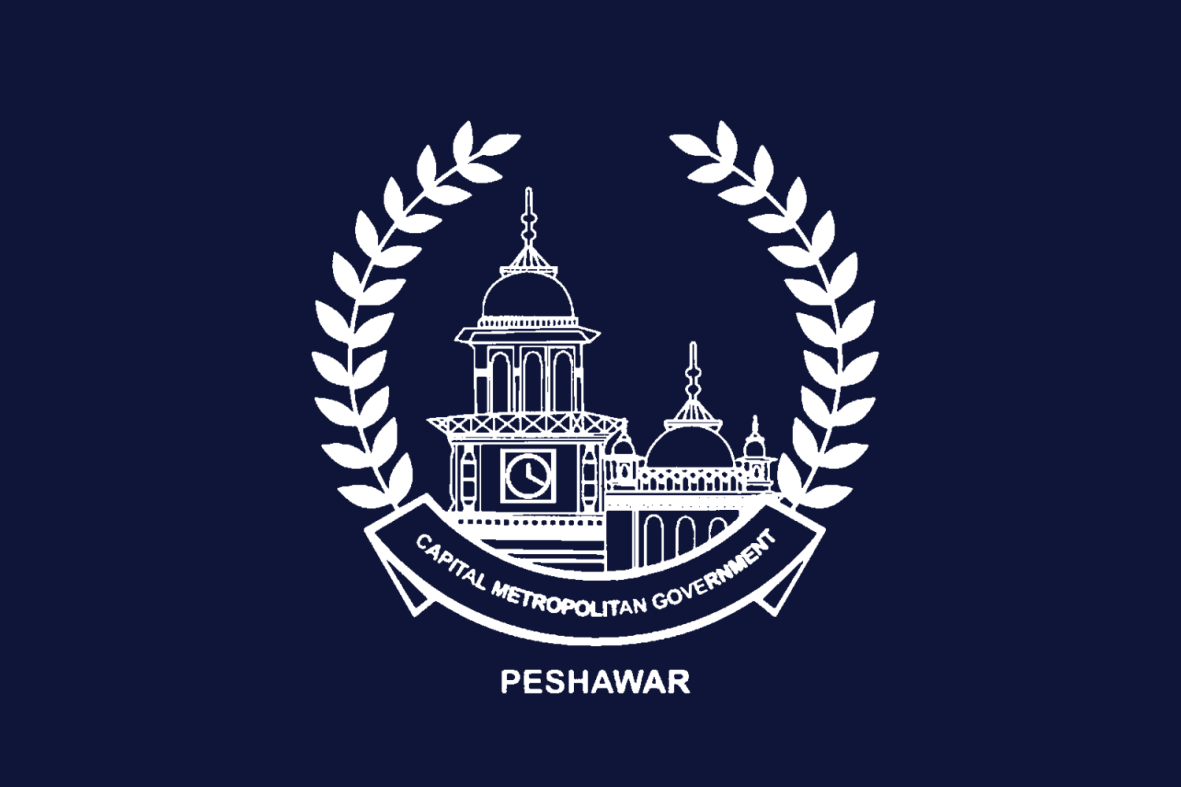
- Flag
- Nickname: City of Flowers
- Location within Khyber Pakhtunkhwa Location within Pakistan
- Coordinates: 34°00′52″N 71°34′03″E
- Country: Pakistan
- Province: Khyber Pakhtunkhwa
- District: Peshawar District
- Union councils: 92

Government
  - Type: Mayor–council
  - Body: District government
  - Mayor: Zubair Ali (JUI-F)
  - Commissioner: Riaz Khan Mehsud
  - Deputy Commissioner: Sanaullah Khan

Area
  - City: 215 km^{2} (83 sq mi)
  - Metro: 1,257 km^{2} (485 sq mi)
- Elevation: 331 m (1,086 ft)
- Highest elevation: 450 m (1,480 ft)

Population (2023)
  - City: 1,905,975
  - Rank: 8th, Pakistan
  - Density: 8,860/km^{2} (23,000/sq mi)
- Demonym: Peshawari
- Time zone: UTC+5:00 (PKT)
- Postal code: 25000
- Area code: 091 (+92)
- Languages: Pashto, Hindko
- Website: cmgp.gkp.pk

Peshawar (Note: English pronunciation: /pəˈʃɑːwər/; Urdu: پشاور [pɪˈʃaː.ʋər]; Pashto: پېښور [peˈʂə.wər, peˈʃə.wər, peˈçə.wər, peˈxə.wər]; Hindko: پشور [pɪˈʃɔːɾ]) is the capital and the largest city in the Pakistani province of Khyber Pakhtunkhwa. It is the eighth-most populous Pakistani city, with a population of over 1.9 million. It is located in the north-west of the country, lying in the Peshawar Valley, a broad area situated east of the Khyber Pass.

Peshawar's recorded history dates back to at least the sixth century BC, making it one of the oldest continuously inhabited cities in South Asia. One of the principal cities of the ancient Gandhara, Peshawar (then known as Puruṣapura) served as the capital of the Kushan Empire during the rule of Kanishka the Great in the second century CE. A variety of Muslim empires ruled the city following the conquest of Peshawar by the Ghaznavids from the Hindu Shahis in 1001 CE. It was an important trading centre of the Mughal Empire, later serving as the winter capital of the Durrani Empire from 1776 until its capture by the Sikh Empire in 1823. In 1849, the city was annexed by the East India Company along with rest of Punjab and subsequently became part of the British Raj. In 1901, Peshawar was made capital of the North-West Frontier Province after it was created by bifurcating the northwestern districts of Punjab Province. Following the Partition of British India in 1947, it became part of Pakistan.

Peshawar is a major cultural, political and economic centre of the region. During the colonial period and well into the early years after independence, the lingua franca of Peshawar was Hindko; in the succeeding decades, the rapid urbanization and the high rate of migration from the rural and the former tribal areas of the province, as well as the influx of Afghan refugees following the Soviet–Afghan War, transformed Peshawar from a Hindko to a Pashto-speaking city. Today Peshawar is largely populated by Pashtuns, although the original urban population, known as Peshoris, still have a significant presence in the central areas of the old Walled City.

== Etymology ==
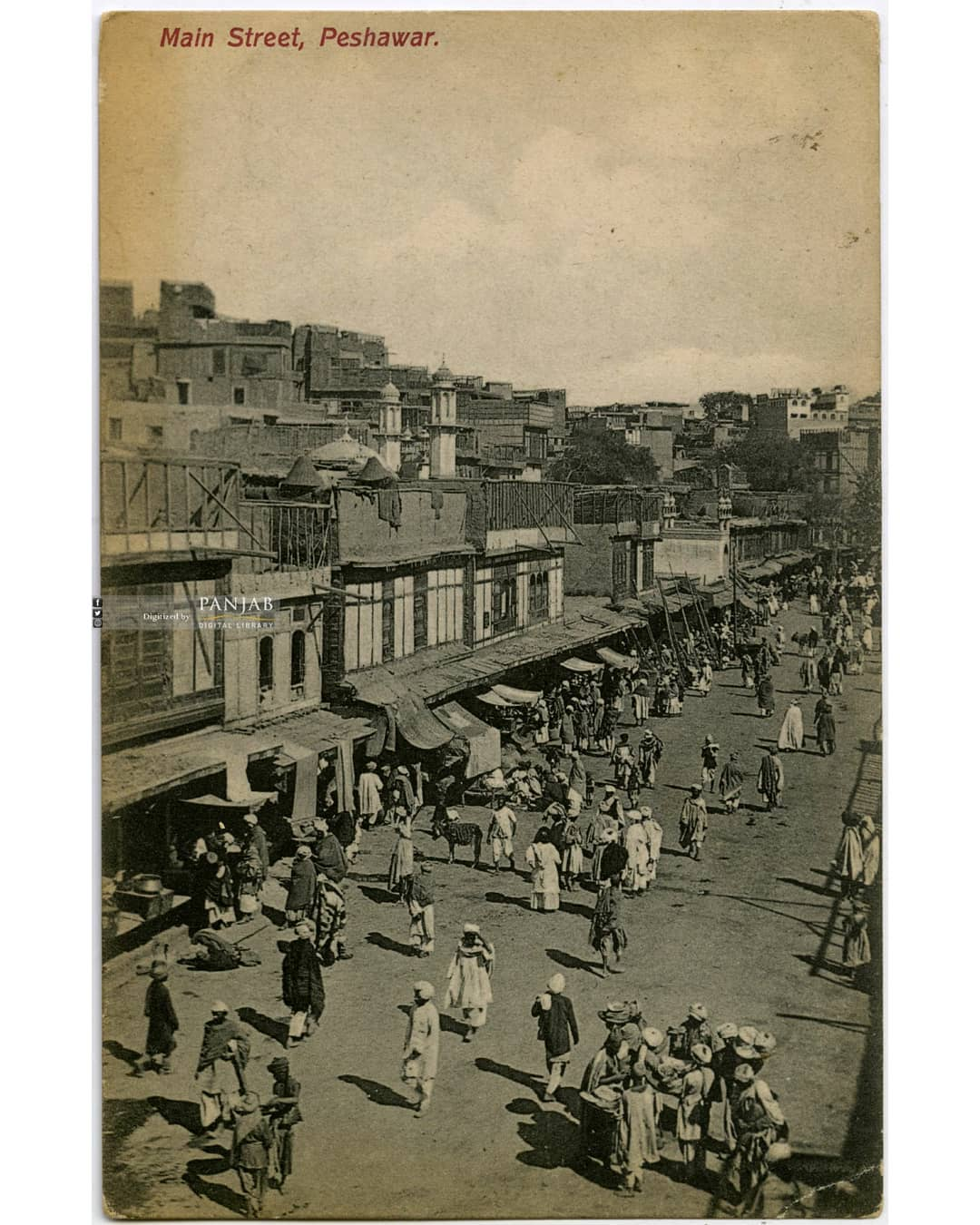
A vintage photo postcard of the main street, Peshawar. Digitized by Panjab Digital Library.

The modern name of the city 'Peshawar' is derived from reconstructed Sanskrit: Puruṣapura, lit. 'City of Men''. Chinese Buddhist monk Xuanzang's 7th-century account of a city in Gandhāra called the city Po-la-sha-pu-lo (Chinese: 布路沙布邏, bùlùshābùló), and an earlier 5th-century account by Faxian records the city's name as Fou-lou-sha (Chinese: 弗樓沙, fùlóushā), the Chinese equivalent of Puruṣapura. Sanskrit and Gandhari, written in the Kharoṣṭhī script, were the literary languages employed by the Buddhist kingdoms which ruled over the area during its earliest recorded period.

The city's name may have been instead derived from the Sanskrit name Poshapura, 'City of Flowers', a name found in an ancient Kharoṣṭhī inscription that may refer to Peshawar. An ancient inscription from the Shapur era identifies a city in the Gandhāra Valley by the name pskbvr, which may be a reference to Peshawar. The Arab historian and geographer al-Masudi noted that by the mid-tenth century, the city was known as Parashāwar. The name was noted as Purshawar and Purushavar by al-Biruni.

The city began to be known as Peshāwar by the era of Mughal emperor Akbar. It was named so by from its old name Parashawar, the meaning of which Akbar did not understand. Akbar's bibliographer, Abu'l-Fazl, lists the city's name as both Parashāwar, transcribed in Persian as پَرَشَاوَر, and Peshāwar (پشاور).

The current name is said by some to have been based upon the Persian word for "frontier town" or, more literally, "forward city", though transcription errors and linguistic shifts may account for the city's new name. One theory suggests that the city's name is derived from the Persian words Pesh Awardan, literally "place of first arrival" or "frontier city", as Peshawar was the first city in the Indian subcontinent after crossing the Khyber Pass.

== History ==
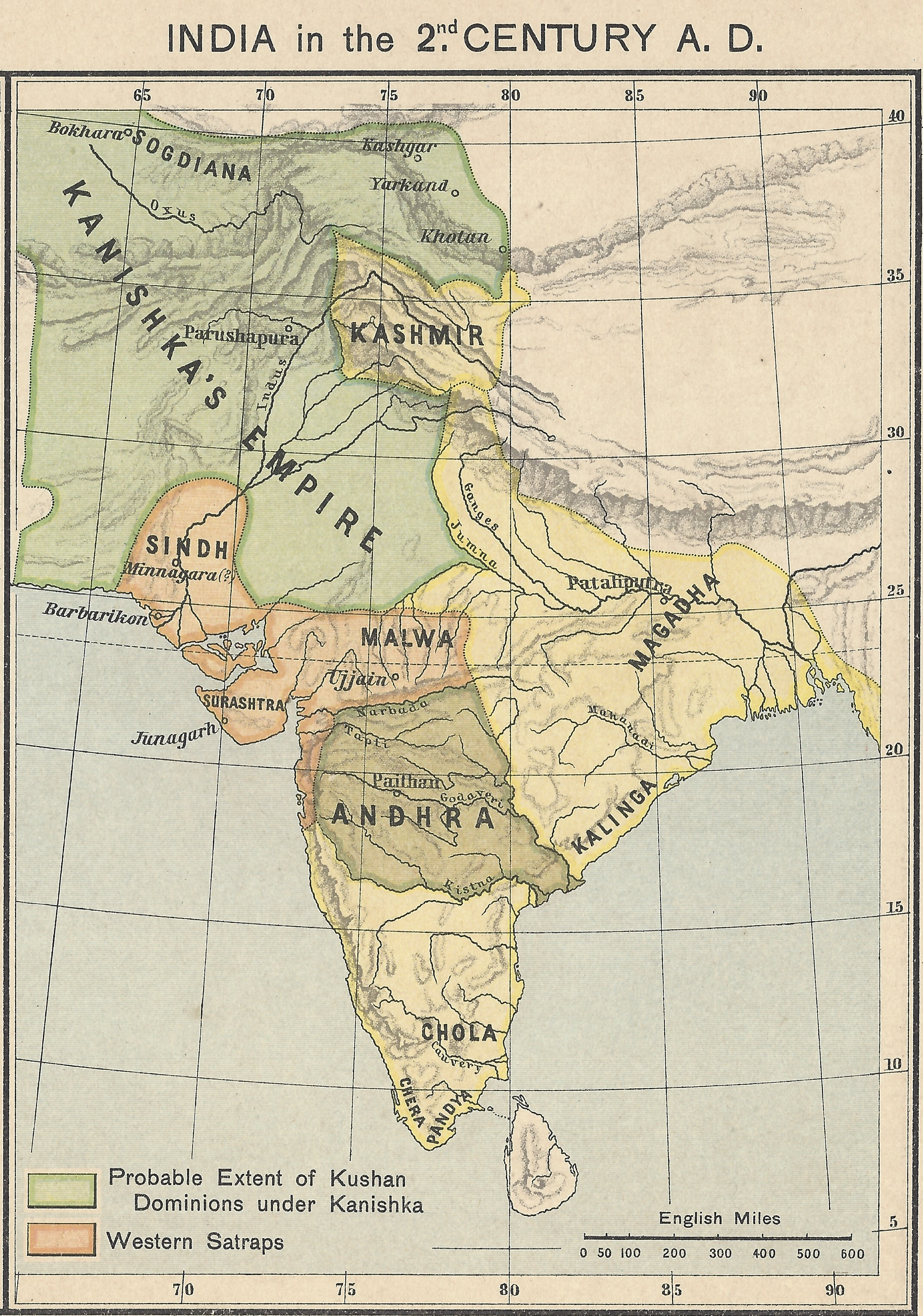
The city of Puruṣapura (modern Peshawar) was established near the ancient Gandharan capital city of Puṣkalāvatī

Historical affiliations

Gandhara Kingdom (538 – 518 BC)
Achaemenid Empire (518 – 326 BC)
Macedonian Empire (326 – 312 BCE)
Seleucid Empire (312 – 303 BC)
Maurya Empire (303 – 185 BC)
Indo-Greek Kingdom (185 – 85 BC)
Indo-Scythian Kingdom (85 – 60 BC)
Indo-Greek Kingdom (60 – 48 BC)
Indo-Scythian Kingdom (48 BC – 20 CE)
Indo-Parthian Kingdom (20 – 60 CE)
Kushan Empire (60 – 242 CE)
Sassanid Empire/ Kushano-Sasanian Kingdom (242 – 360 CE)
Gupta Empire (360 – 410 CE)
Kidarite Kingdom (410 – 465)
Alchon Kingdom (465 – 560)
Alchon—Nezak Kingdom (560 – 665)
Turk Shahi Kingdom (665 – 843)
Hindu Shahi Kingdom (843 – 1001)
Ghaznavid Empire (1001 – 1180)
Ghurid Empire (1180 – 1206)
Qabacha State (1206 – 1214)
Yildiz State (1214 – 1215)
Khwarazmian Empire (1215 – 1221)
Mongol Empire (1221 – 1221)
Khwarazmian Empire (1221 – 1224)
Mongol Empire (1224 – 1226)
Khwarazmian Empire (1226 – 1228)
Delhi Sultanate (1228 – 1241)
Chagatai Khanate (1241 – 1307)
Delhi Sultanate (1307 – 1398)
Timurid Empire (1398 – 1414)
Delhi Sultanate (1414 – 1526)
Mughal Empire (1526 – 1540)
Sur Empire (1540 – 1555)
Mughal Empire (1555 – 1586)
Roshani movement (1586 – 1587)
Mughal Empire (1587 – 1738)
Afsharid Empire (1738 – 1747)
Durrani Empire (1747 – 1758)
Maratha Empire (1758 – 1759)
Durrani Empire (1759 – 1818)
Sikh Empire (1818 – 1849)
East India Company (1849 – 1858)
British Raj (1858 – 1947)
Pakistan (1947 – present)

=== Ancient history ===
==== Foundation ====
Peshawar was established as the city of Puruṣapura, on the Gandhara Plains in the broad Peshawar Valley, after the 100 CE. It may have been named after a Hindu raja, who ruled the city, known as Purush. The city likely first existed as a small village in the 5th century BCE, near the ancient Gandhāran capital city of Puṣkalāvatī, near present-day Charsadda.

==== Greek invasion ====
In the winter of 327–26 BCE, Alexander the Great subdued Gandhāra during his invasion of the Indus Valley, as well as the nearby Swat and Buner valleys. Following Alexander's conquest, the Peshawar Valley came under the suzerainty of Seleucus I Nicator, founder of the Seleucid Empire. A locally made vase fragment that was found in Peshawar depicts a scene from Sophocles' play Antigone.

==== Mauryan Empire ====
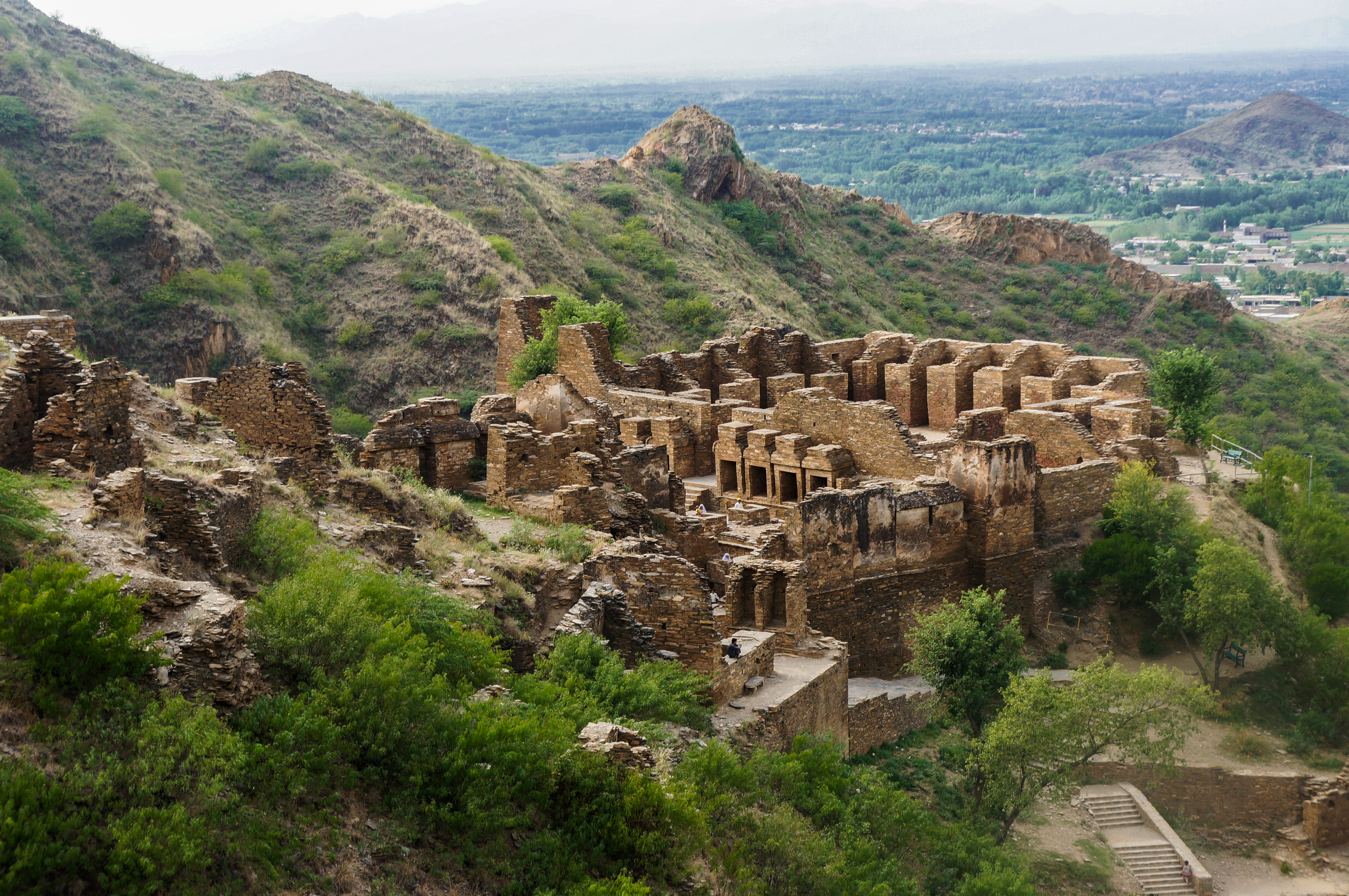
The nearby Takht-i-Bahi monastery was established in 46 CE, and was once a major centre of Buddhist learning.

Following the Seleucid–Mauryan war, the region was ceded to the Mauryan Empire in 303 BCE. Around 300 BCE, the Greek diplomat and historian Megasthenes noted that Puruṣapura was the western terminus of a Mauryan road that connected the city to the empire's capital at Pataliputra, near the city of Patna in the modern-day Indian state of Bihar.

As Mauryan power declined, the Greco-Bactrian Kingdom based in modern Afghanistan declared its independence from the Seleucid Empire, and quickly seized the region around 190 BCE. The city was then captured by Gondophares, founder of the Indo-Parthian Kingdom. Gondophares established the nearby Takht-i-Bahi monastery in 46 CE.

==== Kushan empire ====
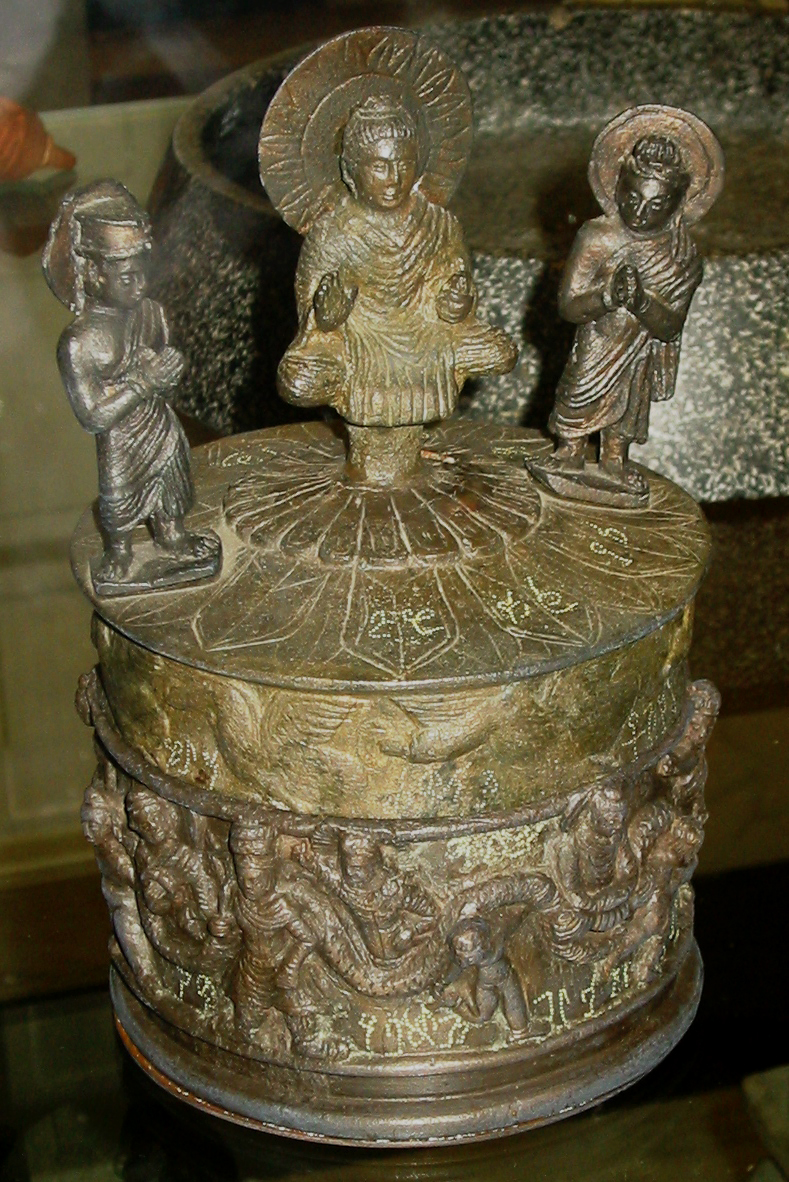
Peshawar's Kanishka Stupa once kept sacred Buddhist relics in the Kanishka Casket.

In the first century CE, Puruṣapura came under control of Kujula Kadphises, founder of the Kushan Empire. It was made the empire's winter capital. The Kushan's summer capital at Kapisi (modern Bagram, Afghanistan) was seen as the secondary capital of the empire, while Puruṣapura was considered to be the empire's primary capital. Puruṣapura's population was estimated to be 120,000, which would make it the seventh-most populous city in the world at the time. As a devout Buddhist, the emperor built the grand Kanishka Mahavihara monastery. After his death, the magnificent Kanishka Stupa was built in Peshawar to house Buddhist relics. The golden age of Kushan empire in Peshawar ended in 232 CE with the death of the last great Kushan king, Vasudeva I.

Around 260 CE, the armies of the Sasanian emperor Shapur I launched an attack on Peshawar, and severely damaged Buddhist monuments and monasteries throughout the Valley of Peshawar. Shapur's campaign also resulted in damage to the city's monumental stupa and monastery. The Kushans became subordinate to the Sasanians and their power rapidly dwindled, as the Sasanians blocked lucrative trade routes westward out of the city.

Kushan emperor Kanishka III was able to temporarily reestablish control over the entire Valley of Peshawar after Shapur's invasion, but the city was then captured by the Central Asian Kidarite kingdom in the early 400s CE.

==== White Huns ====
The White Huns devastated ancient Peshawar in the 460s CE, and ravaged the entire region of Gandhara, destroying its numerous monasteries. The Kanishka stupa was rebuilt during the White Hun era with the construction of a tall wooden superstructure, built atop a stone base, and crowned with a 13-layer copper-gilded chatra. In the 400s CE, the Chinese Buddhist pilgrim Faxian visited the structure and described it as "the highest of all the towers" in the "terrestrial world", which ancient travelers claimed was up to 560 ft (170 m) tall, though modern estimates suggest a height of 400 ft (120 m).

In 520 CE the Chinese monk Song Yun visited Gandhara and ancient Peshawar during the White Hun era, and noted that it was in conflict with nearby Kapisa. The Chinese monk and traveler Xuanzang visited ancient Peshawar around 630 CE, after Kapisa victory, and expressed lament that the city and its great Buddhist monuments had decayed to ruin — although some monks studying Theravada Buddhism continued to study at the monastery's ruins. Xuanzang estimated that only about 1,000 families continued in a small quarter among the ruins of the former grand capital.

=== Medieval history ===
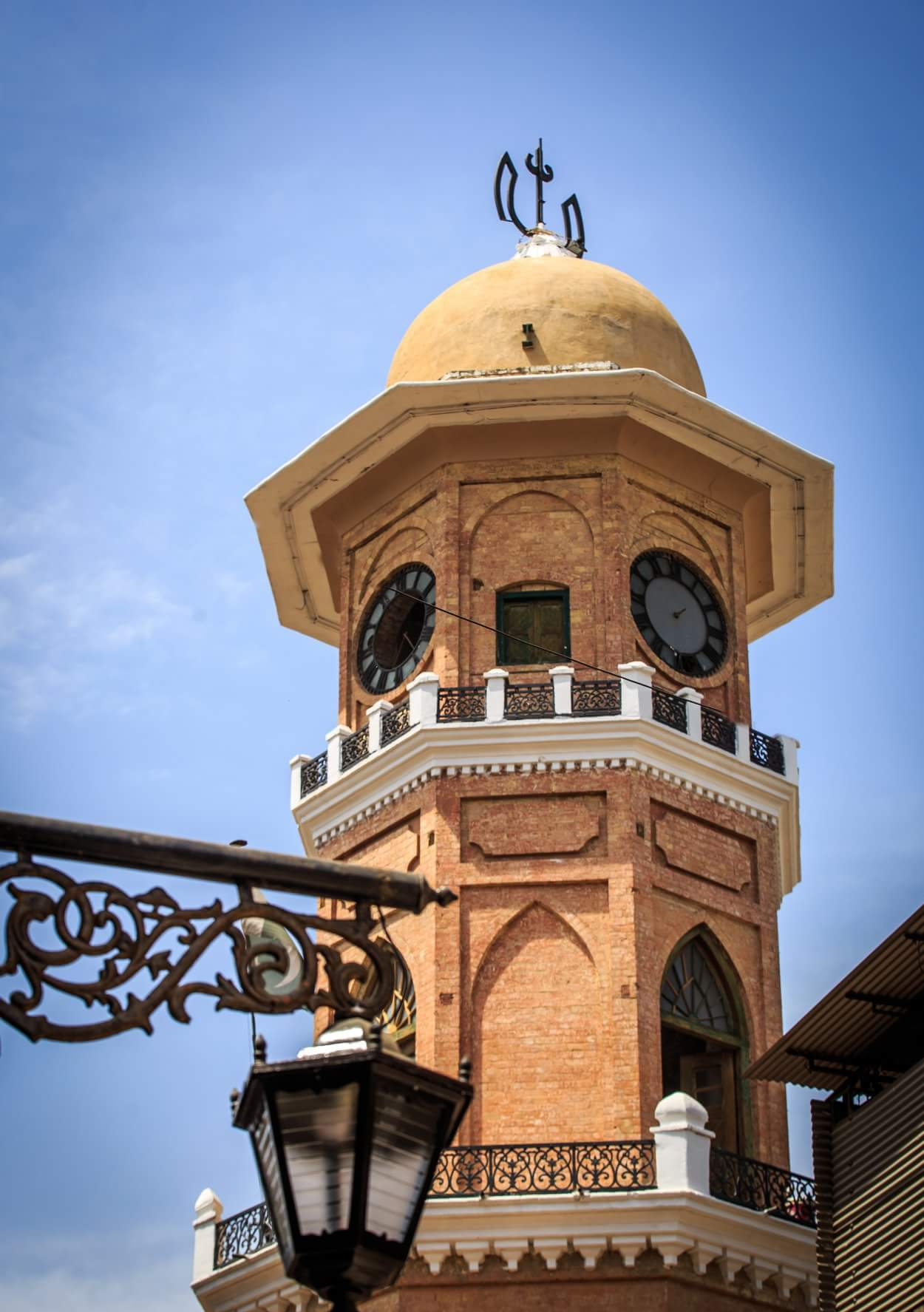
Clock Tower Peshawar

Until the mid-seventh century, the residents of ancient Peshawar were ruled by Kabul Shahis, who were then displaced by the Hindu Shahis of Kabul. Islam is believed to have been first introduced to the Buddhist, Hindu and other indigenous inhabitants of Puruṣapura in the later seventh century.

==== Ghaznavid empire ====
In 986–87 CE, Peshawar's first encounter with Muslim armies occurred when Sabuktigin invaded the area and fought the Hindu Shahis under their king, Anandpal.

On 28 November 1001, Sabuktigin's son Mahmud Ghazni decisively defeated the army of Jayapala, at the Battle of Peshawar, and established rule of the Ghaznavid Empire in the Peshawar Valley. During the Ghaznavid era, Peshawar served as an important stop between the Afghan plateau, and the Ghaznavid garrison city of Lahore. During the 10th–12th century, Peshawar served as a headquarters for Hindu Nath Panthi Yogis, who in turn are believed to have extensively interacted with Muslim Sufi mystics.

As the first Pashtun tribe to settle in the region, the Dilazak tribe began settling in the Valley of Peshawar, and are believed to have settled regions up to the Indus River by the 11th century. The Arab historian and geographer al-Masudi noted that by the mid tenth century, the city had become known as Parashāwar.

==== Delhi sultanate ====
In 1179–80, Muhammad Ghori captured Peshawar, though the city was then destroyed in the early 1200s at the hands of the Mongols. Several other Pashtun tribe began settling rural regions around Peshawar in the late 15th and 16th centuries. The Ghoryakhel and Khashikhel tribes pushed the Dilazaks east of the Indus River following a battle in 1515 near the city of Mardan. Hindko continued to be the language of trade and business in the city.

=== Early modern history ===
==== Mughal Empire ====
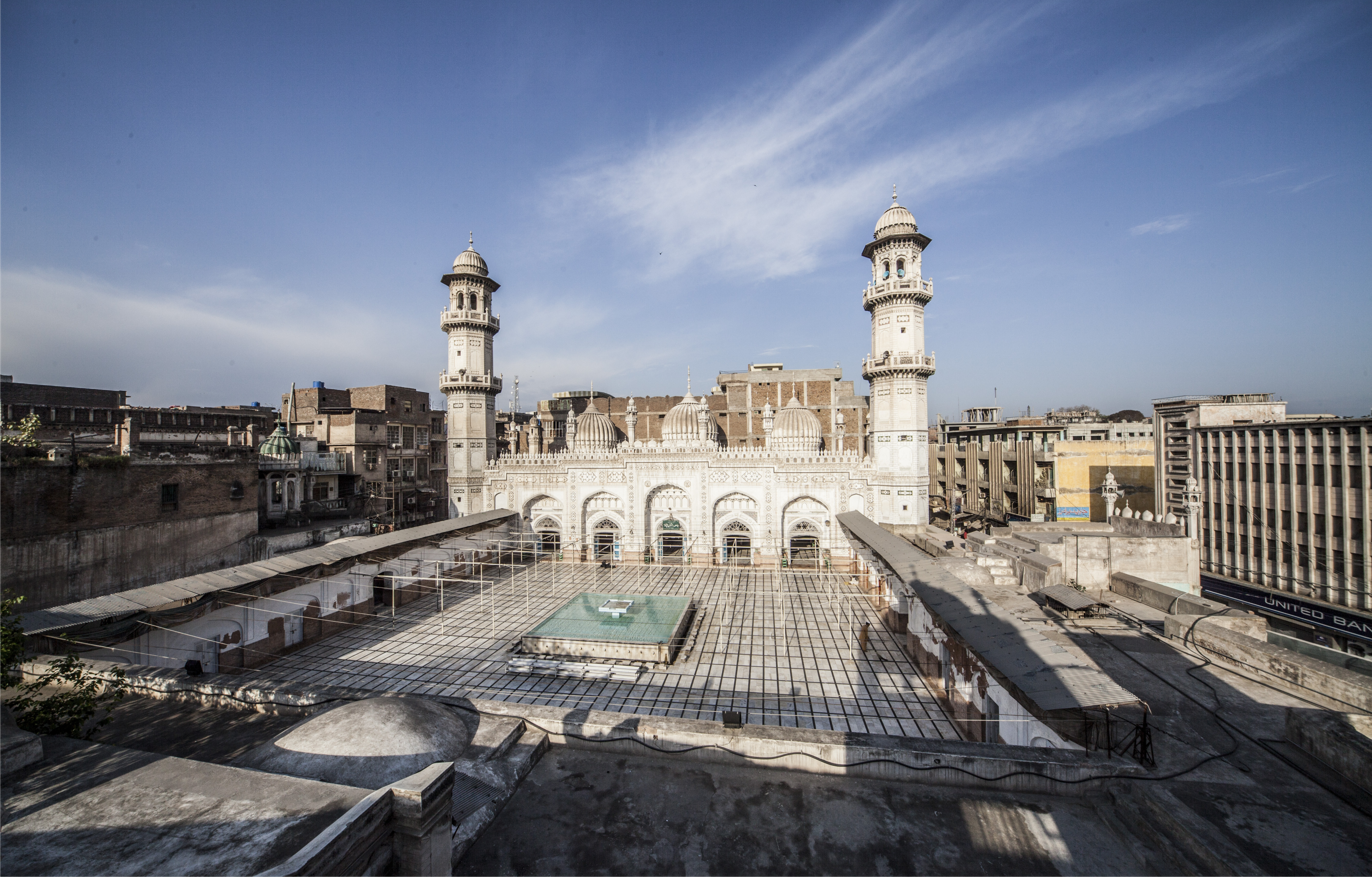
Built by Mohabbat Khan, the Mughal governor in 1630, the white-marble façade of the Mohabbat Khan Mosque is one of Peshawar's iconic sights.

In July 1526, emperor Babur captured Peshawar. During Babur's rule, the city was known as Begram, and he rebuilt the city's fort. Babur used the city as a base for expeditions to other nearby towns. Peshawar remained an important centre on trade routes between India and Central Asia during Mughal period. The Peshawar Valley was a cosmopolitan region in which goods, peoples, and ideas would pass along trade routes. Its importance as a trade centre is highlighted by the destruction of over one thousand camel-loads of merchandise following an accidental fire at Bala Hissar fort in 1586. Under the reign of Babur's son, Humayun, direct Mughal rule over the city was briefly challenged with the rise of the Pashtun king, Sher Shah Suri, who began construction of the famous Grand Trunk Road in the 16th century. Mughal rule in the area was tenuous, as Mughal suzerainty was only firmly exercised in the Peshawar Valley, while the neighbouring valley of Swat came under Mughal rule only during the reign of Akbar.

Peshawar was an important trading centre on the Grand Trunk Road. During Akbar's rule, the name of the city changed from Begram to Peshawar. In 1586, Pashtuns rose against Mughal rule during the Roshani Revolt under the leadership of Pir Roshan, founder of the egalitarian Roshani movement, who assembled Pashtun armies in an attempted rebellion against the Mughals. The Roshani followers laid siege to the city until 1587.

Peshawar was bestowed with its own set of Shalimar Gardens during the reign of Shah Jahan, which no longer exist. Emperor Aurangzeb's governor of Kabul, Mohabbat Khan used Peshawar as his winter capital during the 17th century, and built in the city its famous Mohabbat Khan Mosque in 1630.

Yusufzai tribes rose against Mughal rule during the Yusufzai Revolt of 1667, and engaged in pitched-battles with Mughal battalions nearby Attock. Afridi tribes resisted Mughal rule during the Afridi Revolt of the 1670s. The Afridis massacred a Mughal battalion in the nearby Khyber Pass in 1672 and shut the pass to lucrative trade routes. Mughal armies led by Emperor Aurangzeb himself regained control of the entire area in 1674.

Following the death of Aurangzeb in 1707, his son Bahadur Shah I, former governor of Peshawar and Kabul, became the new Mughal emperor. As Mughal power declined following the death of Aurangzeb, the empire's defenses were severely weakened.

On 18 November 1738, Peshawar was captured from the Mughal governor Nawab Nasir Khan by the Afsharid armies during the Persian invasion of the Mughal Empire under Nader Shah.

==== Durrani Empire ====
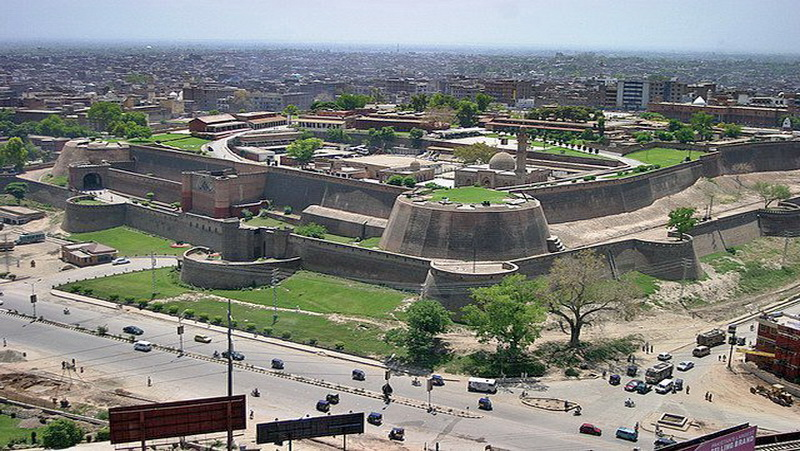
Peshawar's Bala Hissar fort was once the royal residence of the Durrani Afghan kings.

In 1747, Peshawar was taken by Ahmad Shah Durrani, founder of the Afghan Durrani Empire. The city was captured in spring of 1758 by the Maratha Confederacy in alliance with the Sikhs. Before that, the fort of Peshawar was being guarded by Durrani troops under Timur Shah Durrani and Jahan Khan. When Raghunathrao, Malhar Rao Holkar and Sikh alliance of Charat Singh and Jassa Singh Ahluwalia left Peshawar, Tukoji Rao Holkar was appointed as the representative in this area.

In the following year Ahmad Shah again occupied the city. Under the reign of his son Timur Shah, the Mughal practice of using Kabul as a summer capital and Peshawar as a winter capital was reintroduced, with the practice maintained until the Sikh invasion. Peshawar's Bala Hissar Fort served as the residence of Afghan kings during their winter stay in Peshawar, and it was noted to be the main centre of trade between Bukhara and India by British explorer William Moorcroft during the late 1700s. Peshawar was at the centre of a productive agricultural region that provided much of north India's dried fruit.

Timur Shah's grandson, Mahmud Shah Durrani, became king, and quickly seized Peshawar from his half-brother, Shah Shuja Durrani. Shah Shujah was then himself proclaimed king in 1803, and recaptured Peshawar while Mahmud Shah was imprisoned at Bala Hissar fort until his eventual escape. In 1809, the British sent an emissary to the court of Shah Shujah in Peshawar, marking the first diplomatic meeting between the British and Afghans. His half-brother Mahmud Shah then allied himself with the Barakzai Pashtuns, and captured Peshawar once again and reigned until the Battle of Nowshera in March 1823.

==== Sikh Empire ====
Ranjit Singh invaded Peshawar in 1818, but handed its rule to Peshawar Sardars as vassals. Following the Sikh victory against Azim Khan at the Nowshera in March 1823, Ranjit Singh captured Peshawar again and reinstated Yar Mohammed as the governor. By 1830, Peshawar's economy was noted by Scottish explorer Alexander Burnes to have sharply declined, with Ranjit Singh's forces having destroyed the city's palace and agricultural fields.

Much of Peshawar's caravan trade from Kabul ceased on account of skirmishes between Afghan and Sikh forces, as well as a punitive tax levied on merchants by Ranjit Singh's forces. Singh's government also required Peshawar to forfeit much of its leftover agricultural output to the Sikhs as tribute, while agriculture was further decimated by a collapse of the dried fruit market in north India. Singh appointed Neapolitan mercenary Paolo Avitabile as administrator of Peshawar, who is remembered for having unleashed a reign of terror. His time in Peshawar is known as a time of "gallows and gibbets". The city's famous Mahabat Khan, built in 1630 in the Jeweler's Bazaar, was badly damaged and desecrated by the Sikh occupation.

The Sikh Empire formally annexed Peshawar in 1834 following advances from the armies of Hari Singh Nalwa — bringing the city under direct control of the Sikh Empire's Lahore Durbar. An 1835 attempt by Dost Muhammad Khan to re-occupy the city was unsuccessful after being unable to breach the Peshawar fort's defenses. Sikh settlers from Punjab were settled in the city during Sikh rule. The city's only remaining Gurdwaras were built by Hari Singh Nalwa to accommodate the newly settled Sikhs. The Sikhs also rebuilt the Bala Hissar fort during their occupation of the city.

==== British Raj ====
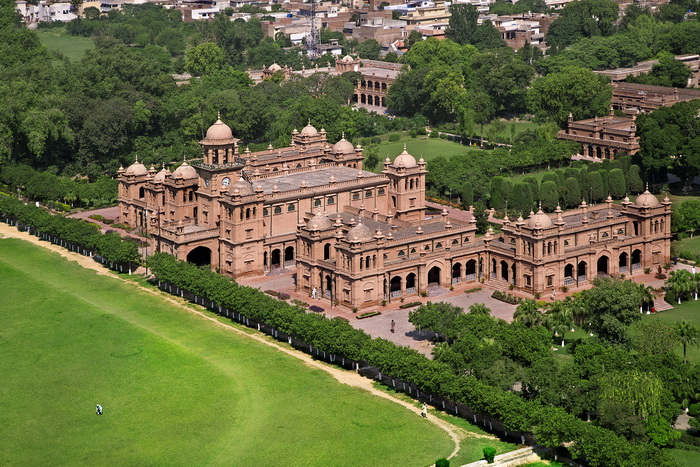
The British-era Islamia College was built in an Indo-Saracenic Revival style.

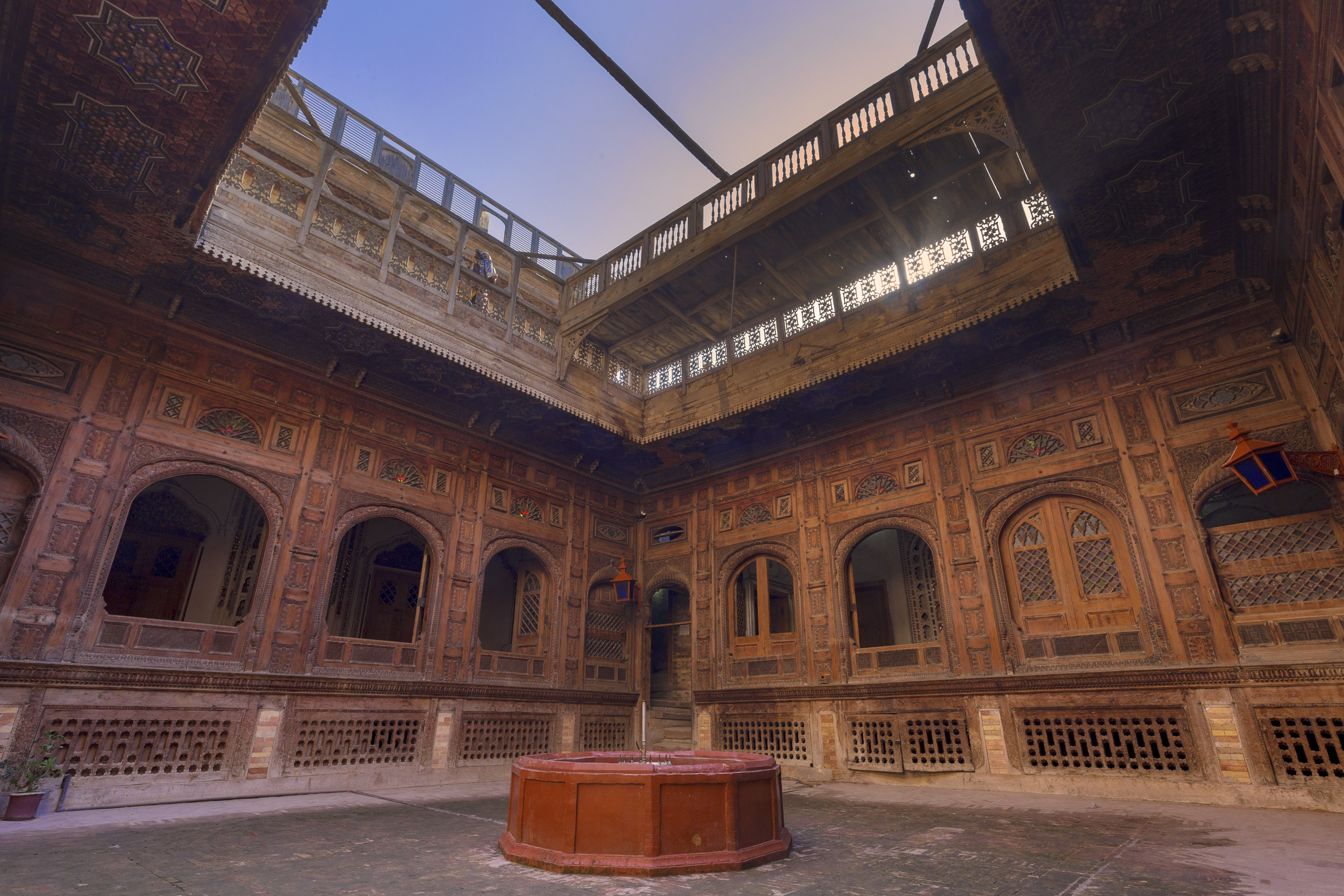
Built for wealthy Peshawari merchants in a Central Asian architectural style, the Sethi Mohallah features several homes dating from the British era.

Following the defeat of the Sikhs in the First Anglo-Sikh War in 1845–46 and the Second Anglo-Sikh War in 1849, some of their territories were captured by the British East India Company. The British re-established stability in the wake of ruinous Sikh rule. During the Sepoy Rebellion of 1857, the 4,000 members of the native garrison were disarmed without bloodshed; the absence of conflict during the rebellion meant that Peshawar was not affected by the widespread devastation that was experienced throughout the rest of British India and local chieftains sided with the British after the incident.

The British laid out the vast Peshawar Cantonment to the west of the city in 1868, and made the city its frontier headquarters. Additionally, several projects were initiated in Peshawar, including linkage of the city by railway to the rest of British India and renovation of the Mohabbat Khan mosque that had been desecrated by the Sikhs. British suzerainty over regions west of Peshawar was cemented in 1893 by Sir Mortimer Durand, foreign secretary of the British Indian government, who collaboratively demarcated the border between British controlled territories in India and Afghanistan.

The British built Cunningham clock tower in celebration of the Golden Jubilee of Queen Victoria, and in 1906 built the Victoria Hall (now home of the Peshawar Museum) in memory of Queen Victoria. The British introduced Western-style education into Peshawar with the establishment of Edwardes College and Islamia College in 1901 and 1913, along with several schools run by the Anglican Church. For better administration of the region, Peshawar and the adjoining districts were separated from the Punjab Province in 1901; the North-West Frontier Province was separated from Punjab Province in 1901, after which Peshawar became capital of the new province.

Communal riots broke out in the old city of Peshawar during the spring of 1910, when the annual Hindu festival of Holi coincided with Barawafat, the annual Muslim day of mourning, resulting in a considerable loss of life along with hundreds of looted businesses and injuries. (Note: "The date of the Hindu festival of Holi coincided with Barawafat, the Musalman day of mourning, in 1910, which led to a very serious riot between the Hindus and Musalmans of the Peshawar City resulting in a considerable loss of life. There was a wholescale plunder of Hindu houses and shops.") A month prior, in February 1910, prominent community religious leaders met with officials and agreed that Holi would be solely celebrated in predominantly Hindu neighbourhoods of the city, notably in Andar Shehr and Karim Pura. (Note: "On 22nd February 1910, a meeting of leading Muslims and Hindu leaders was called by deputy commissioner of Peshawar at the Municipal Hall in which arrangements regarding the upcoming festivals were discussed and a committee was established consisting of prominent leaders from both sides. It was decided in the meeting that the Holi should be celebrated quietly until the 25th March. There should be only two processions, namely from the Hindu quarter of Andar Shahr to that of Karimpura and vice-versa. The Muslim of the city should not join the procession and the troops should celebrate Holi in their lines and some leading men from both sides will supervise the arrangement at Hasting Memorial and other at Clock Tower.") On 21 March 1910, however, rumors of musicians from Amritsar and a dancing boy from Haripur being brought into the city for Holi celebrations, led to a group of individuals who were marking Barawafat into forming a mob with the intention of stopping the procession. (Note: On 21 March the Deputy Commissioner was informed by deputy superintendent of police Zain ul Abidin that the situation in the city is not good as Hindu brought some musicians from Amritsar and a dancing boy from Hari Pur and they are intending to lead the procession on an unauthorized route. The superintendent of police suggested the deputy commissioner that the Holi should not be allowed as the situations going to create clash. Mr. Blackway sent some Hindu leader to enquire the situation. These Hindu gentlemen assured the deputy commissioner that the situation is friendly and nothing bad is going to be happened. There is no musician with the Holi and it would follow the old route. At the same time some Muslim leaders reported to the deputy commissioner about the Muslim mob who intended to stop the Holi procession. They also suggested that Holi procession should be stopped to avoid an expected clash between the two communities. However, after the surety of the Hindu leaders that there are no musicians and dancing boys and that the procession is not going on an unauthorized route the deputy commissioner was stuck to follow his old plan. This was the point which was misunderstood and created communal violence in the city.) Despite Muslim and Hindu community leaders calling for calm, both parties ultimately clashed at the Asamai Gate, when the Holi procession was en route to Dargah Pir Ratan Nath Jee, with a Hindu procession member stabbing a Muslim individual in the mob. (Note: Around 8 pm when the Holi procession at Asa Mai gate was about to depart on the route to Pir Rathan Nath Dharamshala sub inspector Kanhya Lal who was posted at Chita Khuo informed the police head quarter that a mob of Muslim also assembled to stop it and the two mobs started abusing each other. Leaders from both sides tried to control the situation but the people from both sides refused to pay any heed to their leaders. Meanwhile, a Hindu Mahr Singh stabbed a Muslim with knife. Mahr Singh was chased by the mob and captured him at Bara Bazar. At the same time two Muslims Jani and Ahmad were killed by Hindu with knives. Police report for 21 March 1911, provides that two Muslim were killed and three wounded while from Hindu side two people were killed and eleven were wounded and eleven shops were broken.) Riots ensued for the following three days, involved individuals from outlying tribal regions who had entered the city, with a mob at Bara Bazar allegedly chanting "Maro Hindu Ko" (Kill the Hindus). (Note: When the funeral party was ousted from the city a riffraff of Muslim consisting of people from trans-border areas and Afghanistan remained in the city that started plundering and broke 285 shops. A violent clash was started in which two Hindus and one Muslim was killed... The next day on 23 March the looting of shops started again. The first case was reported in Ramdas Bazar where the Muslim despite the Military and Police patrolling looted the Hindu shops. A Hindu, reader of Nawab of Landi fired and wounded two Muslim. The local Hindu during investigation denied the fact but Military intelligence reported that he fired and wounded two people. He was arrested and sent on trial under India Penal Code. Two Hindu were killed at Ram Das Bazar. It was also reported that in Mewa Mandi a mob of Afridi and Mohmand tribes started plundering and looted many shops. People from tribal areas were also involved in this looting. 11 shops were broken in Ram Das Bazar that day... The official records about the events of the day had self-contradictory statements. The starting paragraphs of police and commissioner reports claims that everything was good at the start of the day but after a while the situation was out of control in the whole city. For instance, police reports provides that around 10:00 am, in Karimpura a police constable Chettan Ram was struck on head and the mob at Bara Bazar started the slogan "Maro Hindu Ko".) Estimates detail the riots resulted in a total of 451 damaged shops and homes, primarily belonging to members of the Hindu community, while at least 4 Muslims and 6 Hindus were killed, alongside hundreds of injuries.

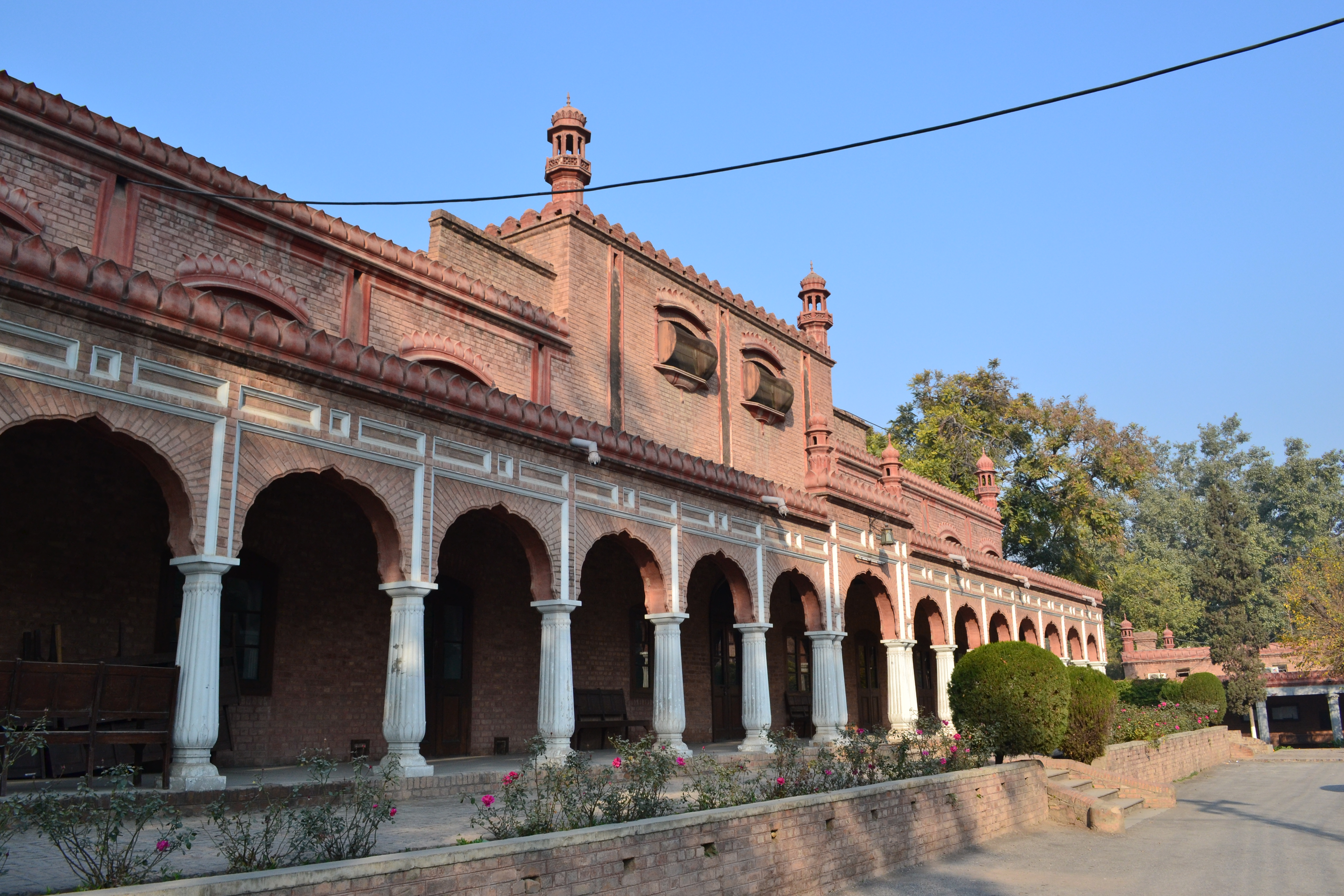
Edwardes College was built during the British-era, and is now one of Peshawar's most prestigious educational institutions.

Peshawar emerged as a centre for both Hindkowan and Pashtun intellectuals during the British era. Hindko speakers, known as Peshoris, were responsible for the dominant culture for most of the time that Peshawar was under British rule. Peshawar was also home to a non-violent resistance movement led by Ghaffar Khan, a disciple of Mahatma Gandhi. In April 1930, Khan, leading a large group of his followers, protested in Qissa Khwani Bazaar against discriminatory laws that had been enacted by the colonial government; hundreds were killed when a detachment of the British Indian Army opened fire on the demonstrators.

=== Modern era ===
In 1947, Peshawar became part of the newly created state of Pakistan, and emerged as a cultural centre in the country's northwest. The partition of India saw the departure of many Hindko-speaking Hindus and Sikhs who held key positions in the economy of Peshawar, weakening the historical presence of Hindko language in the city. The University of Peshawar was established in the city in 1950, and augmented by the amalgamation of nearby British-era institutions into the university. Until the mid-1950s, Peshawar was enclosed within a city wall and sixteen gates. In the 1960s, Peshawar was a base for a CIA operation to spy on the Soviet Union, with the 1960 U-2 incident resulting in an aircraft shot down by the Soviets that flew from Peshawar. From the 1960s until the late 1970s, Peshawar was a major stop on the famous Hippie trail.

During the Soviet–Afghan War in the 1980s, Peshawar served as a political centre for the CIA and the Inter-Services Intelligence-trained mujahideen groups based in the camps of Afghan refugees. It also served as the primary destination for large numbers of Afghan refugees. By 1980, 100,000 refugees a month were entering the province, with 25% of all refugees living in Peshawar district in 1981. The arrival of large numbers of Afghan refugees strained Peshawar's infrastructure, and drastically altered the city's demography.

Like much of northwest Pakistan, Peshawar has been severely affected by violence from the attacks by the terrorist group, Tehrik-i-Taliban. Local poets' shrines have been targeted by the Pakistani Taliban, a suicide bomb attack targeted the historic All Saints Church in 2013, and most notably the 2014 Peshawar school massacre in which Taliban militants killed 132 school children. Peshawar suffered 111 acts of terror in 2010, which had declined to 18 in 2014, before the launch of Operation Zarb-e-Azb, which further reduced acts of violence throughout Pakistan. A large attack on a Shiite mosque in the city killed dozens and injured 200 people on 4 March 2022. In January 2023, another terrorist attack occurred at Peshawar in which 100 people were killed.

== Geography ==
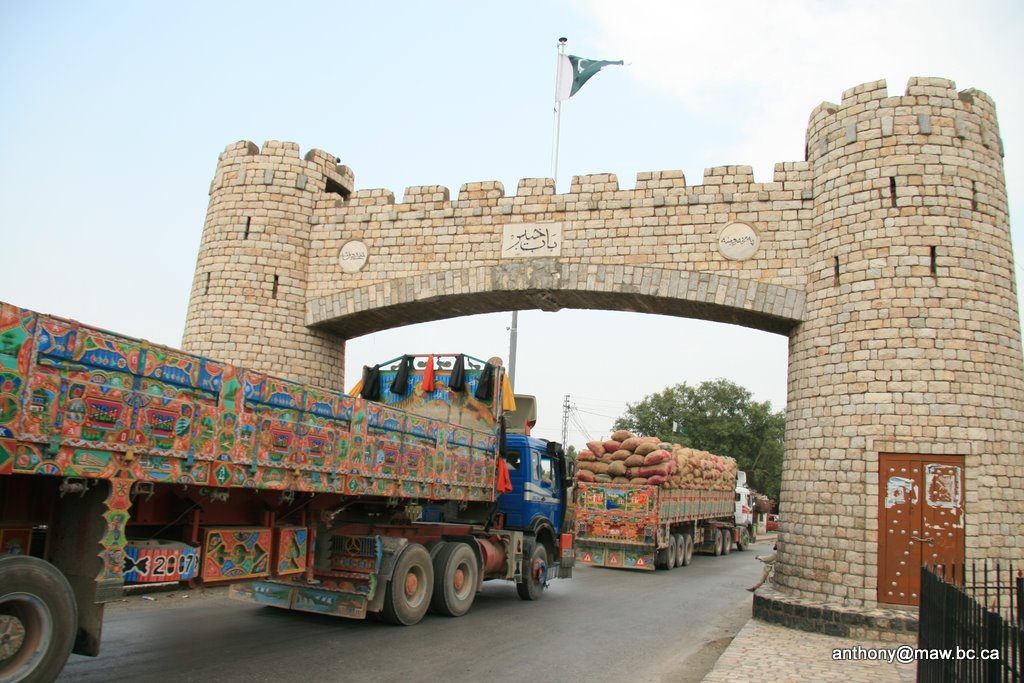
The city serves as a gateway to the Khyber Pass, whose beginning is marked by the Khyber Gate.

=== Topography ===
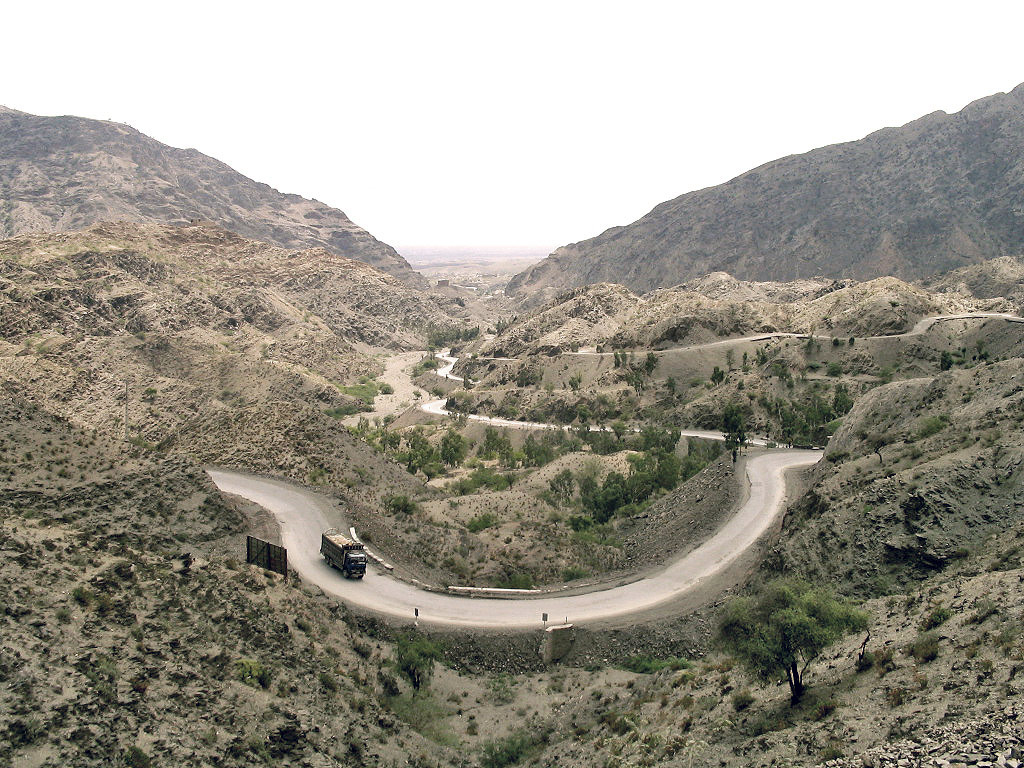
Peshawar sits at the eastern end of the Khyber Pass, which has been used as a trade route since the Kushan era approximately 2,000 years ago.

Peshawar is located in the broad Valley of Peshawar, which is surrounded by mountain ranges on three sides, with the fourth opening to the Punjab plains. The city is located in the generally level base of the valley, known as the Gandhara Plains.

=== Climate ===
Peshawar features a hot semi-arid climate (Köppen BSh), with very hot, prolonged summers and brief, mild to cool winters. Winter in Peshawar starts in November and ends in late March, though it sometimes extends into mid-April, while the summer months are from mid-May to mid-September. The mean maximum summer temperature surpasses 40 °C (104 °F) during the hottest month, and the mean minimum temperature is 25 °C (77 °F). The mean minimum temperature during the coolest month is 4 °C (39.2 °F), while the maximum is 18.3 °C (64.9 °F).

Peshawar is not a monsoon region, unlike other parts of Pakistan; however, rainfall occurs in both winter and summer. Due to western disturbances, winter rainfall peaks between the months of February and April. The highest amount of winter rainfall, measuring 236 mm (9.3 in), was recorded in February 2007, while the highest summer rainfall of 402 mm (15.8 in) was recorded in July 2010; during this month, a record-breaking rainfall level of 274 mm (10.8 in) fell within a 24-hour period on 29 July 2010—the previous record was 187 mm (7.4 in) of rain, recorded in April 2009. The average winter rainfall levels are higher than those of summer. Based on a 30-year record, the average annual precipitation level was recorded as 400 mm (16 in) and the highest annual rainfall level of 904.5 mm (35.61 in) was recorded in 2003. Wind speeds vary during the year, from 5 kn (5.8 mph; 9.3 km/h) in December to 24 kn (28 mph; 44 km/h) in June. The relative humidity varies from 46% in June to 76% in August. The highest temperature of 50 °C (122 °F) was recorded on 18 June 1995, while the lowest, −3.9 °C (25 °F), occurred on 7 January 1970.

Climate data for Peshawar (1991–2020 normals)
Month	Jan	Feb	Mar	Apr	May	Jun	Jul	Aug	Sep	Oct	Nov	Dec	Year
Record high °C (°F)	27.0 (80.6)	30.0 (86.0)	37.5 (99.5)	42.4 (108.3)	45.2 (113.4)	48.0 (118.4)	46.6 (115.9)	46.0 (114.8)	42.0 (107.6)	38.5 (101.3)	35.0 (95.0)	29.0 (84.2)	48.0 (118.4)
Mean daily maximum °C (°F)	18.1 (64.6)	20.1 (68.2)	24.7 (76.5)	30.6 (87.1)	36.5 (97.7)	39.6 (103.3)	37.4 (99.3)	35.9 (96.6)	34.8 (94.6)	31.0 (87.8)	25.2 (77.4)	20.6 (69.1)	29.5 (85.2)
Daily mean °C (°F)	11.3 (52.3)	13.8 (56.8)	18.2 (64.8)	23.9 (75.0)	29.4 (84.9)	32.7 (90.9)	32.1 (89.8)	30.9 (87.6)	29.0 (84.2)	24.1 (75.4)	17.8 (64.0)	13.2 (55.8)	23.0 (73.5)
Mean daily minimum °C (°F)	4.6 (40.3)	7.6 (45.7)	12.2 (54.0)	17.2 (63.0)	22.3 (72.1)	25.8 (78.4)	26.8 (80.2)	26.0 (78.8)	23.2 (73.8)	17.1 (62.8)	10.4 (50.7)	5.6 (42.1)	16.6 (61.8)
Record low °C (°F)	−3.9 (25.0)	−1.0 (30.2)	1.7 (35.1)	6.7 (44.1)	11.7 (53.1)	13.3 (55.9)	18.0 (64.4)	19.4 (66.9)	12.0 (53.6)	8.3 (46.9)	1.1 (34.0)	−1.3 (29.7)	−3.9 (25.0)
Average precipitation mm (inches)	39.8 (1.57)	69.9 (2.75)	78.2 (3.08)	68.1 (2.68)	26.7 (1.05)	25.4 (1.00)	69.0 (2.72)	68.5 (2.70)	34.8 (1.37)	26.7 (1.05)	16.9 (0.67)	17.3 (0.68)	541.3 (21.32)
Average precipitation days (≥ 1.0 mm)	3.9	5.7	7.6	5.8	4.6	2.1	4.4	5.0	3.0	2.5	2.1	2.1	48.8
Mean monthly sunshine hours	195.5	189.5	194.5	231.3	297.1	299.5	273.8	263.2	257.3	266.1	234.8	184.4	2,887
Source 1: NOAA (sun, 1961–1990)
Source 2: PMD

According to the World Air Quality Report 2024, Peshawar is one of the world's most polluted cities.

=== Cityscape ===
Peshawar's urban typology is similar to other ancient cities in South Asia, such as Lahore, Multan and Delhi – all of which were founded near a major river, and included an old walled city, as well as a royal citadel.

Historically, the old city of Peshawar was a heavily guarded citadel that consisted of high walls. In the 21st century, only remnants of the walls remain, but the houses and havelis continue to be structures of significance. Most of the houses are constructed of unbaked bricks, with the incorporation of wooden structures for protection against earthquakes, with many composed of wooden doors and latticed wooden balconies. Numerous examples of the city's old architecture can still be seen in areas such as Sethi Mohallah. In the old city, located in inner-Peshawar, many historic monuments and bazaars exist in the 21st century, including the Mohabbat Khan Mosque, Kotla Mohsin Khan, Chowk Yadgar and the Qissa Khawani Bazaar. Due to the damage caused by rapid growth and development, the old walled city has been identified as an area that urgently requires restoration and protection.

The walled city was surrounded by several main gates that served as the main entry points into the city — in January 2012, an announcement was made that the government plans to address the damage that has left the gates largely non-existent over time, with all of the gates targeted for restoration.

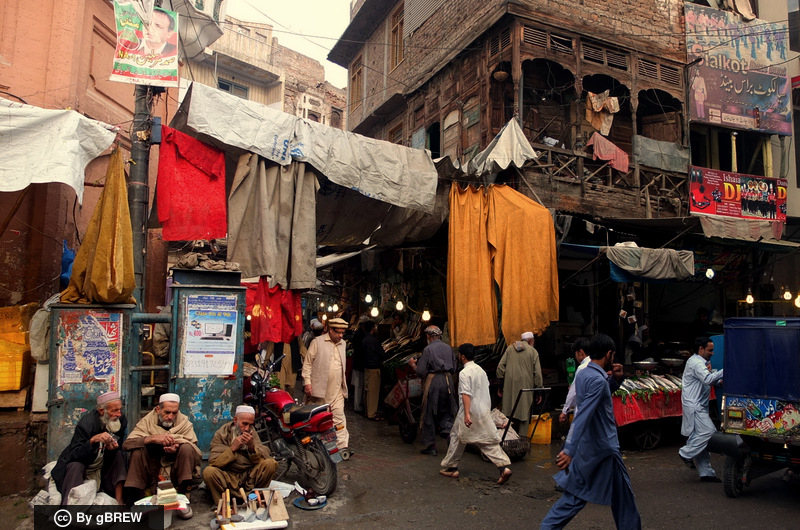
A view of old Peshawar's famous Qissa Khawani Bazaar.

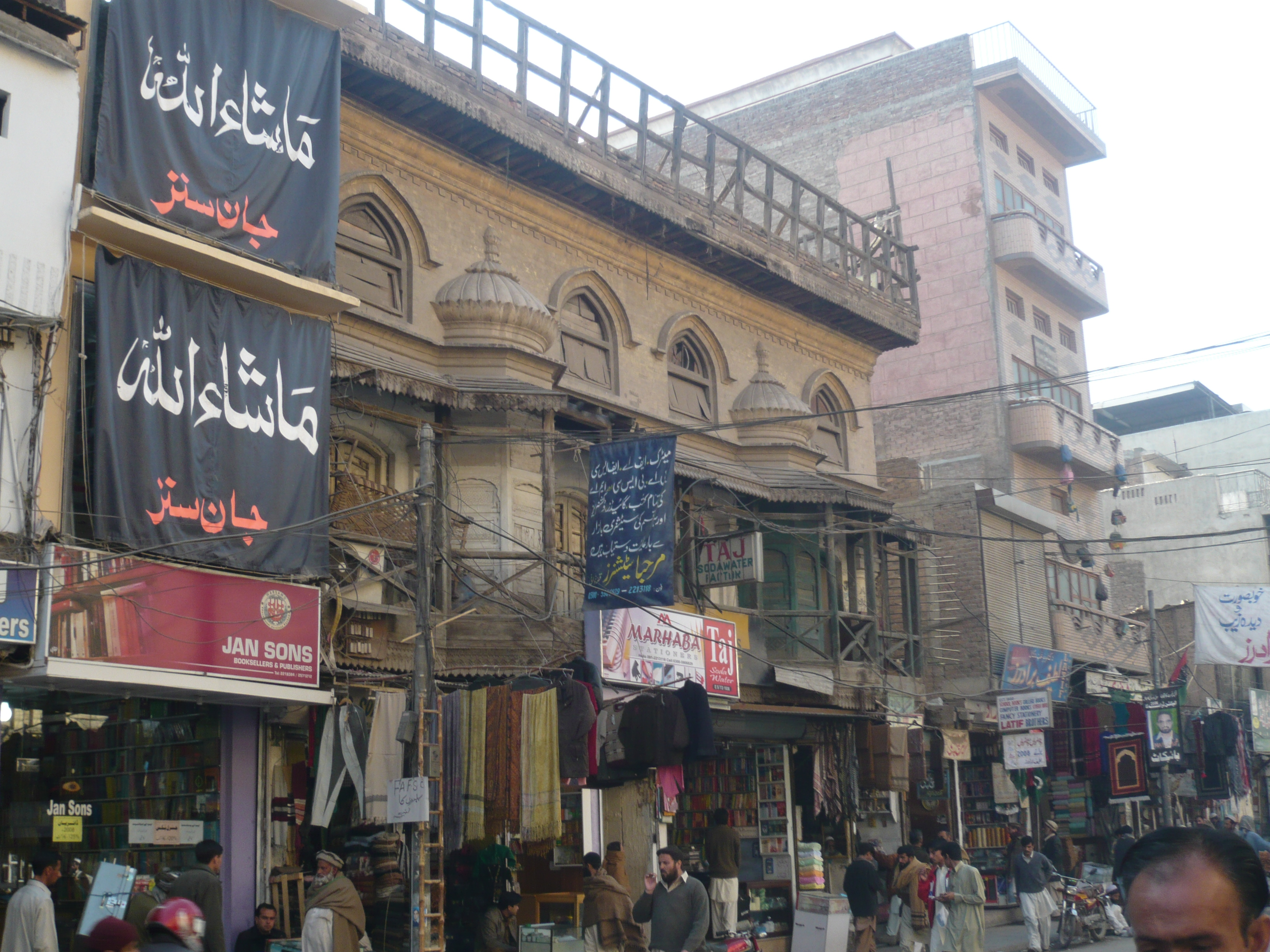
Much of Peshawar's old city still features examples of traditional style architecture.

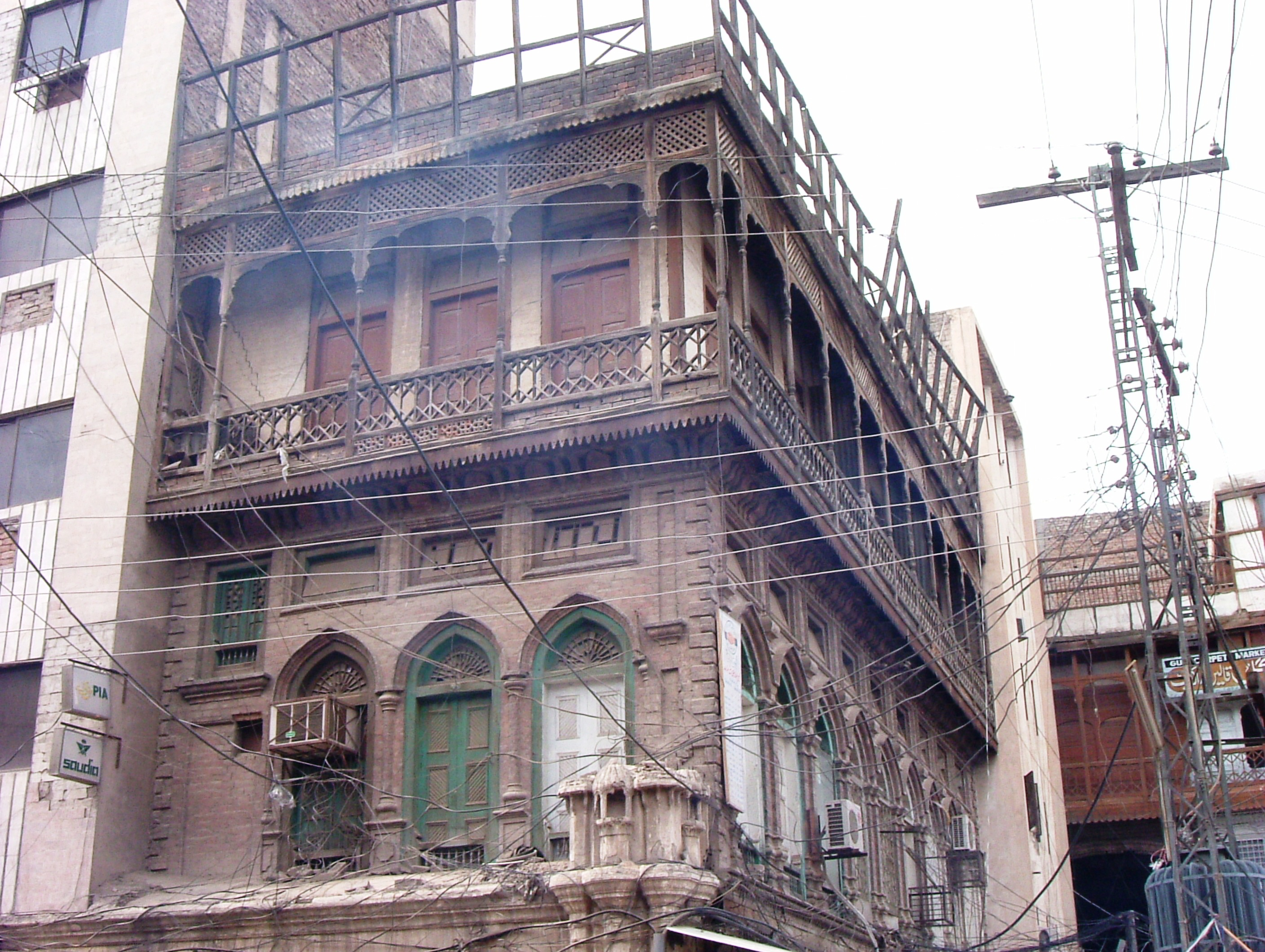
Some buildings in the old city feature carved wooden balconies.

== Demographics ==
Population

Historical population

Year	Pop.	±%
1881	79,982	—
1891	84,191	+5.3%
1901	95,147	+13.0%
1911	97,935	+2.9%
1921	104,452	+6.7%
1931	121,866	+16.7%
1941	173,420	+42.3%

Year	Pop.	±%
1951	151,776	−12.5%
1961	218,000	+43.6%
1972	273,000	+25.2%
1981	555,000	+103.3%
1998	982,816	+77.1%
2017	1,964,102	+99.8%
2023	1,905,975	−3.0%

Source: (Note: 1891–1941: Data for the entirety of the town of Peshawar, which included Peshawar Municipality and Peshawar Cantonment.)
Macrotrends (2021)Census of India (1921)

According to the 2023 census, Peshawar was the 8th largest city of Pakistan and the largest city in Khyber Pakhtunkhwa with a population of 1,905,975. Its population is five times higher than the second-largest city in the province.

Afghan refugees

According to the UNHCR, there were approximately 376,600 registered Afghan refugees in the province of Khyber Pakhtunkhwa. They are being forced to return to Afghanistan. Peshawar has hosted them since the start of the 1980s Soviet–Afghan War. The mass arrival of Afghan refugees in the 1980s eventually strained Peshawar's infrastructure, and drastically altered the city's demography. During the 1988 national elections, an estimated 100,000 Afghan refugees were illegally registered to vote in Peshawar. By 2001, the city became a hub for Afghan musicians and artists, as well as a major centre of Pashto literature. In 2012, it was estimated that Afghans constituted around 28% of the city's total population. The Afghans have played an important role in Peshawar's economy by establishing successful businesses in the city.

Peshoris

Peshawaris, also known as Peshoris, are the Hindko-speaking urban community which has inhabited the city since the ancient period, mostly associated with trade, business and education. Peshoris formed majority in the city until the 1960s. Today they are a minority ethnic group mostly confined to the old neighbourhoods in the Walled City.

Languages

Languages by number of speakers (urban) in the Peshawar Tehsil, 2023
1. Pashto (87.8%)
2. Hindko (5.57%)
3. Urdu (4.11%)
4. Punjabi (1.12%)
5. Others (1.40%)
Languages by number of speakers in the Peshawar City, 1951
1. Pashto (75.3%)
2. Punjabi (Note: Hindko was described under Punjabi in the 1951 census of Pakistan.) (19.5%)
3. Urdu (3.91%)
4. Persian (0.55%)
5. Others (0.75%)

Pashto is the major language spoken in Peshawar city today, while Hindko was historically the language of street, and is still spoken in the Old City. Though English is used in the city's educational institutions, while Urdu is understood throughout the city – as the national language of the country. Hindko speakers in Peshawar increasingly assimilate elements of Pashto and Urdu into their speech.

=== Religion ===
Peshawar is overwhelmingly Muslim, with Muslims making up 98.5% of the city's population in the 1998 census. Christians make up the second largest religious group with around 20,000 adherents, while over 7,000 members of the Ahmadiyya Community live in Peshawar. Hindus and Sikhs are also found in the city − though most of the city's Hindu and Sikh community migrated en masse to India following the Partition of British India in 1947.

Though the city's Sikh population drastically declined after Partition, the Sikh community has been bolstered in Peshawar by the arrival of approximately 4,000 Sikh refugees from conflict in the Federally Administered Tribal Areas; In 2008, the largest Sikh population in Pakistan was located in Peshawar. Sikhs in Peshawar self-identify as Pashtuns and speak Pashto as their mother tongue. There was a small, but, thriving Jewish community until the late 1940s. After the partition and the emergence of the State of Israel, Jews left for Israel.

Religious groups in Peshawar City (1868–2023) (Note: 1868–1941: Data for the entirety of the town of Peshawar, which included Peshawar Municipality and Peshawar Cantonment. 2017–2023: Urban population of Peshawar District.)
Religious group	1868		1881		1891		1901		1911		1921		1931		1941		2017		2023	
Religious group	Pop.	%	Pop.	%	Pop.	%	Pop.	%	Pop.	%	Pop.	%	Pop.	%	Pop.	%	Pop.	%	Pop.	%
Islam	54,977	67.65%	57,378	71.74%	60,269	71.59%	68,352	71.84%	73,198	74.74%	73,882	70.75%	86,369	70.87%	122,972	70.91%	1,942,636	98.62%	1,872,113	98.56%
Hinduism	21,802	26.83%	18,105	22.64%	15,501	18.41%	18,552	19.5%	16,328	16.67%	21,001	20.11%	21,973	18.03%	31,630	18.24%	1,720	0.09%	1,726	0.09%
Christianity	3,379	4.16%	—N/a	—N/a	3,629	4.31%	3,063	3.22%	3,132	3.2%	3,414	3.27%	4,854	3.98%	2,586	1.49%	22,032	1.12%	23,638	1.24%
Sikhism	994	1.22%	1,465	1.83%	4,755	5.65%	5,144	5.41%	5,026	5.13%	6,152	5.89%	8,630	7.08%	14,245	8.21%	—N/a	—N/a	1,441	0.08%
Jainism	—N/a	—N/a	3	0%	0	0%	0	0%	3	0%	3	0%	—N/a	—N/a	—N/a	—N/a	—N/a	—N/a	—N/a	—N/a
Zoroastrianism	—N/a	—N/a	—N/a	—N/a	33	0.04%	34	0.04%	47	0.05%	20	0.02%	29	0.02%	14	0.01%	—N/a	—N/a	0	0%
Judaism	—N/a	—N/a	—N/a	—N/a	4	0%	—N/a	—N/a	1	0%	0	0%	11	0.01%	70	0.04%	—N/a	—N/a	—N/a	—N/a
Buddhism	—N/a	—N/a	—N/a	—N/a	0	0%	0	0%	0	0%	0	0%	—N/a	—N/a	—N/a	—N/a	—N/a	—N/a	—N/a	—N/a
Ahmadiyya	—N/a	—N/a	—N/a	—N/a	—N/a	—N/a	—N/a	—N/a	—N/a	—N/a	—N/a	—N/a	—N/a	—N/a	—N/a	—N/a	924	0.05%	166	0.01%
Others	112	0.14%	3,031	3.79%	0	0%	2	0%	0	0%	0	0%	0	0%	1,903	1.1%	2,511	0.13%	476	0.03%
Total population	81,264	100%	79,982	100%	84,191	100%	95,147	100%	97,935	100%	104,432	100%	121,866	100%	173,420	100%	1,969,823	100%	1,899,560	100%

== Economy ==
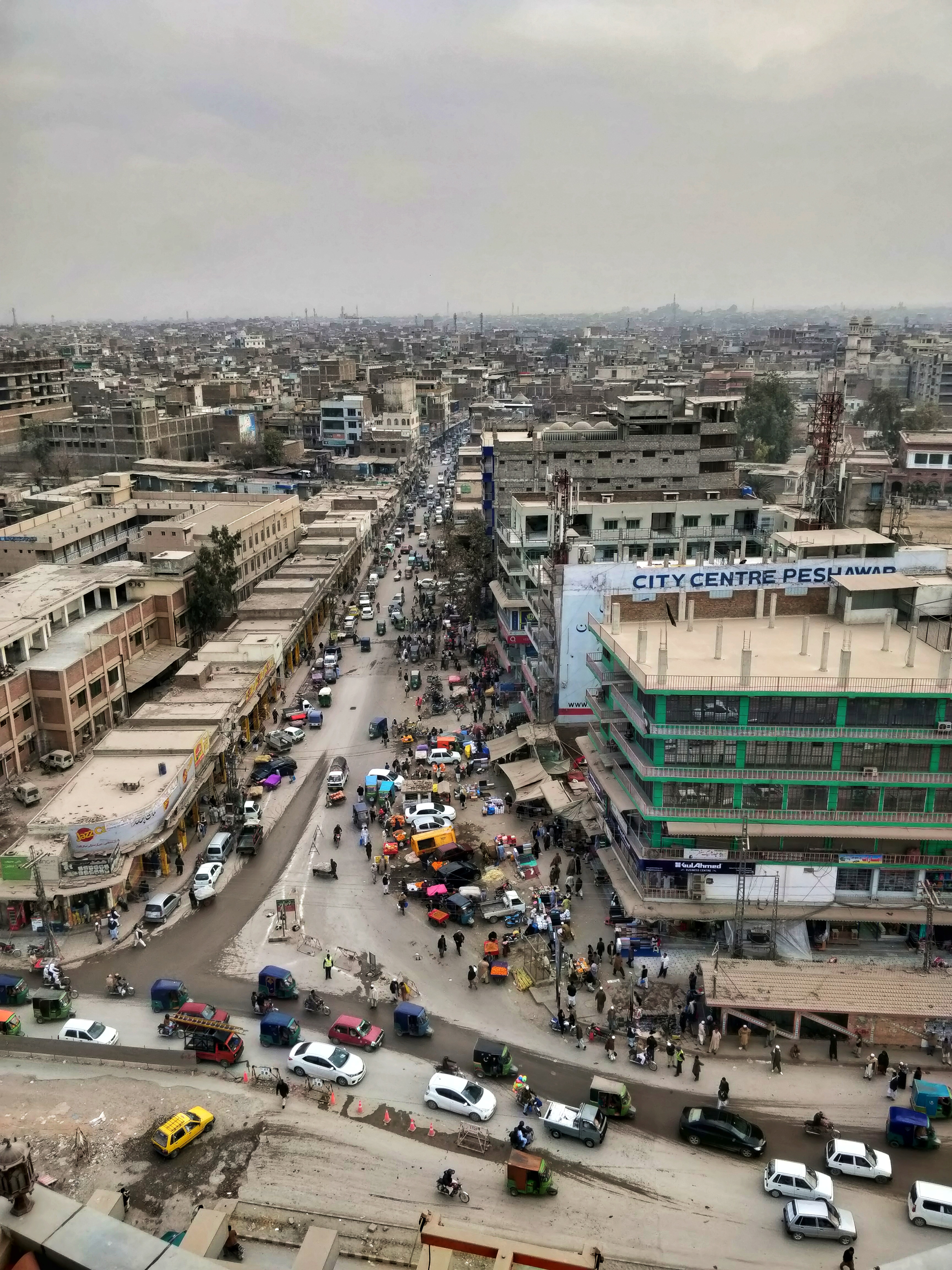
City Center Road is the major trade zone in Peshawar.

Peshawar's economic importance has historically been linked to its privileged position at the entrance to the Khyber Pass – the ancient travel route by which most trade between Central Asia and the Indian subcontinent passed. Peshawar's economy also benefited from tourism in the mid-20th century, as the city formed a crucial part of the Hippie trail.

Peshawar's estimated monthly per capita income was ₨55,246 in 2015, compared to ₨117,924 in Islamabad, and ₨66,359 in Karachi. Peshawar's surrounding region is also relatively poor − Khyber Pakhtunkhwa's cities on average have an urban per capita income that is 20% less than Pakistan's national average for urban residents.

Peshawar was noted by the World Bank in 2014 to be at the helm of a nationwide movement to create an ecosystem for entrepreneurship, freelance jobs, and technology. The city has been host to the World Bank assisted Digital Youth Summit — an annual event to connect the city and province's youths to opportunities in the digital economy. The 2017 event hosted 100 speakers including several international speakers, and approximately 3,000 delegates in attendance.

=== Industry ===
Peshawar's Industrial Estate on Jamrud Road is an industrial zone established in the 1960s on 868 acres. The industrial estate hosts furniture, marble industries, and food processing industries, though many of its plots remain underutilized. The Hayatabad Industrial Estate hosts 646 industrial units in Peshawar's western suburbs, though several of the units are no longer in use. As part of the China Pakistan Economic Corridor, 4 special economic zones are to be established in the province, with roads, electricity, gas, water, and security to be provided by the government. The nearby Hattar SEZ is envisioned to provide employment to 30,000 people, and is being developed at a cost of approximately $200 million with completion expected in 2017.

=== Employment ===
As a result of large numbers of displaced persons in the city, only 12% of Peshawar's residents were employed in the formalized economy in 2012. Approximately 41% of residents in 2012 were employed in personal services, while 55% of Afghan refugees in the city in 2012 were daily wage earners. By 2016, Pakistan had adopted a policy to repatriate Afghan refugees.

Wages for unskilled workers in Peshawar grew on average 9.1% per year between 2002 and 2008. Following the outbreak of widespread Islamist violence in 2007, wages rose only 1.5% between 2008 and 2014. Real wages dropped for some skilled craftsmen during the period between 2008 and 2014.

=== Constraints ===
Peshawar's economy has been negatively impacted by political instability since 1979 resulting from the War in Afghanistan and subsequent strain on Peshawar's infrastructure from the influx of refugees. The poor security environment resulting from Islamist violence also impacted the city's economy. With the launch of Operation Zarb-e-Azb in 2014, the country's security environment has drastically improved.

The metropolitan economy suffers from poor infrastructure. The city's economy has also been adversely impacted by shortages of electricity and natural gas. The $54 billion China Pakistan Economic Corridor will generate over 10,000 MW by 2018 – greater than the current electricity deficit of approximately 4,500 MW.

Poor transportation is estimated to cause a loss of 4–6% of the Pakistani GDP. Peshawar for decades has suffered from chaotic, mismanaged, and inadequate public transportation and the poor public transportation also has been detrimental to the city's economy. Therefore, the government has since a new rapid bus service called BRT Peshawar covering the entire Peshawar. BRT Peshawar is now believed to be one the most advanced BRT of Pakistan

== Transportation ==
=== Road ===
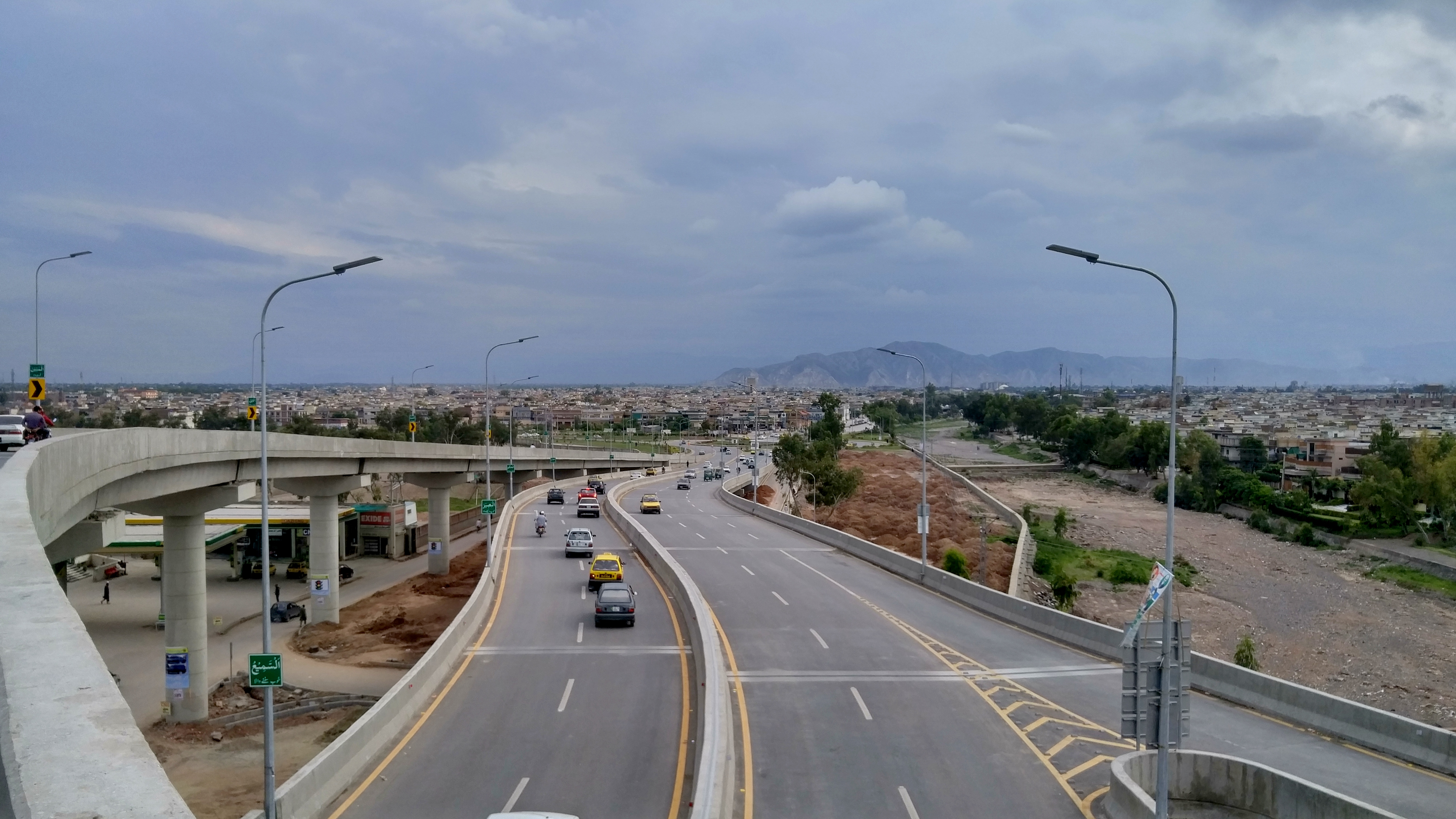
New flyovers, such as this one near the suburb of Hayatabad, have been constructed in recent years to improve traffic flow.

Peshawar's east–west growth axis is centred on the historic Grand Trunk Road that connects Peshawar to Islamabad and Lahore. The road is roughly paralleled by the M-1 Motorway between Peshawar and Islamabad, while the M-2 Motorway provides an alternate route to Lahore from Islamabad. The Grand Trunk Road also provides access to the Afghan border via the Khyber Pass, with onwards connections to Kabul and Central Asia via the Salang Pass.

Peshawar is to be completely encircled by the Peshawar Ring Road in order to divert traffic away from the city's congested centre. The road is currently under construction, with some portions open to traffic.

The Karakoram Highway provides access between the Peshawar region and western China, and an alternate route to Central Asia via Kashgar in the Chinese region of Xinjiang.

The Indus Highway provides access to points south of Peshawar, with a terminus in the southern port city of Karachi via Dera Ismail Khan and northern Sindh. The 1.9 km (1.2 mi) Kohat Tunnel south of Peshawar provides access to the city of Kohat along the Indus Highway.

==== Motorways ====
Peshawar is connected to Islamabad and Rawalpindi by the 155 kilometre long M-1 Motorway. The motorway also links Peshawar to major cities in the province, such as Charsadda and Mardan. The M-1 motorway continues onwards to Lahore as part of the M-2 motorway.

Pakistan's motorway network links Peshawar to Faisalabad by the M-4 Motorway, while a new motorway network to Karachi is being built as part of the China Pakistan Economic Corridor.

The Hazara Motorway, constructed as part of CPEC, is providing control-access motorway travel all the way to Mansehra and Thakot via the M-1 and Hazara Motorways.

=== Rail ===
Peshawar Cantonment railway station serves as the terminus for Pakistan's 1,687 km (1,048 mi)-long Main Line-1 railway that connects the city to the port city of Karachi and passes through the Peshawar City railway station. The Peshawar to Karachi route is served by the Awam Express, Khushhal Khan Khattak Express, and the Khyber Mail services.

The entire Main Line-1 railway track between Karachi and Peshawar is to be overhauled at a cost of $3.65 billion for the first phase of the project, with completion by 2021. Upgrading the railway line will permit train travel at speeds of 160 kilometres per hour, versus the average 60 to 105 km/h (37 to 65 mph) speed currently possible on existing tracks.

Peshawar was also once the terminus of the Khyber train safari, a tourist-oriented train that provided rail access to Landi Kotal. The service was discontinued as the security situation west of Peshawar deteriorated with the beginning of the region's Taliban insurgency.

=== Air ===
Peshawar is served by the Bacha Khan International Airport, located in the Peshawar Cantonment. The airport served 1,255,303 passengers between 2014 and 2015, the vast majority of whom were international travelers. The airport offers direct flights throughout Pakistan, as well as to Qatar, Saudi Arabia, and the United Arab Emirates.

=== Public transit ===
BRT Peshawar is a modern & third generation rapid bus service of Peshawar, which has started its service on 13 August 2020. It has 30 stations and 244 buses, which covers area from Chamkani to Karkhano Market. BRT Peshawar has replaced Peshawar's old, chaotic, dilapidated, and inadequate transportation system. The system has 30 stations and is mostly at grade, with four kilometres of elevated sections. The system also contains 3.5 kilometres of underpasses. BRT Peshawar is also complemented by a feeder system, with an additional 100 stations along those feeder lines.

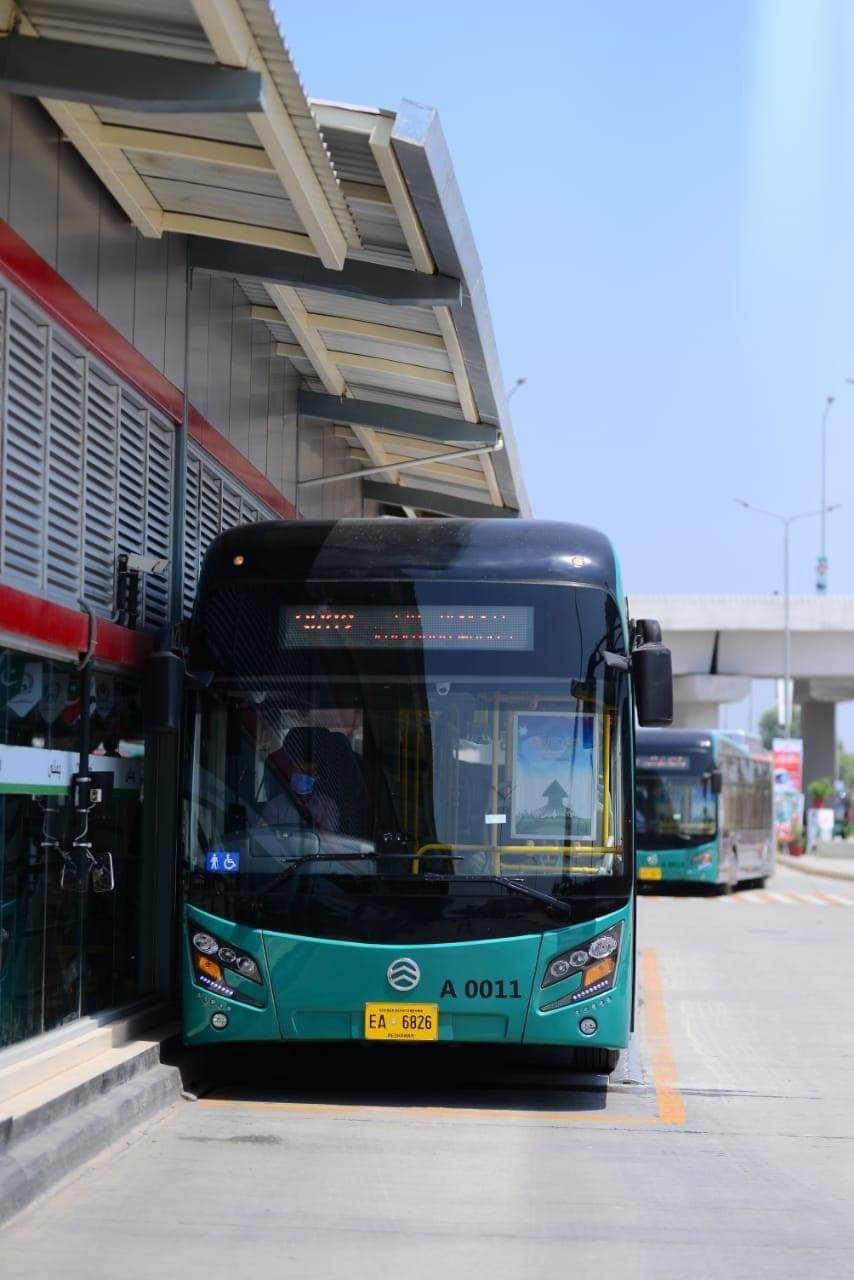
Peshawar has one of the most advanced Metro (BRT) systems.

=== Intercity bus ===
Peshawar is well-served by private buses (locally referred to as "flying coaches") and vans that offer frequent connections to throughout Khyber Pakhtunkhwa, as well as all major cities of Pakistan. The city's Daewoo Express bus terminal is located along the G.T. Road adjacent to the departure points for several other transportation companies.

== Administration ==
=== Politics ===
Peshawar has historically served as the political centre of the region, and is currently the capital city of Khyber Pakhtunkhwa province. The city and province have been historically regarded to be strongholds of the Awami National Party – a secular left-wing and moderate-nationalist party. The Pakistan Peoples Party had also enjoyed considerable support in the province due to its socialist agenda.

Despite being a centre for leftist politics in Khyber Pakhtunkhwa, Peshawar is still generally known throughout Pakistan for its social conservatism. Sunni Muslims in the city are regarded to be socially conservative, while the city's Shia population is considered to be more socially liberal.

A plurality of voters in Khyber Pakhtunkhwa province, of which Peshawar is the capital, elected one of Pakistan's only religiously based provincial governments during the period of military dictatorship of Pervez Musharraf. A ground-swell of anti-American sentiment after the 2001 United States invasion of Afghanistan contributed to the Islamist coalition's victory.

The Islamists introduced a range of social restrictions following the election of the Islamist Muttahida Majlis-e-Amal coalition in 2002, though Islamic Shariah law was never fully enacted. Restrictions on public musical performances were introduced, as well as a ban prohibiting music to be played in any public places, including on public transportation – which lead to the creation of a thriving underground music scene in Peshawar. In 2005, the coalition successfully passed the "Prohibition of Use of Women in Photograph Bill, 2005," leading to the removal of all public advertisements in Peshawar that featured women.

The religious coalition was swept out of power by the secular and leftist Awami National Party in elections after the fall of Musharraf in 2008, leading to the removal of the MMA's socially conservative laws. 62% of eligible voters voted in the election. The Awami National Party was targeted by Taliban militants, with hundreds of its members having been assassinated by the Pakistani Taliban.

In 2013, the centrist Pakistan Tehreek-e-Insaf was elected to power in the province on an anti-corruption platform. Peshawar city recorded a voter turnout of 80% for the 2013 elections.

=== Municipal services ===
86% of Peshawar's households have access to municipal piped water as of 2015, though 39% of Peshawar's households purchase water from private companies in 2015.

42% of Peshawar households are connected to municipal sewerage as of 2015.

== Culture ==
=== Music ===
After the 2002 Islamist government implemented restrictions on public musical performances, a thriving underground music scene took root in Peshawar. After the start of Pakistani Taliban insurgency in 2007–2008, militants began targeting members of Peshawar's cultural establishment. By 2007, Taliban militants began a widespread campaign of bombings against music and video shops across the Peshawar region, leading to the closure of many others. In 2009, Pashto musical artist Ayman Udas was assassinated by Taliban militants on the city's outskirts. In June 2012, a Pashto singer, Ghazala Javed, and her father were killed in Peshawar, after they had fled rural Khyber Pakhtunkhwa for the relative security of Peshawar.

Musicians began to return to the city by 2016, with a security environment greatly improved following the Operation Zarb-e-Azb in 2014 to eradicate militancy in the country. In 2016, the provincial government announced a monthly income of $300 to 500 musicians in order to help support their work, as well as a $5 million fund to "revive the rich cultural heritage of the province".

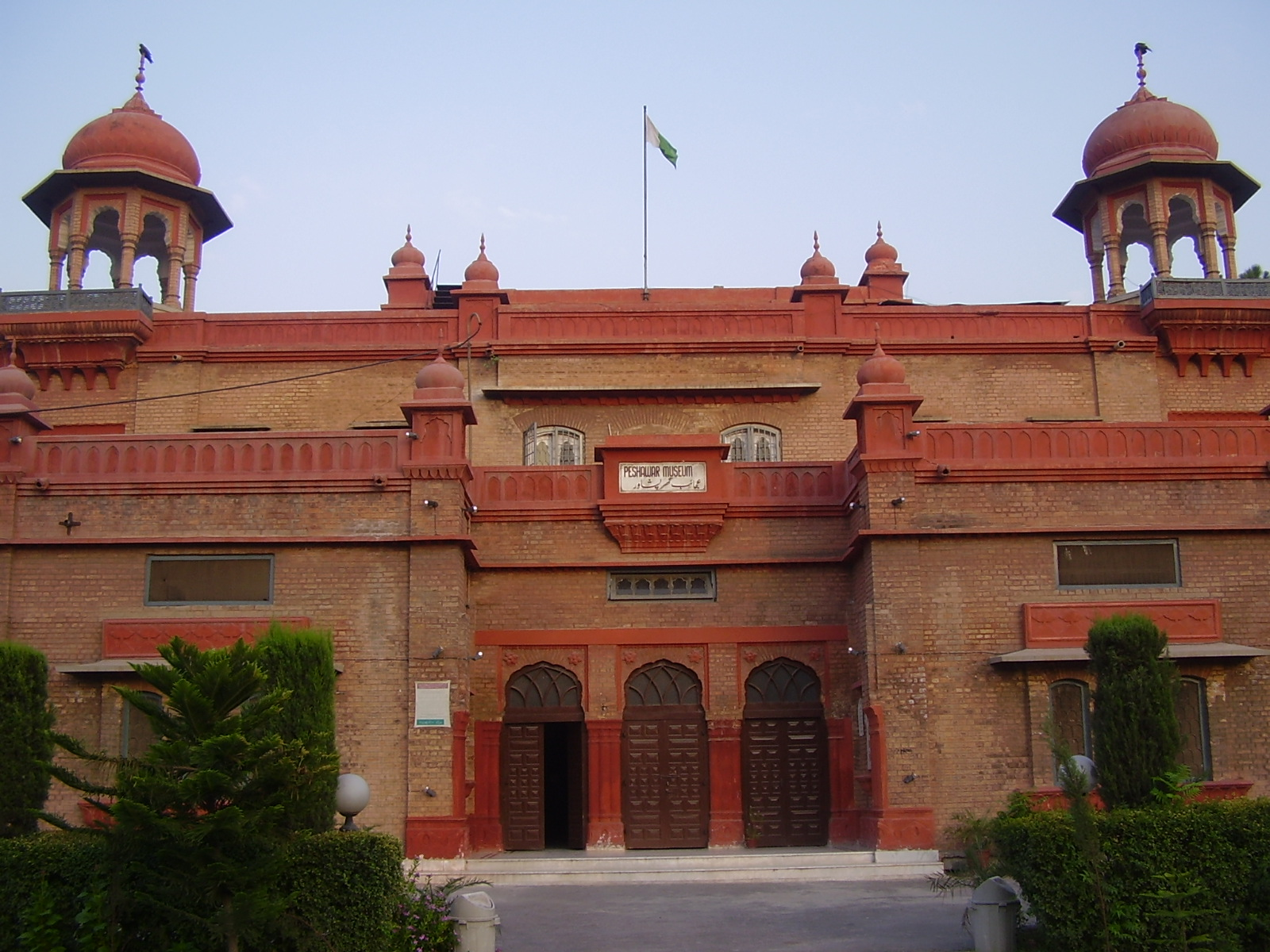
Peshawar Museum

=== Museums ===
The Peshawar Museum was founded in 1907 in memory of Queen Victoria. The building features an amalgamation of British, South Asian, Hindu, Buddhist and Mughal Islamic architectural styles. The museum's collection has almost 14,000 items, and is well known for its collection of Greco-Buddhist art. The museum's ancient collection features pieces from the Gandharan, Kushan, Parthian, and Indo-Scythian periods.

== Education ==
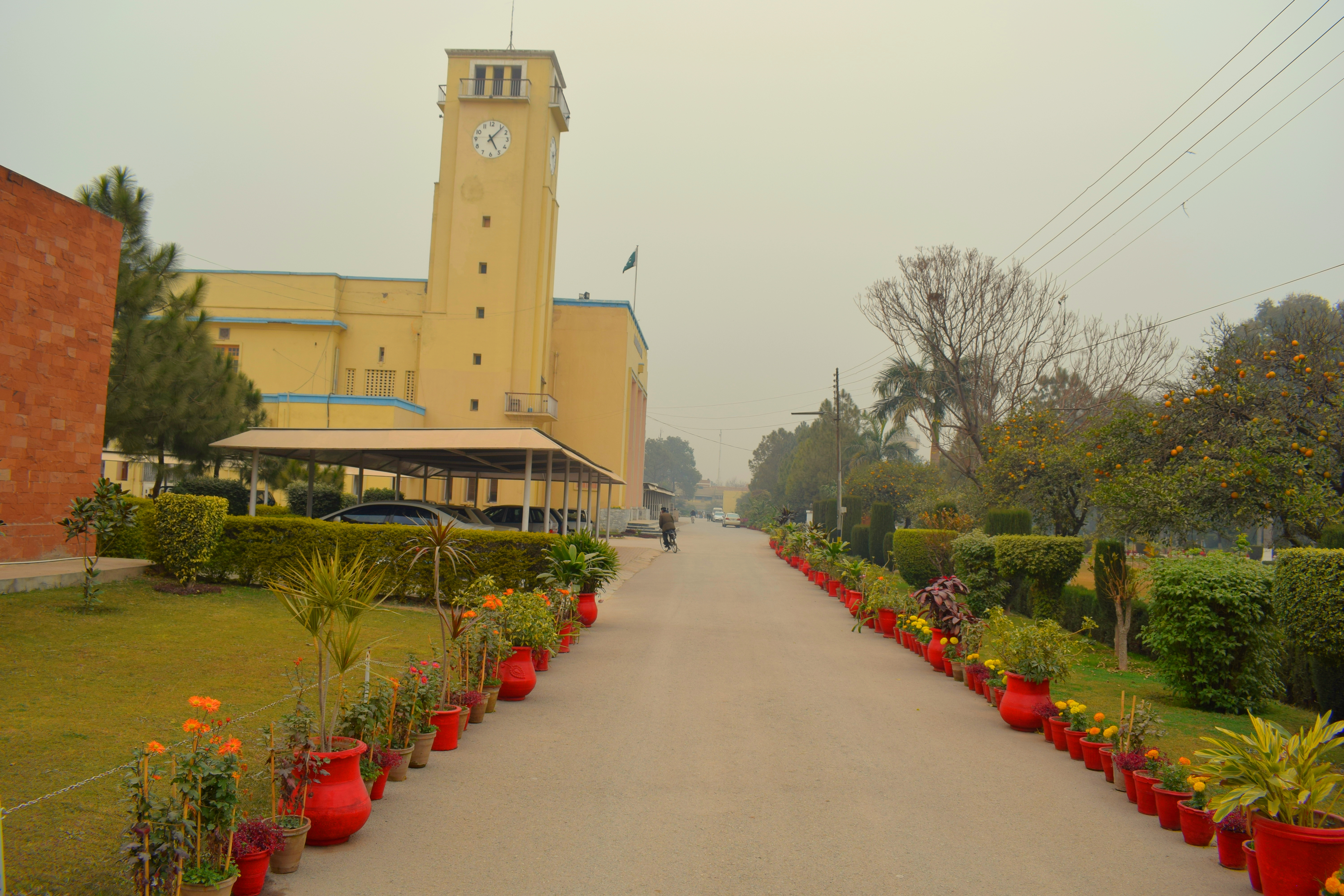
Museum of Peshawar University

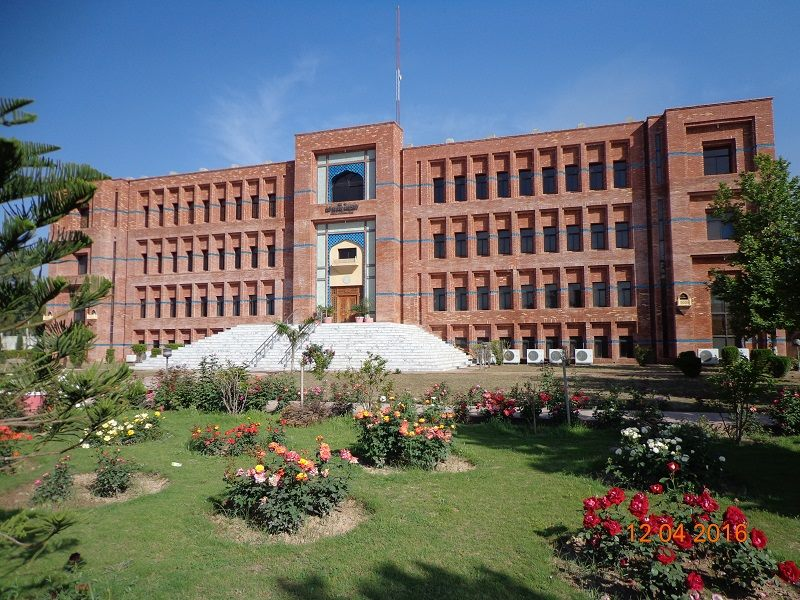
FAST Peshawar Campus

Numerous educational institutes — schools, colleges and universities — are located in Peshawar. 21.6% of children between the ages of 5 and 9 were not enrolled in any school in 2013, while 16.6% of children in the 10 to 14 age range were out of school.

Currently, Peshawar has universities for all major disciplines ranging from Humanities, General Sciences, Sciences, Engineering, Medical, Agriculture and Management Sciences. The first public sector university, University of Peshawar (UOP) was established in October 1950 by the first Prime Minister of Pakistan. University of Engineering and Technology, Peshawar was established in 1980 while Agriculture University Peshawar started working in 1981. The first private sector university CECOS University of IT and Emerging Sciences was established in 1986. Institute of Management Sciences started functioning in 1995, which become degree awarding institution in 2005.

There are currently 9 Medical colleges in Peshawar, 2 in public sector while 7 in private sector. The first Medical College, Khyber Medical College, was established in 1954 as part of University of Peshawar. The first Medical University, Khyber Medical University while a women only Medical college, Khyber Girls Medical College was established in 2007.

At the start of the 21st century, a host of new private sector universities started working in Peshawar. Qurtuba University, Sarhad University of Science and IT, Fast University, Peshawar Campus and City University of Science and IT were established in 2001 while Gandhara University was inaugurated in 2002 and Abasyn University in 2007.

Shaheed Benazir Bhutto Women University, the first women university of Peshawar, started working in 2009 while private sector IQRA National University was established in 2012.

Apart from good range of universities, Peshawar has host of high quality further education (Post School) educational institutes. The most renowned are, Edwardes College founded in 1900 by Herbert Edwardes, is the oldest college in the province and Islamia College Peshawar, which was established in 1913. Islamia College became university and named as Islamia College University in 2008.

The following is a list of some of the public and private universities and colleges in Peshawar:

- Abasyn University (Abasyn University, Peshawar)
- Agricultural University (Peshawar)
- CECOS University of IT and Emerging Sciences
- City University of Science and Information Technology, Peshawar
- Edwardes College
- Forward Degree College
- Frontier Women University
- Gandhara University
- Government College Peshawar
- Government Girls Degree College, Peshawar
- Government Superior Science College Peshawar
- IMSciences (Institute of Management Sciences)
- Iqra National University, Peshawar (formerly Peshawar Campus of Iqra University Karachi)
- Islamia College University
- Jinnah College for Women
- Jinnah Medical College
- Khyber Girls Medical College
- Khyber Medical College
- Khyber Medical University
- National University of Computer and Emerging Sciences, Peshawar Campus (NU-FAST)
- Pakistan Forest Institute, Peshawar
- Peshawar Medical College
- Kabir Medical College
- Sardar Begum Dental College
- Preston University
- Qurtuba University (Qurtuba University of Science & Information Technology)
- Rehman Medical College
- Sarhad University of Science and Information Technology
- Shaheed Benazir Bhutto Women University
- University of Agriculture, Peshawar
- University of Engineering and Technology, Peshawar
- University of Peshawar

The Pakistani military operates Army Public School Peshawar. It was the site of the 2014 Peshawar school massacre.

In recent years, Peshawar's educational landscape has seen a notable shift from traditional internal science expos to structural STEM and digital literacy initiatives targeting younger demographics. Higher education institutions like FAST-NUCES Peshawar campus have historically anchored regional technology events through initiatives like NUTEC, an inter-university STEM competition.

By the mid-2020s, this culture shifted toward younger demographics through localized school exhibitions and specialized school forums. Local innovation ecosystems, such as the National Incubation Center (NIC) Peshawar, have catalyzed this growth by incubating homegrown EdTech ventures like STEMverse who deployed robotics and AI training modules in regional schools. This collective momentum culminated in a series of competitive academic milestones in early 2026. In January 2026, the Bloomfield Hall Science Society, backed by the provincial Directorate of Science and Technology (DoST) KP, organized an inter-school and college Science Olympiad in Peshawar ar the Bloomfield Hall School Peshawar senior branch (the Bloomfield Hall Science Olympiad), that drew over 20 regional institutions. This private sector milestone was followed in March 2026 by a public sector expansion, when the KP Elementary and Secondary Education Department collaborated with the British Council's ILMpact initiative to host a multi-district provincial STEAM competition at the Government Girls Higher Secondary School Lady Griffith.

== Landmarks ==
The following is a list of other significant landmarks in the city that still exist in the 21st century:

- General
  - Governor's House
  - Peshawar Garrison Club – situated on Sir Syed Road near the Mall
  - Kotla Mohsin Khan – the residence of Mazullah Khan, 17th-century Pashtu poet
  - Qissa Khwani Bazaar
  - Kapoor Haveli Former residence of Prithviraj Kapoor – famous actor
- Forts
  - Bala Hisar Fort
- Colonial monuments
  - Chowk Yadgar (formerly the "Hastings Memorial")
  - Cunningham clock tower – built in 1900 and called "Ghanta Ghar"
- Buddhist
  - Gorkhatri – an ancient site of Buddha's alms or begging bowl, and the headquarters of Syed Ahmad Shaheed, Governor Avitabile
  - Pashto Academy – the site of an ancient Buddhist university
  - Shahji ki Dheri – the site of the famous Kanishka stupa
- Hindu
  - Panch Tirath – an ancient Hindu site with five sacred ponds
  - Gorkhatri – sacred site for Hindu yogis
  - Guru Gorkhnath temple
  - Aasamai temple – near Lady Reading Hospital (LRH)
- Sikh
  - Sikh Gurudwara at Jogan Shah
- Parks
  - Army Stadium
  - Wazir Bagh – laid in 1802, by Fatteh Khan, Prime Minister of Shah Mahmud Khan
  - Ali Mardan Khan Gardens (also known as Khalid bin Waleed Park) – formerly named "Company Bagh"
  - Shahi Bagh – a small portion constitutes the site of Arbab Niaz Stadium
  - Jinnah Park – A park on GT Road opposite Balahisar fort
  - Tatara Park – A Park located in Hayatabad
  - Bagh e Naran – A large park in Hayatabad. A portion of the park also has a Zoo.
- Mosques
  - Mohabbat Khan Mosque
  - Qasim Ali Khan Mosque
- Museums
  - Peshawar Museum
- Zoo
  - Peshawar Zoo

== Sports ==
There are hosts of sporting facilities in Peshawar. The most renowned are Arbab Niaz Stadium, and Hayatabad Cricket Stadium, which are the International cricket grounds of Peshawar and Qayyum Stadium, which is the multi sports facilities located in Peshawar Cantonment.

Cricket is the most popular sport in Peshawar with Arbab Niaz Stadium as the main ground coupled with Cricket Academy. There is also small cricket ground, Peshawar Gymkhana Ground, which is located adjacent to Arbab Niaz Stadium, a popular club cricket ground. The oldest international cricket ground in Peshawar however is Peshawar Club Ground, which hosted the first ever test match between Pakistan and India in 1955. The Peshawar Zalmi represents the city in the Pakistan Super League.

In 1975, the first sports complex, Qayyum Stadium was built in Peshawar while Hayatabad Sports Complex was built in the early 1990s. Both Qayyum Stadium and Hayatabad Sports Complexes are multiple sports complexes with facilities for all major indoor and outdoor sports such as football, Field Hockey ground, Squash, Swimming, Gymnasium, Board Games section, Wrestling, Boxing and Badminton. In 1991, Qayyum Stadium hosted Barcelona Olympics Qualifier Football match between Pakistan and Qatar plus it also hosted National Games in 2010. Hockey and squash are also popular in Peshawar.

Professional sports teams from Peshawar

Club	League	Sport	Venue	Established
Peshawar Zalmi	Pakistan Super League	Cricket	Arbab Niaz Stadium	2015
Peshawar Panthers	National T20 League/National One-day Championship	Cricket	Arbab Niaz Stadium	2004
Peshawar Haiders	Super Kabaddi League	Kabaddi	Tehmas Khan Stadium	2018
Tribe F.C. Peshawar	Super Football League	Football	Qayyum Stadium	2007

== Twin towns and sister cities ==
Peshawar is twinned with:

- Makassar, Indonesia
- Ürümqi, China

== See also ==
- Peshawari chappal
- Peshawari turban
- Karkhano
- Kushan Empire
- Kanishka
- Bacha Khan
- Khudai Khidmatgar
- 2014 Peshawar school attack
- 2020 Peshawar school bombing
- Chapli Kabab
