= Kotla Mohsin Khan =

Coordinates: 33.987°N 71.551°E

Kotla Mohsin Khan کوټلا محسن خان کوٹلا محسن خان
- Union Council
- Interactive map of Kotla Mohsin Khan کوټلا محسن خان کوٹلا محسن خان
- Country: Pakistan
- Province: Khyber Pakhtunkhwa
- City: Peshawar
- Tehsil: Peshawar I

Government
  - Type: Neighbourhood Council

Kotla Mohsin Khan (Pashto: کوټلا محسن خان, Hindko; Urdu: کوٹلا محسن خان) is a historic gate located on Kohat Road in Peshawar, Khyber Pakhtunkhwa Pakistan, and also serves as a neighbourhood.

== History ==
According to one legend, it was founded over a high mound in second half of 16th century by the noted Mughal Mansabdar Arbab Mustajab Khan Momand in the presence of two renowned spiritual figures—Hazrat Kaka Sahib Rahmkar and Akhund Dirwaiza Baba. Originally it was spread over 10 hectares of land.

It is a three-storey structure. The second floor consists of small rooms and a compound while its third floor contains security posts along with two rooms. Arbab Mustajab used to settle tribal disputes especially of Ghori Khel tribes living around Peshawar city while sitting in this fortified residence. Later, the residence was renamed after Arbab Mohsin Khan Momand, one of the Mustajab’s descendants.

Another legend says when Mughal King Aurangzeb Alamgir arrested Khushhal Khan Khattak, Arbab Mustajab Khan secured his release and kept him as guest in his Kotla on his own risk and later accompanied Khushhal Khan to Delhi.

When Sikhs occupied Peshawar in 1823, they set ablaze the historic Kotla gateway. But Abdul Karim Khan, another descendant of Mustajab, rebuilt it.

Arbab Haleem Khan, owner of the property housing Kotla gateway, told this scribe that last Mughal governor, Nawab Nasir Khan, welcomed the Iranian King Nadir Shah Afshar and gifted him the key to Peshawar in 1741 when he visited the city. This signaled the end of the Mughal Empire in Peshawar. Kotla Mohsin Khan also had been the abode of the popular classical Pashto Sufi poet, Mazaullah Khan Momand, who lived in the 17th century.
