= List of universities in Peshawar =

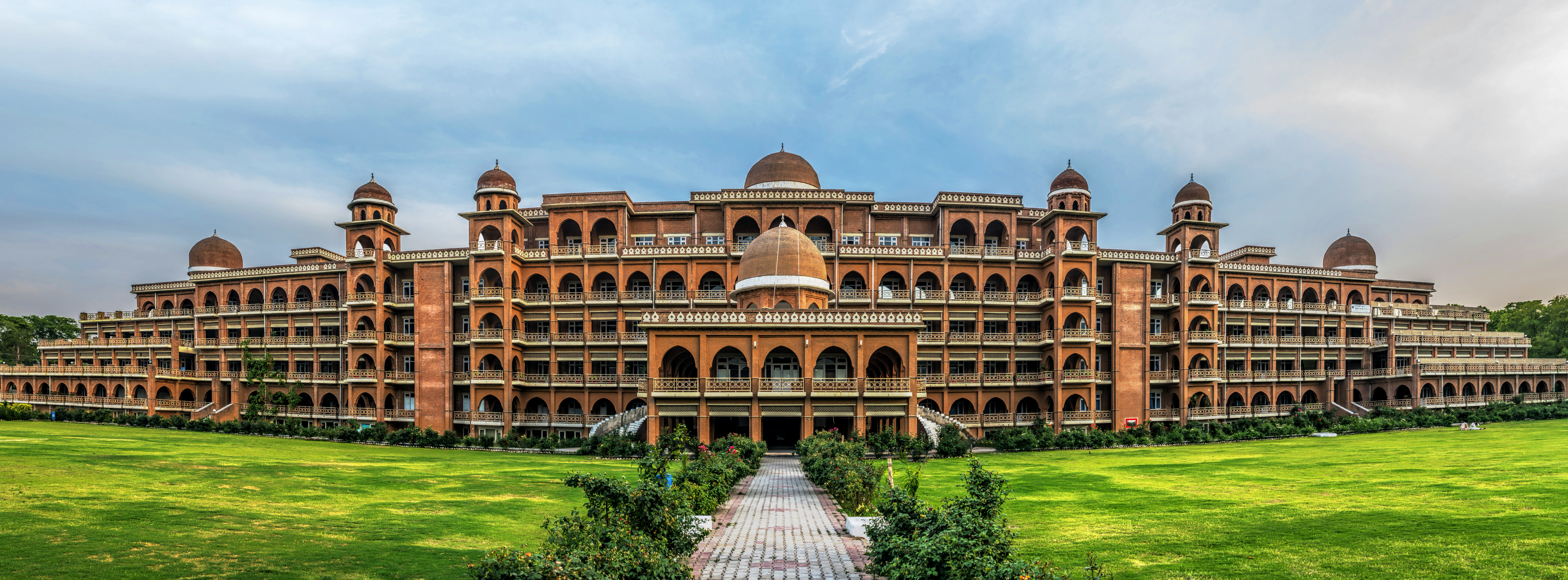
University of Peshawar

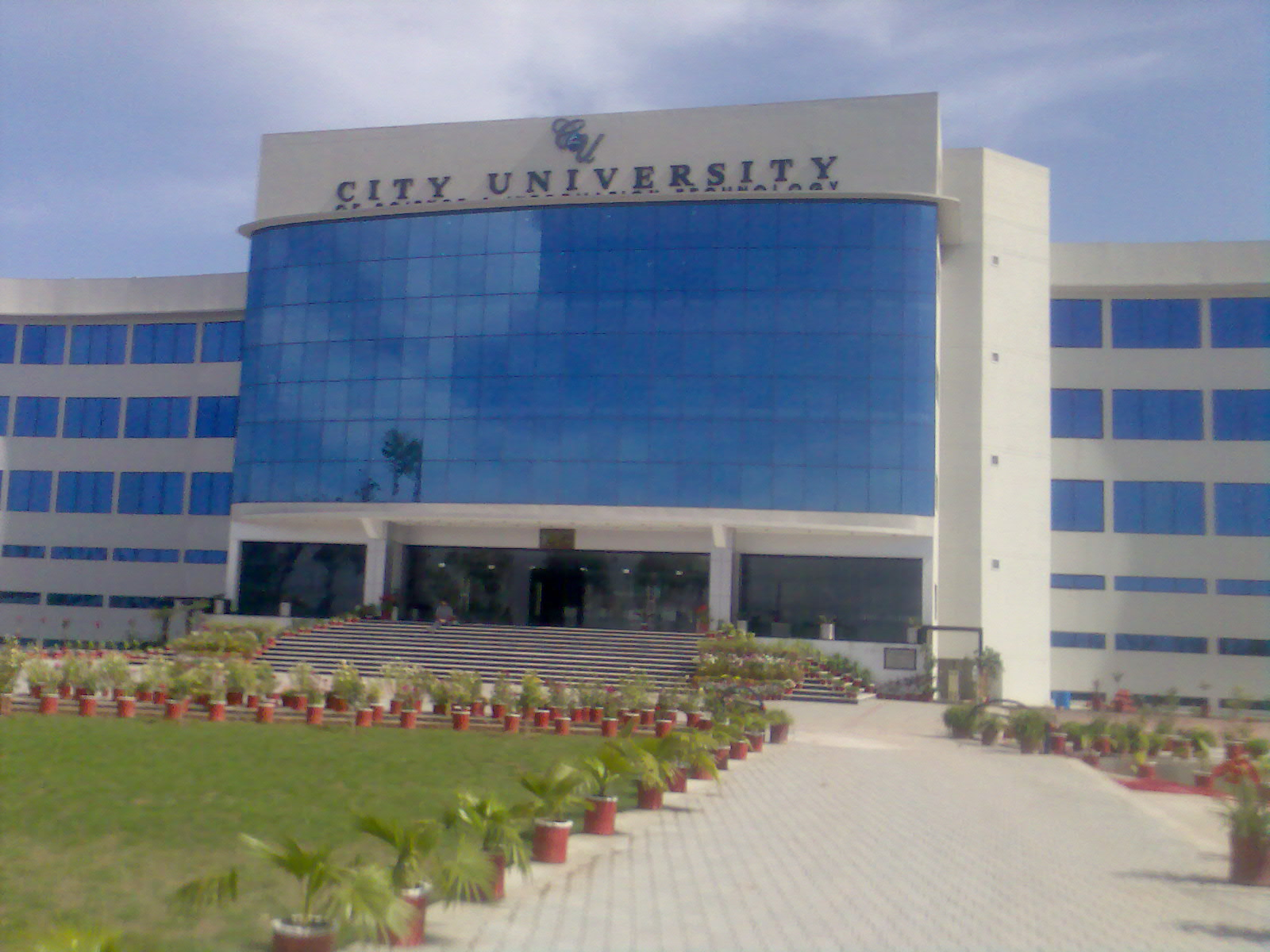
City University Peshawar

== Public sector ==
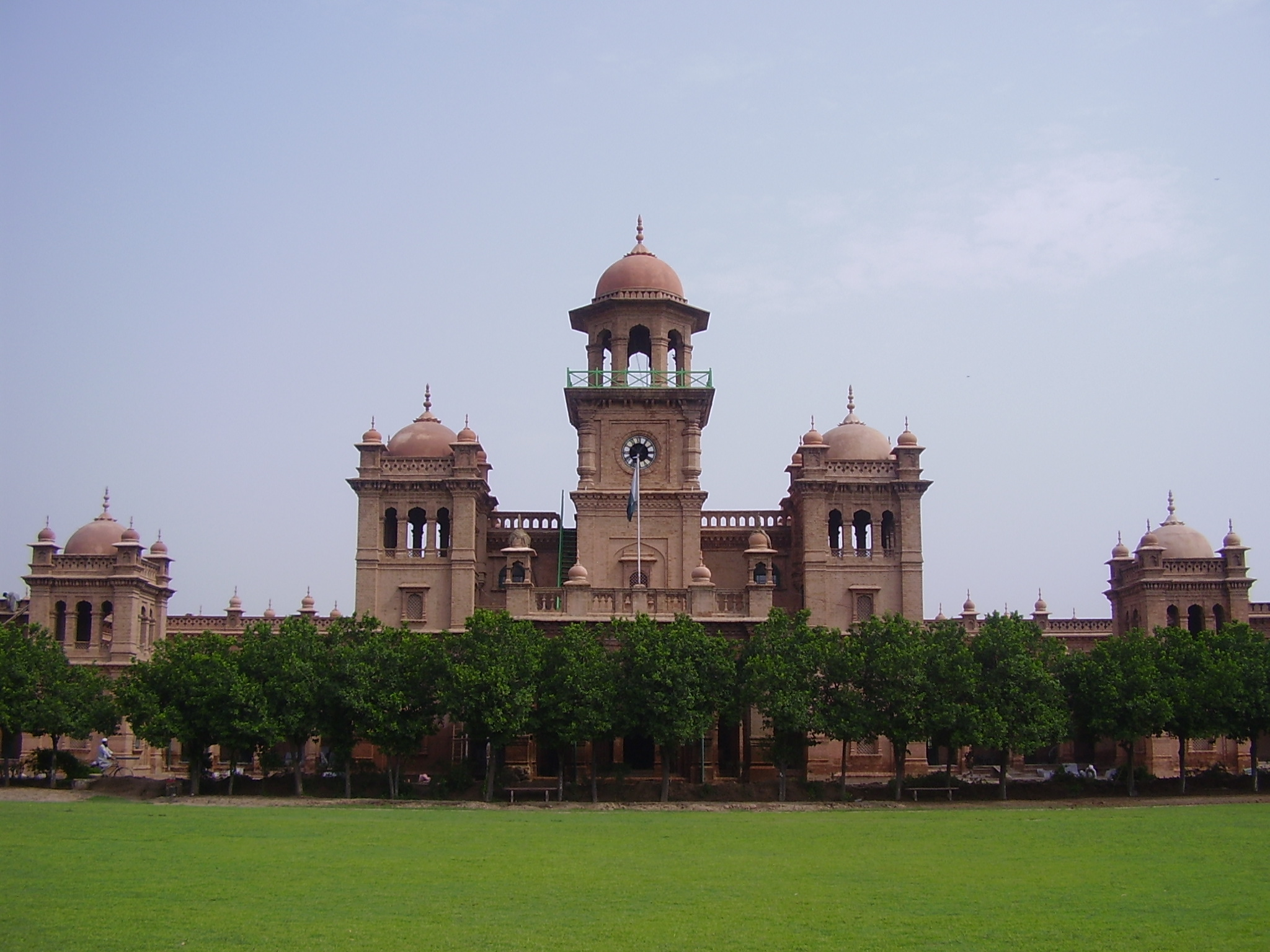
Islamia College University

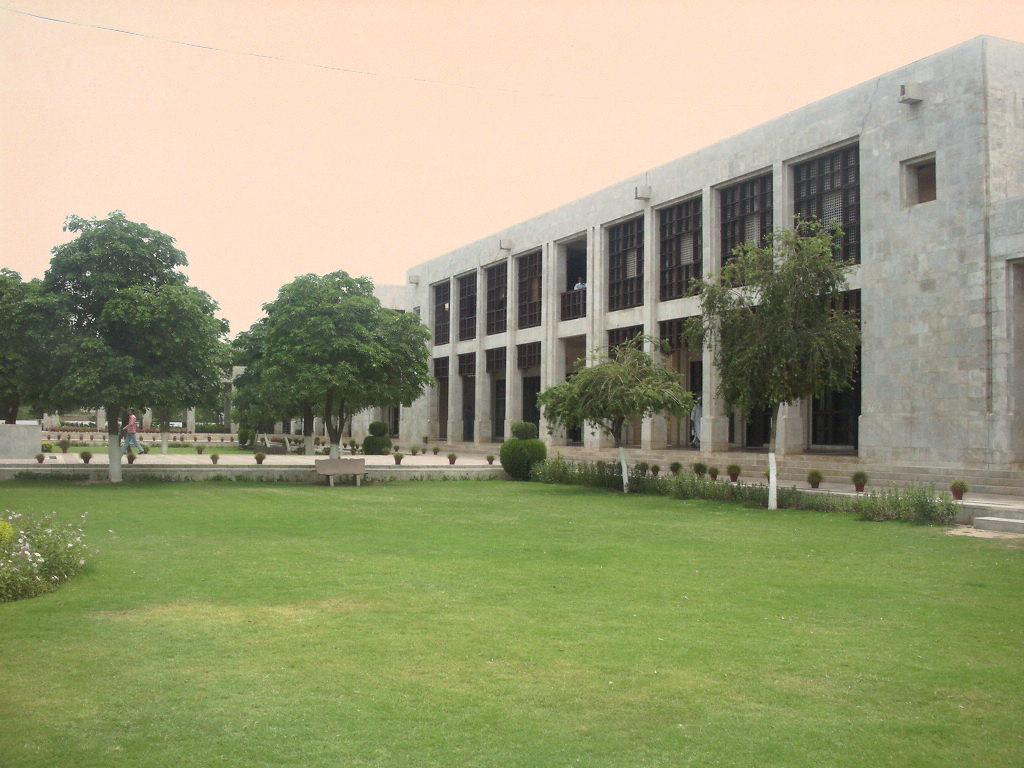
University of Agriculture

University	Islamabad	Established	Campuses	Specialization
Islamia College University	Peshawar	1913		General
University of Peshawar	Peshawar	1950		General
University of Engineering and Technology, Peshawar	Peshawar	1952	Abbottabad, Bannu, Jalozai, Kohat	Engineering and Technology
University of Agriculture, Peshawar	Peshawar	1981	Mardan	Agriculture, veterinary and business
Institute of Management Sciences	Peshawar	1995		Management Sciences
Khyber Medical University	Peshawar	2007	Abbottabad, Bannu, Mardan, DI Khan, Saidu Sharif (Swat)	Medical
Shaheed Benazir Bhutto Women University	Peshawar	2012		General

== Private sector ==
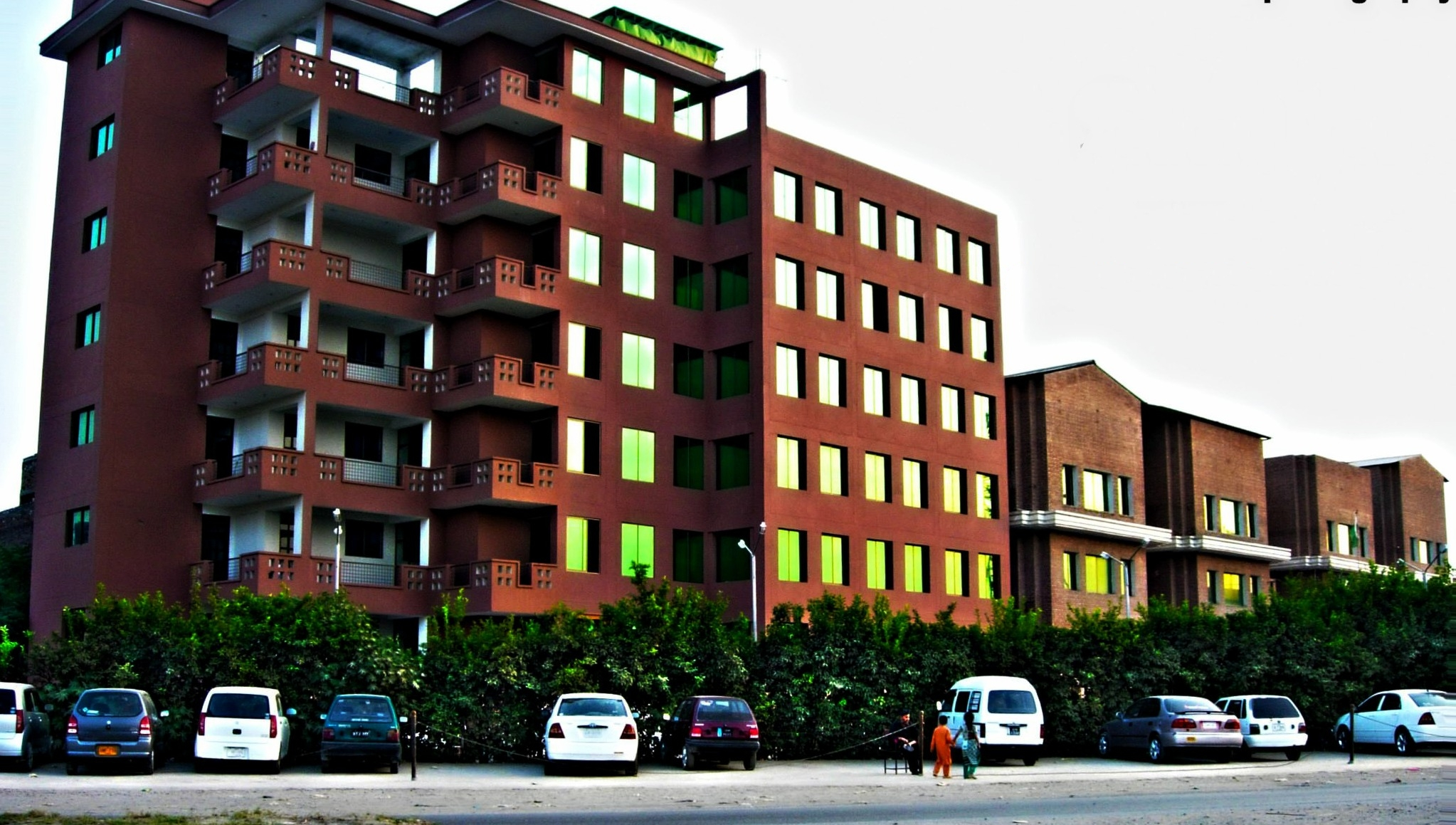
Abasyn University Peshawar

University	Location	Established	Campuses	Specialization
CECOS University of IT and Emerging Sciences	Peshawar	1986		IT & engineering
Brains Institute Pehsawar	Peshawar	1993	Peshawar	IT, Management& Engineering
IQRA National University	Peshawar	2000		General
Qurtuba University	Peshawar	2001	Dera Ismail Khan (DI Khan)	General
Sarhad University of Science and IT	Peshawar	2001		Science & IT
Fast University, Peshawar Campus	Peshawar	2001		Information technology
City University of Science and IT	Peshawar	2001		IT, engineering & general
Gandhara University	Peshawar	2002		Medical sciences
Abasyn University	Peshawar	2007		General
NUML, Peshawar Campus	Peshawar	2006	University Town Peshawar	General

== Post Graduate & Degree Colleges ==
List of Post Graduate & Degree Colleges is below.

=== Public Sector ===
- Edwardes College, Peshawar
- Islamia College Peshawar

=== Public Sector Boys Only ===
- Government College Peshawar
- Government Superior Science College, Peshawar
- Government Degree College Naguman Peshawar
- Government Degree College Mathra Peshawar
- Government Degree College Badaber Peshawar
- Government Degree College Wadpagga Peshawar
- Government Degree College Chagarmatti Peshawar
- Government Degree College Achyni Payan Peshawar

=== Private Sector ===
- Army Public School & Degree College
- Brains Post Graduate College & University
- Fazaia Degree College, Peshawar

=== Public Sector Girls Only ===
- Government Girls Degree College Dabgari Peshawar
- Government Degree college For women Gulshan Rehman Colony Peshawar
- Government Frontier College For Women Peshawar
- Government Girls Degree College Bacha Khan Kohat Road Peshawar
- Government Girls Degree College Chagarmatti Peshawar
- Government Girls Degree College Hayatabad Peshawar
- Government Girls Degree College Mathra Peshawar
- Government Girls Degree College Nahaqi Peshawar
- Government Girls Degree College No.2 Hayatabad Peshawar
- Government Girls Degree College Zaryab Colony Peshawar

== See also ==
- Peshawar District
- List of Universities in Pakistan
