= Government Girls Degree College, Peshawar =

Coordinates: 33°58′16.5″N 71°25′17.1″E

Government Girls Degree College Hayatabad Peshawar
- Address: Phase 7, Hayatabad, Peshawar, Pakistan
- Type: Public Sector
- Established: July 2006
- Location: Peshawar, Pakistan
- Website: Official Website

Government Girls Degree College is public sector college located on Hayatabad, Peshawar Khyber Pakhtunkhwa, Pakistan. The college offers programs for intermediate both in Arts and Science groups affiliate with Board of Intermediate And Secondary Education Peshawar plus BA & BSc programs which are affiliated with Shaheed Benazir Bhutto Women University.

== Overview & history ==
Government Girls Degree College Hayatabad Peshawar is established in 2006 in phase 7 adjacent to new Haji Camp in Hayatabad, Peshawar. The college offers courses in Natural Sciences, Social Sciences and Humanities. The college is well connected through network of roads to different phases of Hayatabad and other adjacent areas. Currently the college is catering the needs of around 1000 students at intermediate and degree levels.

The college has started in July 2006 with 70 students in FA/FSc and BA/BSc with subjects such as Psychology, Sociology, Mathematics, Economics, Civics/Political Science, Law etc. The classes in English literature at intermediate level is started in 2011.

== Faculties and departments ==
The college currently has the following faculties and departments.

=== Faculty of Social Sciences ===
- Department of Economics
- Department of English
- Department of Pak Studies
- Department of Geography
- Department of Health and physical Education
- Department of History
- Department of Home Economics
- Department of Islamyate
- Department of Law
- Department of Political Science
- Department of Psychology
- Department of Sociology
- Department of Urdu

=== Faculty of Physical Sciences ===
- Department of Chemistry
- Department of Computer Science
- Department of Mathematics
- Department of Physics
- Department of Statistics

=== Faculty of Biological Sciences ===
- Department of Botany
- Department of Zoology

== See also ==
- Edwardes College Peshawar
- Islamia College Peshawar
- Government Girls Degree College Mathra Peshawar
