= Government Degree College Mathra Peshawar =

- Address: Warsak Road, Mathra, Peshawar, Pakistan
- Type: Public Sector
- Established: May 2001
- Location: Peshawar, Pakistan
- Website: Official Website

Government Degree College Mathra Peshawar is public sector college located on Warsak Road, Mathra, Peshawar Khyber Pakhtunkhwa, Pakistan. The college offers programs for intermediate both in Arts and Science groups affiliate with Board of Intermediate And Secondary Education Peshawar plus BA & BSc programs which are affiliated with University of Peshawar.

== Overview & History ==
Government Degree College Mathra Peshawar was established in May 2001 in Mathra village on the outskirts of Peshawar city. The college is initially started in old elementary college building at Mathra.

== Programs ==
The college currently offers the following programs.

- FSc – Pre-Medical (2 years)
- FSc – Pre-Engineering (2 years)
- FSc – Computer Science (2 years)
- FA – General Science (2 years)
- FA – Humanities (2 years)

== Faculties And Departments ==
The college currently has the following faculties and departments.

- Department of Arabic
- Department of Botany
- Department of Chemistry
- Department of Computer Sciences
- Department of Economics
- Department of English
- Department of Health & Physical Education
- Department of History
- Department of Islamiyat
- Department of Law
- Department of Library Science
- Department of Mathematics
- Department of Pakistan Studies
- Department of Pashto
- Department of Physics
- Department of Political Science
- Department of Statistics
- Department of Urdu
- Department of Zoology

== See also ==
- Edwardes College Peshawar
- Islamia College Peshawar
- Government College Peshawar
- Government Superior Science College Peshawar
- Government Degree College Naguman Peshawar
- Government Degree College Mathra Peshawar
- Government Degree College Badaber Peshawar
- Government Degree College Chagarmatti Peshawar
- Government Degree College Wadpagga Peshawar
- Government Degree College Achyni Payan Peshawar
