= Government Degree College Badaber Peshawar =

- Address: Badaber, Peshawar, Pakistan
- Type: Public Sector
- Established: 1987
- Location: Peshawar, Pakistan
- Website: Official Website

Government Degree College Badaber (Badhber) Peshawar is a public sector degree college located in Badaber village of Peshawar, in Khyber Pakhtunkhwa, Pakistan.

== Overview & History ==
Government Degree College Badaber (Badhber) Peshawar was established in 1987 at Badaber near Masho Gagar around 13 km south of Peshawar. The college started initially as Intermediate level college but was updated to Degree college in 1998. The college offers courses at Intermediate level in both Science & Arts group and affiliated with Board of Intermediate & Secondary Education Peshawar. The college also offers BA and BSc course in Biological Sciences, Physical Sciences and Social Sciences/Humanities and affiliated with University of Peshawar.

== Departments And Faculties ==
The college currently has the following departments and faculties.

Social Sciences/Humanities

- Department of Civics
- Department of Pakistan Studies
- Department of English
- Department of Economics
- Department of Geography
- Department of Health & Physical Education
- Department of History
- Department of Islamiyat
- Department of Law
- Department of Urdu
- Department of Political Science
- Department of Library Science
- Department of Pashto

Physical Sciences

- Department of Chemistry
- Department of Computer Science
- Department of Mathematics
- Department of Physics
- Department of Statistics

Biological Sciences

- Department of Biology

== See also ==
- Edwardes College Peshawar
- Islamia College Peshawar
- Government College Peshawar
- Government Superior Science College Peshawar
- Government Degree College Naguman Peshawar
- Government Degree College Mathra Peshawar
- Government Degree College Badaber Peshawar
- Government Degree College Chagarmatti Peshawar
- Government Degree College Wadpagga Peshawar
- Government Degree College Achyni Payan Peshawar
