= Government Degree College Wadpagga Peshawar =

Coordinates: 34°02′44.9″N 71°38′25.8″E

- Address: Dalazak Road Wadpagga, Peshawar, Pakistan
- Type: Public Sector
- Location: Peshawar, Pakistan
- Website: Official Website

Government Degree College Wadpagga Peshawar is a public sector college located in Wadpagga, Peshawar Khyber Pakhtunkhwa, Pakistan. The college, which offers programs for intermediate level, is affiliated with the Board of Intermediate and Secondary Education Peshawar. For its degree programs, it is affiliated with University of Peshawar.

== Overview & History ==
Government Degree College Wadpagga Peshawar is located on Dalazak Road at Wadpagga in the outskirts of Peshawar city. The college was built by the efforts of prominent local politician & social worker Arbab Muhammad Ayub Jan adjacent to Government Higher Secondary School.

== Faculties And Departments ==
The college currently have the following faculties and departments.

- Department of Botany
- Department of Chemistry
- Department of Computer Science
- Department of Economics
- Department of English
- Department of Geography
- Department of History
- Department of Islamiyat
- Department of Law
- Department of Mathematics
- Department of Pakistan Studies
- Department of Pashto
- Department of Physics
- Department of Political Science
- Department of Statistics
- Department of Urdu
- Department of Zoology

== See also ==
- Edwardes College Peshawar
- Islamia College Peshawar
- Government College Peshawar
- Government Superior Science College Peshawar
- Government Degree College Naguman Peshawar
- Government Degree College Mathra Peshawar
- Government Degree College Badaber Peshawar
- Government Degree College Chagarmatti Peshawar
- Government Degree College Wadpagga Peshawar
- Government Degree College Achyni Payan Peshawar
