= Government College Peshawar =

College in Pakistan

Coordinates: 34°1′11.2″N 71°34′40.4″E

- کالج دولتی پشاور
- Address: Faqirabad, Near Arbab Niaz Stadium, Peshawar, Pakistan
- Type: Public Sector
- Established: 1959
- Location: Peshawar, Pakistan
- Website: Official Website

Government College Peshawar is a public sector college located Faqirabad, Peshawar Khyber Pakhtunkhwa, Pakistan. The college offers programs for intermediate level both in Arts and Science groups, which are affiliated with Board of Intermediate and Secondary Education Peshawar. The college also offers 2 years BA & BSc programs plus 4 years BS programs in various disciplines, which are affiliated with University of Peshawar.

== Overview and history ==
Government College Peshawar is one of the colleges in Peshawar city. The college was established in June 1959. The college was relocated to its present location in 1961 prior to that it was functioning in the Provincial Assembly building for 4 years. The college building spreads over an area of around 40 Kanals and is located next to historic Shahi Bagh.

== Departments and faculties ==
The college currently has the following departments and faculties.

=== Faculty of Humanities ===
The main departments of humanities faculty are Arabic & Islamiyat, Economics, English, Health & Physical Education, History, Law, Library Science, Pakistan Studies, Pashto, Political Science and Urdu.

=== Faculty of Biological Sciences ===
There are currently three departments in Biological Sciences faculty: Geography, Botany and Zoology.

=== Faculty of Physical Sciences ===
The main departments of physical sciences faculty are Chemistry, Computer Science, Maths, Physics and Statistics.

== Academic programs ==
The college currently offers the following programs.

=== Intermediate ===
Currently the college has 2 years intermediate programs in FSc: Pre-Medical, Pre-Engineering and Computer Science while FA in General Science and Humanities.

=== Degree Level (2 years) ===
The college currently offers 2 years Degree level programs in BA (Humanities) and BSc (General Sciences and Computer Sciences).

=== BS Degrees (4 years) ===
The college currently offers 4 years BS programs in Computer Science, Economics, Physics, Chemistry, Botany, Zoology, Mathematics, Urdu, Geography, English, Statistics, Islamiyat.

== Sporting activities ==
Government College Peshawar is actively participating in sports activities besides education. The college cricket team won the 2016 BISE, Peshawar cricket tournament played between 24 teams of schools and colleges affiliated with BISE, Peshawar. In 2017, KP Inter-Divisional games were held in the college in which around 200 players from Peshawar, Mardan, Kohat, Malakand, Bannu, Dera Ismail Khan and Hazara divisions participated in the sports gala.

== See also ==
- Edwardes College Peshawar
- Islamia College Peshawar
- Government College Peshawar
- Government Superior Science College Peshawar
- Government Degree College Naguman Peshawar
- Government Degree College Mathra Peshawar
- Government Degree College Badaber Peshawar
- Government Degree College Chagarmatti Peshawar
- Government Degree College Wadpagga Peshawar
- Government Degree College Achyni Payan Peshawar
