= Government Girls Degree College Mathra Peshawar =

- Address: Khazana Road, Mathra, Peshawar, Pakistan
- Type: Public Sector
- Established: September 2011
- Location: Peshawar, Pakistan
- Website: Official Website

Government Girls Degree College Mathra Peshawar is public sector college located in Mathra, Peshawar Khyber Pakhtunkhwa, Pakistan. The college offers programs for intermediate level and is affiliated with Board of Intermediate And Secondary Education Peshawar. The college also offers BA & BSc degree programs which are affiliated with University of Peshawar.

== Overview & History ==
Government Girls Degree College Mathra Peshawar started working from September 2011. The campus of college is sprawling over an area of 34.54 Kanals. The campus has academic and administration block, student hostel, classrooms, science laboratories and a library with books. The college also provides transport facility for its students.

== Faculties And Departments ==
The college currently has the following faculties and departments.

- Department of Botany
- Department of Chemistry
- Department of Computer Science
- Department of Economics
- Department of English
- Department of Geography
- Department of History
- Department of Home Economics
- Department of Islamiyat
- Department of Law
- Department of Library Sciences
- Department of Mathematics
- Department of Pakistan Studies
- Department of Physics
- Department of Political Science
- Department of Psychology
- Department of Pushto
- Department of Statistics
- Department of Urdu
- Department of Zoology

== See also ==
- Edwardes College Peshawar
- Islamia College Peshawar
- Government Girls Degree College Hayatabad Peshawar
