= Naguman =

- Village
- Location in Pakistan Naguman (Pakistan)
- Coordinates: 34.1242°N 71.6087°E
- Country: Pakistan
- Province: Khyber-Pakhtunkhwa
- District: Peshawar District

Naguman is a village at the northern end of Peshawar District in Khyber Pakhtunkhwa of Pakistan, It is located on the outskirts of Peshawar city on the main Charsadda Road.

== Overview ==
It is home to Ultra Light Flying Sports Club and Government Degree College Naguman.

== Educational Institutes ==
- Government Degree College Naguman Peshawar

== See also ==
- Peshawar
- Peshawar District
- Mathra
