= Government Degree College Achyni Payan Peshawar =

Govt Degree College Achini Payan, Peshawar is a public sector degree college situated on Ring Road near Sarhad University Peshawar in Landi Akhun Ahmad village. Although named as Govt Degree College Achini Payan, Peshawar, the college is actually located about 6 km away from Achini Payan eastwards on Ring Road near Pishtakhara Chowk.

Academic activities started for the first time in September 2017. Students of all disciplines are admitted to 1st year of FA/FSc & AD/ADS.

== Overview and history ==
The foundation stone for Government Degree College Achyni Payan Peshawar was laid in 2012–13. It is situated in Achini Payan on Peshawar Ring Road near Landi Akhun Ahmad. The campus of the college is spread over 23 kanals of land and the current college building was constructed in 2015. The campus currently has a double-story building containing an academic block, administration block, examination hall, modern laboratories, library, and cafeteria.

== Departments and faculties ==
The college currently has the following departments and faculties.

- Department of Pashto (Chaired By: Prof. Riaz Ahmad)
- Department of Political Science (Prof. Muhammad Israr Khan)
- Department of Chemistry (Chaired by Prof. Mujeeb Ur Rehman)
- Department of English
- Department of Health & Physical Education
- Department of Islamiyat
- Department of Library Science
- Department of Mathematics
- Department of Physics
- Department of Statistics
- Department of Urdu (Chaired by Prof. Fazal-e-Maula)
- Department of Zoology (Chaired by Prof. Ayaz Ahmad)

== See also ==
- Edwardes College Peshawar
- Islamia College Peshawar
- Government College Peshawar
- Government Superior Science College Peshawar
- Government Degree College Naguman Peshawar
- Government Degree College Mathra Peshawar
- Government Degree College Badaber Peshawar
- Government Degree College Chagarmatti Peshawar
- Government Degree College Wadpagga Peshawar
- Government Degree College Achyni Payan Peshawar
