= Patwar Bala =

Coordinates: 34°04′N 71°28′E

Patwar Bala is a small village of union council Mathra, Peshawar District, Pakistan. It belongs to the Khalil tribe sub branch "Tapa Barozai."

== Demographics ==
According to the 2017 census, the village population was 3,911.
