= Government Superior Science College Peshawar =

Public sector college in Peshawar, Pakistan

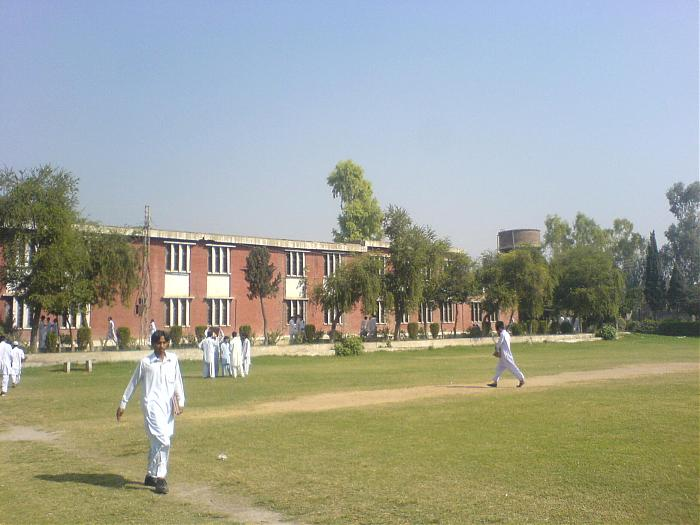
- Government Superior Science College
- Address: Daura Road, Near Wazir Bagh, Peshawar, Pakistan
- Type: Public Sector
- Established: 1962
- Principal: Mujahid Suri
- Location: Peshawar, Pakistan
- Website: Official Website

Government Superior Science College Peshawar is a public sector college located in Wazir Bagh, Peshawar, Khyber Pakhtunkhwa, Pakistan. The college offers programs for intermediate and degree levels in Science and Arts groups. The college is affiliated for its degree programs with University of Peshawar.

== Overview & history ==
Government Superior Science College (GSSC) Peshawar is one of the most popular public sector colleges operating within the Peshawar metropolis along with Government College Peshawar and Government College Hayatabad, Peshawar. It was established in 1962 and provides educational services along with training in sports and other social skills. The college shifted to its current campus in 1972 next to the famous and historic Wazir Bagh. The college is well connected through the roads with the surrounding areas and other parts of Peshawar city.

== Vision ==
The vision of college is to broaden the horizons of knowledge and enable students to reach the zenith of intellectual achievement and personal growth to the ultimate benefit of human society and beyond.

== Academic programs ==
The college currently offers the following programs.

=== Intermediate ===
- FSc – Pre-Medical (2 years)
- FSc – Pre-Engineering (2 years)
- FSc – Computer Science (2 years)
- FA – General Science (2 years)
- FA – Humanities (2 years)

=== Degrees (2 Years) ===
- BA - Humanities (2 years)
- BSc - General and Computer Sciences (2 years)

=== BS Degrees (4 Years) ===
- BS - 4 Years programme (14 Discipline)

== Departments And Faculties ==
The college currently has the following departments and faculties.

=== Faculty of Social Sciences/Humanities ===
- Department of Archaeology
- Department of Economics
- Department of English
- Department of Geography
- Department of History
- Department of Islamic Studies
- Department of Law
- Department of Library Science
- Department of Pakistan Study
- Department of Pashto
- Department of Physical Education
- Department of Political Science
- Department of Urdu

=== Faculty of Physical Sciences ===
- Department of Chemistry
- Department of Computer Science
- Department of Mathematics
- Department of Physics
- Department of Statistics

=== Faculty of Biological Sciences ===
- Department of Botany
- Department of Zoology

== See also ==
- Edwardes College Peshawar
- Islamia College Peshawar
- Government College Peshawar
- Government Superior Science College Peshawar
- Government Degree College Naguman Peshawar
- Government Degree College Mathra Peshawar
- Government Degree College Badaber Peshawar
- Government Degree College Chagarmatti Peshawar
- Government Degree College Wadpagga Peshawar
- Government Degree College Achyni Payan Peshawar
