= Government Degree College Naguman Peshawar =

Coordinates: 34°07′22.2″N 71°36′1.3″E

- کالج دولتی درجه ناگومان پشاور
- Address: Charsadda Road, Naguman, Peshawar, Pakistan
- Type: Public Sector
- Established: 2012-2013
- Location: Peshawar, Pakistan
- Website: Official Website

Government Degree College Naguman is a public sector degree college located in Naguman, Peshawar, in Pakistan's Khyber Pakhtunkhwa province. The college is affiliated with University of Peshawar for its degree program.

== Overview & History ==
Government degree college Naguman Peshawar was established by KP Provincial Government during 2012-2013. It is situated in the village of Naguman on the outskirts of Peshawar city. The campus of the college is spread over 40 Kanals of land. The campus currently houses an Administrative Block, Academic Block, Food Court, Auditorium, Playgrounds, Central Library, Laboratories, Computer Labs, Staff Hostel and Parking Facilities.

== Departments And Faculties ==
The college currently has the following departments and faculties.

=== Social Sciences/Humanities ===
- Department of Pakistan Studies
- Department of English
- Department of Economics
- Department of Geography
- Department of Health & Physical Education
- Department of History
- Department of Arabic And Islamiyat
- Department of Law
- Department of Urdu
- Department of Political Science
- Department of Pashto

=== Physical Sciences ===
- Department of Chemistry
- Department of Computer Science
- Department of Mathematics
- Department of Physics
- Department of Statistics

=== Biological Sciences ===
- Department of Botany
- Department of Zoology

== See also ==
- Edwardes College Peshawar
- Islamia College Peshawar
- Government College Peshawar
- Government Superior Science College Peshawar
- Government Degree College Naguman Peshawar
- Government Degree College Mathra Peshawar
- Government Degree College Badaber Peshawar
- Government Degree College Chagarmatti Peshawar
- Government Degree College Wadpagga Peshawar
- Government Degree College Achyni Payan Peshawar
