= Government Degree College Chagarmatti Peshawar =

- کالج دولتی درجه چگرمتی پشاور
- Address: Chagarmatti, Peshawar, Pakistan
- Type: Public Sector
- Location: Peshawar, Pakistan
- Website: Official Website

Government Degree College Chagarmatti Peshawar is a public sector degree college located in Chagarmatti village of Peshawar, in Khyber Pakhtunkhwa, Pakistan. The college is affiliated with University of Peshawar for its degree programs.

== See also ==
- Edwardes College Peshawar
- Islamia College Peshawar
- Government College Peshawar
- Government Superior Science College Peshawar
- Government Degree College Naguman Peshawar
- Government Degree College Mathra Peshawar
- Government Degree College Badaber Peshawar
- Government Degree College Wadpagga Peshawar
- Government Degree College Achyni Payan Peshawar
