= Henry Flavelle Forbes =

Irish-born British Indian civil servant

Henry Flavelle Forbes (1877 – 30 November 1959) was a member of the Imperial Civil Service who played a notable part in the modern history of Iraq.

== Biography ==
Forbes was born in 1877 in South Dublin, Ireland, of the United Kingdom of Great Britain and Ireland. Educated at Wesley College in Dublin, he graduated from Trinity College, Dublin University, where he was a Senior Exhibitioner in History and Politics.

He joined the Imperial Civil Service and eventually attained the position of judge in British India. He married Muriel Jessie Handyside in 1914 in India. From 1916–1920, he was stationed in Mesopatamia as part of the Mesopotamian campaign of the First World War, which was largely run by the British India office and included many Indian soldiers. There, he served as a judicial commissioner.

Forbes was made a Companion of the Most Eminent Order of the Indian Empire in 1919 for services in the Indian Political Department "in, and in connection with, the Military Operations in Mesopotamia." As President of the Court of Appeal in Iraq, he wrote a substantial review of one of the more significant civil laws that had been inherited from the Ottoman government.

In the summer of 1920, the pair left Iraq for home leave in Great Britain and travel in Europe. Afterward, they returned to Simla and the Punjab, and Henry resumed his judicial and administrative work with the India department.

== Muriel Forbes ==
Muriel Jesse Handyside (1884–1969) was a Scottish expatriate born to a business family in Peterhof, Russia. She was the sister of a senior officer of the Indian Police Service, Eric Charles Handyside. After her marriage to Henry in India in 1914, she stayed in India initially, but followed her husband to Baghdad in the nascent state of Mandatory Iraq from 1919–1920. There, she started a push to establish a new library for the population, despite not knowing any Arabic herself. Her initiative was successful; she raised enough funds, donations, and a site to establish the Baghdad Peace Library (Maktabat al-Salam). Sometimes this act is incorrectly attributed to Gertrude Bell; while Bell attended a library promotional meeting in November 1919 and would later serve as President of the Library Committee after its establishment, Forbes was the founder. The library would eventually go on to become the basis of the Iraq National Library and Archive.

Muriel Forbes died in 1969 in Gloucestershire, England.
