= Urtsuniwar =

Dialect of the Chitrali Kalasha language

- Urchuniwar
- اُرچؕنوار
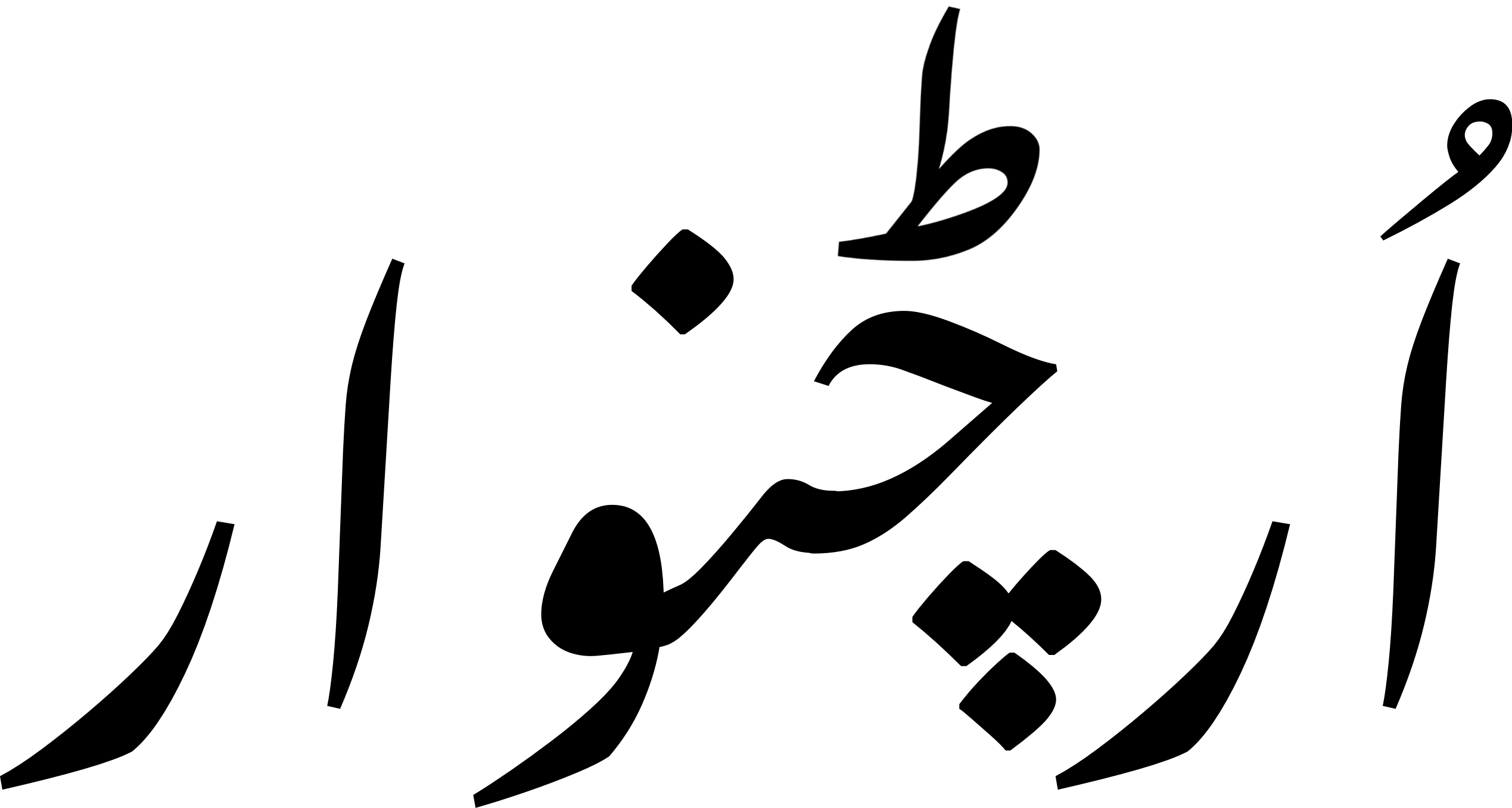
- Native to: Pakistan
- Region: Urtsun Valley
- Ethnicity: Southern Kalash
- Native speakers: (2,900–5,700 cited 1992)
- Language family: Indo-European: Indo-Iranian; Indo-Aryan; Dardic?; Chitrali; Chitrali Kalasha; Urtsuniwar
- Writing system: Perso-Arabic script (Nastaliq)

Language codes
- ISO 639-3: None (mis)

Urtsuniwar or Urchuniwar (اُرچؕنوار) is a dialect of the Kalasha-mun spoken in the Urtsun Valley of Chitral, Khyber Pakhtunkhwa, Pakistan. The total number of speakers is estimated to be around 2,900–5,700 peoples.

== Similarity ==
It has been debated whether Urtsuniwar is a distinct language or a dialect of Kalasha-mun. Urtsuniwar and Kalasha-mun exhibit 70% mutual intelligibility. Urtsuniwar also shares some similarities with the Ushojo.

== History ==
The Kafirs of Urtsun were among the last pagans in Afghanistan and Pakistan to convert to Islam in the mid-1900s. The last Urtsun Kafir was Mranzi, who had married a Kalasha from the Biriu valley and moved out of the valley in 1940, just as the conversion to Islam was completed. They renamed their language from Kalasha-mun to Urtsuniwar and later borrowed heavily from the Khowar, changing their identity. Subsequently, Urtsuniwar started to diverge into a distinct dialect of Kalasha-mun.
