= Kalasha language =

Indo-Aryan language spoken in Chitral

Kalasha
- Kal'as'amondr / کاࣇاشؕا موندر
- Native to: Lower Chitral
- Region: Kalasha Desh
- Ethnicity: Kalash
- Native speakers: 7,500 (2023)
- Language family: Indo-European: Indo-Iranian; Indo-Aryan; Dardic; Chitrali; Kalasha
- Dialects: Urtsuniwar
- Writing system: Arabic script, Latin script

Language codes
- ISO 639-3: kls
- Glottolog: kala1372
- ELP: Kalasha
- Linguasphere: 59-AAB-ab

Kalasha (IPA: [kaɫaʂaː], locally: Kal'as'amondr) is a Dardic Indo-Aryan language spoken by the Kalash people, in the Kalasha Valleys of Lower Chitral District, in northern Khyber Pakhtunkhwa, Pakistan. There are an estimated 7,466 speakers of Kalasha according to the 2023 Census of Pakistan. It is an endangered language and there is an ongoing language shift to Khowar.

Kalasha should not be confused with the nearby Nuristani Kalasha (known as "Kalasha-ala" or "Waigali"), which is a Nuristani language. According to Badshah Munir Bukhari, a researcher on the Kalash, "Kalasha" is also the ethnic name for the Nuristani inhabitants of a region southwest of the Kalasha Valleys, in the Waygal and middle Pech Valleys of Afghanistan's Nuristan Province. The name "Kalasha" seems to have been adopted for the Kalash people by the Kalasha speakers of Chitral from the Nuristanis of Waygal, who for a time expanded up to southern Chitral several centuries ago. However, there is no close connection between the Indo-Aryan language Kalasha-mun (Kalasha) and the Nuristani language Kalasha-ala (Waigali), which descend from different branches of the Indo-Iranian languages.

Kalasha, alongside Khowar, retain some archaic features of the Indo-Aryan languages, such as archaic Vedic Sanskrit vocabulary, sibilants, and several types of consonant clusters long lost in others.

== History ==
Early scholars to have done work on Kalasha include the 19th-century orientalist Gottlieb Wilhelm Leitner and the 20th-century linguist Georg Morgenstierne. More recently, studies have been undertaken by Elena Bashir and several others. The development of practical literacy materials has been associated with the Kalasha linguist Taj Khan Kalash. The Southern Kalash or Urtsun Kalash shifted to a Khowar-influenced dialect of Kalasha-mun in the 20th century called Urtsuniwar.

== Classification ==
Of all the languages in Pakistan, Kalasha is likely the most conservative, along with the nearby language Khowar. In a few cases, Kalasha is even more conservative than Khowar, e.g. in retaining voiced aspirate consonants, which have disappeared from most other Dardic languages.

Some of the typical retentions of sounds and clusters (and meanings) are seen in the following list. However, note some common New Indo-Aryan and Dardic features as well.

== Phonology ==
The Kalasha language is phonologically atypical because it contrasts plain, long, nasal and retroflex vowels as well as combinations of these. Set out below is the phonology of Kalasha:

=== Vowels ===
	Front	Central	Back
Close	i ĩ i˞ ĩ˞		u ũ u˞ ũ˞
Mid	e ẽ e˞ ẽ˞		o õ o˞ õ˞
Open		a ã a˞ ã˞	

=== Consonants ===
As with other Dardic languages, the phonemic status of the breathy voiced series is debatable. Some analyses are unsure of whether they are phonemic or allophonic—i.e., the regular pronunciations of clusters of voiced consonants with /h/.

		Labial	Alveolar	Retroflex	(Alveolo)- Palatal	Velar	Uvular	Glottal
Nasal		m	n	(ɳ)	(ɲ)	(ŋ)		
Stop	voiceless	p	t	ʈ		k	(q)	
Stop	voiced	b	d	ɖ		ɡ		
Stop	aspirated	pʰ	tʰ	ʈʰ		kʰ		
Stop	breathy voiced	bʱ	dʱ	ɖʱ		ɡʱ		
Affricate	voiceless		ts	tʂ	tɕ			
Affricate	voiced		dz	dʐ	dʑ			
Affricate	aspirated		tsʰ	tʂʰ	tɕʰ			
Affricate	breathy voiced				dʑʱ			
Fricative	voiceless		s	ʂ	ɕ	(x)		h
Fricative	voiced		z	ʐ	ʑ	(ɣ)		
Approximant			l ɫ		j	w		
Rhotic			r	(ɽ)				

The phonemes /x ɣ q/ are found in loanwords.

=== Vocabulary comparison ===
The following table compares Kalash words to their cognates in other Indo-Aryan languages.

English	Kalasha	Sanskrit	other Indo-Aryan languages
bone	athi, aṭhí	asthi	Nepali: ā̃ṭh 'the ribs'
urine	mutra, mútra	mūtra	Hindi: mūt; Assamese: mut
village	grom	grāma	Hindi: gā̃w; Assamese: gãü
rope	rajuk, raĵhú-k	rajju	Hindi: lej, lejur; Assamese: lezu
smoke	thum	dhūma	Hindi: dhūā̃, dhuwā̃; Assamese: dhü̃a
meat	mos	maṃsa	Hindi: mā̃s, mās, māsā
dog	shua, śõ.'a	śvan	Sinhala: suvan
ant	pililak, pilílak	pipīla, pippīlika	Hindi: pipṛā; Assamese: pipora
son	put, putr	putra	Hindi: pūt; Assamese: put
long	driga, dríga	dīrgha	Hindi: dīha; Assamese: digha
eight	asht, aṣṭ	aṣṭā	Hindi: āṭh; Assamese: ath
broken	china, čhína	chinna	Hindi: chīn-nā 'to snatch'
kill	nash	nash, naś, naśyati	Hindi: nā̆s 'destroy'

== Conservative traits ==
Examples of conservative features in Kalasha and Khowar are (note, NIA = New Indo-Aryan, MIA = Middle Indo-Aryan, OIA = Old Indo-Aryan):

- Preservation of intervocalic /m/ (reduced to a nasalized /w/ or /v/ in late MIA elsewhere), e.g. Kal. grom, Kho. gram "village" < OIA grāma
- Non-deletion of intervocalic /t/, preserved as /l/ or /w/ in Kalasha, /r/ in Khowar (deleted in middle MIA elsewhere), e.g. Kho. brār "brother" < OIA bhrātṛ; Kal. ʃau < *ʃal, Kho. ʃor "hundred" < OIA śata
- Preservation of the distinction between all three OIA sibilants (dental /s/, palatal /ś/, retroflex /ṣ/); in most of the subcontinent, these three had already merged before 200 BC (early MIA)
- Preservation of sibilant + consonant, stop + /r/ clusters (lost by early MIA in most other places):
  - Kal. aṣṭ, Kho. oṣṭ "eight" < OIA aṣṭā; Kal. hast, Kho. host "hand" < OIA hasta; Kal. istam "bunch" < OIA stamba; Kho. istōr "pack horse" < OIA sthōra; Kho. isnār "bathed" < OIA snāta; Kal. Kho. iskow "peg" < OIA *skabha (< skambha); Kho. iśper "white" < OIA śvēta; Kal. isprɛs, Kho. iśpreṣi "mother-in-law" < OIA śvaśru; Kal. piṣṭ "back" < OIA pṛṣṭha; Kho. aśrū "tear" < OIA aśru.
  - Kho. kren- "buy" < OIA krīṇ-; Kal. grom, Kho. grom "village" < OIA grāma; Kal. gŕä "neck" < OIA grīva; Kho. griṣp "summer" < OIA grīṣma
- Preservation of /ts/ in Kalasha (reinterpreted as a single phoneme)
- Direct preservation of many OIA case endings as so-called "layer 1" case endings (as opposed to newer "layer 2" case endings, typically tacked onto a layer-1 oblique case):
  - Nominative
  - Oblique (Animate): Pl. Kal. -an, Kho. -an < OIA -ān
  - Genitive: Kal. -as (sg.), -an (pl.); Kho. -o (sg.), -an, -ān (pl.) < OIA -asya (sg.), āṇām (pl.)
  - Dative: Kal. -a, Kho. -a < OIA dative -āya, elsewhere lost already in late OIA
  - Instrumental: Kal. -an, Kho. -en < OIA -ēna
  - Ablative: Kal. -au, Kho. -ār < OIA -āt
  - Locative: Kal. -ai, Kho. -i < OIA -ai
- Preservation of more than one verbal conjugation (e.g. Kho. mār-īm "I kill" vs. bri-um "I die")
- Preservation of OIA distinction between "primary" (non-past) and "secondary" (past) endings and of a past-tense "augment" in a-, both lost entirely elsewhere: Kal. pim "I drink", apis "I drank"; kārim "I do", akāris "I did"
- Preservation of a verbal preterite tense (see examples above), with normal nominative/accusative marking and normal verbal agreement, as opposed to the ergative-type past tenses with nominal-type agreement elsewhere in NIA (originally based on a participial passive construction)

== Bibliography ==
- Heegård, Jan; Mørch, Ida Elisabeth (March 2004). "Retroflex vowels and other peculiarities in Kalasha sound system". In Anju Saxena; Jadranka Gvozdanovic (eds.). Synchronic and Diachronic Aspects of Himalayan Linguistics. Selected Proceedings of the 7th Himalayan Languages Symposium held in Uppsala, Sweden. The Hague: Mouton.
- Heegård Petersen, Jan (30 September 2015). "Kalasha texts – With introductory grammar". Acta Linguistica Hafniensia. 47 (sup1): 1–275. doi:10.1080/03740463.2015.1069049. ISSN 0374-0463. S2CID 218660179.
- Kochetov, Alexei; Arsenault, Paul (2008), Retroflex harmony in Kalasha: Agreement or spreading? (PDF), NELS, vol. 39, Cornell University, archived from the original (PDF) on 22 June 2011
- Trail, Ronald L.; Cooper, Gregory R. (1999). Kalasha dictionary—with English and Urdu. Studies in Languages of Northern Pakistan. Vol. 7. Islamabad: National Institute of Pakistan Studies, Quaid-i-Azam University and Summer Institute of Linguistics. ISBN 4871875237.
