= Eric Charles Handyside =

Eric Charles Handyside (3 November 1881 – 1 April 1926) was a British policeman who served as Officiating Commandant of the North West Frontier Police in what is today Pakistan. Handyside received several commendations for his service.

Handyside was born in St. Petersburg, Russia, a son of James Andrew Handyside, a Scottish merchant resident there, and his wife, the former Jessie McIntosh. His sister, Muriel Handyside, established a library in Baghdad that became one of the few public libraries in Iraq in the 1920s.

Handyside joined the Indian Police Service in Punjab in 1901 as an Assistant Superintendent, and was promoted to Superintendent in 1909. In 1913, he transferred to the North West Frontier Police and in 1920 was promoted to Senior Superintendent. He became District Superintendent in Peshawar in 1921. In 1922, Handyside was named as Officiating Commandant, N.W.F.P. and was confirmed in that post in 1924.

In 1911, Handyside was awarded the King's Police Medal for his part in capturing a gang of escaped convicts. He was awarded a Bar to his King's Police Medal in 1918. He was ‘mentioned in despatches’ for distinguished service in support of the military operations during the Waziristan Revolt in 1919–20. In 1921, Handyside was appointed an Officer of the Order of the British Empire (O.B.E.) "for services during the operations against Afghanistan". In 1923, he was appointed Companion of the Indian Empire (C.I.E.).

Handyside was killed in action in Mathra, near Peshawar, during a routine operation to arrest two outlaws in 1926. In a tribute paid to him in the British House of Commons, the Earl Winterton, Under-Secretary of State for India, noted that "During 14 years' service on the frontier he established a reputation for personal bravery, tenacity and chivalry that has rarely been equalled."

== Bibliography ==
- Coatman, J. Eric Charles Handyside, C.I.E., O.B.E., Indian Police. Tunbridge Wells, c. 1962.
