= Tach Sharakat =

Pakistani activist and linguist

- Born: Taj Khan Kalash; Bumburet, Kalasha Desh, Pakistan
- Education: Edwardes College (B.A.); Aristotle University of Thessaloniki (B.A.); Central European University (M.A.)
- Website: www.KalashaPeople.org

Tach Sharakat Kalash (born Taj Kalas) belongs to an endangered Indigenous culture and language community Kalasha (an Indigenous people group) living in the wilderness of Hindu Kush Mountains in the Chitral district of Pakistan. Kalasha are the last remaining pagan tribe numbering 4000 people speaking the ancient Indo-Aryan language Kalasha-mondr. They practice a polytheistic ancestral belief system and Pre-Islamic culture dating back to 3000 B.C.

Tach is one of the first literates among Kalasha People to have received a BA in Political science and Law at Edwardes College Peshawar Pakistan, a 2nd BA in English Literature and Linguistics at Aristotle University of Thessaloniki and MA Human Rights from Central European University Budapest, Hungary.

Tach has made first Kalasha indigenous documentary film Kalasha about his people as part of anthropological documentation and advocacy for Kalasha people's linguistic rights in education and cultural autonomy. He is also writer of first hand report on "Kalasha Mythology, herbs and Shamanic practices". Tach has been a spokesman for Kalasha with his linguistic skills speaking four Asiatic and three European languages besides his mother tongue.

Working in close collaboration with various international researchers and linguists Taj organized first Kalasha Orthography Conference 2000 in Islamabad, Pakistan. In 2004 he was able to raise funds to publish first alphabet book of Kalasha language based on Roman script designed by an Australian linguist Gregory R. Cooper.

Tach's struggles for survival and development of Kalasha language are featured in a recent documentary film called The Alphabet Book produced by Pattern films. He is currently working on developing Kalasha Literacy Project that involves documentation of Kalash language and Oral historical data by compilation of textbooks and literacy materials in Kalasha language.

== See also ==
- Kalasha People
- Kalash language
- Bumburet
- Kafiristan
