= English immersion resources for immigrant students =

English immersion programs allow students to be fully immersed in the American culture, which starts by learning its language — English. A number of those who enroll in English immersion programs are immigrant children. Due to the fact that more ambitious choices are made by immigrant students than nonimmigrant students regarding academic choices, secondary effects, such as these English immersion programs, create positive outcomes. Immigrant children are defined as children who have at least one foreign born parent. Some immigrant students show proficiency in English after being in the program for only 2–3 years while others take longer. There are not many other resources provided by schools that students can go to if they want to learn or improve their English. As a result, it can possibly affect immigrant students' proficiency in English.

== Programs ==
There are two types of English immersion programs:

- Structured: Structured immersion programs help students focus on building a vocabulary. This type of program helps the students to learn English faster so that they will be able to join the regular classes with the majority of their classmates.
- Submersion: Submersion-type immersion programs are a sink or swim kind of program. This type of immersion does not provide the student with any kind of assistance. It is up to the student's ability to learn and understand the language on their own. Most immersion programs have students focus on developing English proficiency only. English immersion programs do this by having the students be exposed to the language directly.

== Student population ==
With an increase in the immigrant student population, English immersion resources help immigrant students adjust to the U.S. In public elementary schools, they have seen a new rise in immigrant enrollment. "In the 10 years between 1996 and 2006, the number of ELL students enrolled in U.S. elementary and secondary schools has grown approximately 57 percent, while the general school population has grown only 3.7 percent". The population of ELL students has significantly grown over the years. With current increasing immigration and birth rates of immigrant children, the ELL student population in U.S. elementary schools will get even bigger.

== Available resources ==
There aren't many English immersion resources that are available for immigrant students. The most common English immersion program is ESL. The ESL program is a submersion-type of English immersion. The program is for students whose main language is not English. The goal of the program is to increase students' English proficiency so that they can meet academic standards and do well in classrooms. In California, twenty-five percent of the student population in all public schools are in the ESL program. The Census Bureau claims there was about 31.8 million individuals whose primary language was not English in 1990. In the year 2000, it rose to 47 million, which is 18% of the population. Also, in the United States, there are more than 3.7 million public-school students whose English proficiency is limited, and similar to the Census Bureau, the number will rise. Immigrant students' success or failure in school depends on the kind of assistance they receive. ELL students constantly have lower scores in reading and mathematics than their non-ELL peers. An article showed that there is a relationship between poor academic achievement and high dropout rates. The No Child Left Behind Act (NCLB) hold schools responsible for their students' academic achievement.

== Improved English proficiency ==
In a study about the benefits of a second language immersion elementary school program, the findings showed positive results. The participants that were involved were 106 French-speaking eight-year-old children. They were separated into two groups. 53 children who were enrolled in English immersion classes since when they were five years old were classified in one group. The second group is 53 children who were enrolled in monolingual classes. Results showed that the kids who were enrolled in English immersion classes gained some cognitive benefits such as auditory selective attention, divided attention, and mental flexibility. In another study about the effectiveness of two-year oral English programs conducted on 534 Hispanic ELL students, it was concluded that English immersion programs are needed to accelerate oral English acquisition.

== Alternatives to ESL Programs ==
Although ESL (English as a Second Language) programs are much more common in the United States, many studies have found that dual language education is more effective in closing the achievement gap for students who are learning English as a second language. "With respect to the ultimate goal for ELs [English Learners], the policy of transitional bilingual education, or ESL programs whose aims are English language proficiency and assimilation, is explicitly non-bilingual." While conducting many different studies in 15 different states in both large and small school districts, Collier and Thomas (2004) found that dual language education is the only way for English learners to close the achievement gap. ESL programs separate students from mainstream classrooms. "English learner programs often place students in modified instruction, which translates to less linguistically and academically rigorous instruction than mainstream instruction." Alternatively, dual language programs keep students together and allow all students to become fluent in both languages. While this may seem like an ideal solution, there is one notable conflict: not all ESL students speak one common language. It would be nearly impossible to offer dual language programs in the first language of every student in the school. This being said, it is still important to note that many immigrant students do share a common language in certain areas. For example, in states like California and Texas that are very close to the Mexican border, Spanish is the most popular language among immigrant students. In these areas it could be very beneficial for Spanish-speaking students to have dual language programs.

== Controversy ==
Some people criticize that it is costly to offer a variety of English immersion resources. For example, for just the ESL program, "...38% of eligible Texas students are served in ESL programs and are the most expensive to operate since ESL teachers must be hired to attend to pull-out students". Training for regular teachers may also need to be provided so that they are qualified to teach ESL students. An ESL Generalist certification is required to teach in the ESL program. The average cost for a student in ESL is $2,687. Along with the cost of these resources, another criticism of these English immersion resources is that they do not support most of these ELL students. Some of these ELL students do not even receive specialized language services in their schools, specifically 11.7% of ELL students.
