= Mathra, Khyber Pakhtunkhwa =

Mathra
- Village
- Location in Pakistan Mathra (Pakistan)
- Coordinates: 34.106446°N 71.478739°E
- Country: Pakistan
- Province: Khyber-Pakhtunkhwa
- District: Peshawar District

Mathra (like Muttra, a corruption of Mathura, the original name) is a village 10 km from Peshawar in Khyber Pakhtunkhwa province of Pakistan. It is also the central village of Tehsil Mathra.

== Administrative area ==
Mathra village is located on the main Warsak Road. It has a police station, Government Girls and Boys degree colleges, hospital, and a busy regional market.

Mathra also gives its name to Mathra Tehsil, comprising 54 village or neighborhood councils, ranging from Kafor Dheri in the west to Haryana Bala in the east and from the village Darmangi in the south to Bela, and Mamo Khatki in the north. In the north is connected to District Mom and, in the west to District Khyber. Patwar circles of Mathra Qanungo Halqa is part of Pakistan National Assembly seat NA-2 (Peshawar-2) while Mathra Qanungo Halqa, excluding the patwar circles of Regi Uftazai and Regi Lalma, is part of NA-3 (Peshawar) For the KP Provincial Assembly, the entirety of Mathra Qanungo Halqa comes in PK-69 (Peshawar).

== History ==
In April 1926, one of the most famous policemen in India, Eric Handyside, Commandant, North West Frontier Police, was killed in action in Mathra during a routine operation to arrest two outlaws.

== Educational Institutes ==
Hira Model School Mathra

- Government Degree College Mathra Peshawar
- Government Girls Degree College Mathra Peshawar

== See also ==
- Peshawar
- Peshawar District
