= Board of Intermediate and Secondary Education, Peshawar =

Education board in Khyber Pakhtunkhwa, Pakistan

- د منځني او ثانوي زده کړو هیئت، پېښور; BISE Peshawar
- Logo of Board of Intermediate and Secondary Education, Peshawar

Education Board overview
- Formed: 1961
- Type: Government
- Headquarters: Peshawar
- Education Board executive: Chairman of the board; Secretary
- Website: bisep.8171ehsaas.com

The Board of Intermediate and Secondary Education, Peshawar or BISE Peshawar is a government examinations conducting and assessment body at the intermediate and secondary education levels. It is located in Peshawar, Khyber Pakhtunkhwa, Pakistan.

== History ==
BISE Peshawar was established in 1961 by the Government of Khyber Pakhtunkhwa. Previously, it conducted the examination of intermediate and secondary education for students throughout the Khyber Pakhtunkhwa province but, with the establishment of new educational boards in Khyber Pakhtunkhwa, its jurisdiction is now Peshawar Division.

== Jurisdiction ==
The jurisdiction of BISE Peshawar includes the following districts:

- Mohmand District
- Charsadda District
- Chitral District
- Peshawar District
- Khyber District

== See also ==
- List of educational boards in Pakistan
- Federal Board of Intermediate and Secondary Education, Islamabad
- Board of Intermediate and Secondary Education, Abbottabad
