= Islamia College University =

Public university in Peshawar, Pakistan

Islamia College Peshawar اسلامیہ کالج پشاور
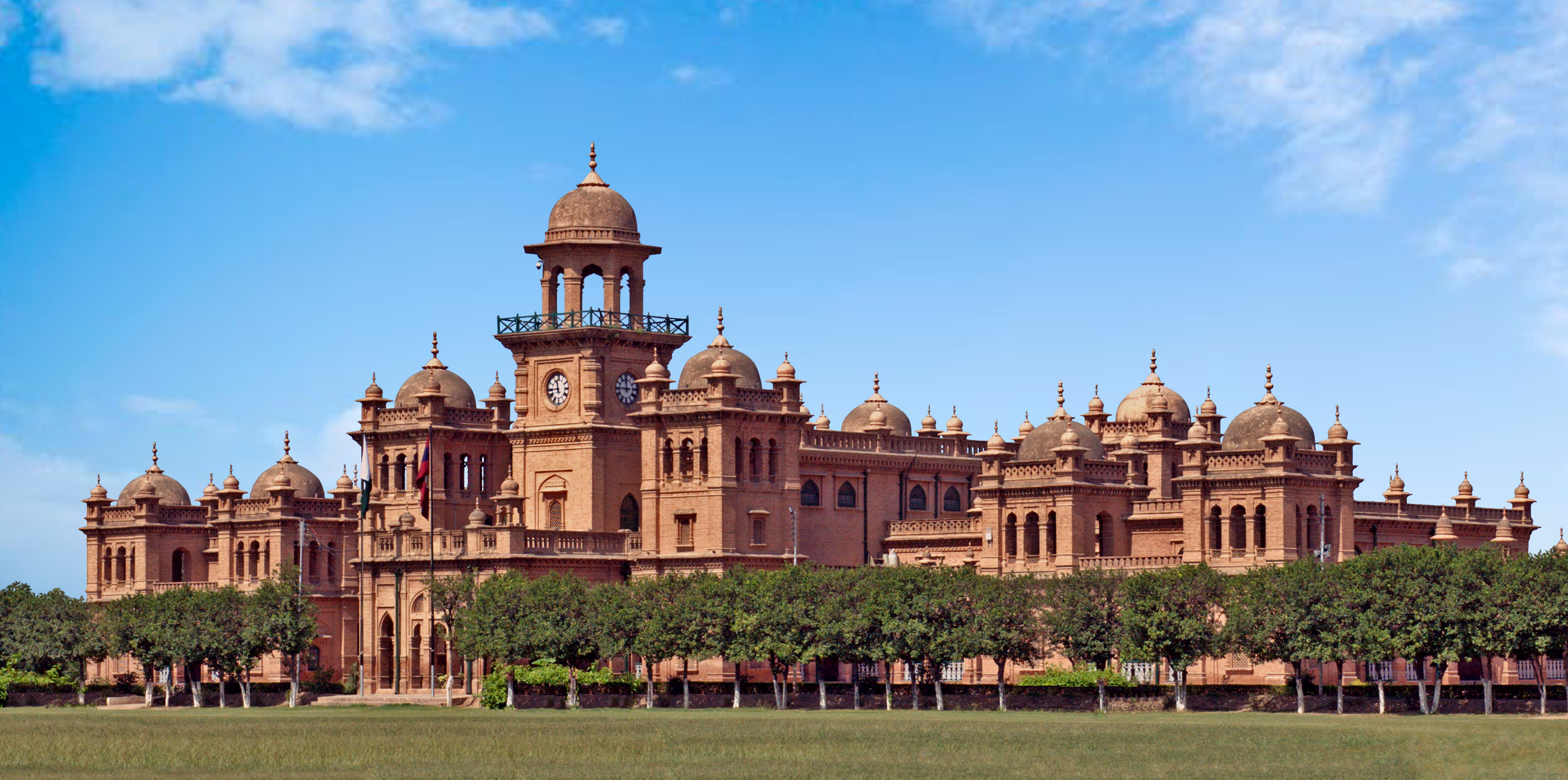
- Main building
- Motto: رَبِّ زدْنيِ عِلْماً
- Motto in English: O Allah, Increase my Knowledge; Creating new leadership...
- Type: Public university
- Established: 1913; 113 years ago
- Affiliations: Higher Education Commission of Pakistan
- Academic affiliations: Higher Education Commission of Pakistan
- Chancellor: Governor of Khyber-Pakhtunkhwa
- Vice-Chancellor: Prof. Dr Zia Ul Haq
- Dean: Five Deans
- Academic staff: About 500
- Students: more than 5000
- Location: Peshawar, Khyber-Pakhtunkhwa, Pakistan; 33°59′58.5″N 71°28′33.31″E
- Campus: Urban
- Language: Urdu English
- Colors: Blue, maroon
- Website: www.icp.edu.pk

Islamia College University Peshawar (ICP) (Urdu: اسلامیہ کالج پشاور) is a public university located in Peshawar, Khyber Pakhtunkhwa, Pakistan.

== Degrees awarded ==
Initially established as a college, Islamia College Peshawar awarded higher secondary school certificates. It was later converted into a university and now also awards numerous undergraduate and postgraduate degrees in the fields of Arts & Humanities, Business & Social Sciences, Language & Cultural, Engineering and Science & Technology.

This university is ranked 24th on the List of Top Universities in Khyber Pakhtunkhwa in 2022.

== Recognized university ==
This university is recognized by the Higher Education Commission of Pakistan.

== History ==
Founded by Sir S.A. Qayyum and Sir George Roos-Keppel in 1913, it is one of the oldest institutions of higher education in Pakistan, and its historical roots are traced from the culminating point of the Aligarh Movement. The university provides higher learning in arts, languages, humanities, social sciences and modern sciences. In 1950, the University of Peshawar was founded as an offshoot of Islamia College Peshawar, with the later being associated to the university as a constituent college. Initially established as Islamia College, it was granted university status by the Government of Pakistan in 2008; the word college is retained in its title for preserving its historical roots.

This picture is from 1917, Darband. In this photo: Nawab Sir Muhammad Khan Zaman Khan Tanoli (seated second from left), Sir George Roos-Keppel (seated third from left), Sahibzada Sir Abdul Qayyum Khan (seated first from right) Thanking to Nawab of Amb for huge amount of Cash donation.

=== Cash Donations by Nawabs ===
On June 2, 1911, a delegation headed by Sahibzaba Abdul Qayyum Khan visited Tangi Tehsil in Charsadda and set up his camp at the historical Hujra of his personal friend the influential Khan of Sherpao, Khan Bahadur Ghulam Haider Khan Muhammadzai, Khan of Sherpao, for collection of donations. The Khan of Sherpao was the largest contributor, having donated the entire sum required for purchase of the expensive land in Peshawar to serve as the campus of the college. The Khans of Tangi donated a handsome amount of Rs.25,000 and the delegation stayed for 3 days at the Sherpao Hujra in Tangi before moving on to the villages of Umarzai, Turangzai and Rajjar where donations of Rs.12,000, Rs.20,000 and Rs.3,000 were collected respectively and finally went on to the village Charsadda. In total Rs 150,000 was collected from the area of Hashtnagar (the former name of the present district of Charsadda in Khyber Pakhtunkhwa). Subsequently, a large plot of land was purchased for the college building from the Khalil (Arbabs) of Tehkal and Sufaid Dheri. Generous contributions of Rs. 150,000/- from Nizam of Hyderabad and the construction cost of the college building paid by the Nawab of Amb of Rs. 100,000/- (sent by the prime minister of Amb Syed Abdul Jabbar Shah to Sahibzada Abdul Qayyum) are also noteworthy.

=== Conception ===
When the new province of Khyber Pakhtunkhwa (previously known as N.W.F.P) was formed in 1901 after its separation from the Punjab, there was only one college (Edwardes College) in whole province. This scarcity of quality educational institutions forced local youth to travel to faraway regions of the country (British India) in pursuit of higher education. This same lack of educational opportunities in the region motivated Nawab Sir Sahibzada Abdul Qayyum and Sir George Roos-Keppel to establish an institution that would not only cater to the academic needs of the region but also produce leaders from the region.

=== Tribal Hostel ICP ===
Founded by Iskander Mirza (former president of Pakistan) on 7 July 1956. The hostel system of Islamia College University, Peshawar exists since 1913. Tribal Hostel is located in the center of Islamia College University, Peshawar.

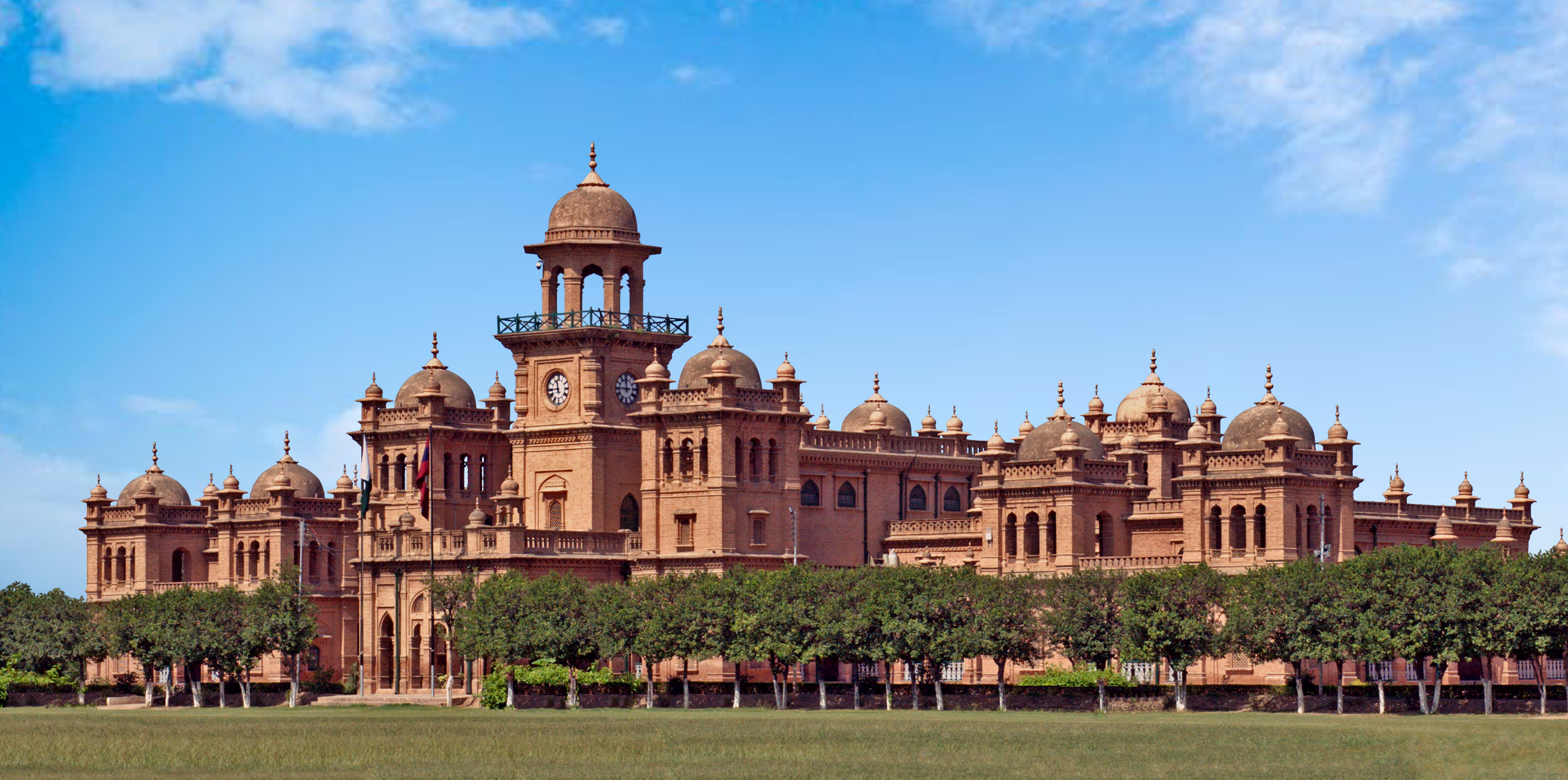
Islamia College Peshawar side view

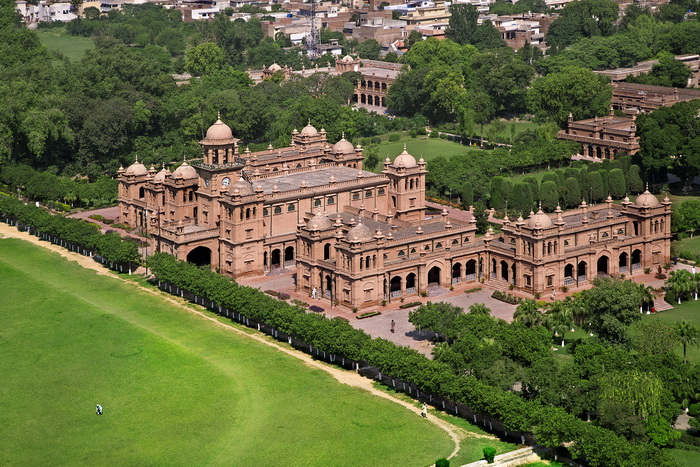
Aerial View of the College Grounds

=== Foundation ===
By 1909, as the idea of a college in the province was taking shape in the minds of both Nawab Sir Sahibzada Abdul Qayyum and Sir George Roos-Keppel, it was further strengthened by their visit to the Aligarh Muslim University the same year. Nawab Sahib asked the students, especially those from the N.W.F.P. who were studying there as to what were the problems they were facing there and how he could help them. The students told him that they needed a hostel. Nawab Sahib informed them that rather than building them a hostel at Aligarh, he would build them a college at Peshawar. Maulana Qutabshah was the first dean of the college.

Consequently, on April 12, 1911, Nawab Sahib arranged a meeting of like minded people in Peshawar at the residence of Abdul Karim, contractor at Peshawar city, which was attended by Ghulam Haider Khan of Tangi Charsadda, Habibullah Khan, Khushal Khan, Sethi Karim Bakhsh, Sir Sahibzada Abdul Qayyum, Khan Sahib Abdul Majid Khan and others. Sir Sahibzada Abdul Qayyum moved the motion for collection of contributions, which was instantly responded to by cash donations by all present. Subsequently, a large plot of land was purchased for the college building from the Khalil (Arbabs) of Tehkal Rs. 150,000/- from Nizam of Hyderabad and the construction cost building Paid by Nawab of Amb Rs 100,000/- was sent by the prime minister of Amb Syed Abdul Jabbar Shah to Sahibzada Abdul Qayyum as donation for the college. Other chiefs and nobles of the North-West Frontier and Punjab, also made various donations.

Haji Sahib of Turangzai, the most famous Pukhtun religious leader of the time was requested by Nawab Sir Sahibzada Abdul Qayyum to lay the foundation stone of Islamia College. Haji Sahib agreed to the request, however, he had been declared a proclaimed offender by the British for his anti-British activities and his entry was banned into British controlled territory. He was residing in tribal territory, which was outside British control, so Nawab Sahib prevailed upon Sir George Roos-Keppel and the British to permit Haji Sahib to enter British controlled territory for one day so he could lay the foundation stone of Islamia College. The British agreed to this request with the understanding that Haji Sahib would return to tribal territory once he had laid the foundation stone. Haji Sahib was permitted to enter British controlled territory for the ceremony and spent the night in the 'Pokh' Mosque of Tehkal. At the foundation stone laying ceremony, Sir Roos Keppel and other British officials were present, so Haji Sahib hid his face in his sheet (Chadar) from them and was led by Sheikh Muhammad Ibrahim to the place where he was to lay the foundation stone. After laying the stone Haji Sahib went to Tehkal and then returned to the tribal territory.

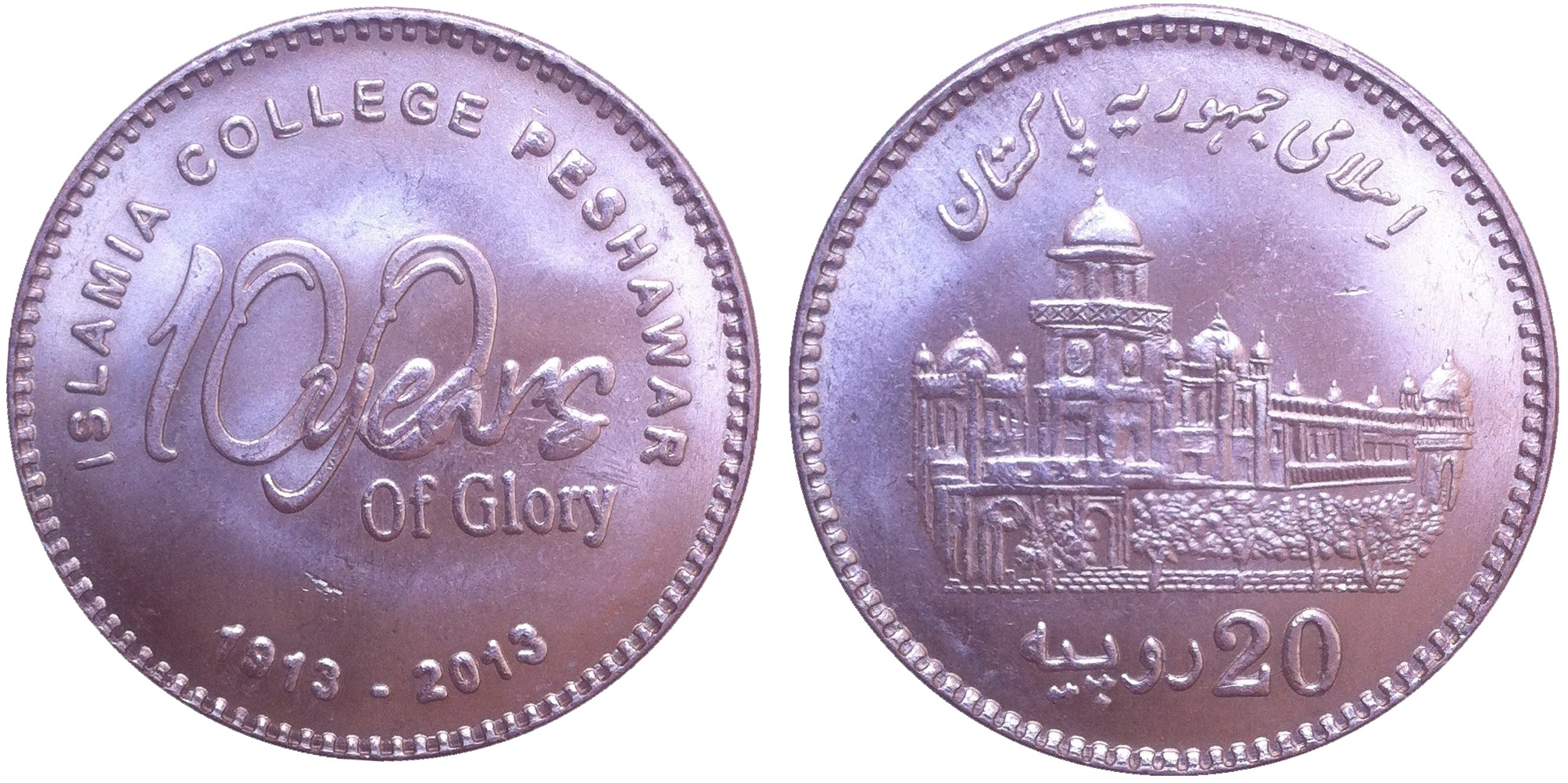
Commemorative coin issued by the State Bank of Pakistan on the Centenary Celebrations of Islamia College Peshawar

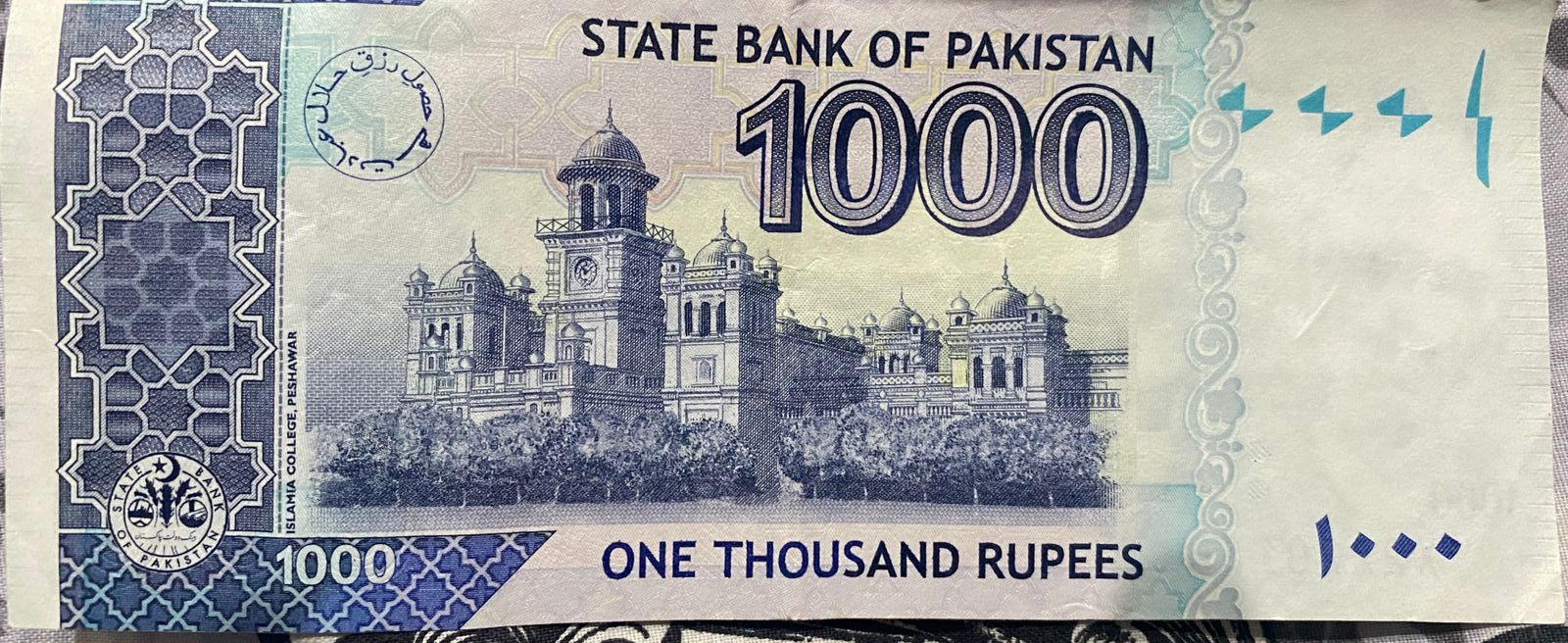
Islamia College on 1000 PKR Note

=== Quaid-e-Azam Muhammad Ali Jinnah's will ===
Quaid-e-Azam Muhammad Ali Jinnah visited this College in 1936, 1945 and 1948. Quaid-e-Azam, who became lifelong honorary member of the Khyber Union ICP in 1936, made the college one of the heirs of his property in 1939:

"All my residuary estate including the corpus that may fall after the lapse of life interest or otherwise to be divided into three parts - and I bequeath one part to Aligarh University - one part to Islamia College Peshawar and one part to Sindh Madrassa of Karachi..." - Quaid-e-Azam's Will, Bombay, May 30, 1939

Addressing the students of the college on April 12, 1948, he said: "Let me tell you that nothing is nearer to my heart than to have a great center of culture and learning in a place like Peshawar, a place from where the rays of knowledge and culture can spread throughout the Middle East and Central Asia."

== Endowment ==
According to the board of trustees, the college, which is spread over 300 acres of land, has 1089 Jaribs cultivable land in Harichand, Rai Killi and Tarnab, (District Charsadda). In addition to this, there are 395 shops and flats in the Khyber Bazaar Peshawar and main bazaar Charsadda.

== Gallery ==
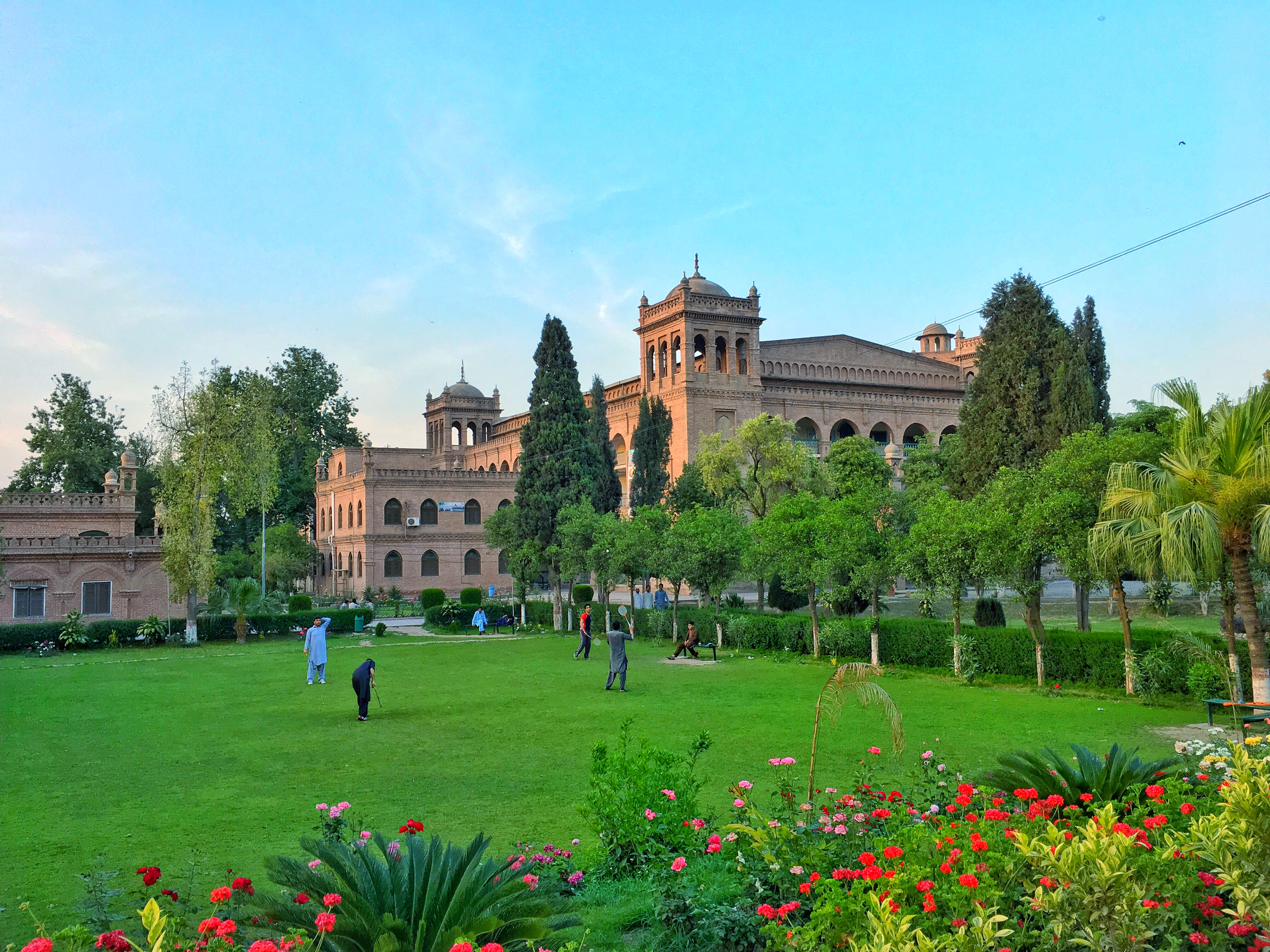
Garden View

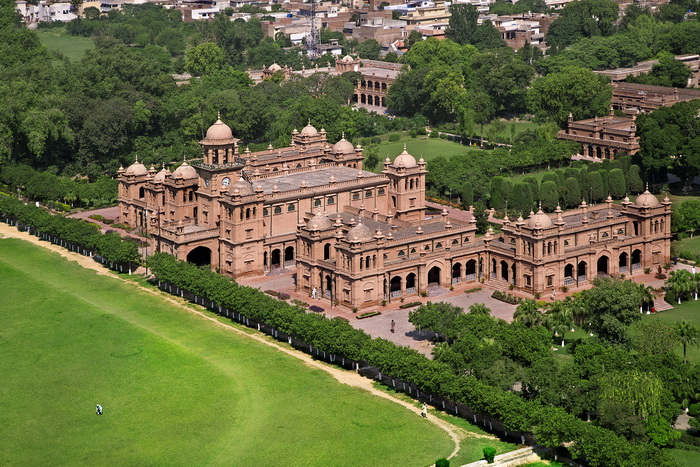
Aerial View

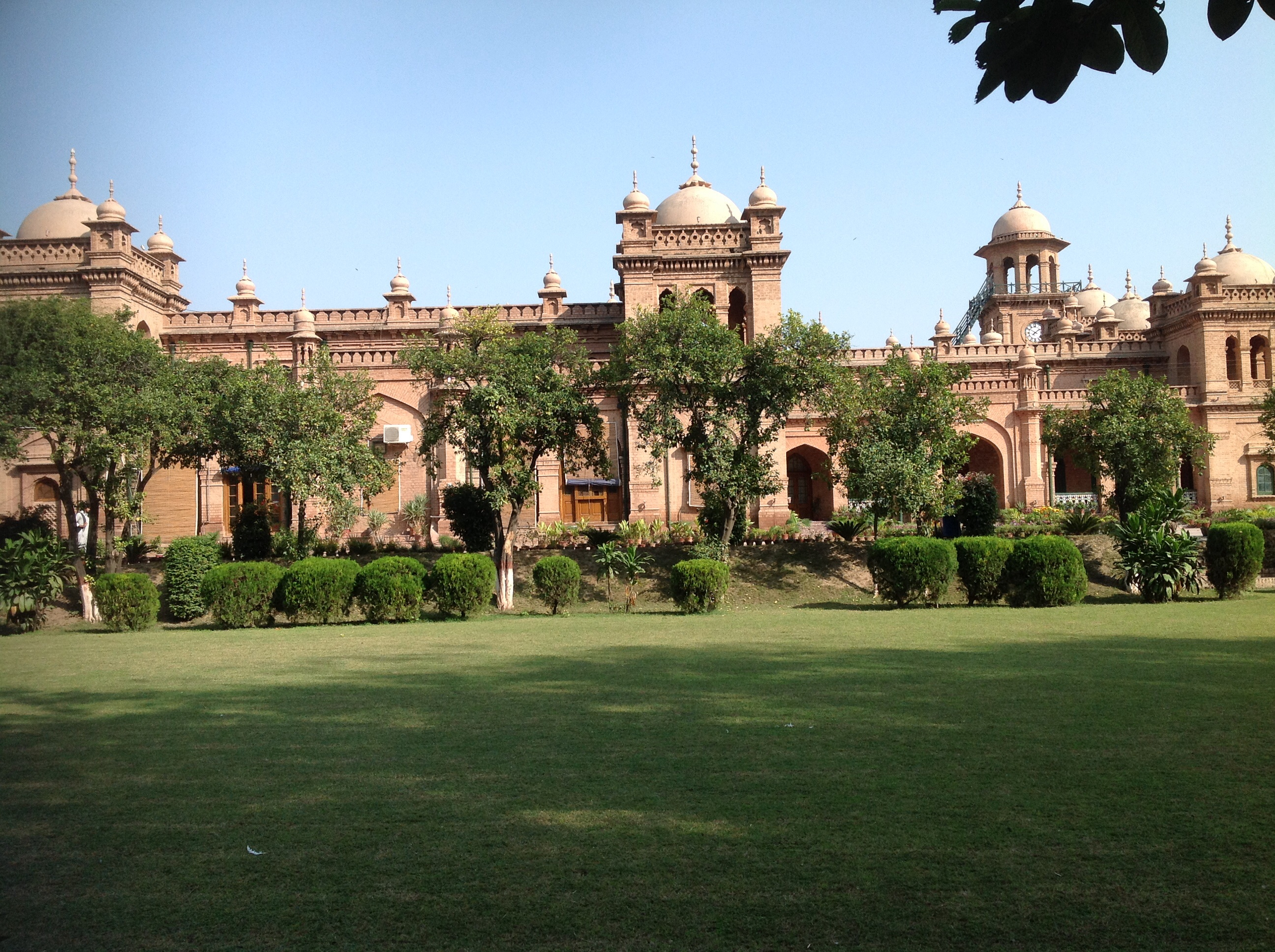
Exterior Day View of ICP

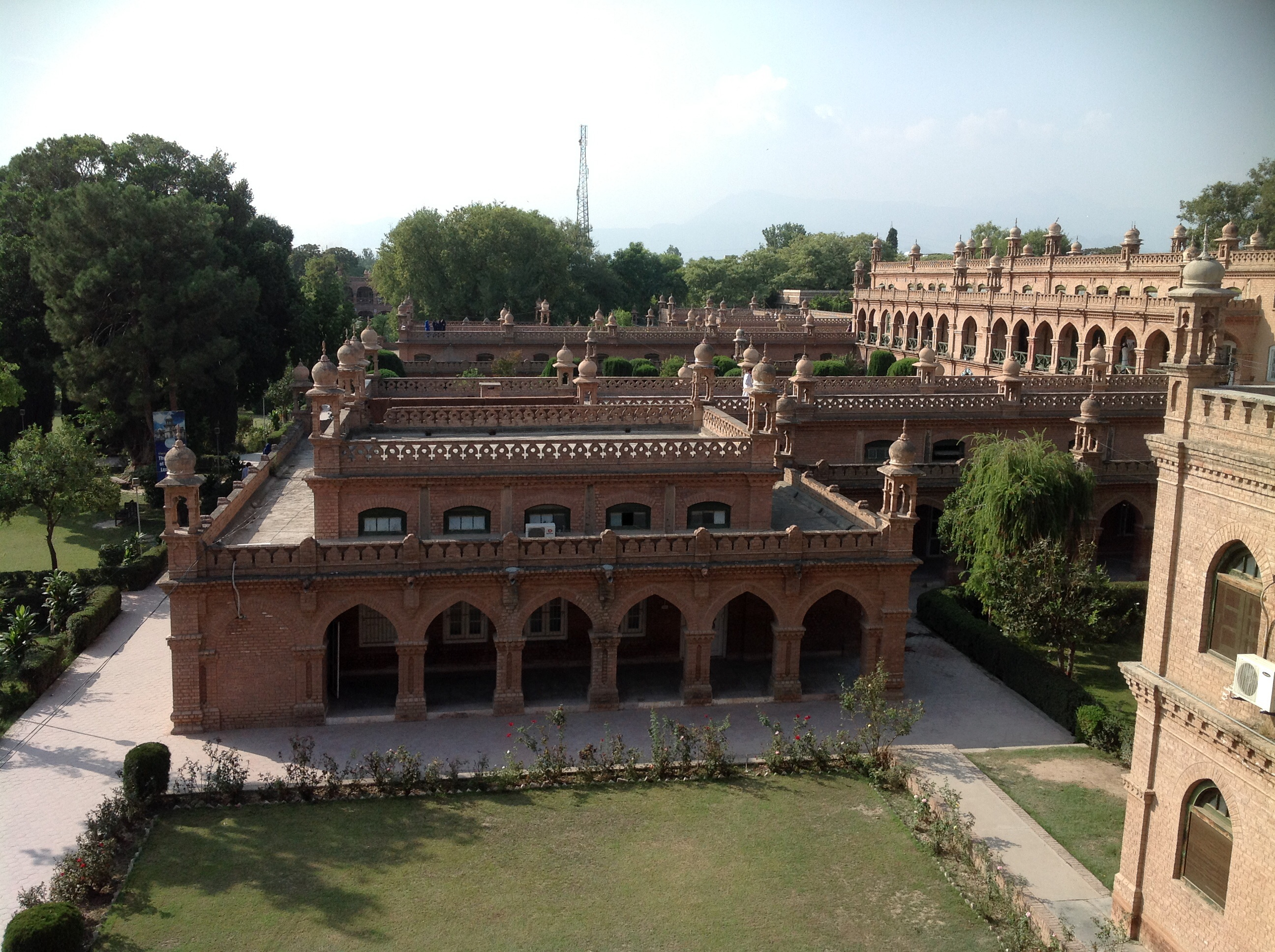
College Departments

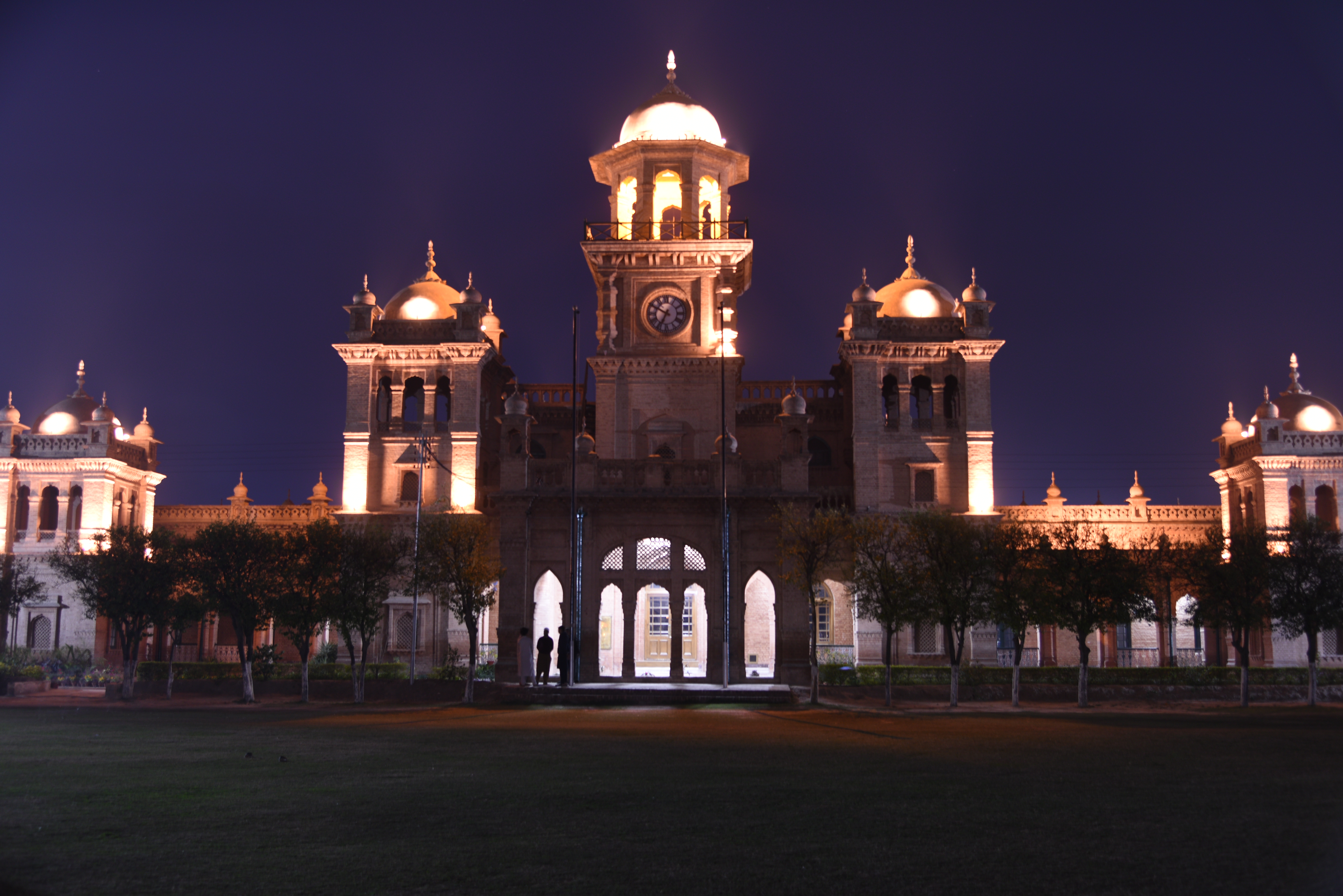
Exterior View, Evening

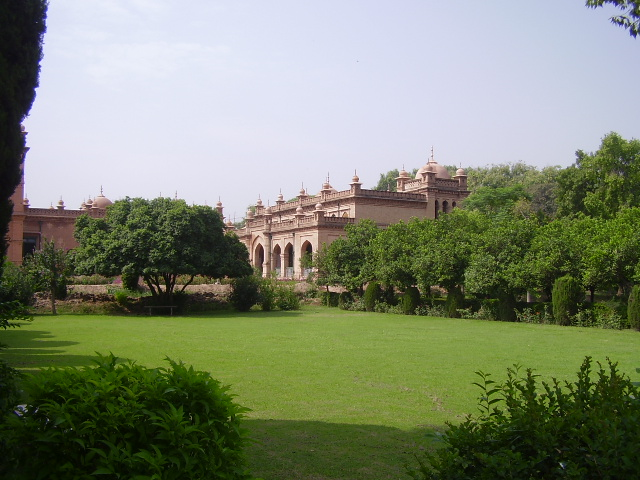
Additional Garden Image

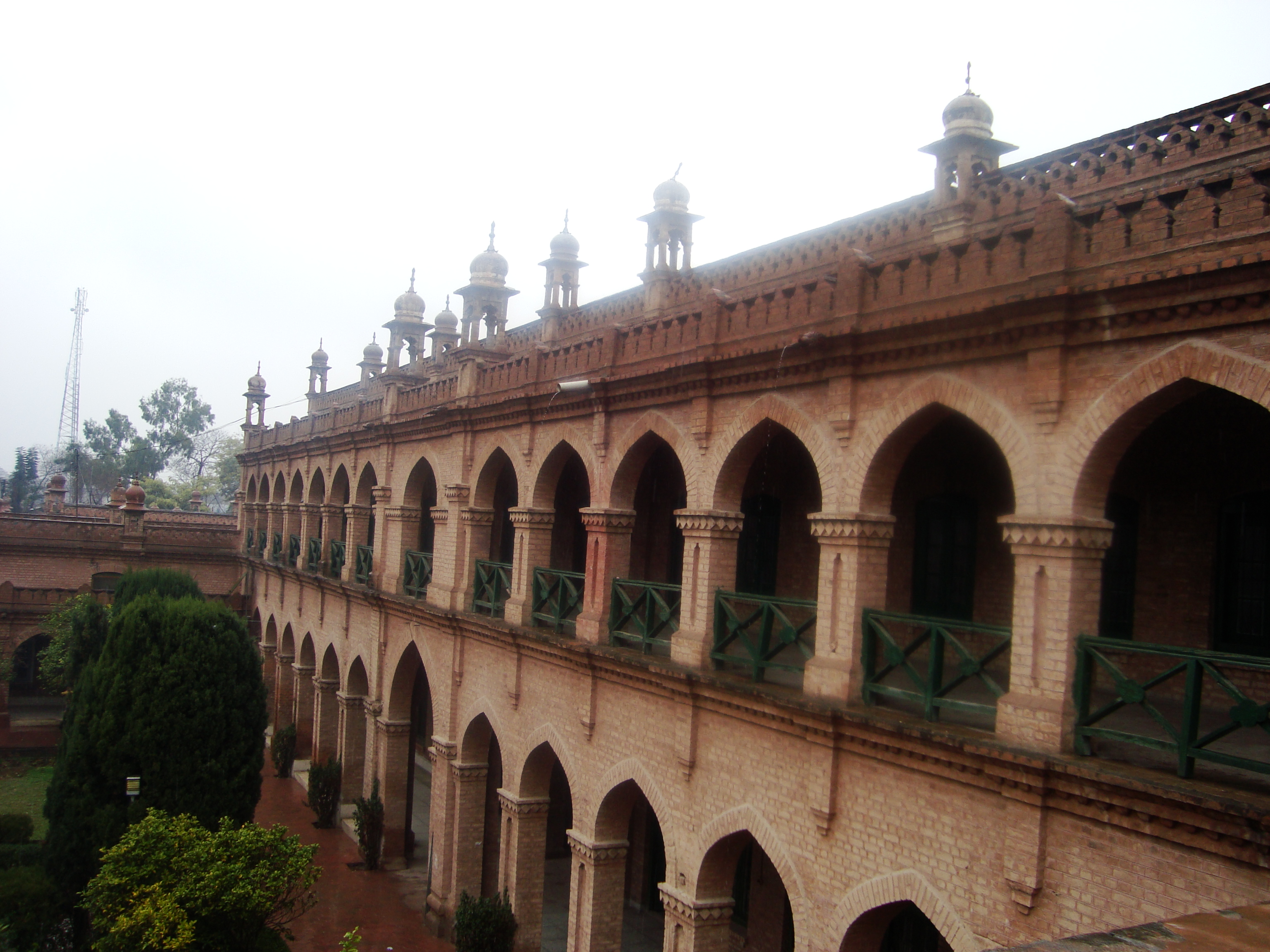
Mathematics Department

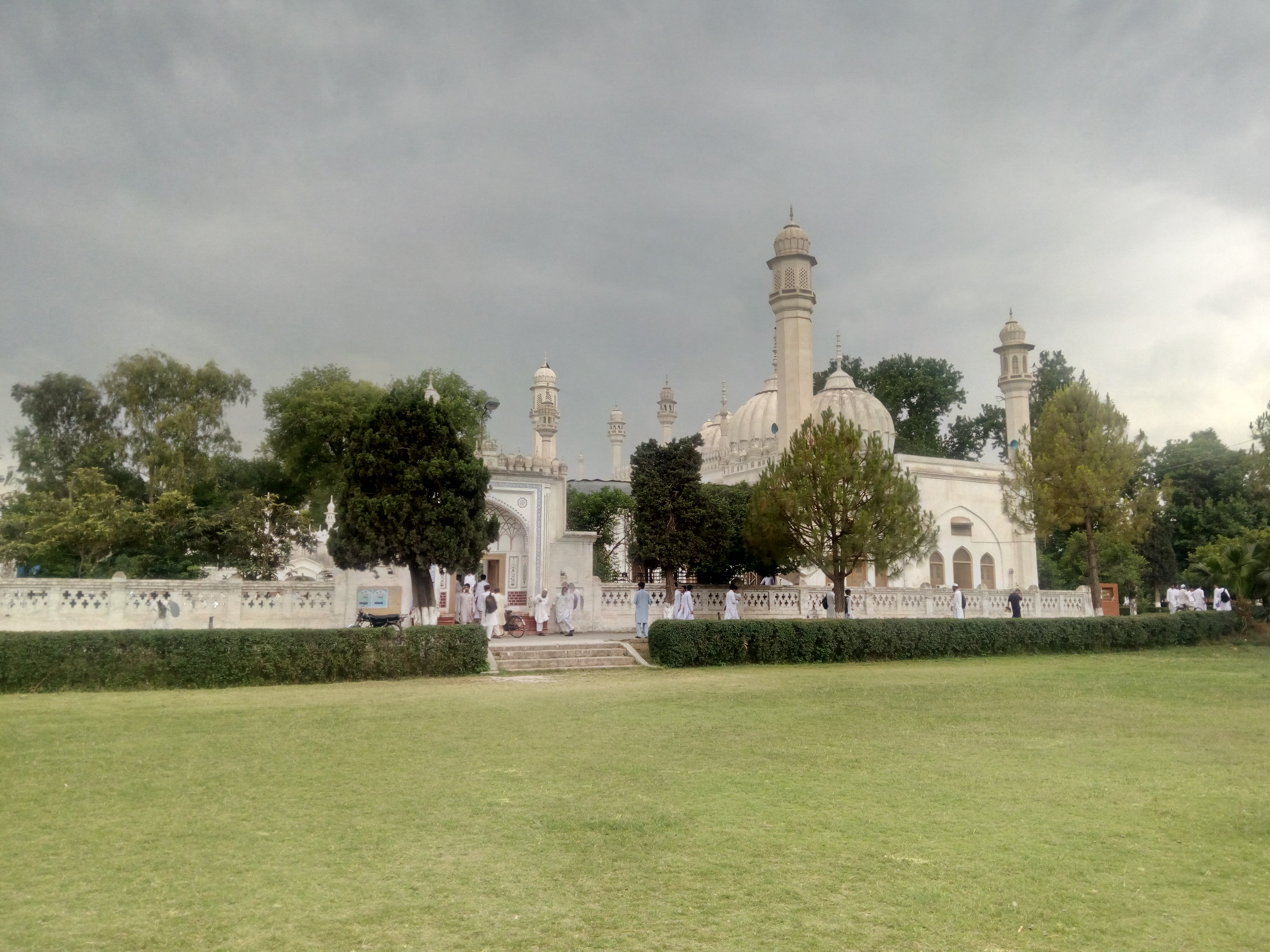
Islamia College Masjid

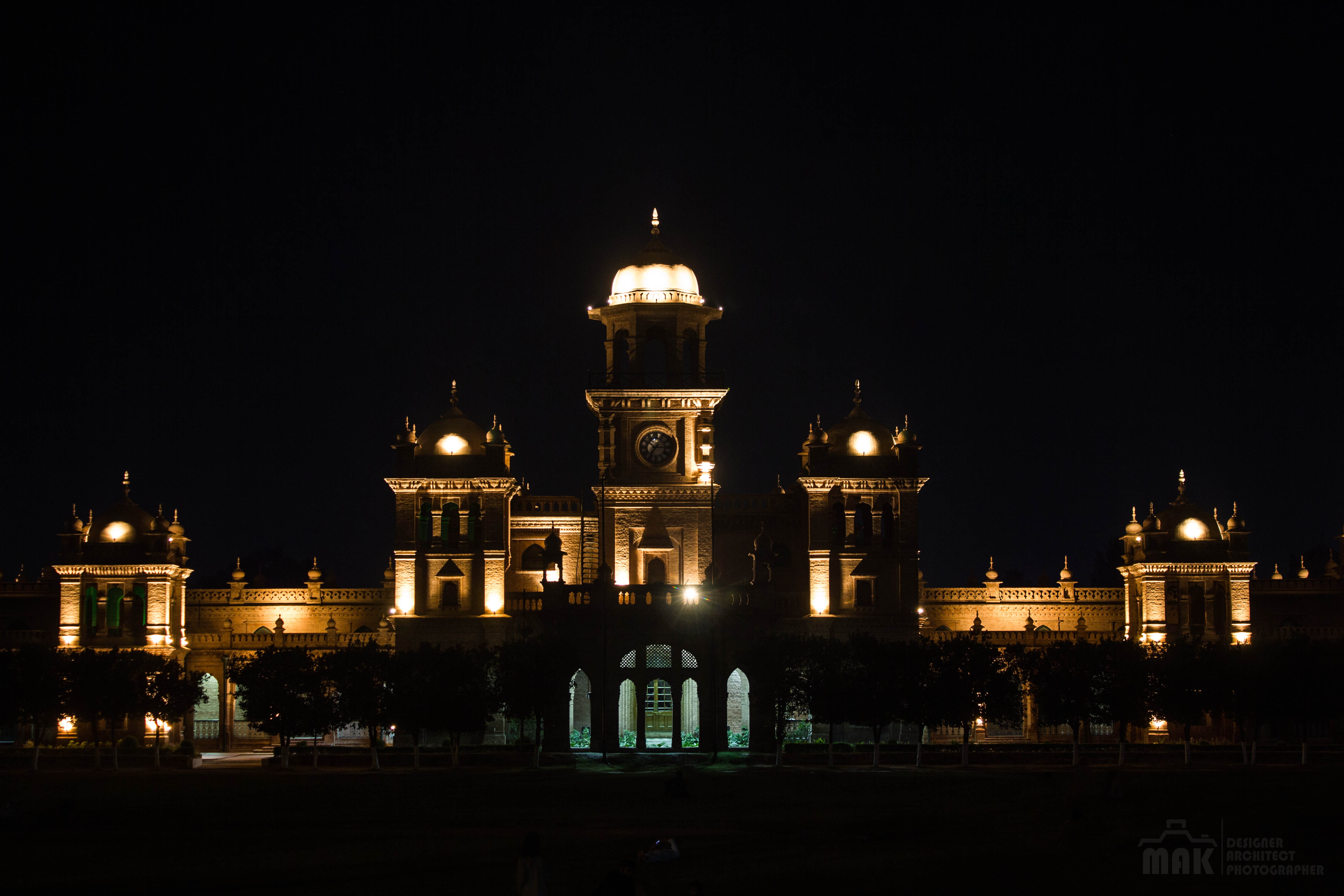
Islamia College at Night View

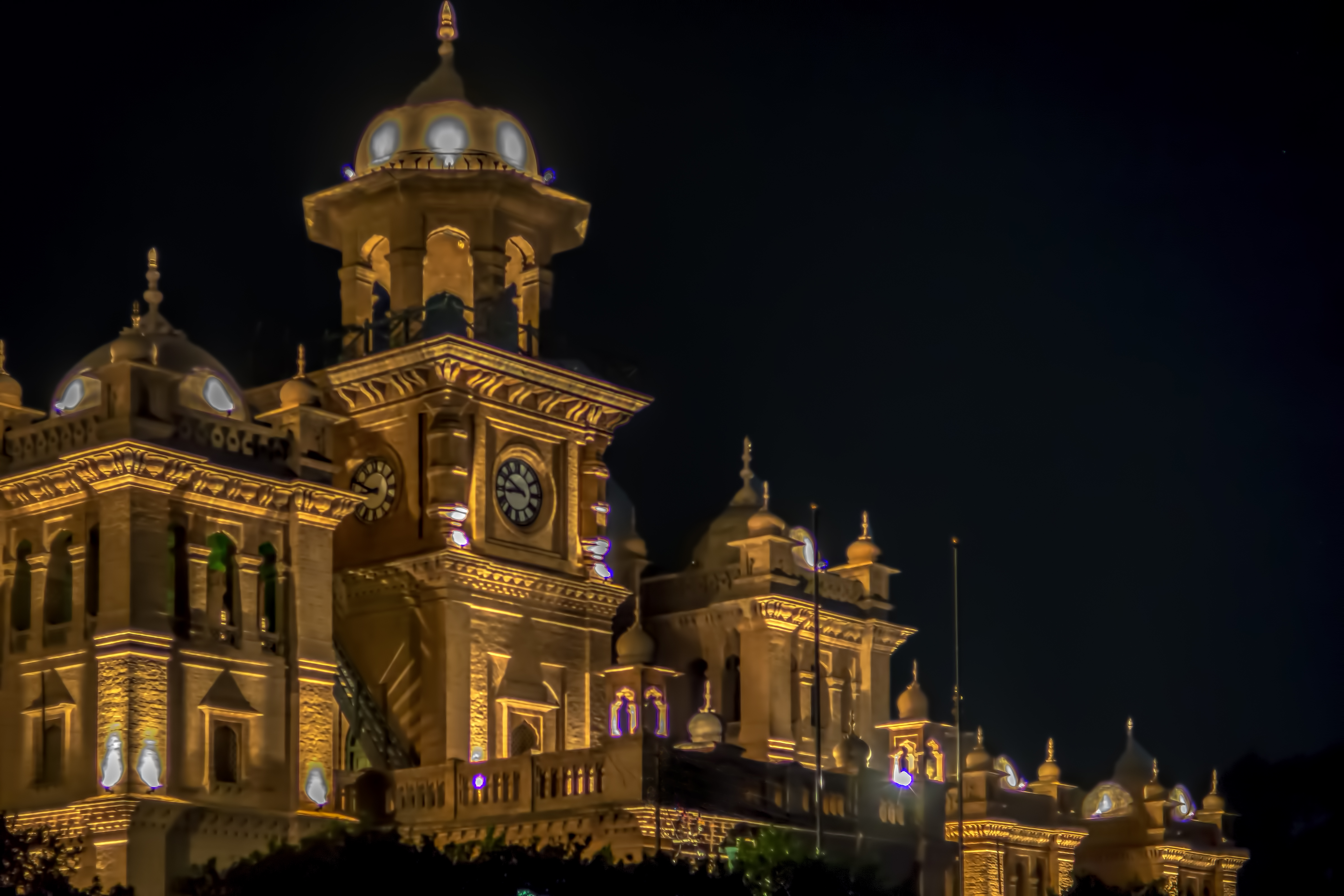
Islamia College Peshawar Night View

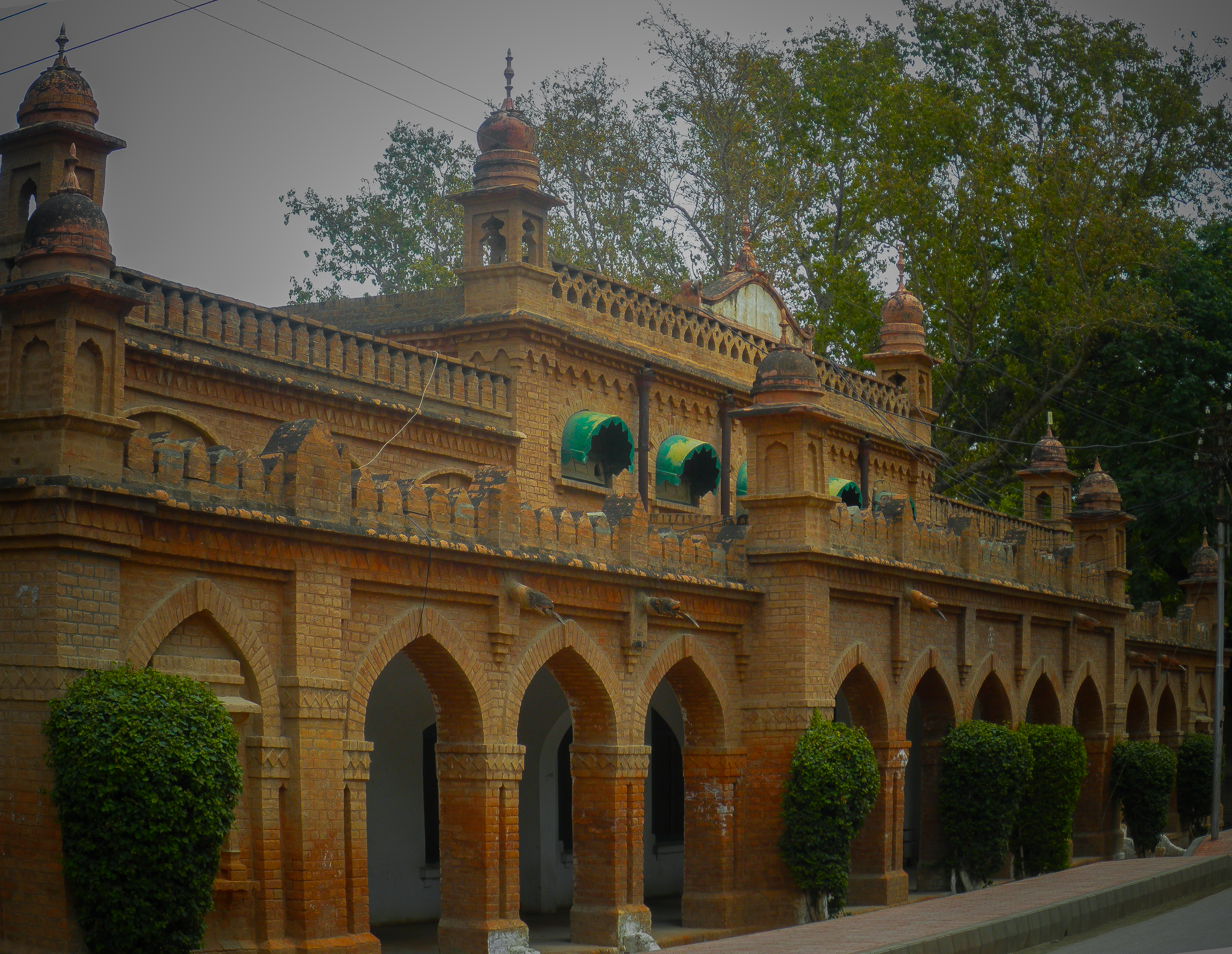
Central Library of Islamia College

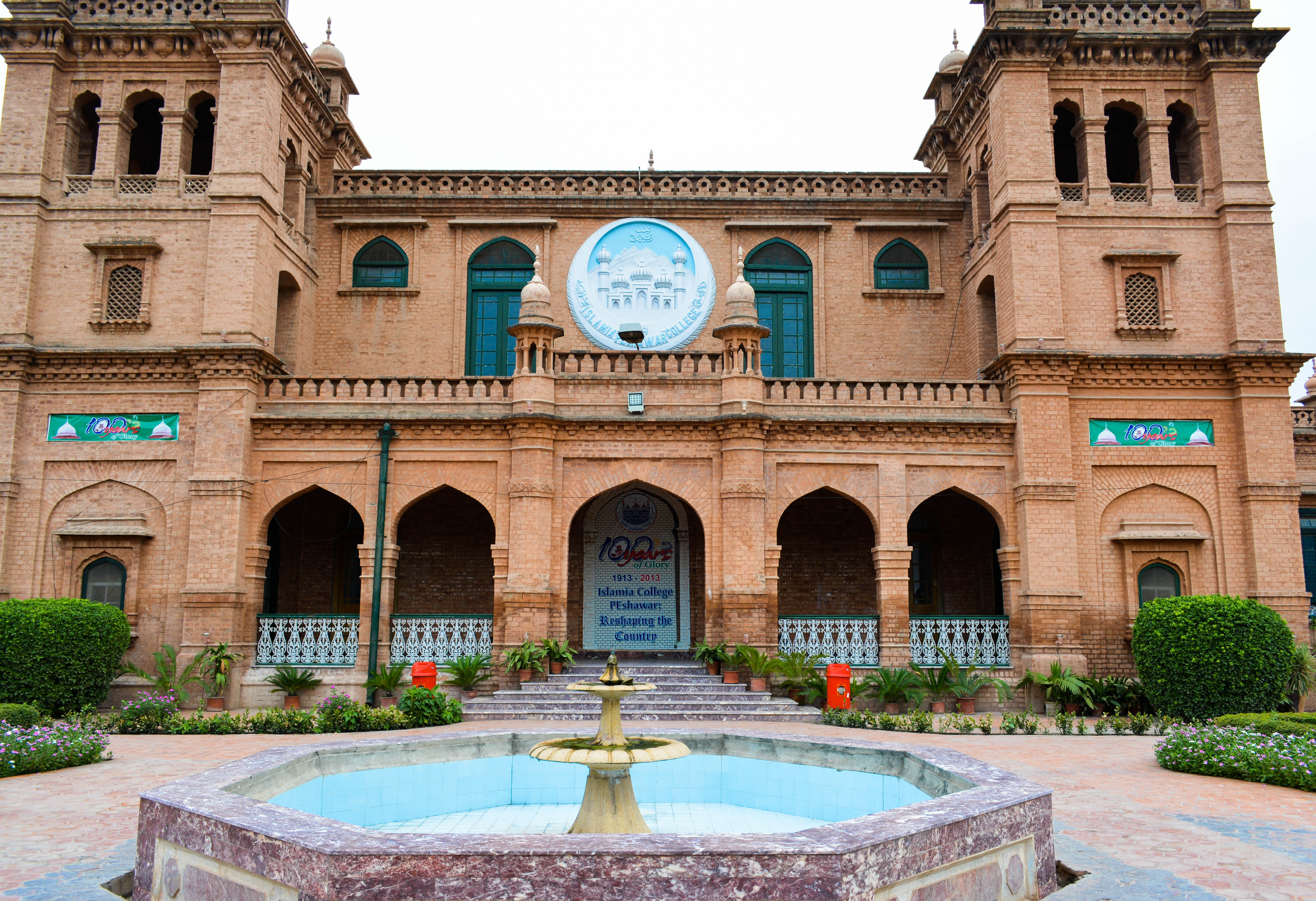
ICP University Fountai

== See also ==
- List of universities in Pakistan
- Education in Pakistan
- Army Burn Hall College
- Khyber Medical College
- University of Peshawar
