= Edwardes College Peshawar =

Government college in Peshawar, Pakistan

- ایڈورڈز کالج پشاور
- Edwardes College Peshawar
- Other name: ECP
- Motto: Latin: Ad majorem Dei gloriam
- Motto in English: To the greater glory of God
- Established: 1900
- Founder: Church Mission Society
- Affiliations: Board of Intermediate and Secondary Education, Peshawar, University of Peshawar, Edexcel, UK and EDSML
- Principal: Shujat Ali
- Academic staff: 109
- Students: 3000
- Location: Peshawar, Khyber Pakhtunkhwa, 25000, Pakistan; 34°00′23″N 71°33′05″E
- Campus: Urban
Colors
- Website: www.edwardes.edu.pk

Edwardes College Peshawar (Urdu: ایڈورڈز کالج پشاور, Pashto: اېډوارډز کالج پېښور) is a semi-government degree college and the oldest higher education institution in Peshawar, the capital of Khyber Pakhtunkhwa province in Pakistan. The college, affiliated with the University of Peshawar, has about 3,000 students in Sciences, Arts and Humanities, Business Administration, Higher National Diploma, and Computer Sciences.

The college's undergraduate and graduate degree programs lead to the Bachelor of Arts (B.A.), Bachelor of Science (B.Sc.), 4 year BS Programme in English and Computer Science, Master of Business Administration (M.B.A.) and 5 years LLB degrees awarded through the University of Peshawar Edwardes also offers an A-Level program and the Faculty of Arts (F.A.) and Faculty of Science (F.Sc.) certificates through the Board of Intermediate and Secondary Education of Khyber Pakhtunkhwa. The Higher National Diploma (H.N.D.) BS English program in business and information technology offers the option of a third year in an institution in the U.K., U.S.A. or Australia.

Originally a co-educational college, it became a boys-only college in the 1930s. Edwardes became co-educational again since 2000 with about 200 female students and 15 women among its faculty members, with the number of women anticipated to increase. The college has a vital community life, which includes freedom of worship for all faiths, sporting events, a debating society, drama productions, and student publications. Up to 1974 the institution was run by as organisation affiliated with the Church Mission Society. However, following Nationalisation Reforms of 1974 it was handed over to the Board of Governors headed by NWFP Governor. A ruling of the Peshawar High Court dated 14 November 2019 dismissed the plea of the Principal challenging the nationalisation of the college.

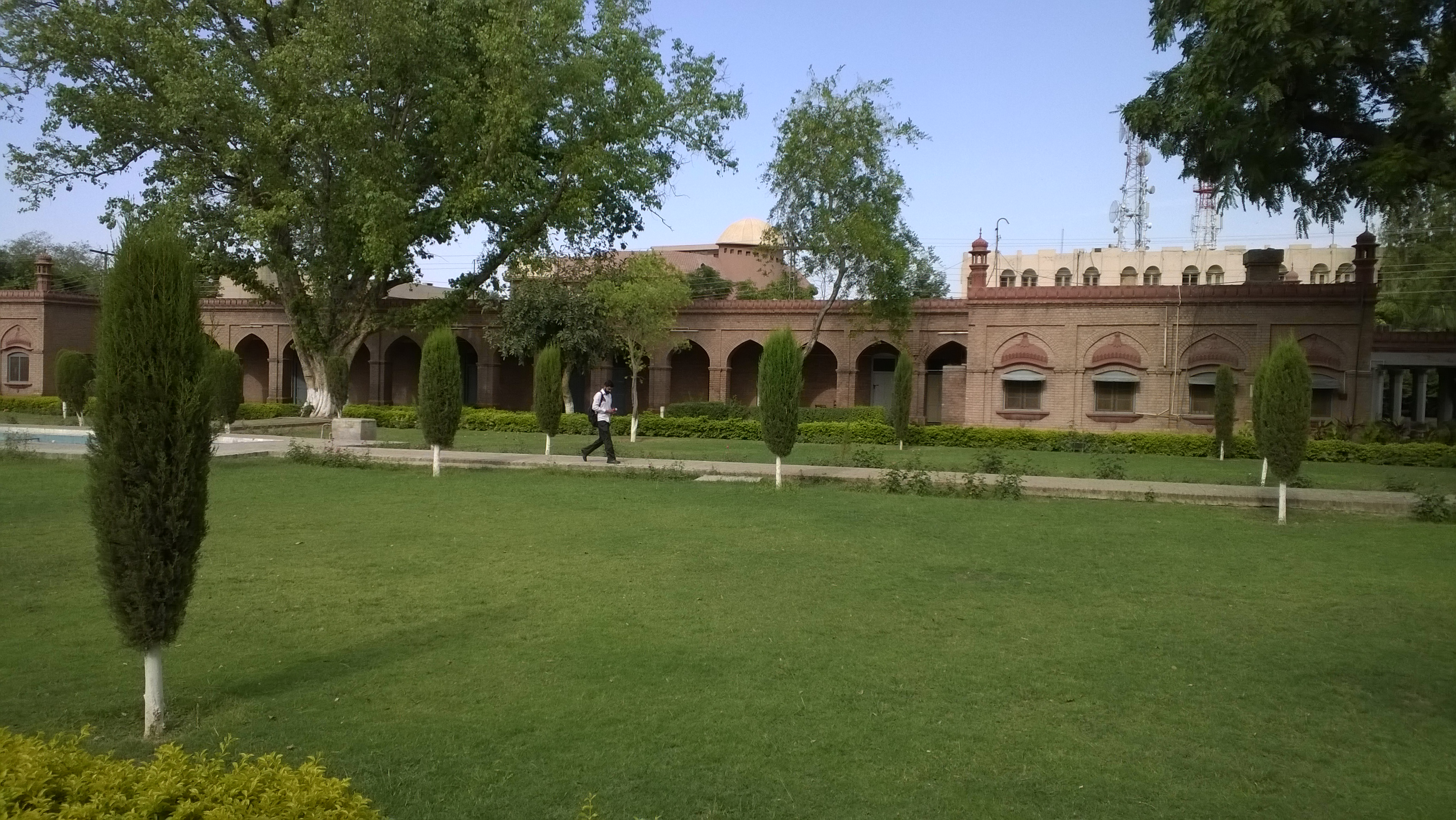
Edwardes College Lawn

== History ==
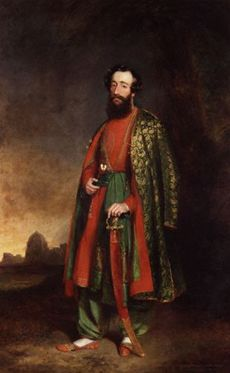
Sir Herbert Benjamin Edwardes after whom the college was named.

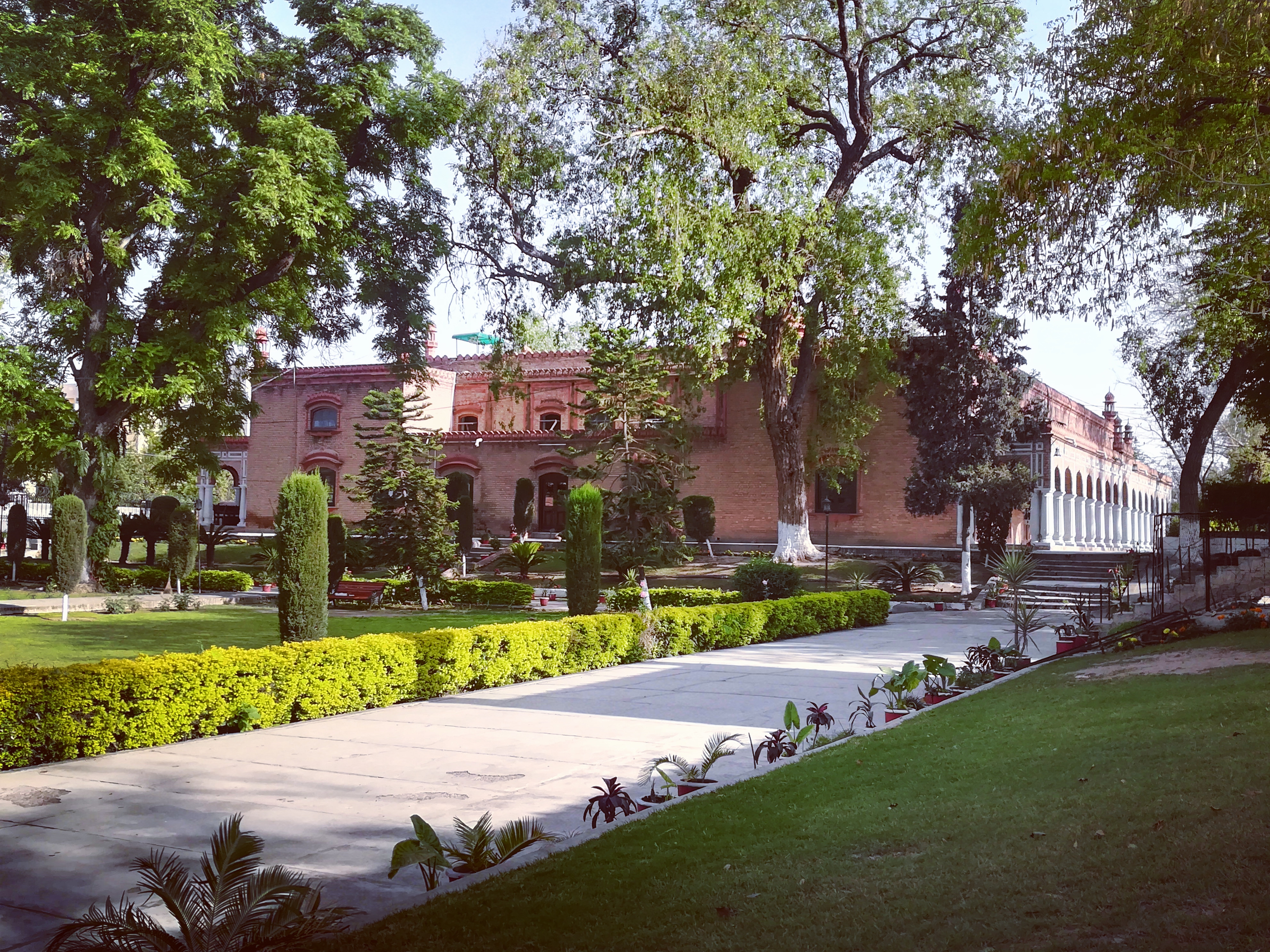
Edwardes College, Peshawar

The Church Missionary Society established the Church Mission College in 1900 as an outgrowth of Edwardes High School, which had been founded in 1855 by the society as the first institution of western-style schooling in the northwest frontier region of what was British India. For many years the college was the only institution of higher education in the northwest frontier. Sir Herbert Edwardes was a British colonial administrator and commander whose name the college later adopted.

The first major college building, now known as the Old Hall, was built in 1910 in a Moghul style that was replicated in a number of the college's later buildings. Edwardes College was visited three times by the founder of the nation, Quaid-i-Azam Muhammad Ali Jinnah, by Mahatma Gandhi, and the previous Archbishop of Canterbury, Rowan Williams. In its early years Edwardes awarded degrees through the University of Punjab; since 1952 its degrees have been awarded through the University of Peshawar.

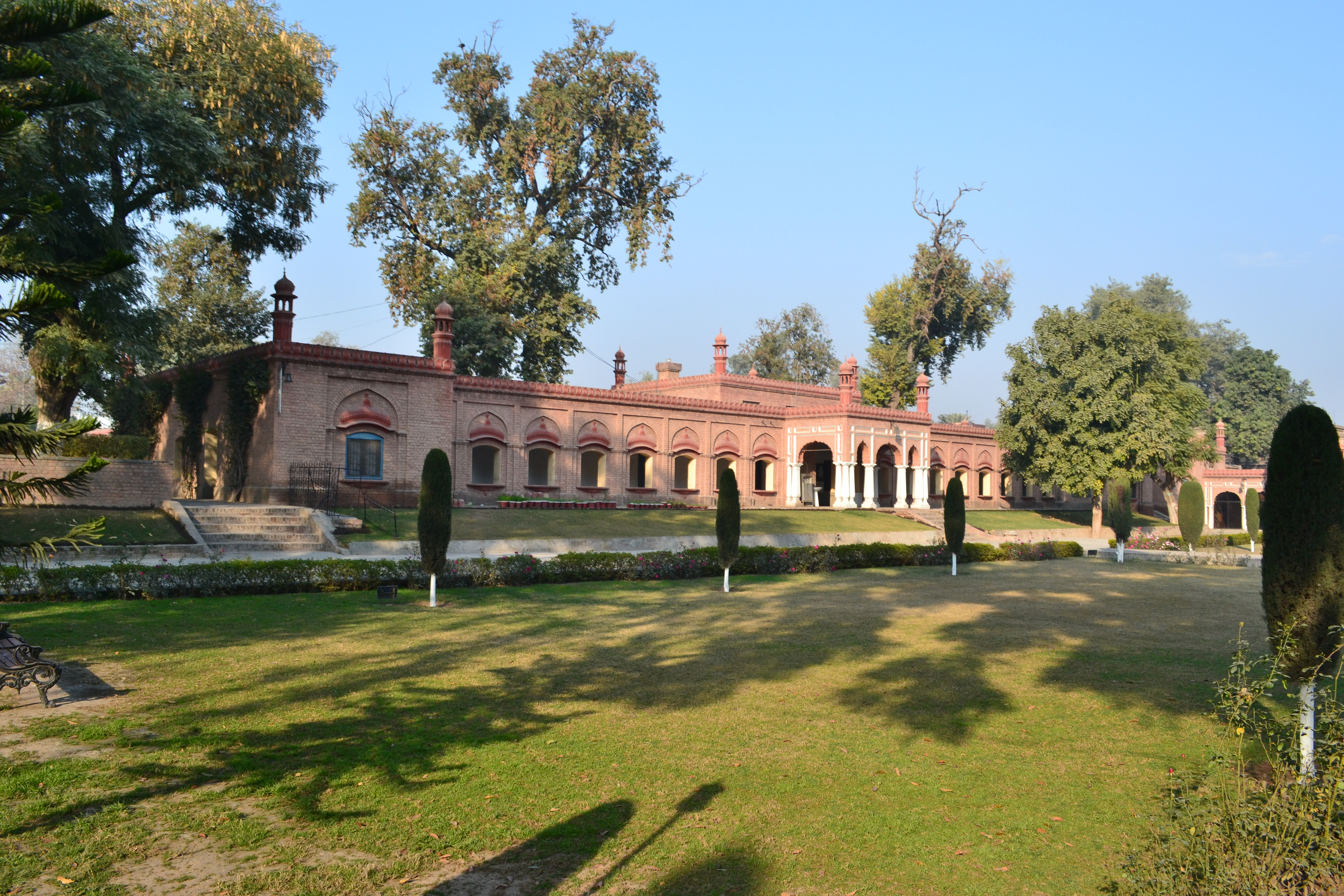

== Hostel ==
Edwardes has hostel accommodation for about 200 male students.

The main hostel is composed of four halls;

1. Edmonds Hall (1st Year Students)

2. Woolmer Hall (2nd Year Students)

3. B-Block Hall (2nd Year Students)

4. Founder's Hall (Degree Students)

Centenary Celebrations Postal stamp of Edwardes College by Pakistan Post, 24 April 2000

== Principals ==
- Rev. J. H. Hoare (1900–14)
- Rev. J. A. Wood (1914–20)
- Rev. A. C. Clarke (1920–21)
- Rev. P. W. Stephenson (1921–24)
- Rev. R. H. Noble (1924–28 and 1948–51)
- Rev. C. A. Bender (1928–37)
- Rev. A. M. Dalaya (1937–48)
- Rev. K. W. S. Jardine (1953–54)
- Canon W. F. Hawkes (1952–53 and 1954–55)
- Dr. P. Edmonds (1955–78)
- Dr. J. D. Murray (1978–79)
- Rev. N. Green (1980–82)
- Dr. T. Woolmer (1983–87)
- Dr. R. H. Pont (1988–95)
- R. Brooke Smith (1995-2000)
- Canon Huw Thomas (2001–05)
- Dr. David L. Gosling (2006–10)
- Rev. Canon Dr. Titus Presler (2011–13)
- P. Dr. Nayer Fardows (2014–19)
- Shujat Ali Khan (2019–Current)

== Key Programs ==
=== Intermediate Courses ===
- Pre-Medical
- Pre-Engineering
- General Science
- Humanities

=== 4 Years Degree Programs ===
- BS Computer Science
- BS English
- BS Economics
- BBA (Hons)
- BS Law (Five years)

=== Prospective Courses ===
- BS Biotechnology
- BS Chemistry
- BS Physics
- BS Political Science
- BS in other Social and Pure Sciences

=== Professional and Management Studies ===
- Higher National Diploma (HND)
- Diploma in Strategic Management
- Master of Business Administration (MBA)

=== A-Level Courses ===
- Pre-Medical
- Pre-Engineering
- Arts

=== Special Courses ===
- Community Service Program
- English Immersion Program

=== Language Classes Offered At HOARE CENTER OF MODERN LANGUAGES ===
- German
- Pashto
- Chinese
- French
- Spanish
- Arabic
- Persian

== Connections ==
Cambridge University, UK

Liverpool Hope University, UK

PASCH-Goethe Institute FDR, Germany

Colleges and Universities of Anglican Communion (CUAC)

== Awards ==
- Governor KPK's Award
- Need Based Award
- Free Education Award
- Annual Awards
- Duke of Edinburgh's Award

== Notable alumni ==
- Mehr Chand Khanna, a lawyer, well known politician and Finance Minister of NWFP from 1937–46
- Khalilur Rehman, ex-Commander of Pakistan Navy and Bahrain Navy a, Hilal-e-Imtiaz (military), served as the Governor of Khyber-Pakhtunkhwa, appointed in 2005
- Shafaat Ali, actor, comedian, television host
- Fasi Zaka, satirist, political commentator
- Humayun Saifullah Khan, politician
- Shahram Khan, Senior Minister Health & Information Technology Khyber Khyber Pakhtunkhwa Pakistan
- Ahmad Faraz, Urdu poet
- Ameer Haider Khan Hoti, former Chief Minister of Khyber Pakhtunkhwa
- Prithviraj Kapoor, Indian film and theatre actor/director/producer
- Dr. Khan Sahib (Dr. Abdul Jabbar Khan), first chief minister of West Pakistan
- Aftab Ahmad Sherpao, politician and former chief minister, North-West Frontier Province
- Fida Mohammad Khan, founder of the Pakistan Muslim League (N) and former governor, North-West Frontier Province
- Muhammad Suhail Zubairy, professor of physics at the Texas A&M University
- Sardar Abdur Rab Nishtar, former governor of Punjab
- Khan Habibullah Khan, (1901–1978), Justice (retired), first Chairman of the Senate of Pakistan; former Interior Minister and Minister for Kashmir Affairs
- Salim Saifullah Khan, senator, politician
- Haji Muhammad Adeel, senator, politician
- Ghulam Ahmad Bilour, politician, member National Assembly, former Minister of Railways
- Taj Khan Kalash, Pakistani ethnic minority activist
- Abbas Khattak, former chief of Air Staff, Pakistan Air Force
- General (R) Abdul Waheed Kakar, former chief of Army Staff
- Muhammad Rustam Kayani, (known As M. R. Kayani), former chief justice of West Pakistan 1958 to 1962
- Haseeb Ahsan, former test cricketer and chief selector Pakistan Cricket Board.
- Farrukh Zaman, former test cricketer
- Tariq Saeed Mufti, surgeon and medical academic
- Musaddiq Hussain, Olympian, former international hockey player
- Kabir Khan, former test cricketer
- Yasir Hameed, international cricketer
- Javed Afridi, CEO of Haier Pakistan and Peshawar Zalmi
- General (R) Khalid Mahmud Arif, vice chief of Army Staff
- Safwat Ghayur Shaheed, A.I.G.P.
- Hakimullah, retired air chief marshal, P.A.F. 1988–1991
- Owais Ahmed Ghani, former governor of KPK and Baluchistan
- Justice (R) Nasirul Mulk, 22nd Chief Justice of Pakistan and the 7th Caretaker Prime Minister of Pakistan

== See also ==
- List of universities in Pakistan
- Education in Pakistan
- University of Peshawar
