= History of Peshawar =

The history of Peshawar is intertwined with the history of the broader Indian subcontinent. The region was known as Puruṣapura in Sanskrit, literally meaning "city of men". (Note: From Sanskrit puruṣa, "(primordial) man", and pura, "city".) Being among the most ancient cities of the Indian subcontinent, Peshawar had for centuries been a center of trade between West Asia, Central Asia, and the Indian subcontinent.

== Ancient history ==
In recorded history, the earliest major city established in the general area of Peshawar was called Puruṣapura (Sanskrit for City of Men), from which the current name "Peshawar" is likely derived and was western capital of Gandhara, after Pushkalavati. Around 700 BCE, the region was governed by the independent Gandhāra Kingdom, which was recognised as a Mahajanapada or "Great Realm". By the 2nd century BCE, Peshawar was an ancient center of learning, as witnessed by the Bakhshali Manuscript, which used the Bakhshali approximation and was found nearby.

The region was annexed by the Persian Achaemenid Empire. Later, the city was invaded by Alexander the Great's army. The city passed into the rule of Alexander's successor, Seleucus I Nicator who ceded it to Chandragupta Maurya, the founder of the Maurya Empire. The fall of the Mauryans provided opportunity to the Indo-Greeks to establish their rule over the region. The Indo-Greek kings combined the Greek and Indian languages and symbols, as seen on their coins, and blended ancient Greek, Hindu and Buddhist religious practices, as seen in the archaeological remains of their cities and in the indications of their support of Buddhism, pointing to a rich fusion of Indian and Hellenistic influences.

The diffusion of Indo-Greek culture had consequences which are still felt today, particularly through the influence of Greco-Buddhist art. The Indo-Greeks ultimately disappeared at Peshawar as a political entity around 10 CE following the conquests of the Indo-Scythians, although pockets of Greek populations presumably remained under the subsequent rule of the Indo-Parthians and Kushans.

The city was then conquered by the Kushan Empire. The Kushan Emperor Kanishka, who ruled from 127 CE, moved the capital from Pushkalavati (present-day Charsadda district, in the Peshawar Valley) to Gandhara (Peshawar city) in the 2nd century CE. Buddhist missionaries arrived at Vedic, and animist Peshawar, seeking counsel with the Kushan rulers. Their teachings were embraced by the Kushans, who converted to Buddhism, assigning the religion with great status in the city. Following this move by the Kushans, Peshawar became a center of Buddhist learning.

The giant Kanishka stupa at Peshawar, which may have been the tallest building in the world at the time, was built by King Kanishka to house Buddhist relics just outside the present-day Ganj Gate of the old city of Peshawar. The Kanishka stupa was said to be an imposing structure, as one traveled down from the Hindu Kush mountains onto the Gandharan plains. The earliest account of the famous building was documented by Faxian, the Chinese Buddhist pilgrim, who was also a monk, who visited the structure in 400 AD and described it as being over 40 chang in height (approximately 120 metres (390 ft)) and adorned "with all precious substances". Faxian continued: "Of all the stûpas and temples seen by the travelers, none can compare with this for beauty of form and strength." The stupa was eventually destroyed by lightning, but was repaired several times; it was still in existence at the time of Xuanzang's visit in 634 AD. A jeweled casket containing relics of the Gautama Buddha, and an inscription identifying Kanishka as the donor, existed at the ruined base of this giant stupa — the casket was excavated, by a team supervised by Dr D.B. Spooner in 1909, from a chamber under the very centre of the stupa's base.

== Medieval history ==
The Buddhist, Hindu, and Zoroastrian Pashtuns began converting to Islam following the early annexation by the Arab Empire from Khurasan (in what is Afghanistan, Turkmenistan and northeastern Iran). The Kabul Shahis ruled the Kabul Valley and Gandhara (modern-day Pakistan and Afghanistan) from the decline of the Kushan Empire in the 3rd century to the early 9th century CE. The Shahis are generally split up into two eras: the Buddhist Shahis and the Hindu Shahis, with the change-over thought to have occurred sometime around 870 CE. The kingdom was known as the Kabul Shahan or Ratbelshahan from 565 CE to 670 CE, when the capitals were located in Kapisa and Kabul, and later Udabhandapura, also known as Hund, for its new capital.

The Hindu Shahis under Jayapala, is known for his struggles in defending his kingdom against the Ghaznavids in the modern-day eastern Afghanistan and Pakistan region. Jayapala saw a danger in the consolidation of the Ghaznavids and invaded their capital city of Ghazni both in the reign of Sebuktigin and in that of his son Mahmud, which initiated the Muslim Ghaznavid and Hindu Shahi struggles. Sebuk Tigin, however, defeated him, and he was forced to pay an indemnity. Jayapala defaulted on the payment and took to the battlefield once more. Jayapala, however, lost control of the entire region between the Kabul Valley and Indus River.

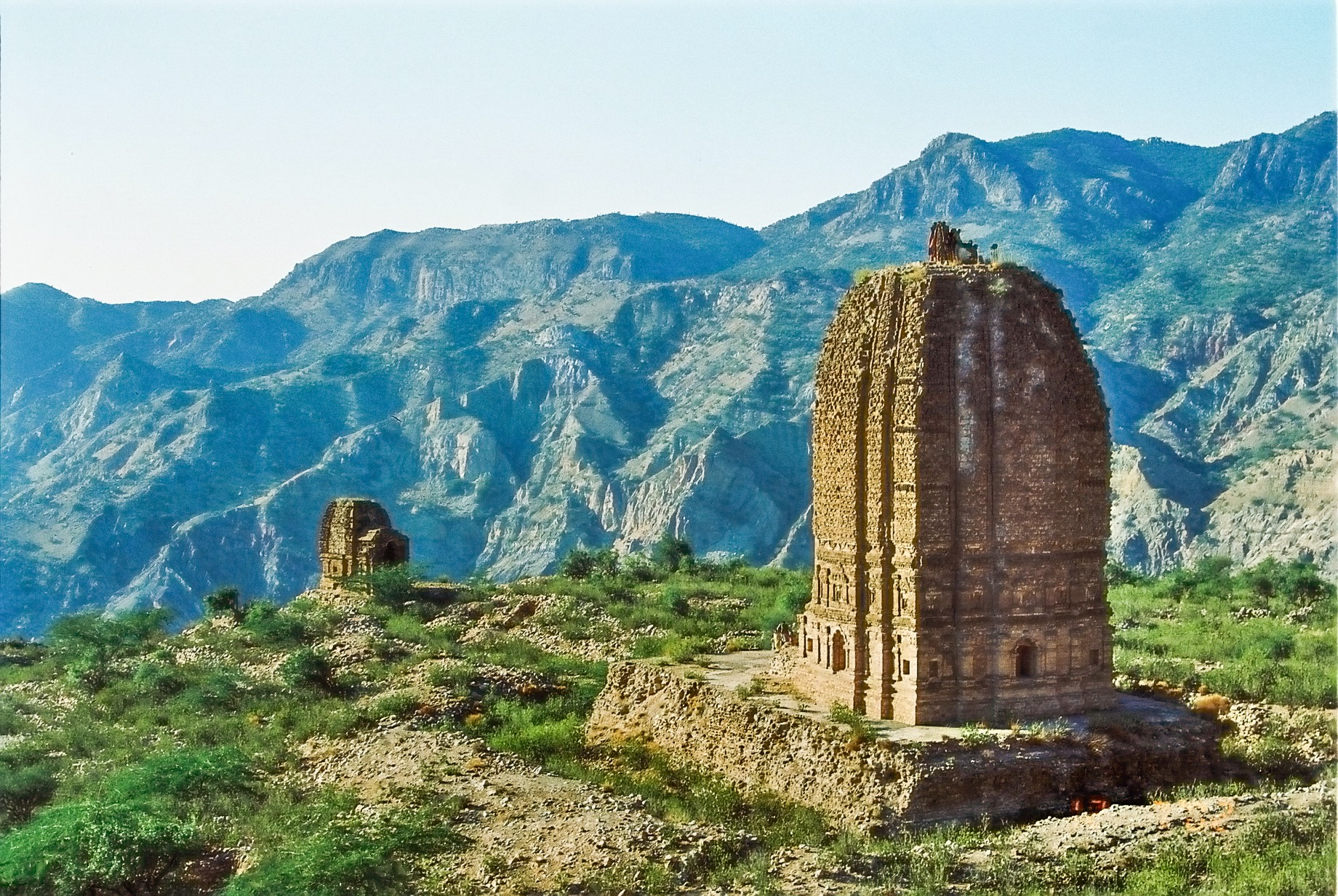
The Amb Hindu Temple complex was built between the 7th and 9th centuries CE during the reign of the Hindu Shahi Empire.

Before Jayapala's struggle began, he had raised a large army of Punjabi Hindus. When Jayapala went to the Punjab region, his army was raised to 100,000 horsemen and an innumerable host of foot soldiers. According to Ferishta:

The two armies having met on the confines of Lumghan, Subooktugeen ascended a hill to view the forces of Jayapala, which appeared in extent like the boundless ocean, and in number like the ants or the locusts of the wilderness. But Subooktugeen considered himself as a wolf about to attack a flock of sheep: calling, therefore, his chiefs together, he encouraged them to glory, and issued to each his commands. His soldiers, though few in number, were divided into squadrons of five hundred men each, which were directed to attack successively, one particular point of the Hindoo line, so that it might continually have to encounter fresh troops.

However, the army was hopeless in battle against the western forces, particularly against the young Mahmud of Ghazni. In the year 1001, soon after Sultan Mahmud came to power and was occupied with the Qarakhanids north of the Hindu Kush, Jayapala attacked Ghazni once more and upon suffering yet another defeat by the powerful Ghaznavid forces, near present-day Peshawar. After the Battle of Peshawar, he committed suicide because his subjects thought he had brought disaster and disgrace to the Shahis.

Jayapala was succeeded by his son Anandapala, who along with other succeeding generations of the Shahis took part in various unsuccessful campaigns against the advancing Ghaznavids but were unsuccessful. The Hindu rulers and vast Hindu population eventually exiled themselves to the Kashmir Siwalik Hills.

== Early modern history ==
=== Pashtun and Mughal rule (1451–1758) ===
Peshawar was a northwestern regional center of the Pashtun Lodi Empire which was founded by Bahlul Lodi in 1451 and centered at Delhi. Peshawar was also incorporated into the Mughal domains by the mid of 16th century. The founder of the Mughul dynasty that would conquer South Asia, Babur, who hailed from the area that is currently Uzbekistan, arrived in Peshawar and founded a city called Bagram, where he rebuilt a fort in 1530 AD.

The Pashtun emperor Sher Shah Suri, who founded the Sur Empire centered at Delhi, turned Peshawar's renaissance into a boom when he ran his Delhi-to-Kabul Shahi Road as a northwestern extension of the Grand Trunk Road through the Khyber Pass and Peshawar in the 16th century. Later Babur's grandson, Akbar the Great, recorded the name of the city as Peshawa, meaning "The Place at the Frontier" or "Near Water" and expanded the bazaars and fortifications. The Muslim technocrats, bureaucrats, soldiers, traders, scientists, architects, teachers, theologians and Sufis flocked from the rest of the Muslim world to the Islamic Sultanate in South Asia, with many settling in the Peshawar region.

=== Maratha Peshawar (1758–1759) ===
The Marathas defeated the Durranis in the Battle of Peshawar in 1758 as a part of Northwest campaign after being invited by Adina Beg, the governor of Punjab. When Raghunathrao, Malhar Rao Holkar and Sikh alliance of Charat Singh and Jassa Singh Ahluwalia left Peshawar, Tukoji Rao Holkar was appointed as the commander of the region. Tukoji along with Khandoji Kadam defeated the Afghan garrison.

=== Durrani Peshawar (1759–1818) ===
As Mughal power declined in 1747, following a loya jirga, Peshawar would join the Pashtun Durrani Empire of Ahmad Shah Durrani. Peshawar was attacked and captured by the Maratha Empire of western India, which conquered Peshawar on 8 May 1758. A large force of Pashtuns under Ahmad Shah Durrani then re-conquered Peshawar in early 1759. Peshawar remained under Durrani rule till the conquest by the Sikhs in 1818.

In 1776, Ahmad Shah's son, Timur Shah Durrani, chose Peshawar as his winter capital and the Bala Hissar Fort in Peshawar was used as the residence of Durrani kings. Pashtuns from Peshawar participated in the incursions of South Asia during the Durrani Empire. Peshawar remained the winter capital until the Sikhs of the Punjab region rose to power in the early nineteenth century.

=== Sikh conquest (1818–1849) ===
Until 1818, Peshawar was controlled by Afghanistan, but was invaded by the Sikh Empire of Punjab. The arrival of a party led by British explorer and former agent of the East India Company, William Moorcroft was seen as an advantage, both in dealings with Kabul and for protection against the Sikhs of Lahore. Moorcroft continued to Kabul in the company of Peshawari horses and thence to the Hindu Kush. In 1818, Peshawar was captured by Maharaja Ranjit Singh and paid a nominal tribute until it was finally annexed in 1834 by the Sikhs, after which the city fell into steep decline. Many of Peshawar's famous Mosques and gardens were destroyed by the Sikhs at this time. An Italian was appointed by the Sikhs as administrator. Acting on behalf of the Sikhs, Paolo Avitabile, unleashed a reign of fear – his time in Peshawar is known as a time of "gallows and gibbets." The city's famous Mahabat Khan, built in 1630 in the Jeweler's Bazaar, was badly damaged and desecrated by the Sikh conquerors.

The Gurdwara Bhai Joga Singh and Gurdwara Bhai Beeba Singh were constructed in the city by Hari Singh Nalwa to accommodate the influx of Sikh immigrants from the Punjab. While the city's Sikh population drastically declined after the partition of India, Peshawar's Sikh community has re-established itself, bolstered by Sikh refugees and by approximately 4,000 refugees from the Tribal Areas; in 2008, the largest Sikh population in Pakistan was located in Peshawar. Sikhs in Peshawar self-identify as Pashtuns and speak Hindko and Pashto as their mother tongues.

=== Afghan attempts to reconquer Peshawar ===
In 1835, an attempt to re-occupy the city by an Afghan Emir Dost Mohammad Khan, failed to conquer the fort from Sikh Empire. Even in 1837, the Afghans couldn't conquer the fort of Jamrud, nor were they able to gain possession of Peshawar. This was the last and final failed attempt of the Afghans to gain possession of Peshawar, following which they retreated back to Jalalabad. Following this, Peshawar was annexed by the British East India Company after the death of Maharaja Ranjit Singh in the Second Anglo-Sikh War of 1849.

== Colonial history (1849–1947) ==
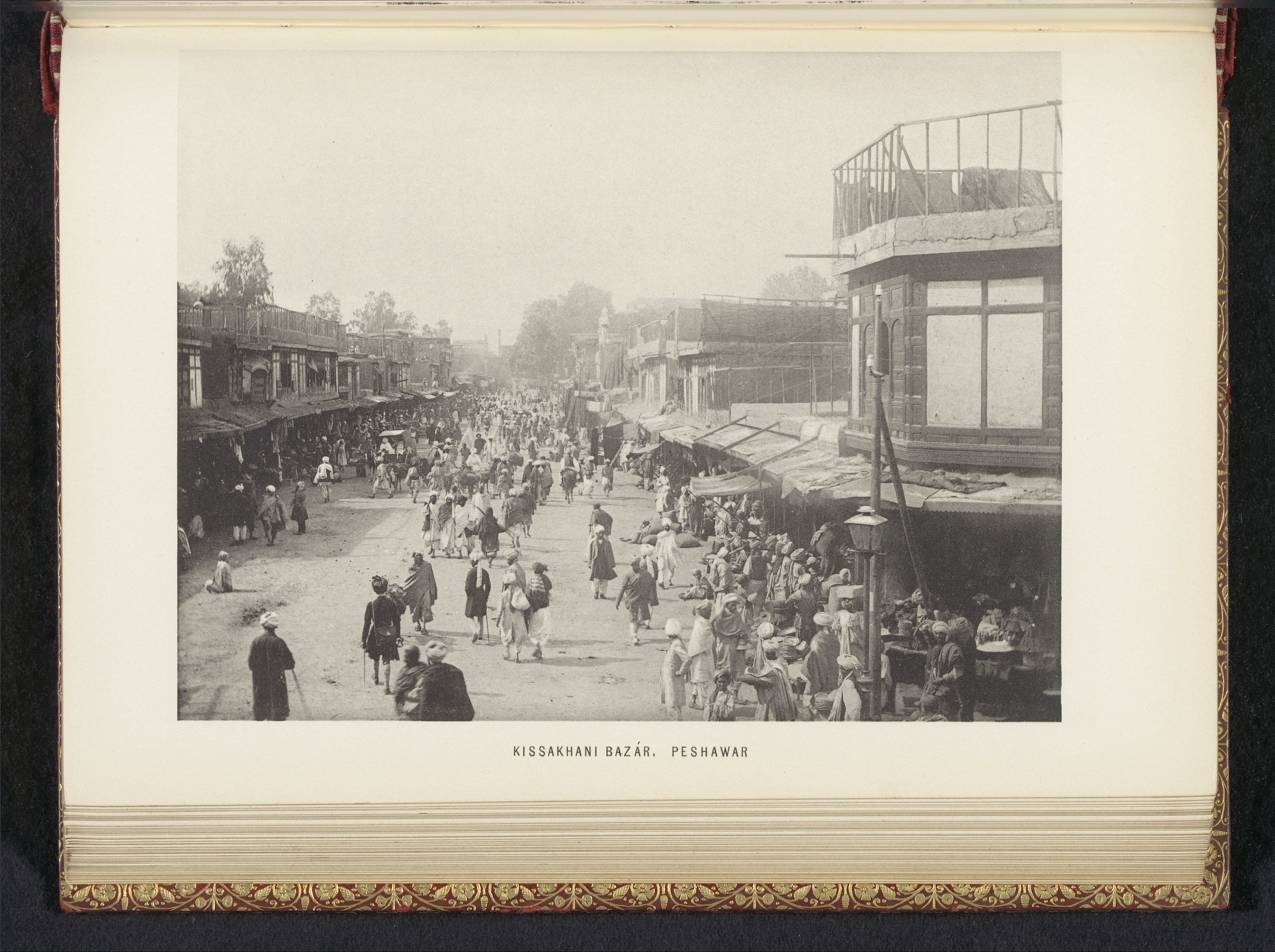
Qissa Khwani Bazaar, Peshawar, circa 1890–1895.

Following the defeat of the Sikh's in the Second Anglo-Sikh War in 1849, territories in the Punjab were also captured by British East India company. During the Sepoy Rebellion of 1857, the 40,000 members of the native garrison were disarmed without bloodshed; the absence of brutality meant that Peshawar was not affected by the widespread devastation that was experienced throughout the rest of British India and local chieftains sided with the British after the incident. British control remained confined within the city walls as vast regions of the Frontier province outside the city were claimed by the Kingdom of Afghanistan. The vast mountainous areas outside of the city were mapped out only in 1893 by Sir Mortimer Durand, foreign secretary of the British Indian government, who collaboratively demarcated the boundary of British-controlled areas with the Afghan ruler at the time, Abdur Rahman Khan.

The British laid out the vast Peshawar Cantonment to the west of the city in 1868, and made the city its frontier headquarters. Additionally, several projects were initiated in Peshawar, including linkage of the city by railway to the rest of British India and renovation of the Mohabbat Khan mosque that had been desecrated by the Sikhs. The British also constructed Cunningham clock tower, in celebration of the Golden Jubilee of Queen Victoria, and, in 1906, constructed Victoria Hall (now home of the Peshawar Museum) in memory of Queen Victoria. The British greatly contributed to the establishment of Western-style education in Peshawar with the establishment of Edwardes College and Islamia College in 1901 and 1913, respectively—these were established in addition to numerous other schools, many of which are run by the Anglican Church. For better administration of the region, Peshawar and the adjoining districts were separated from the Punjab Province in 1901.

Communal riots broke out in the old city of Peshawar during the spring of 1910, when the annual Hindu festival of Holi coincided with Barawafat, the annual Muslim day of mourning, resulting in a considerable loss of life along with hundreds of looted businesses and injuries. (Note: "The date of the Hindu festival of Holi coincided with Barawafat, the Musalman day of mourning, in 1910, which led to a very serious riot between the Hindus and Musalmans of the Peshawar City resulting in a considerable loss of life. There was a wholescale plunder of Hindu houses and shops.") A month prior, in February 1910, prominent community religious leaders met with officials and agreed that Holi would be solely celebrated in predominantly Hindu neighbourhoods of the city, notably in Andar Shehr and Karim Pura. (Note: "On 22nd February 1910, a meeting of leading Muslims and Hindu leaders was called by deputy commissioner of Peshawar at the Municipal Hall in which arrangements regarding the upcoming festivals were discussed and a committee was established consisting of prominent leaders from both sides. It was decided in the meeting that the Holi should be celebrated quietly until the 25th March. There should be only two processions, namely from the Hindu quarter of Andar Shahr to that of Karimpura and vice-versa. The Muslim of the city should not join the procession and the troops should celebrate Holi in their lines and some leading men from both sides will supervise the arrangement at Hasting Memorial and other at Clock Tower.") On March 21, 1910, however, rumors of musicians from Amritsar and a dancing boy from Haripur being brought into the city for Holi celebrations, led to a group of individuals who were marking Barawafat into forming a mob with the intention of stopping the procession. (Note: On 21st March the Deputy Commissioner was informed by deputy superintendent of police Zain ul Abidin that the situation in the city is not good as Hindu brought some musicians from Amritsar and a dancing boy from Hari Pur and they are intending to lead the procession on an unauthorized route. The superintendent of police suggested the deputy commissioner that the Holi should not be allowed as the situations going to create clash. Mr. Blackway sent some Hindu leader to enquire the situation. These Hindu gentlemen assured the deputy commissioner that the situation is friendly and nothing bad is going to be happened. There is no musician with the Holi and it would follow the old route. At the same time some Muslim leaders reported to the deputy commissioner about the Muslim mob who intended to stop the Holi procession. They also suggested that Holi procession should be stopped to avoid an expected clash between the two communities. However, after the surety of the Hindu leaders that there are no musicians and dancing boys and that the procession is not going on an unauthorized route the deputy commissioner was stuck to follow his old plan. This was the point which was misunderstood and created communal violence in the city.) Despite Muslim and Hindu community leaders calling for calm, both parties ultimately clashed at the Asamai Gate, when the Holi procession was en route to Dargah Pir Ratan Nath Jee, with a Hindu procession member stabbing a Muslim individual in the mob. (Note: Around 8 pm when the Holi procession at Asa Mai gate was about to depart on the route to Pir Rathan Nath Dharamshala sub inspector Kanhya Lal who was posted at Chita Khuo informed the police head quarter that a mob of Muslim also assembled to stop it and the two mobs started abusing each other. Leaders from both sides tried to control the situation but the people from both sides refused to pay any heed to their leaders. Meanwhile, a Hindu Mahr Singh stabbed a Muslim with knife. Mahr Singh was chased by the mob and captured him at Bara Bazar. At the same time two Muslims Jani and Ahmad were killed by Hindu with knives. Police report for 21st March 1911, provides that two Muslim were killed and three wounded while from Hindu side two people were killed and eleven were wounded and eleven shops were broken.) Riots ensued for the following three days, involved individuals from outlying tribal regions who had entered the city, with a mob at Bara Bazar allegedly chanting “Maro Hindu Ko” (Kill the Hindus). (Note: When the funeral party was ousted from the city a riffraff of Muslim consisting of people from trans-border areas and Afghanistan remained in the city that started plundering and broke 285 shops. A violent clash was started in which two Hindus and one Muslim was killed... The next day on 23rd March the looting of shops started again. The first case was reported in Ramdas Bazar where the Muslim despite the Military and Police patrolling looted the Hindu shops. A Hindu, reader of Nawab of Landi fired and wounded two Muslim. The local Hindu during investigation denied the fact but Military intelligence reported that he fired and wounded two people. He was arrested and sent on trial under India Penal Code. Two Hindu were killed at Ram Das Bazar. It was also reported that in Mewa Mandi a mob of Afridi and Mohmand tribes started plundering and looted many shops. People from tribal areas were also involved in this looting. 11 shops were broken in Ram Das Bazar that day... The official records about the events of the day had self-contradictory statements. The starting paragraphs of police and commissioner reports claims that everything was good at the start of the day but after a while the situation was out of control in the whole city. For instance, police reports provides that around 10:00 am, in Karimpura a police constable Chettan Ram was struck on head and the mob at Bara Bazar started the slogan “Maro Hindu Ko”.) Estimates detail the riots resulted in a total of 451 damaged shops and homes, primarily belonging to members of the Hindu community, while at least 4 Muslims and 6 Hindus were killed, alongside hundreds of injuries.

Peshawar emerged as a centre for both Hindko and Pashtun intellectuals. Hindko speakers, also referred to as Khaarian ("city dwellers" in Pashto) or Hindkowans, were responsible for the dominant culture for most of the time that Peshawar was under British rule.

Peshawar was the scene of a non-violent resistance movement that was led by Ghaffar Khan, a disciple of Mohandas Gandhi. In April 1930, Khan led a large group of locals, in a peaceful protest in Qissa Khawani Bazaar, against discriminatory laws that had been enacted by the colonial government — hundreds were killed when a detachment of the British Indian Army opened fire on the demonstrators.

== Post-independence history ==
After the Soviet occupation of Afghanistan in 1979 Peshawar served as a political centre for anti-Soviet Mujahideen, and was surrounded by huge camps of Afghan refugees. Many of the refugees remained there through the civil war which broke out after the Soviets were defeated in 1989, the rule of the Taliban, and the invasion by allied forces in late 2001. Peshawar would replace Kabul and Qandahar as the centre of Afghan cultural development during this tumultuous period. Additionally, Peshawar managed to assimilate many of the Pakhtun Afghan refugees with relative ease, while many other Afghan refugees remained in camps awaiting a possible return to Afghanistan.

Peshawar continues to be a city that links Pakistan to Afghanistan and has emerged as an important regional city in Pakistan and remains a focal point for Pakhtun and Afghan culture.

== See also ==
- Timeline of Peshawar history
- Doaba Daudzai Tehsil
- History of Khyber Pakhtunkhwa
