= Gor Khatri =

Archaeological site in Peshawar, Pakistan

- گورکهتری (Hindko)
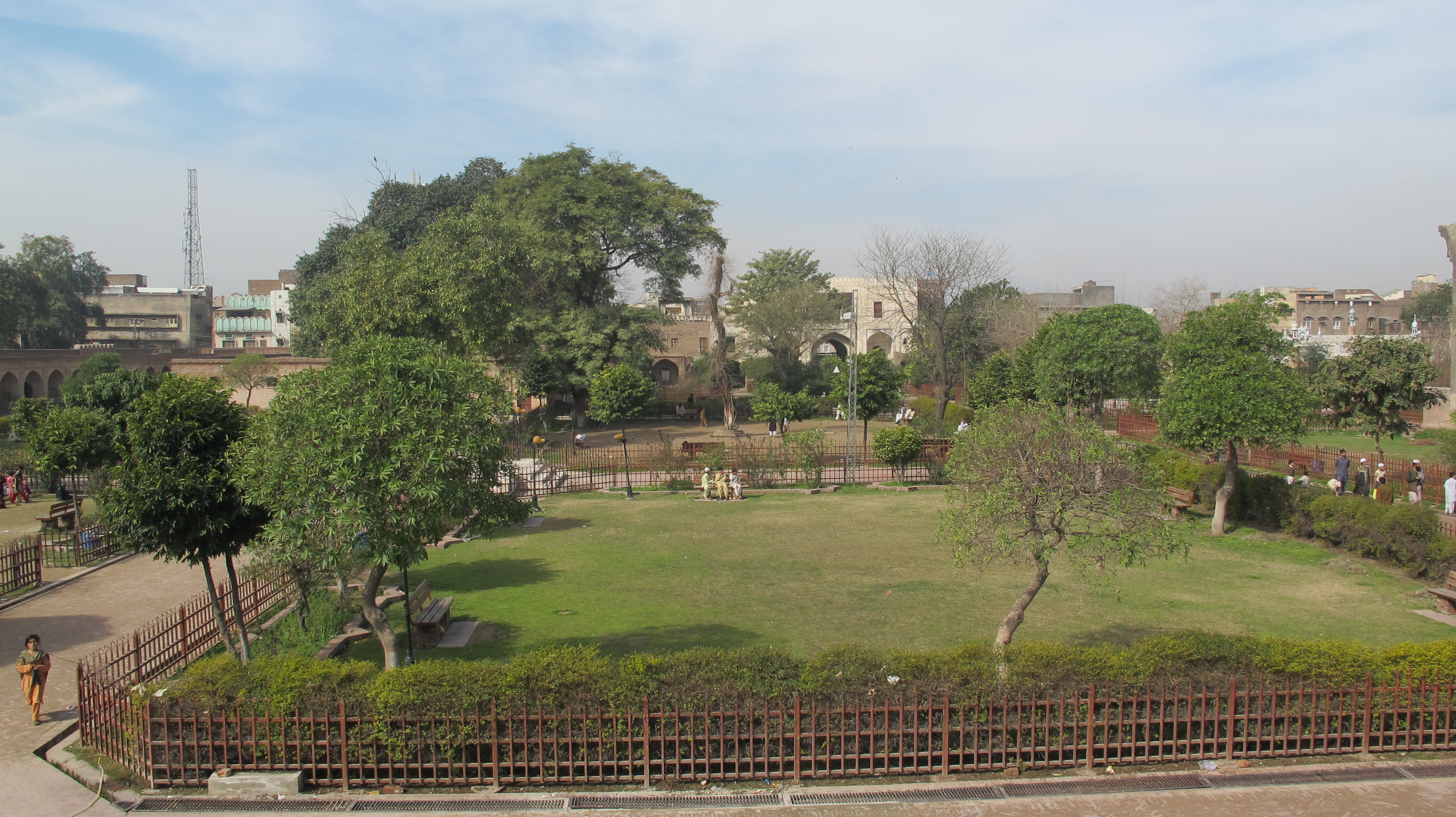
- A view over Gorkhatri
- Interactive map of Gor Khatri
- 34.0086403°N 71.5816924°E
- Location: Peshawar, Khyber Pakhtunkhwa, Pakistan

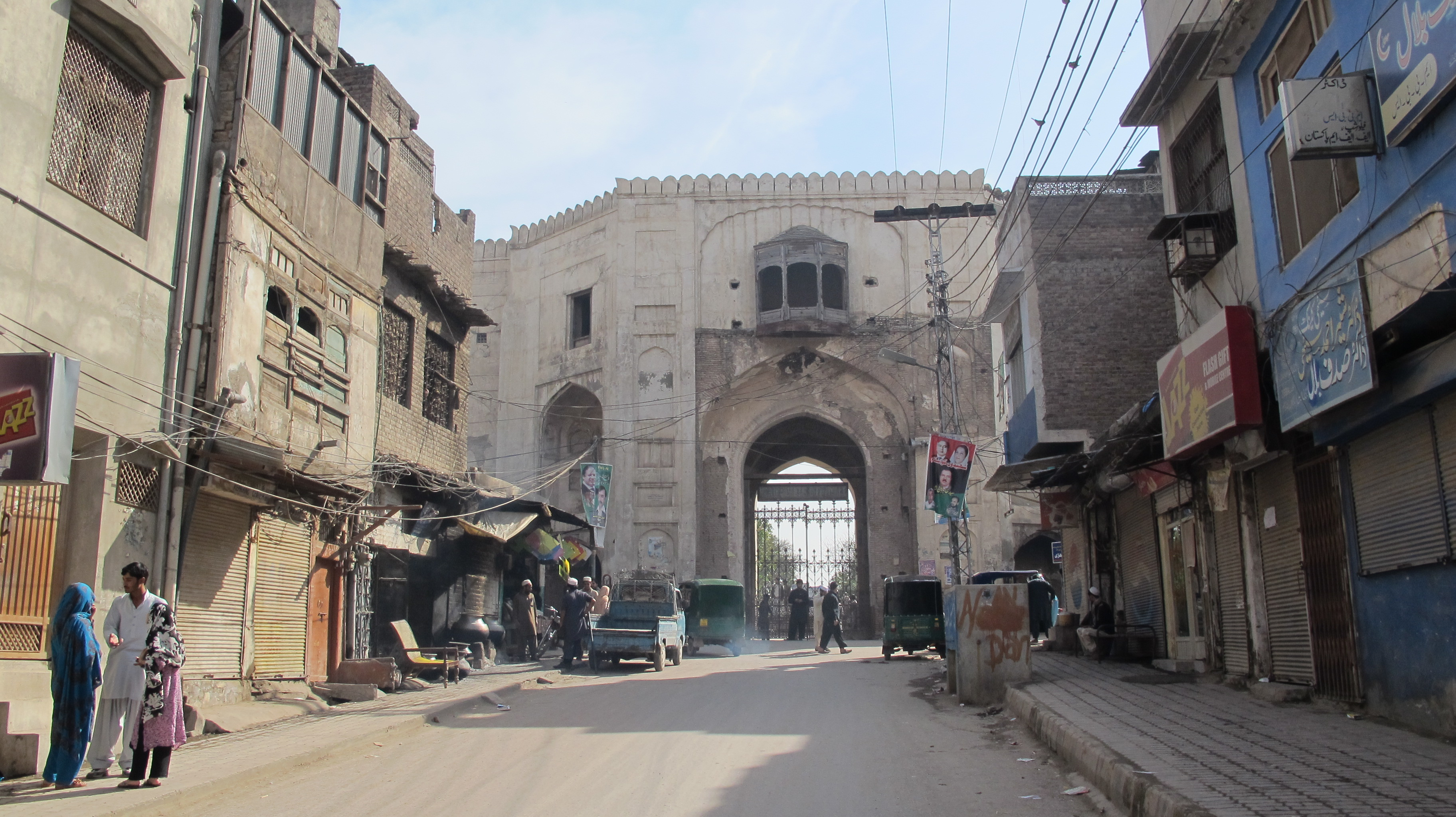
Gorkhatri's entryway as viewed from Peshawar's old city

Gor Khatri (Urdu and Hindko: گورکهتری; Pashto: ګورکترۍ; lit. 'Grave of Kshatriya') is an archeological site located in Peshawar, Pakistan. It was built in the Mughal-era by Jehan Ara Begum, daughter of Shah Jahan, as a caravanserai.

== History ==
Gor Khatri is an archaeological site in Peshawar which includes a square shaped compound that has been excavated and researched. In 1641, Jehan Ara Begum, daughter of Shah Jahan, built Gor Khatri as a caravanserai.

Alexander Cunningham identified Gor Khatri with where Kanishka stupa initially was. Pakistan archeologist Ahmad Hasan Dani further learned that it was also where the Buddha bowl tower once stood.

The celebrated Chinese pilgrim Xuanzang, who visited Gandhara in the early 7th Century CE, had paid glowing tribute to the city and the Kanishka stupa in his memoirs. He also talked about a site, which many historians argue refers to Gorkhatri where "Buddha's giant bowl was kept". Mughal Emperor Babar, who recorded its importance in his autobiography, visited the place in the Babur Nama

In the early 16th century, Jahanara Begum, daughter of Mughal Emperor Shah Jahan, built a pavilion at the ancient site, and converted the site into a caravanserai, and named it Sarai Jahanabad. She also constructed a Jama Masjid, a sauna bath and two wells inside Sarai Jahanabad for the convenience of travelers.

The Sikhs converted the site into the residence and official headquarters of their mercenary general Paolo Avitabile who was governor of Peshawar from 1838–1842. They constructed a Hindu temple for Shiva there. Prof. S.M. Jaffar, in his book "Peshawar: Past and Present", identified it with the place of Hindu pilgrimage where they performed the Sardukahr ritual (shaving off heads). Between the 1917 till 2002, Gor Khatri was used as a police headquarters and fire brigade station.

== Compound ==
Gor khatri is a 160x160 square meter compound located in the south-east side of Peshawar, Pakistan. It includes two prominent gateways, the Goraknath Temple at the center, and a network of cells and buildings in the southern and western side of the complex.

== Excavations ==
Dr. Farzand Ali Durrani initiated the first vertical excavations at Gor Guthrree in 1992-93 but his excavation work could not be completed due to lack of funds. However, he confirmed the city foundation went back to at least the 3rd Century BC.

The second round of excavations carried on until 2007 in the north eastern aspect of Gorkhatri pushed Peshawar's age by another couple of centuries, officially making it the oldest living city in South Asia.

== Gallery ==
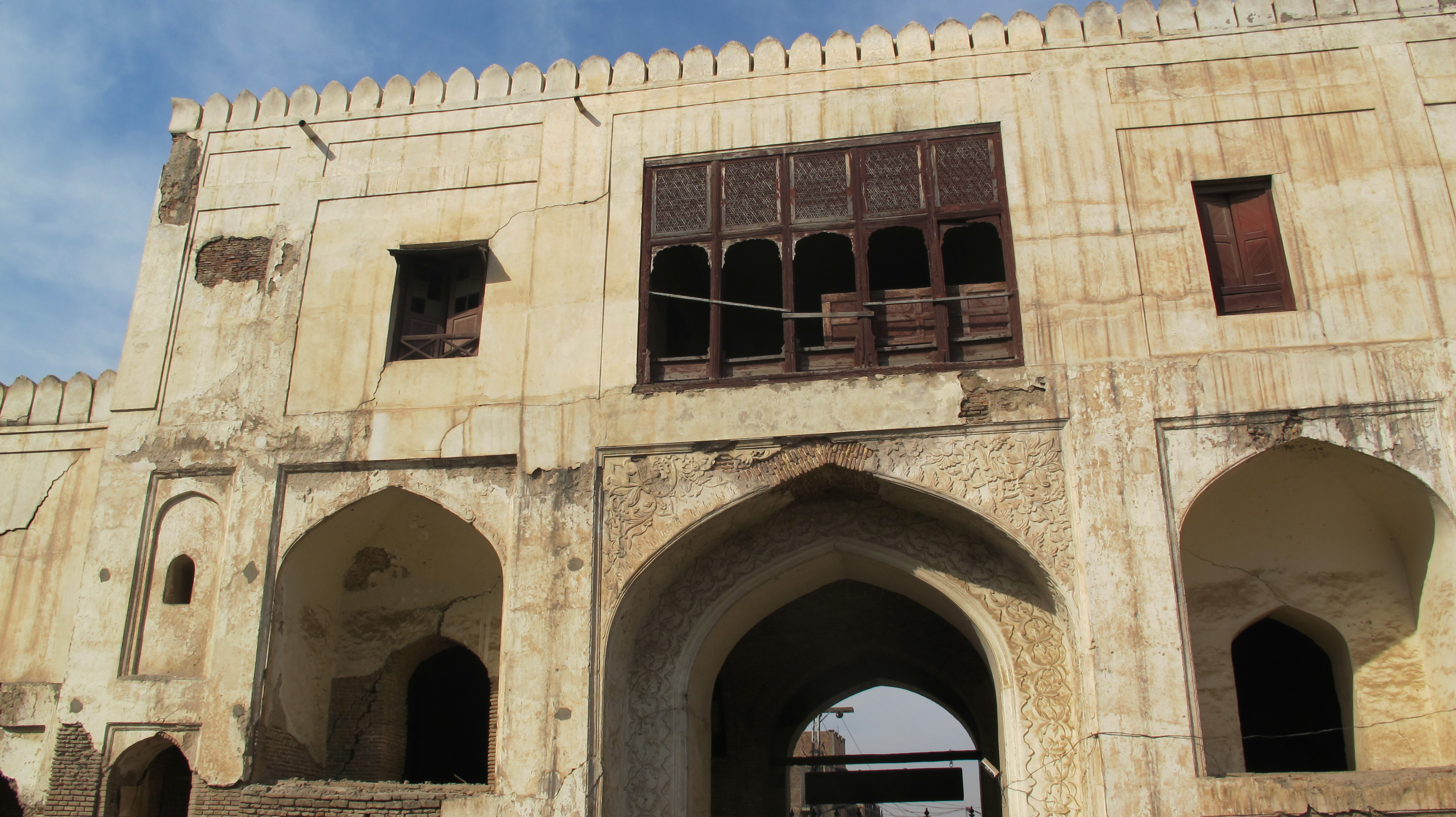
Entryway to the site as viewed from the site's park

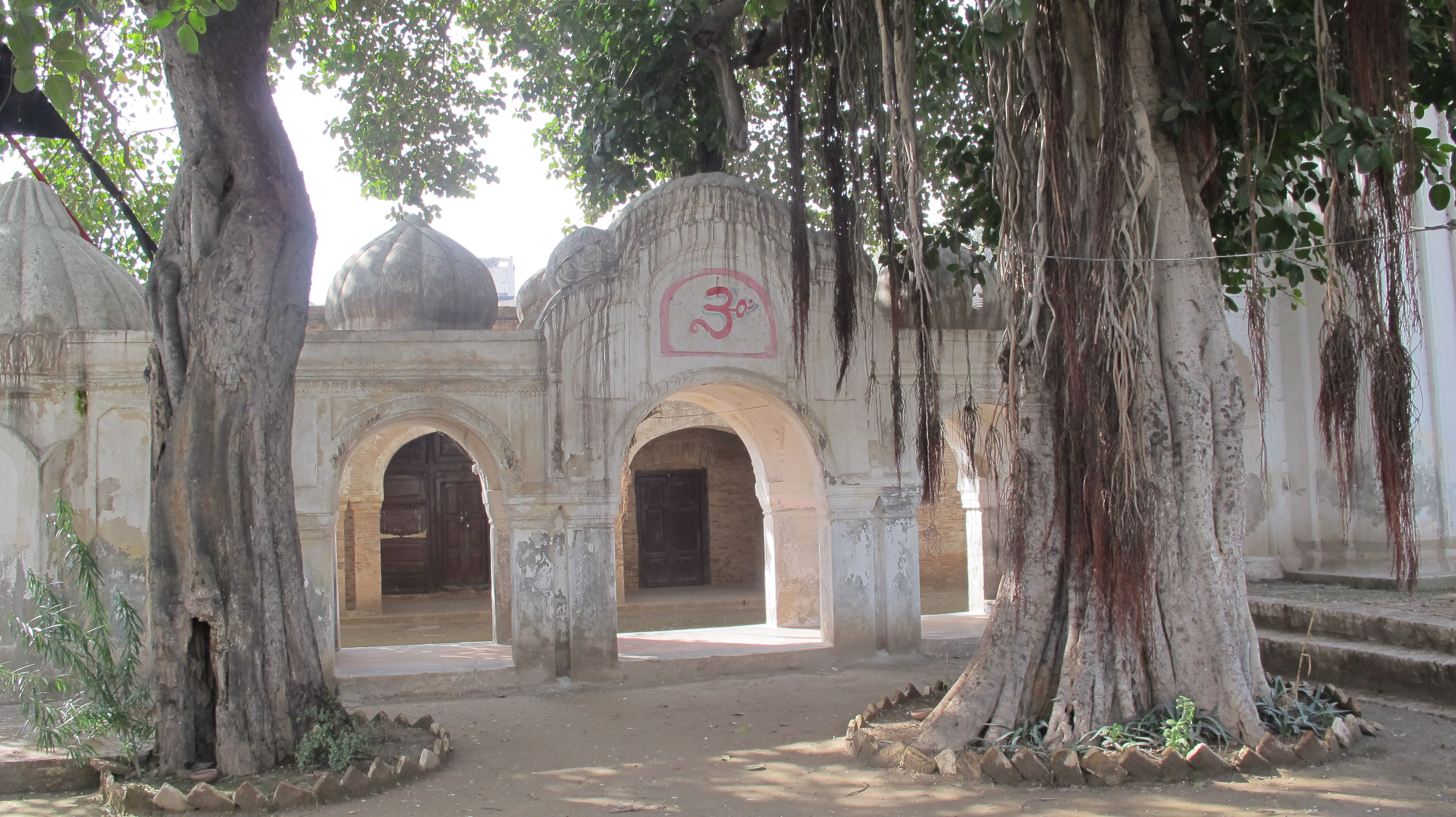
Hindu temple at the site

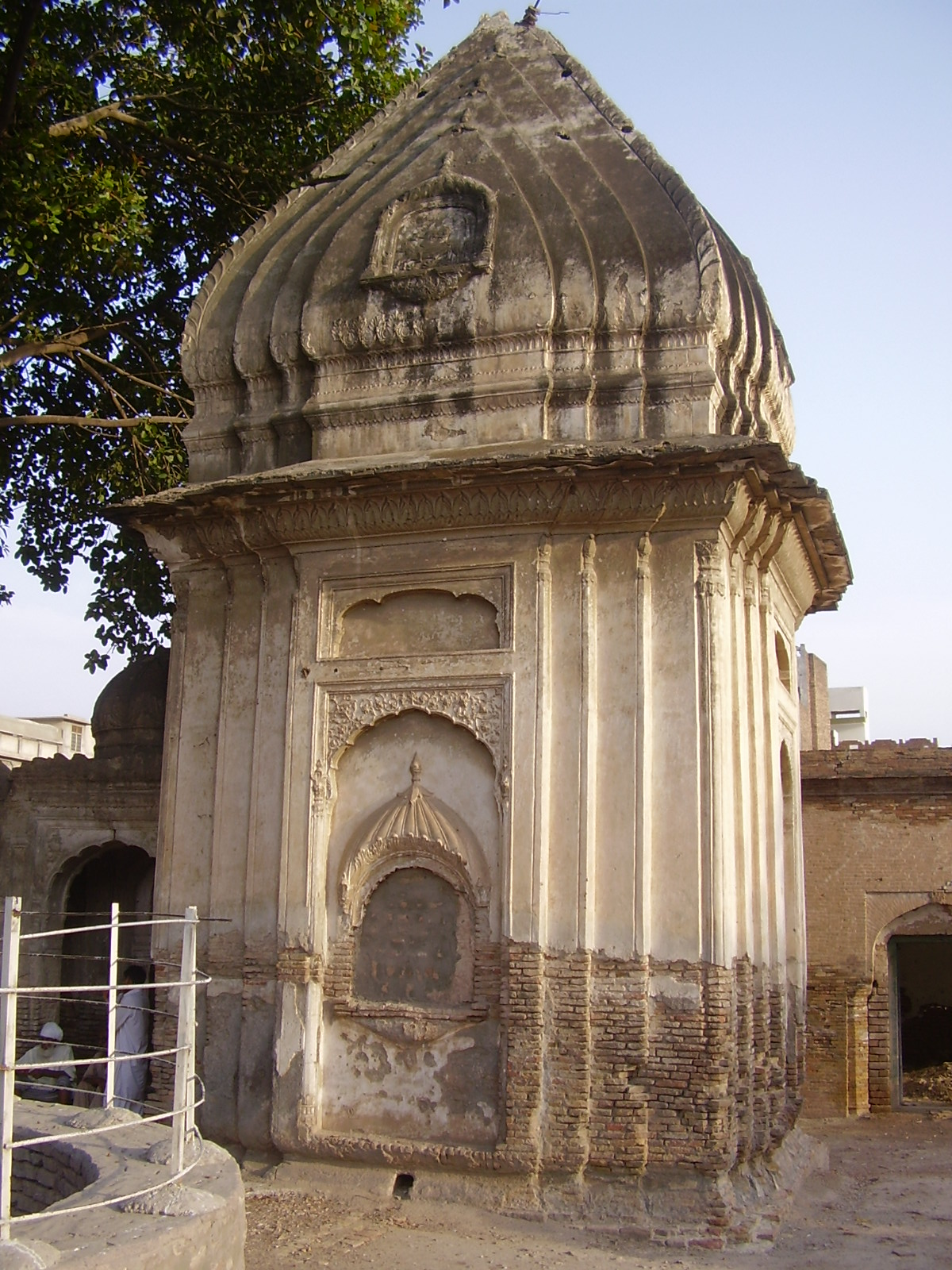
Goraknath Temple Peshawar

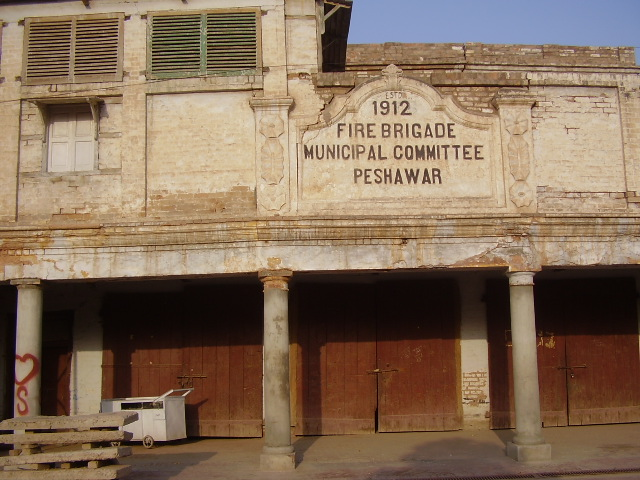
Old fire brigade

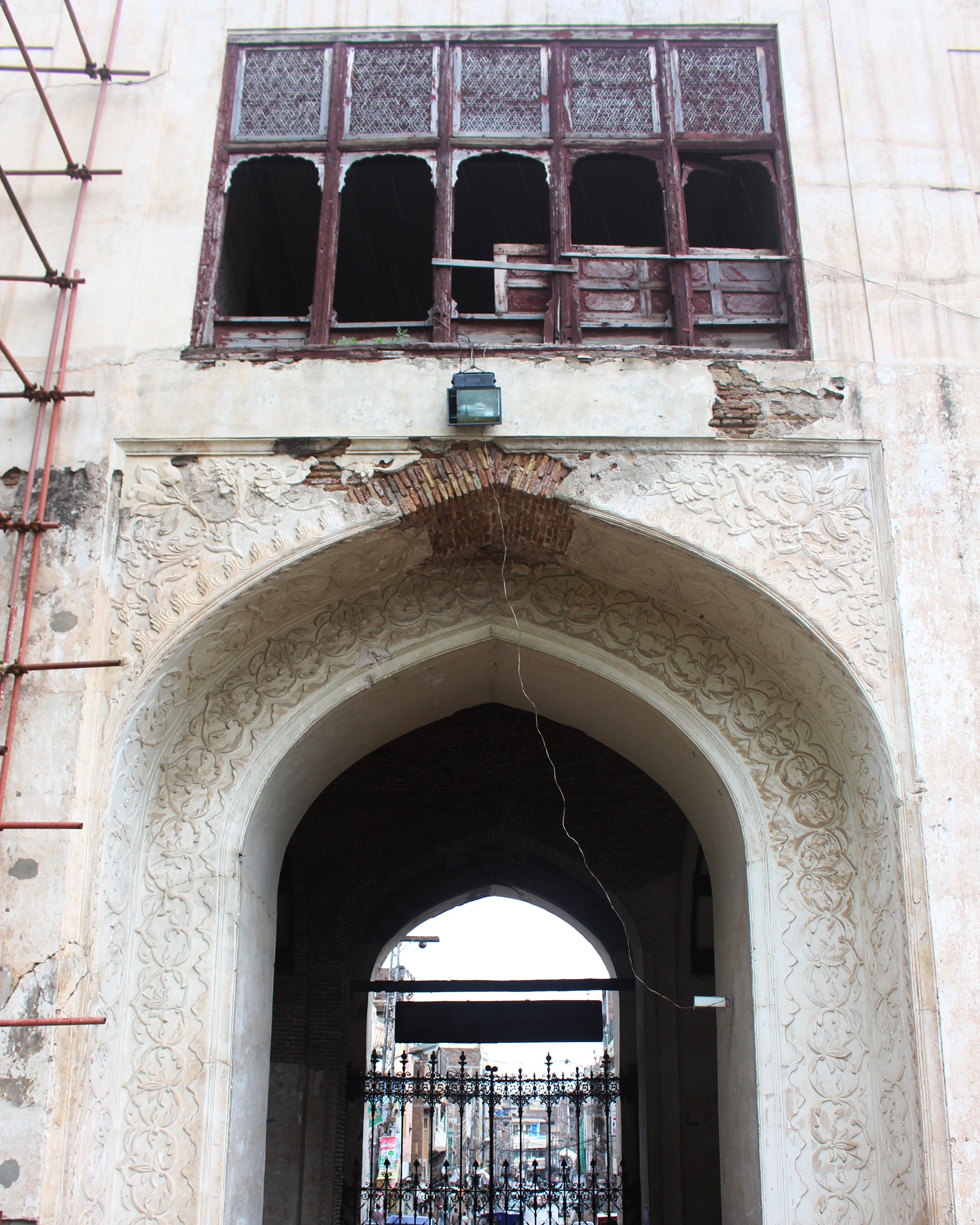
Closeup of Gorkhatri's entryway

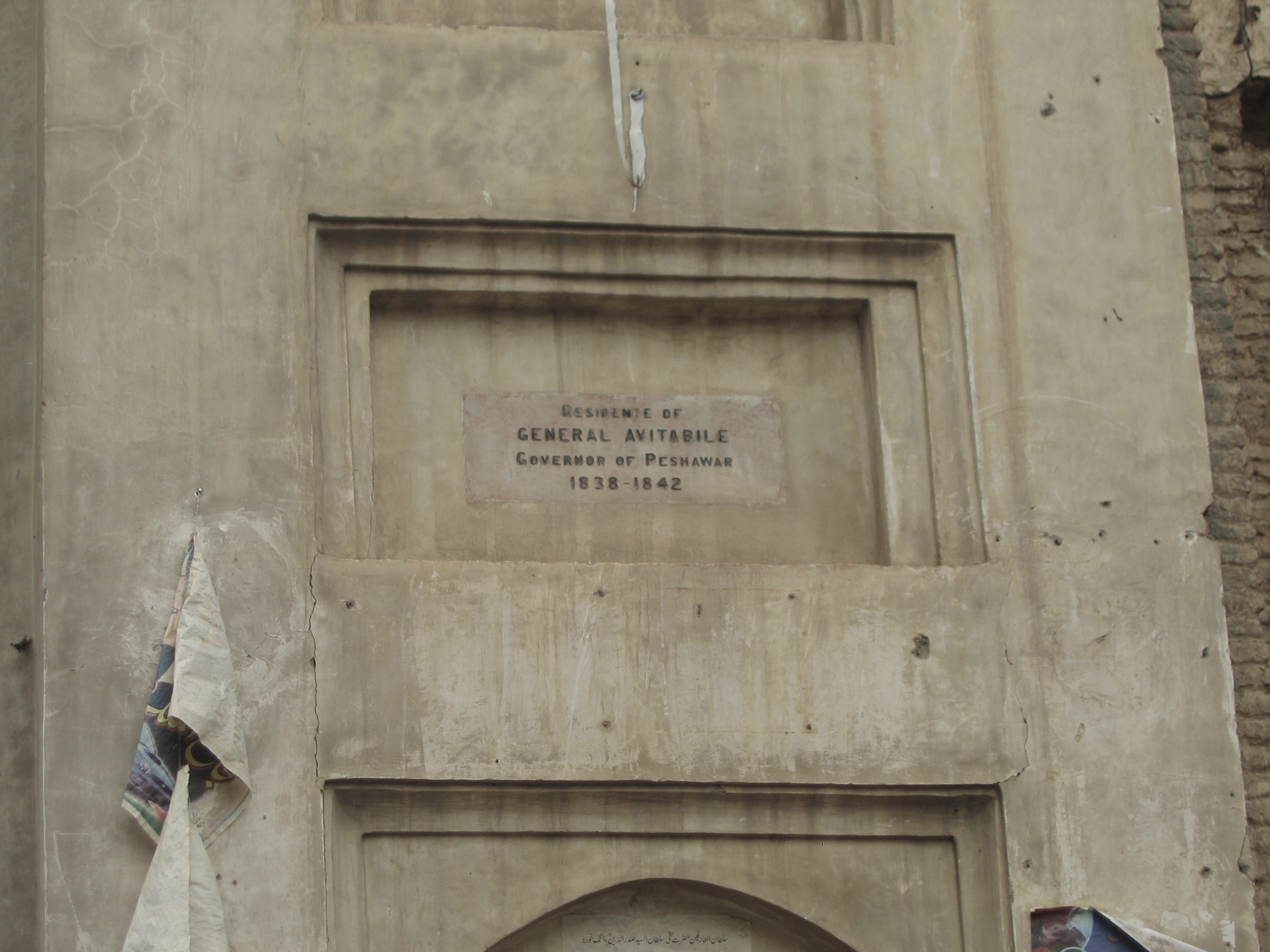
Plaque marking the former residence of Sikh-era General Paolo Avitable
