= Kalibari Mandir, Peshawar =

Hindu temple in Peshawar, Pakistan

Kalibari Temple कालीबरी मंदिर
- Om

- Location within Pakistan

Religion
- Affiliation: Hinduism
- District: Peshawar
- Deity: Kali
- Governing body: Pakistan Hindu Council

Location
- Location: Peshawar
- State: (Khyber Pakhtunkhwa) KPK
- Country: Pakistan
- Interactive map of Kalibari Temple कालीबरी मंदिर
- Coordinates: 33°59′54.8″N 71°32′30.0″E

Architecture
- Type: Hindu temple
- Temple: 1

Website
- Pakistan Hindu Council

Kalibari Mandir (Sanskrit: कालीबरी मंदिर) is a Hindu temple in Peshawar Cantt in the Peshawar city, in the Khyber Pakhtunkhwa province of Pakistan. This temple is dedicated to the Hindu goddess Kali and Durga Puja is its main festival. Its a major temple with pilgrims coming from all parts of Khyber Pakhtunkhwa.

== History ==
It is one of the few surviving Hindu temple in Peshawar, along with Goraknath Mandir, Gor Khatri and Dargah Pir Ratan Nath Jee, Jhanda Bazaar. This is the only ongoing functional temple in daily use along with Dargah Pir Ratan Nath Jee, Jhanda Bazaar. Court ordered the Evacuee Trust Property Board to open the Goraknath Mandir, Gor Khatri, which opens once a year on Diwali.

In 2017, the temple renovation was started, which included construction of a Langar hall, replacing the existing roof, repairing the domes and new kalash installation.

== See also ==
- Hinduism in Pakistan
- Evacuee Trust Property Board
- Hinglaj Mata
- Katasraj temple
- Krishna Mandir, Lahore
- Multan Sun Temple
- Prahladpuri Temple, Multan
- Sadh Belo
- Shiv Mandir, Umerkot
- Shri Varun Dev Mandir
- Tilla Jogian
