= Farzand Ali Durrani =

Pakistani archaeologist (1933 - 2003)

- Born: 1 January 1933; Charsadda, North-West Frontier Province, British India (now in Pakistan)
- Died: 10 December 2003 (aged 70)
- Occupations: Professor, archaeologist
- Known for: Founding member of the Department of Archaeology, University of Peshawar; establishing the Sir Sahibzada Abdul Qayyum Museum of Archaeology and Ethnology; contributions to the archaeology of the Province; development of the Gandhara Archaeological Project

Farzand Ali Durrani (1 January 1933 - 10 December 2003) was a Pakistani archaeologist known for his work on the Indus Valley Civilization, one of the world's earliest urban civilizations that flourished in the region of modern-day Pakistan and India from around 2600 BCE to 1900 BCE.

Durrani also served as a vice chancellor of Greenwich University Peshawar.

== Early life and education ==
Durrani was born on 1 January 1933, in Dheri Zardad, Pakistan. He earned a Bachelor of Arts degree from the University of Peshawar in 1961 and a Master of Arts degree in archaeology from the University of Punjab in 1965. He also obtained a PhD in archaeology from the University of London in 1971.

== Career ==
Durrani's work has focused on the archaeology and history of the Indus Valley Civilization. He has conducted excavations at several sites in Pakistan, including Harappa, Mohenjo-daro, and Kot Diji. His research has helped to shed light on various aspects of the Indus Valley Civilization, including its social organization, trade, technology, and religious practices.

Durrani has also written on the Indus Valley Civilization and other aspects of Pakistani archaeology. Some of his notable publications include "Excavations at Harappa," "The Indus Civilization: A People's History of Ancient Pakistan," and "The Balochistan Archaeological Project: An Overview." He has also served as the Director of the Department of Archaeology and Museums in Pakistan.
