= Goraknath Temple =

Hindu temple in Peshawar, Pakistan

Gorakhnath Temple گورکھ ناتھ مندر
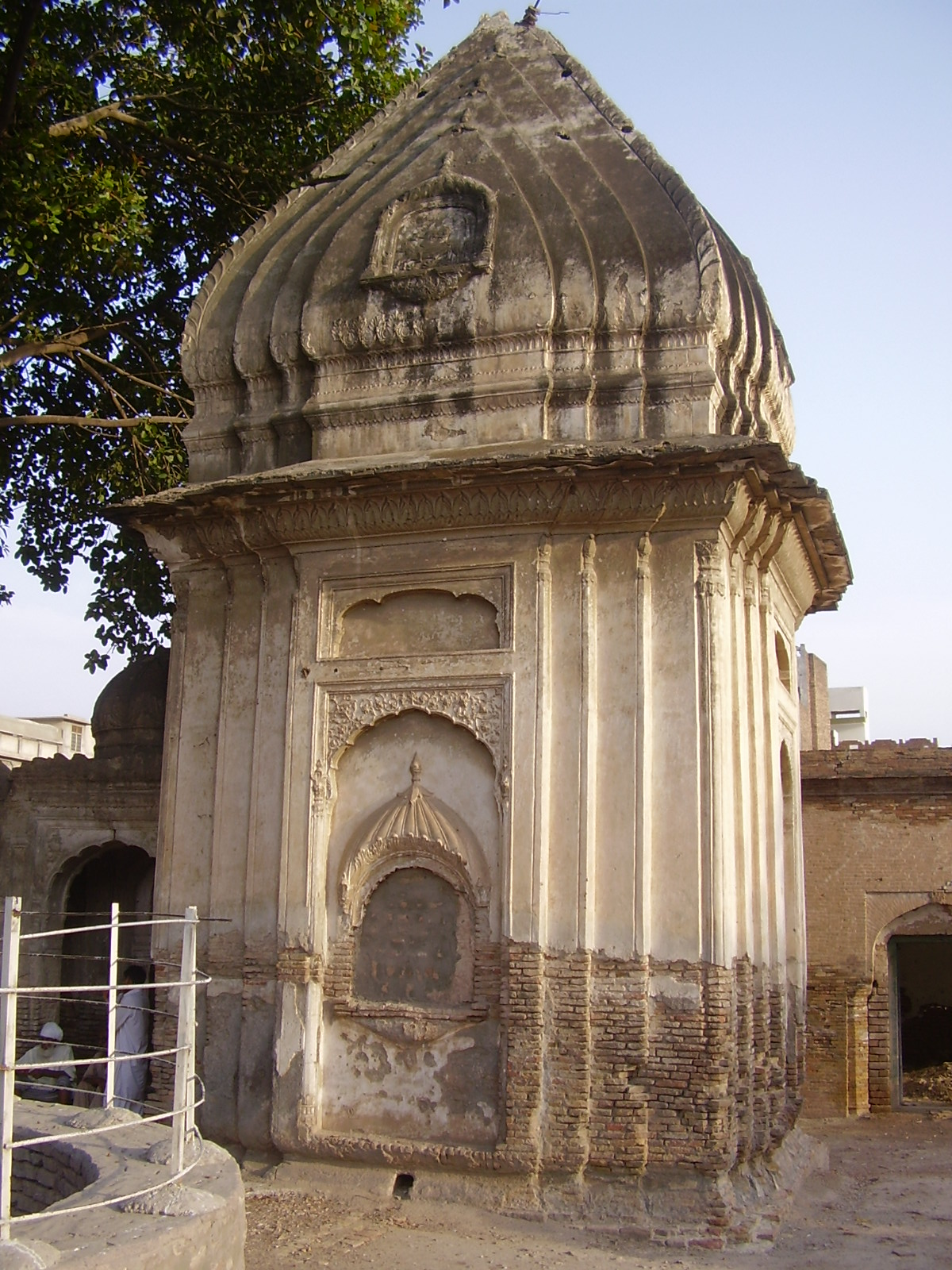

Religion
- Affiliation: Hinduism
- District: Peshawar
- Deity: Guru Gorakhnath
- Governing body: Pakistan Hindu Council

Location
- Location: Gor Khatri
- State: Khyber Pakhtunkhwa
- Country: Pakistan
- Interactive map of Gorakhnath Temple گورکھ ناتھ مندر
- Coordinates: 34°00′29.5″N 71°34′50.3″E

Architecture
- Type: Hindu temple
- Completed: 1851; 175 years ago
- Temple: 1

Website
- Pakistan Hindu Council

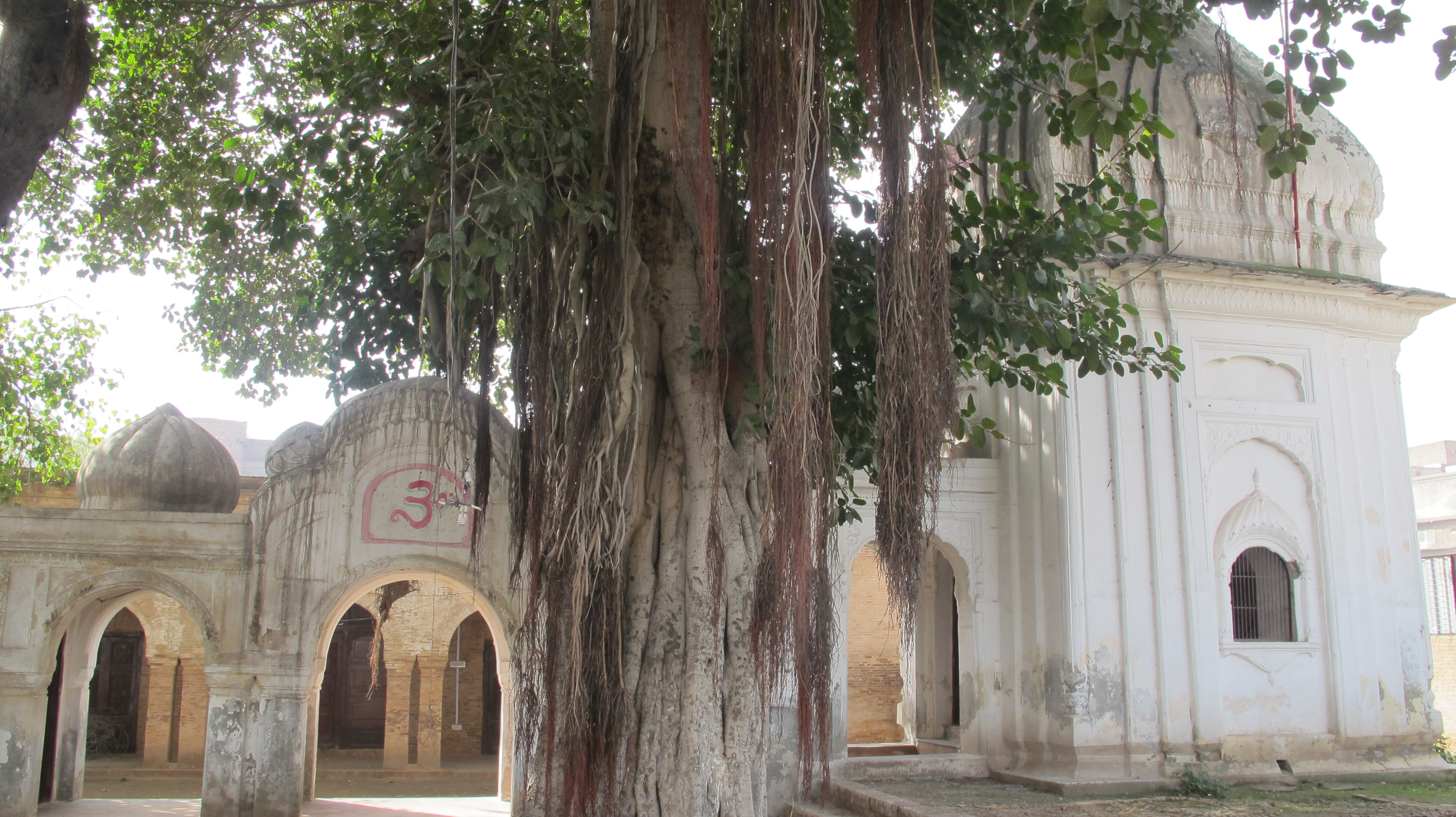
Temple and its Banyan tree

Goraknath Temple (Urdu: گورکھ ناتھ مندر) is a Hindu temple located in the Gorkhatri area of Peshawar in Khyber Pakhtunkhwa, Pakistan. The temple is dedicated to Gorakhnath. The temple was built in 1851. The temple has been declared as a heritage site.

== History ==
Goraknath Temple is one of the few surviving Hindu temples in Peshawar, along with Kalibari Mandir and Dargah Pir Ratan Nath Jee. The Peshawar High court ordered the Evacuee Trust Property Board to open this temple (or mandir) as a result of the petition filing by the daughter of the temple priest. It may have been constructed during the rule of the governor Avitabile during the years 1838–1842, but an earlier dating of between 1823–1830 has also been suggested for its date of erection. The Gor Khatri temple is divided into two areas on a west-east axis: the eastern versus western shrines, which are connected by a chamber.

== Current status ==
The temple was reopened in 2011 following the Peshawar High Court order on ligitation filed by the Hindu community along with declaring it as a heritage site. Following the reopening of the temple, it was attacked three times in the following two months. In the third such attack, the attackers burnt the pictures of gods inside the temple and took away the idols, the statue of Shiva was smashed to pieces and the Gita was burnt down.

== See also ==
- Hinduism in Pakistan
- Evacuee Trust Property Board
- Hinglaj Mata
- Katasraj temple
- Krishna Mandir, Lahore
- Multan Sun Temple
- Prahladpuri Temple, Multan
- Sadh Belo
- Shiv Mandir, Umerkot
- Shri Varun Dev Mandir
- Tilla Jogian
