= Dargah Pir Ratan Nath Jee =

Dargah Pir Ratan Nath Jee درگاہ پیر رتن ناتھ جی
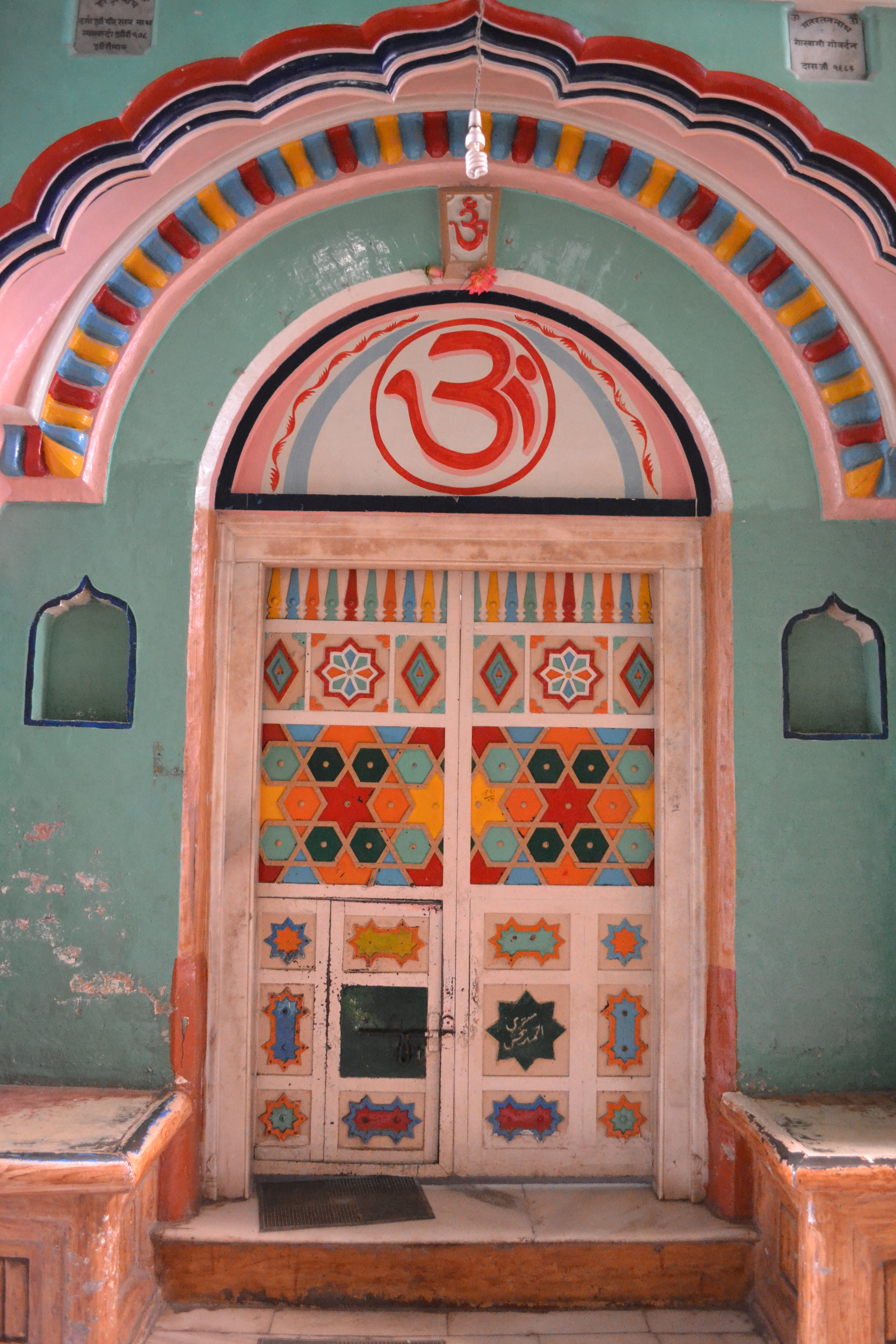

- Location within Pakistan

Religion
- Affiliation: Hinduism
- District: Peshawar
- Deity: Shiva
- Governing body: Pakistan Hindu Council

Location
- Location: Jhanda Bazar
- State: Khyber Pakhtunkhwa
- Country: Pakistan
- Interactive map of Dargah Pir Ratan Nath Jee درگاہ پیر رتن ناتھ جی
- Coordinates: 34°00′41.7″N 71°34′43.9″E

Architecture
- Type: Hindu temple
- Temple: 1

Website
- Pakistan Hindu Council

Dargah Pir Ratan Nath Jee (Urdu: درگاہ پیر رتن ناتھ جی) is a Hindu temple located in Jhanda Bazar locality of Peshawar city, the capital of Khyber Pakhtunkhwa province of Pakistan. The temple is dedicated to Sri Ratan Nath, who is a saint belong to the Nath Tradition of Shaivism. Lord Shiva is worshipped here and Maha Shivratri is the main festival.

== History ==
It is one of the few surviving Hindu temple in Peshawar, along with Kalibari Mandir and Goraknath Mandir, Gor Khatri. This is the only ongoing functional temple in daily use along with Kalibari Mandir. Court ordered the Evacuee Trust Property Board to open the Goraknath Mandir, Gor Khatri, which opens once a year on Diwali.

== January 2016 attack ==
In January 2016, two unidentified assailants escaped after shooting dead the government appointed policeman on guard at the temple.

== See also ==
- Hinduism in Pakistan
