= Doaba Daudzai Tehsil =

The Doaba Daudzai Tehsil was a tehsil administrative division in Peshawar District, Peshawar Division, Punjab Province, British India 1872–1893. As of 1891, it was one of the 128 tehsils in the province. Gholam Muhayuddin Khan served as tehsildar of the Doaba Daudzai tehsil. The areas of the erstwhile Doaba Daudzai tehsil are today part of Pakistan.

== Geography ==
The Doaba Daudzai tehsil included 159 villages and had an area of 182 square miles. As of 1868 the estimated population of area had been 72,676. The tehsil included the tongue of land lying between the Kabul and Swat rivers above their junction, as well as a piece of land south of the Kabul river. Overall, the lands were fertile with plenty of water supply for agriculture.

== Foundation ==
The tehsil was founded on 1 April 1872, as the tehsils of Peshawar District were reorganized to create a more balanced distribution of the population between them. Before the creation of the Doaba Daudzai tehsil, Doaba and Daudzai had been two separate tehsils with 53 and 127 villages respectively. With the re-districting of 1872, twenty villages from Daudzai tehsil were transferred to the Nowshera tehsil, and one village of Doaba tehsil (Shahi Kulali) was transferred to the Hashtnagar tehsil.

== Zails and tribes ==
The Doaba Daudzai tehsil was divided into six zails; Matta (14 villages), Gulbela (60 villages), Ambadher (22 villages), Shah Alam (11 villages), Charpariza (23 villages) and Daudzai (27 villages). All of these zails were dominated by Pathan tribes. The Gigyani tribe was prominent in the Matta and Ambadher zails. The Daudzai tribe was prominent in the zails of Gulbela, Shah Alam, Charpariza and Daudzai. The Sulaimanzai tribe was prominent in the Ambadher zail. The Bahlolzai was prominent in the Gulbela zail. There was also a certain Mohmand presence in Gulbela zail.

== Towns ==
Two locations in Doaba Daudzai were officially classified as 'towns', Fort Shankargarh and Fort Michni. According to the 1881 census of British India, Fort Shankargarh had 1,367 inhabitants (879 male, 488 female) and Fort Michni had 208 inhabitants (205 male, 3 female).

== Mafis ==
There were 329 mafis (grants of lands free of revenue) linked to mosques in the tehsil. Covering a combined area of 528 acres, none of the mosque mafis extended more than 10 acres. There were also 6 Hindu mafis, granted by Sikh rulers for an extended period of time.

== Abolition ==
The Doaba Daudzai tehsil was abolished as per the Punjab Gazette Notifications 379 and 380, issued on 13 May 1893. The areas of the erstwhile Doaba Daudzai tehsil were divided between the Peshawar and Charsadda tehsils.
