= Dheri Zardad =

Coordinates: 34°2′44″N 71°50′9″E

Dheri Zardad Momin khan dhreay
- Town and union council
- Interactive map of Dheri Zardad
- Country: Pakistan
- Province: Khyber Pakhtunkhwa
- District: Charsadda District
- Time zone: UTC+5 (PST)

Dheri Zardad is a town and union council of Charsadda District in Khyber Pakhtunkhwa province of Pakistan. It is located on the bank of the Kabul River at 34°2'44N 71°50'9E and has an altitude of 258 metres (849 feet). It was built by Zardad Khan Popalzay Durrani, who was the governor of the then Peshawar province under the Durrani Empire; he purchased the land and the village was built as a hunting place.

Dheri Zardad is an area prone to floods.
