= Bala Hissar, Peshawar =

Historic fortress in Pakistan

Coordinates: 34°00′49.0″N 71°34′11.3″E

Bala Hissar Fort
- قلعہ بالاحصار
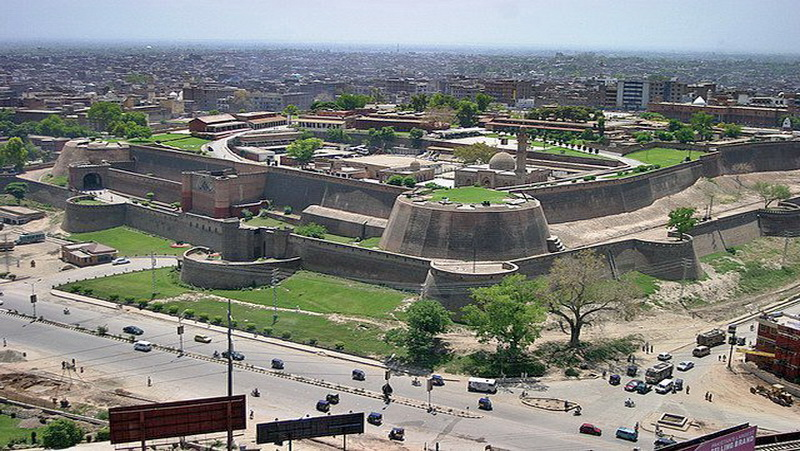
- Interactive map of the Bala Hissar Fort area
- Former names: Bagram Fort; Samīr Gaṛh

General information
- Type: Cultural
- Location: Peshawar, Khyber Pakhtunkhwa, Pakistan
- Completed: 1849
- Owner: Mughal Empire (1526–1739); Afsharid Empire (1739–1748); Durrani Empire (1748–1758; 1759–1823); Maratha Empire (1758–1759); Sikh Empire (1823–1849); British Indian Empire (1849–1947); Pakistan (1947-present)

Bala Hissar (Pashto/Urdu /Hindko: قلعہ بالاحصار), also spelt Bala Hisar, is a historic fortress located in Peshawar, Khyber Pakhtunkhwa, Pakistan. The existence of a fort at the location was first mentioned by 7th-century explorer Xuanzang; the fort was used as a royal residence for the Durrani Empire since 1772, when Timur Shah Durrani made Peshawar his capital. The Sikh Empire destroyed and reconstructed the fort after conquering Peshawar in March 1823. In 1849, the British East India Company reconstructed the fort's outer walls.

The fort now serves as headquarters for Pakistan's Frontier Corps.

== Etymology ==
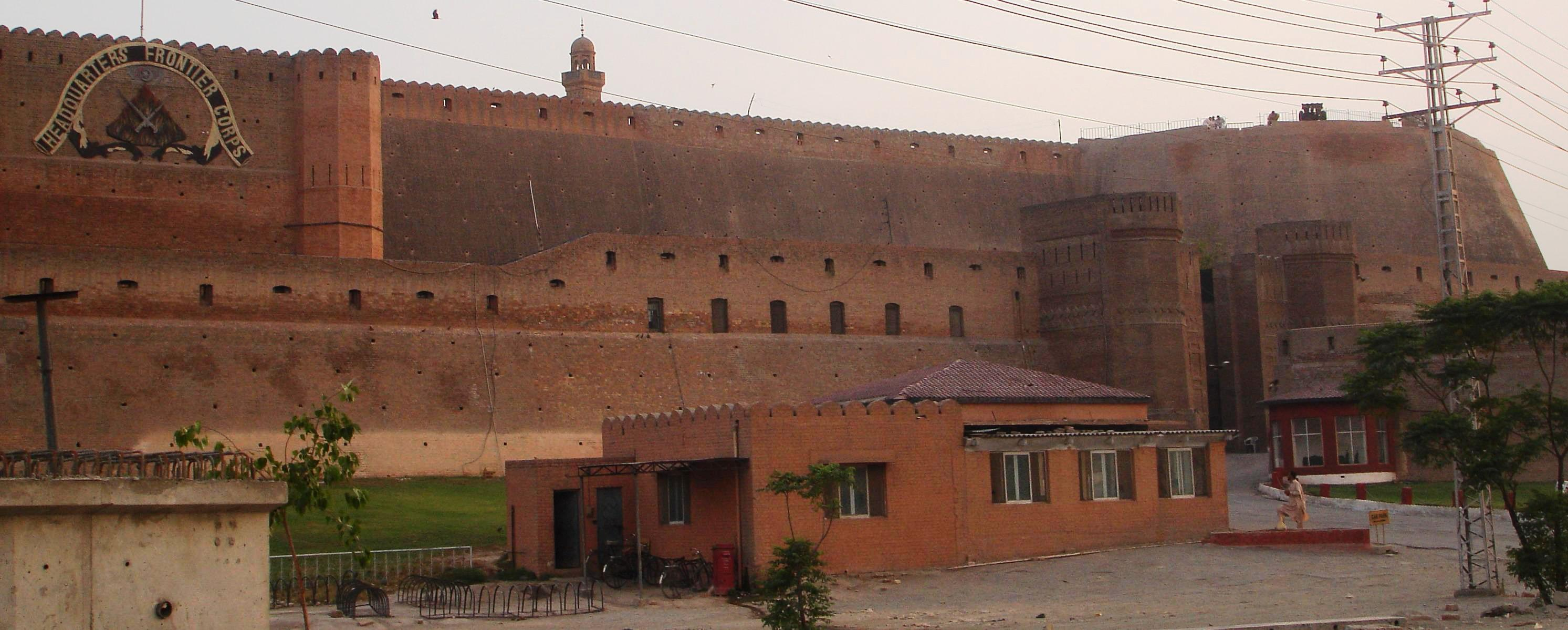
Pakistan's Frontier Corps is headquartered at the fort.

The word Bālā Hissār (بالا حصار) means "high fortress". After capturing the fort in 1834, the Sikhs named the fort Samīr Gaṛh or Sameer Garh. Samīr was another name for Mount Kailash, a high peak in Tibet considered sacred in Hinduism, Buddhism, and Sikhism; Gaṛh means "fortress" in Hindustani. However, this name did not become popular and was soon replaced again by "Bala Hissar".

During the times of the Mughal Empire and Sur Empire, it was known as "Bagram Fort" after Bagram, an older name for Peshawar.

== History ==
According to historian Ahmad Hasan Dani, a Chinese Buddhist monk and traveller Xuanzang, when visiting Peshawar in 630 AD, found a "royal residence" and called it with Chinese word Kung Shing, which is used for its significance and is explained as fortified or walled portion of the town in which the royal palace stood. Hiuen Tsang (Xuanzang) then makes a separate mention of the city, which was not fortified. This shows that the royal residence formed the nucleus of a Citadel, which must have been further protected by a moat. Dani further says that a channel of old Bara River surrounded by a high spot, which includes the Bala Hissar and Inder Shahr. The higher area could have been the citadel, which is the present Bala Hissar. The fort still existed during the time of the Mughal Emperor Babur, who referred to it as Bagram Fort.

The fort was used as a royal residence for the Durrani Empire since December 1747, when Ahmad Shah Durrani conquered Peshawar. The Battle of Peshawar took place on 8 May 1758 between the Hindu Maratha Empire and the Durrani Empire. The Marathas were victorious in the battle and Peshawar was captured. After being defeated by the army of Marathas, Durranis with Jahan Khan and Timur Shah Durrani left the fort meanwhile Marathas captured and took control of the fort. The victory in this battle was considered a great success for Marathas as now their rule had extended to the border of Afghanistan, located 2000 km far from their capital Pune. It was reconquered by Ahmad Abdali in 1759. The Durrani Shah Timur Shah Durrani (1773–1793) used the fort as the winter capital of his empire.

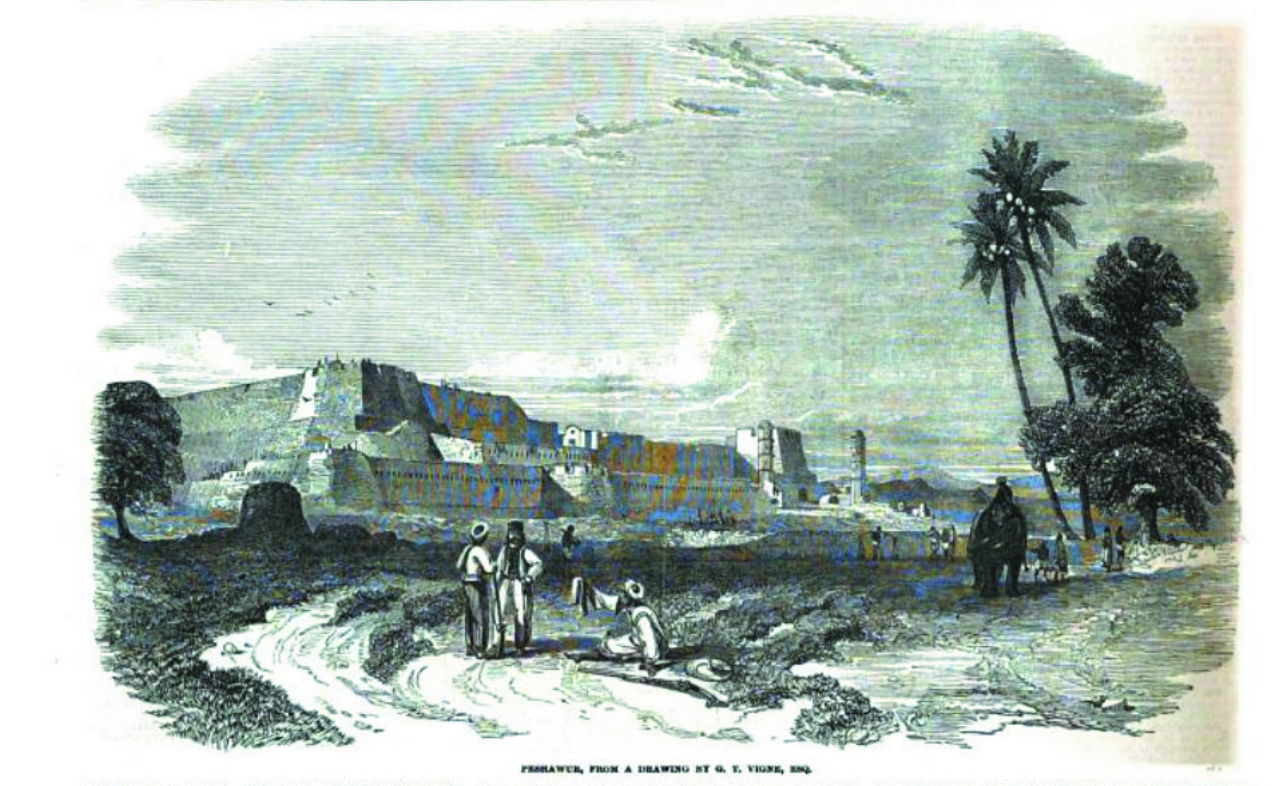
Bala Hissar Fort in Peshawur from a drawing by G.T. Vigne, ESQ. in 1834.

The Sikhs fought and defeated the Durrani Empire at the Battle of Nowshera near Peshawar in March 1823. They followed by the destruction of the Afghan royal court and the fort. Soon after, the Sikh commander-in-chief Hari Singh Nalwa commenced the reconstruction of the fort.

After the First Anglo-Sikh War in 1845–46, the British East India Company reconstructed the outer walls of Bala Hissar in 1849.

The fort is now used by the Frontier Corps, a paramilitary unit of the Pakistan Army.

== Tourism ==
The provincial government has expressed desire the control of the fort from the Frontier Corps in order to open it to tourists. The fort has been opened for tourists (Saturday for families only and Sundays will be opened for everyone, with or without family) without any cost, but tourists are requested to bring their CNIC along with them, while international tourists are requested to bring their passports. There is also a museum of the Frontier Corps in the fort showcasing the different uniforms of Frontier Corps throughout time since the start of Frontier Corps and weaponry used by different local units of Frontier Corps KP including but due to COVID-19 Fort is currently closed for all types of visits.

== See also ==
- List of UNESCO World Heritage Sites in Pakistan
- List of forts in Pakistan
- List of museums in Pakistan
