= List of places in Peshawar =

Islamia College

Peshawar, the capital of Khyber Pakhtunkhwa province is the largest city in the province and one of the largest in Pakistan. Here are some major landmarks in Peshawar:

== Education ==
The following is a list of some of the public and private universities in Peshawar:

- Islamia College University
- Khyber Medical University
- University of Peshawar
- University of Engineering and Technology, Peshawar
- Agricultural University (Peshawar)
- National University of Computer and Emerging Sciences, Peshawar Campus
- IMSciences (Institute of Management Sciences)
- Gandhara University
- Iqra National University (Formerly Peshawar Campus of Iqra University KPK)
- Qurtuba University
- Sarhad University of Science and Information Technology
- CECOS University of IT and Emerging Sciences
- Preston University
- City University of Science and Information Technology, Peshawar
- Frontier Women University
- Abasyn University

== Landmarks ==
The following is a list of other significant landmarks in the city that still exist in the 21st century:

- General
  - Governor's House
  - Peshawar Garrison Club
  - Kotla Mohsin Khan – the residence of Mazullah Khan, 17th century Pashtu poet
  - Qissa Khwani Bazaar
  - Kapoor Haveli Residence of Prithviraj Kapoor – famous Bollywood actor
- Forts
  - Bala Hisar Fort
- Colonial monuments
  - Chowk Yadgar (formerly the "Hastings Memorial")
  - Cunningham clock tower – built in 1900 and called "Ghanta Ghar"
- Buddhist
  - Gorkhatri – an ancient site of Buddha's alms or begging bowl, and the headquarters of Syed Ahmad Shaheed, Governor Avitabile
  - Pashto Academy – the site of an ancient Buddhist university
  - Shahji ki Dheri – the site of King Kanishka's famous Buddhist stupa. It was once the tallest stupa in India and served as the model for pagodas in China and Japan. The site is now a slum located outside the Gunj Gate of the old Walled City called Akhunabad. The stupa was described by Chinese pilgrims in the 7th century as the tallest stupa in all India with a height of 591–689 feet.
- Hindu
  - Panj Tirath – an ancient Hindu site with 5 sacred ponds, that has been converted into a park (Khyber-Pakhtunkhwa (K-P) Chamber of Commerce and Industry)
  - Gorkhatri - sacred site for yogis Guru Gorkhnath temple
  - Aasamai temple near Lady Reading Hospital (LRH)
- Sikh
  - Sikh Gurudwara at Jogan Shah
- Parks
  - Army Stadium – composed of an amusement park for children and families, restaurants, banks, play pens and a shopping arcade
  - Wazir Bagh – laid in 1802, by Fatteh Khan, Prime Minister of Shah Mahmud Khan
  - Ali Mardan Khan Gardens (also known as Khalid bin Waleed Park) – formerly named "Company Bagh"
  - Shahi Bagh – a small portion constitutes the site of Arbab Niaz Stadium
- Mosques
  - Mohabbat Khan Mosque
  - Qasim Ali Khan Mosque
- Museums
  - Peshawar Museum (Victoria Memorial Hall)
- Sports
  - Arbab Niaz Stadium

== See also ==
- Tourism in Pakistan
- Tourism in Khyber Pakhtunkhwa
