= Nishterabad =

Neighbourhood in Peshawar

- Location within Khyber Pakhtunkhwa Location within Pakistan
- Country: Pakistan
- Province: Khyber-Pakhtunkhwa
- District: Peshawar District
- Time zone: UTC+5 (PST)

Nishterabad (Pashto: ٖنشتر آباد, Urdu: نشتر آباد), also spelled as Nishtarabad, is a residential neighbourhood in Peshawar, in Khyber Pakhtunkhwa province, Pakistan. It is bordered by Hashtnagri to the west and Gulbahar to the east.

== Overview and History ==
Nishterabad is located off the Grand Trunk (GT) road in Peshawar. It is famous for its CDs and telefilms production and is the hub of CDs and telefilms business. The advent of mobile and internet streaming, and memory cards and USBs have led to the decline of CDs production. During its heydays (2004-2010), when the production of CD drama and telefilms business was at its peak, the production companies would produce up to 200 CDs on Eid but now the number is only 45 to 50.

== Administrative area ==
Nishterabad is part of Pakistan National Assembly seat NA-1 (Peshawar-1) while for KP Provincial Assembly it is part of PF-2 (Peshawar-2).

== Notable Personalities ==
- Farhatullah Babar
- Asif Bashir

== See also ==
- Hashtnagri
- Gulbahar Peshawar
