= Army Stadium =

Army Stadium may refer to:

- Army Stadium (Vietnam), now Quân khu 7 Stadium
- Army Stadium, Rawalpindi, Pakistan
- Army Stadium, Peshawar, Pakistan
- Bangladesh Army Stadium
- Bulgarian Army Stadium (Stadion Balgarska Armia)
- Egyptian Army Stadium
- Polish Army Stadium
- Royal Thai Army Stadium
- Yugoslav National Army Stadium (JNA Stadium), now Partizan Stadium
