= Faqeerabad, Peshawar =

Faqeerabad Peshawar فقير آباد
- Location within Khyber Pakhtunkhwa Location within Pakistan
- Country: Pakistan
- Province: Khyber-Pakhtunkhwa
- District: Peshawar District
- Time zone: UTC+5 (PST)

Faqeerabad (Pashto: ٖفقير آباد, Urdu: فقير آباد), also spelled as Faqirabad, is a neighbourhood of Peshawar, Khyber Pakhtunkhwa, Pakistan. Hashtnagri is located to the south while Charsadda Road is located to the west, all the way up to the northern end of Faqeerabad.

== Overview ==
The areas forming part of Faqeerabad are Zaryab Colony, Afghan Colony, Ashrafia Colony, Shakirabad, Zaheerabad and Shahi Bagh. The notable attractions of the Faqirabad are Shahi Bagh, Arbab Niaz Cricket Stadium, Tamas Khan Football Ground, Peshawar Gymkhana Cricket Ground, Municipal Inter college for Girls, Government College Peshawar and Peshawar Eidgah.

Since 2000, due to a surge in private educational institution, the area is now full of private commerce colleges and private hostels built in residential areas of Faqeerabad.

A sizeable population of illegal Afghans also live in the area. Most are Muslims with a small minority of Christians, Sikhs and Hindus. Major languages are Pashto, Hindko and Persian.

== Administrative Area and Census Information ==
Shalimar Garden Shahi Bagh Faqeerabad Peshawar

Faqeerabad is part of Pakistan National Assembly seat NA-31 (Peshawar-V) while for KP Provincial Assembly it is part of PF-1 (Peshawar-1).

According to the 1998 consensus, the population of Faqeerabad was 16,313 while the population of Shahi Bagh (also part of Faqirabad) was 18,102.

== Education ==
Educational institutions in Faqirabad are listed below:

- Government College Peshawar
- Frontier Institute of Management Sciences, Peshawar
- College of Physical Education and Research, Peshawar
- Municipal Inter Girls College Shahi Bagh Peshawar
- Jinnah Islamia College, Peshawar

== Sports ==
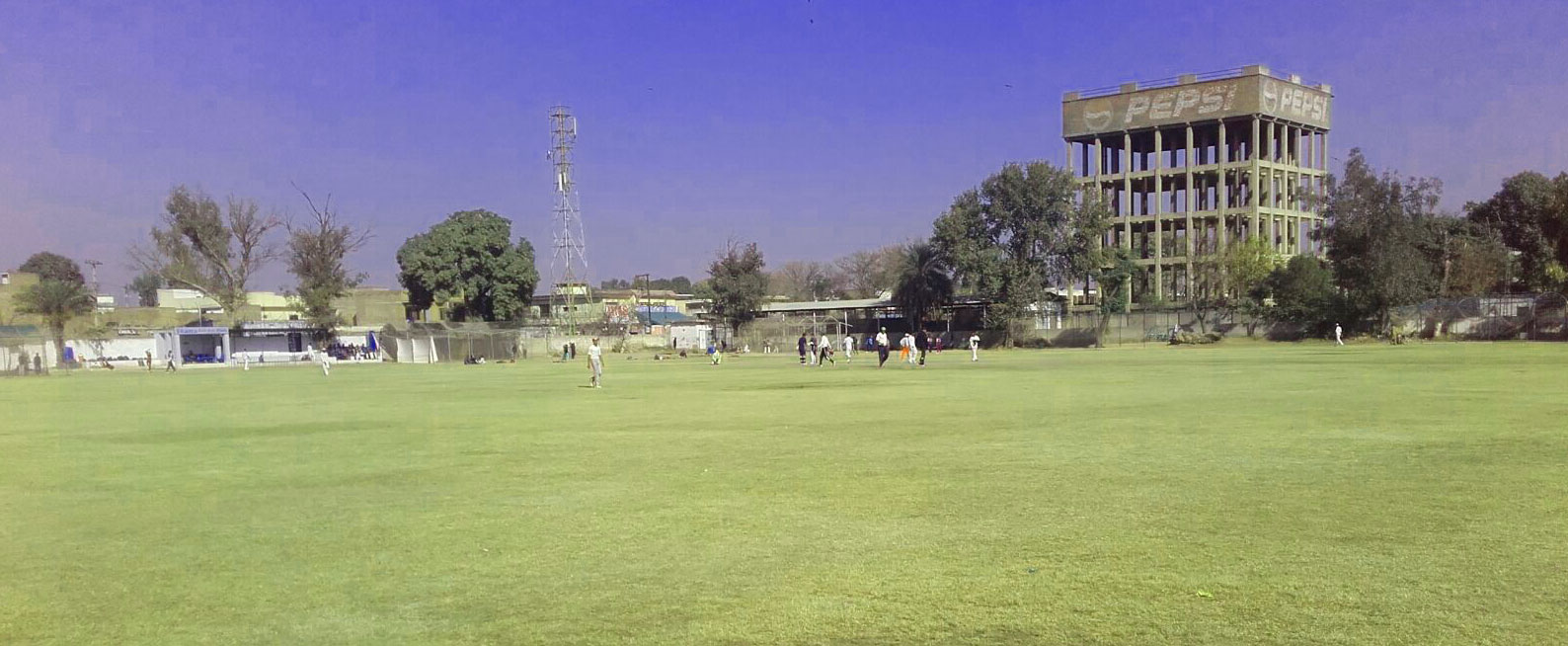
Peshawar Gymkhana Cricket Ground

The notable sporting attraction of this place is the Arbab Niaz Stadium, which hosted international matches, including World Cup matches in 1987 and 1996. A small cricket ground, Peshawar Gymkhana Ground, is also located here, along with a football ground, Tehmas Khan Football Stadium.

Cricket is the most popular sport. The sport is commonplace at night during the month of Ramadan. Other popular sports include snooker, English billiards, hockey, and table tennis.

== See also ==
- Peshawar
- Shahi Bagh Peshawar
- Gulbahar
- Hashtnagri
