= Aram Bagh =

Aram Bagh may refer to the following places:

- Aram Bagh, Agra, locality in Agra, India
- Aram Bagh, Karachi, locality in Karachi, Pakistan
