= Battis Khamba =

17th century Mughal tower

Coordinates: 27°12′34″N 78°02′17″E

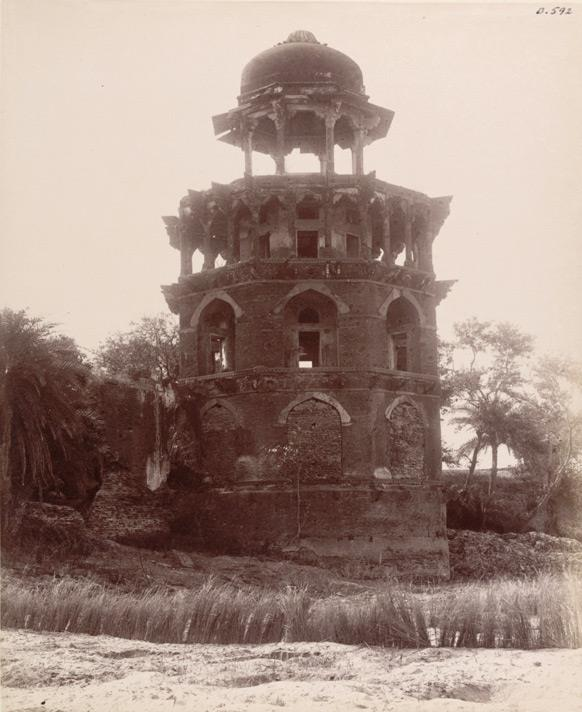
Battis Khamba, c. 1893

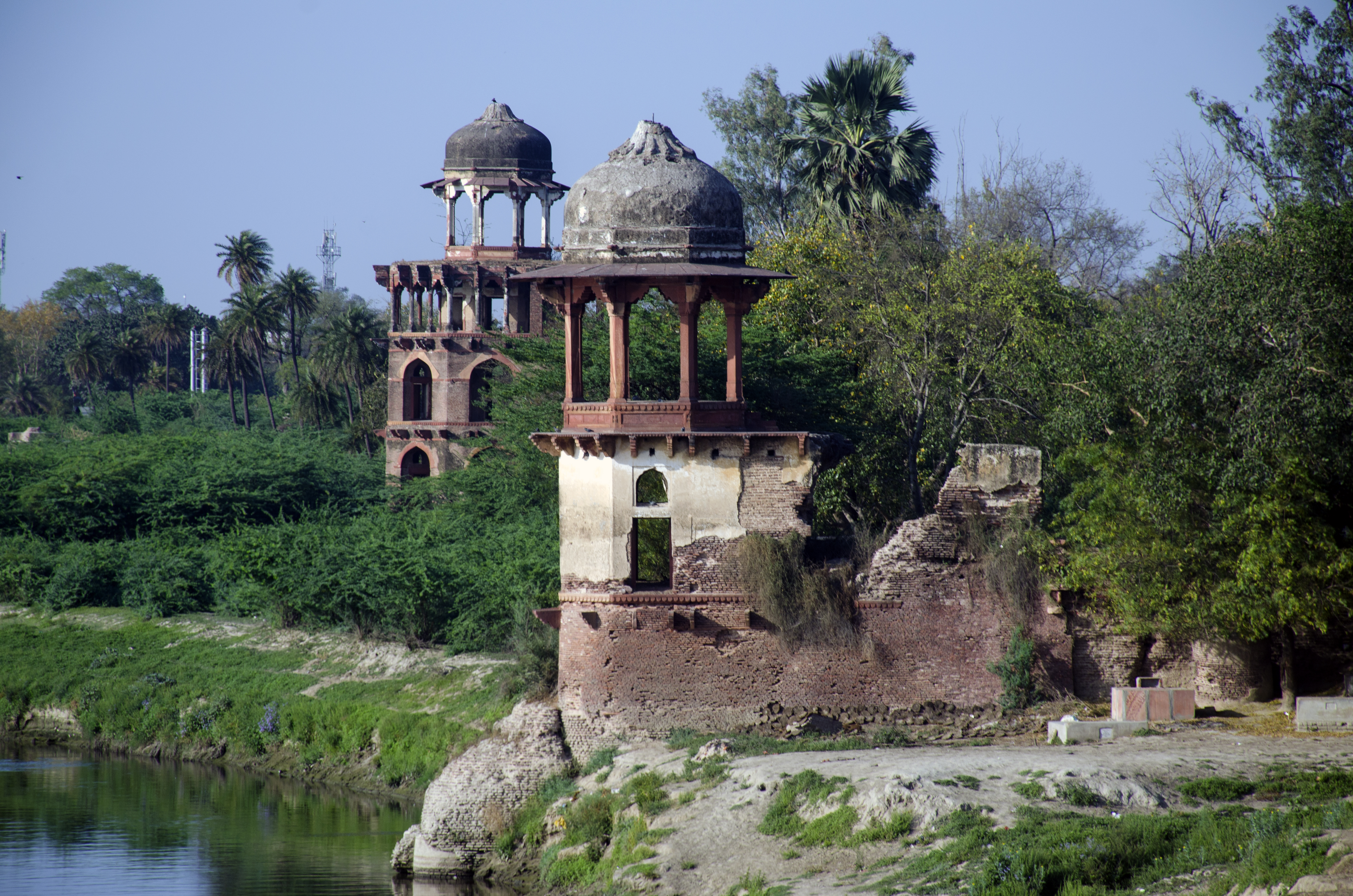
Battis Khamba seen from Ram Bagh

Battis Khamba (literally "tower of thirty-two pillars") is a tower located in Agra, in the Indian state of Uttar Pradesh.

== Background ==
The tower is dated to 1615–1620, during the reign of the Mughal emperor Jahangir. Traces of an extension on southeastern side of the tower indicate that it was originally part of a larger complex. It was part of a garden known as Buland Bagh (literally, "high garden"), built by a eunuch known as Buland Khan, who served in Jahangir's court.

While there is no record regarding the purpose of the tower, it is presumed to have served as a lighthouse and a check-post, for collecting duties on goods transported across the Yamuna river. The area in which the tower stood was part of the jagir (grant) of the empress Nur Jahan. An account by Dutch merchant Francisco Pelsaert, who lived in Agra in the 1620s, notes that the officers of the empress imposed levies on all goods transported across the river.

It is part of a monument of national importance, listed as "Chattries on the Yamuna bank to the north of Ram Bagh, Agra", protected by the Archaeological Survey of India. As of 2020, a fence has been built around the monument.

== Description ==
As described by the architectural historian Ram Nath, the tower has an octagonal plan, and is built out of brick and stone masonry. It has three stories, with a chhatri (pavilion) structure mounted at the top.

On each side of the first story (ground floor) is an arched entrance leading into the interior, which is an octagonal hall. The second story (first floor) follows the same plan as the first. The third story (second floor) consists of an octagonal room in the center, surrounded by a columned veranda. While four pillars are present on each side, one of these is common to two sides, thus making for a total of 24 pillars, leading to the name of the tower, which literally translates to "tower of thirty-two pillars", to be described as a misnomer; however, the next level has an additional eight pillars for at total of 32.

In the middle of the terrace on the third floor, there is a chhatri with more pillars and brackets to support the surviving chhajja (eave or roof). Now in a dilapidated condition, it was originally covered with glazed tiles. A flight of steps on the southern side used to lead from the ground floor to the terrace. This has now been destroyed.
