= Bani Begum Garden =

Coordinates: 20.005781°N 75.1859601°E

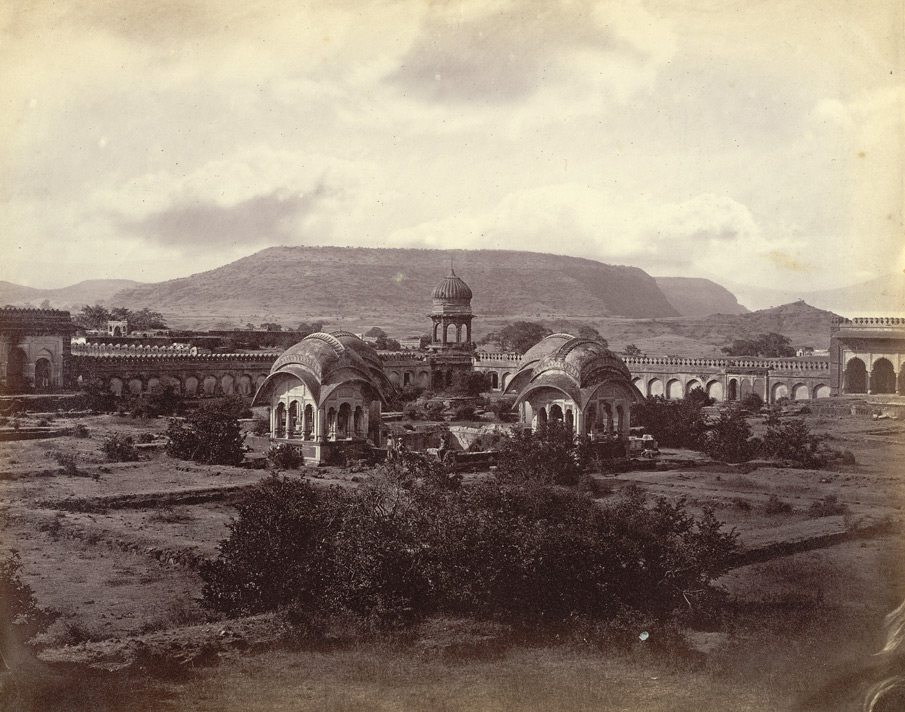
The garden with the mausoleum located in the middle

Bani Begum Garden is a Mughal garden located in Khuldabad, in the Indian state of Maharashtra. The garden contains the tomb of Jahan Bano Begum, who was the consort of the Mughal prince Bidar Bakht.

== Description ==
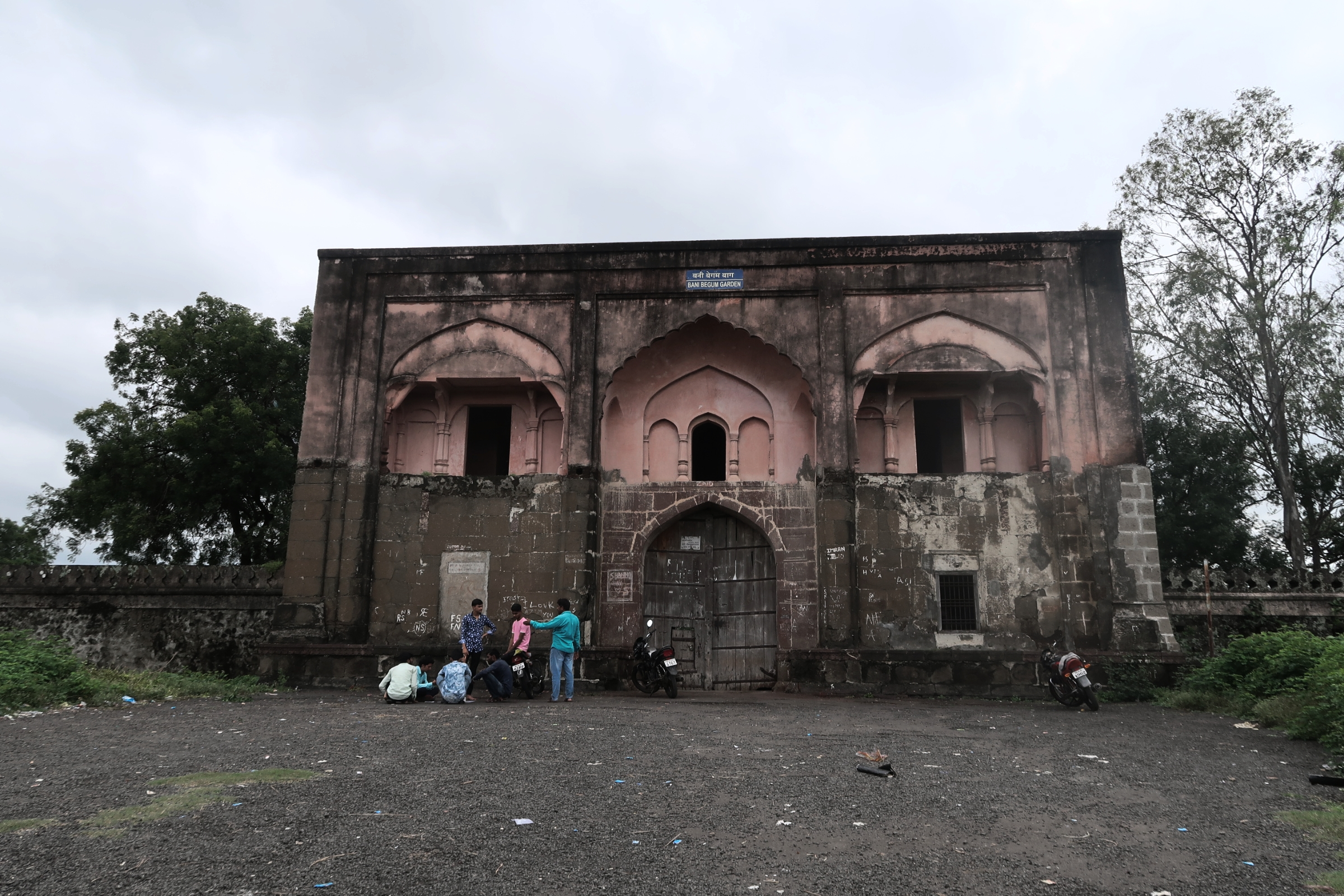
Bani Begum Garden

The garden is surrounded by a large wall, with kiosks at its four corners. The entrance is through the middle of the northern wall. In the middle of the western wall is a mosque. Baradaris are situated in the middle of the eastern and southern walls.

The garden is divided into four plots by means of water channels, along which are paths. Each of these four portions are further sub divided into four flower-beds.

=== Tomb of Bani Begum ===
The tomb of Bani Begum is located in the center of the garden. Four Bengali-style pavilions surround the tomb.
