= Jinnah Park, Peshawar =

Public park in Peshawar, Pakistan

Coordinates: 34°00′54.8″N 71°34′15.4″E

Jinnah Park Peshawar
- Interactive map of Jinnah Park Peshawar
- Type: Public recreational park
- Location: Peshawar, Khyber Pakhtunkhwa, Pakistan
- Area: Peshawar Pakistan
- Operator: Government of KPK, Pakistan
- Open: All year

Jinnah Park, formerly known as Cunningham Park, is a public park located in Peshawar city of Khyber Pakhtunkhwa province of Pakistan.

Jinnah Park is located on the Grand Trunk (GT) Road opposite to Balahisar Fort in Peshawar. It was called Cunningham Park in the past. In July 1947, British government held referendum regarding partition and joining of NWFP (now Khyber Pakhtunkhwa) either to India and Pakistan in Cunningham Park. In 2011, the Government of Khyber Pakhtunkhwa constructed digital fountain in the park.

== See also ==
- Shahi Bagh
- Wazir Bagh Peshawar
- Army Stadium Peshawar
