= Gulbahar, Peshawar =

Gulbahar Peshawar
- Location within Khyber Pakhtunkhwa Location within Pakistan
- Country: Pakistan
- Province: Khyber-Pakhtunkhwa
- District: Peshawar District
- Time zone: UTC+5 (PST)

Gulbahar (Pashto: ٖګل بهار, Urdu: گل بہار) is a neighbourhood of Peshawar in Khyber Pakhtunkhwa province of Pakistan. It was the first planned residential colony of the Peshawar city. It is located to the east of Nishterabad.

== Overview ==
Gulbahar is located off Grand Trunk Road and is a residential area of Peshawar city. The main attractions of the Gulbahar are Daewoo Bus Terminal, Government Technical and Vocational Centre and Government City Girls College.

Majority of the people living in Gulbahar are Pakistanis. Most of them are Muslims, with small population of Christians, Sikhs and Hindus. Major languages are Pashto, Hindko and Urdu.

== Administrative Area and Census Information ==
Gulbahar is part of Pakistan National Assembly seat NA-31 (Peshawar-V) while for KP Provincial Assembly, it is part of Constituency PK-77, formerly PF-2 (Peshawar-2).

According to 1998 consensus, the population of Gulbahar was 18,330.

== Educational Facilities ==
Gulbahar is home to some educational institutions. They are listed below:

- Government Technical And Vocational Centre Peshawar
- Government City Girls College Gulbahar Peshawar

== See also ==
- Faqeerabad
- Hashtnagri
- Nishterabad
