= Municipal Inter College for Girls, Peshawar =

Intermediate College

Coordinates: 34°1′22.3″N 71°34′41.3″E

Municipal Inter College for Girls Peshawar
- Address: Faqirabad, Near Arbab Niaz Stadium, Peshawar, Pakistan
- Type: Public Sector
- Location: Peshawar, Pakistan

Municipal Inter College for Girls, Peshawar is a secondary school and intermediate college located in Peshawar, Khyber Pakhtunkhwa, Pakistan. The college is affiliated with Board of Intermediate and Secondary Education, Peshawar for both Science and Arts courses of SSC and HSSC.

== Overview ==
Municipal Inter College for Girls is located at Shahi Bagh in Faqeerabad neighbourhood of Peshawar. Arbab Niaz Stadium is located to the south while Peshawar Gymkhana Cricket Ground is located to the west of the college. The college was created and managed by district government Peshawar to provide quality education in English to the children of the employees of the Municipal Corporation, Peshawar and general public at affordable price.

== See also ==
- Shahi Bagh
- Government College Peshawar
