= Cunningham Clock Tower =

British-era tower in Peshawar, Pakistan

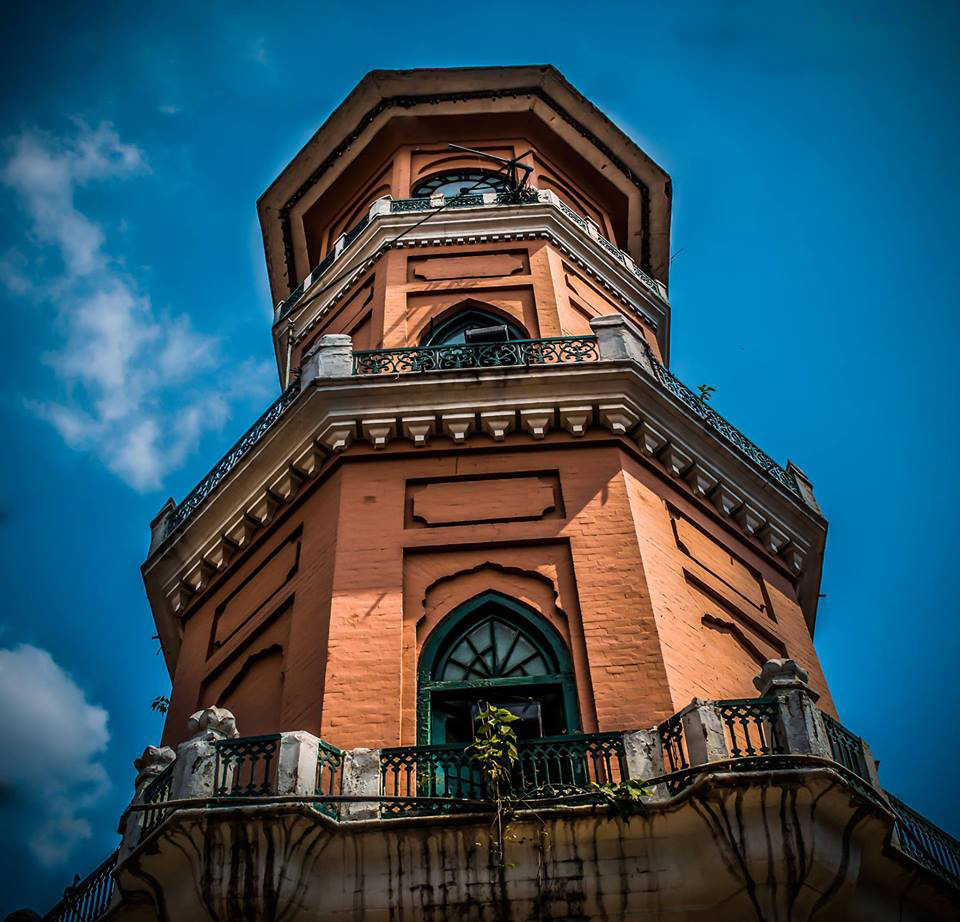
- Interactive map of Cunningham Clock Tower
- Location: Peshawar, Khyber Pakhtunkhwa, Pakistan
- Coordinates: 34.009846°N 71.575784°E
- Type: Clock tower
- Completion date: 1900

The Cunningham Clock Tower (Urdu: کننگہام گھنٹہ گھر; Pashto: د کانینګهم د ساعت برج) in Peshawar, Khyber-Pakhtunkhwa, Pakistan, was built in 1900, "in commemoration of Her Majesty the Queen Empress Victoria". The tower was named after the Commissioner of Peshawar, Sir Alexander Frederick Douglas Cunningham (son of Alexander Cunningham), not to be confused with Sir George Cunningham, former British governor and political agent in the province.

== History ==
Designed by James Strachan, the Municipal Engineer of Peshawar, the foundation stone was laid by Cunningham, commissioner of Peshawar in 1898. It was opened to the public in 1900 to commemorate the Diamond Jubilee of Queen Victoria. The construction of the building was funded by Balmukand Ahooja - Banker and Contractor of Peshawar

== Structure ==
The tower is 9.4 metres in diameter. Its base is 13 by 4 metres (43 ft × 13 ft) and stands 26 metres (85 ft) tall at the Ghanta Ghar Chowk ("Clock Tower Square").

== Gallery ==
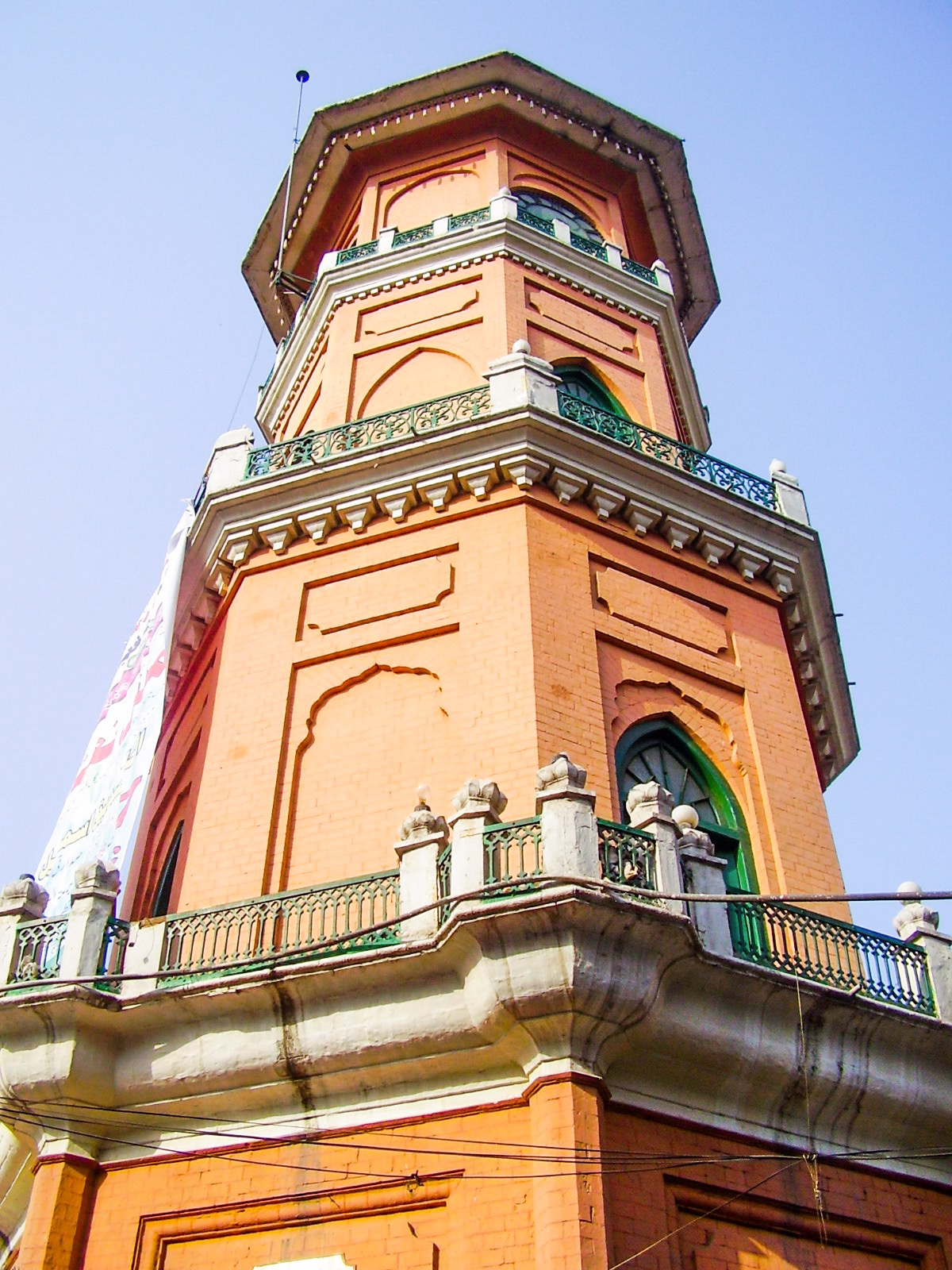

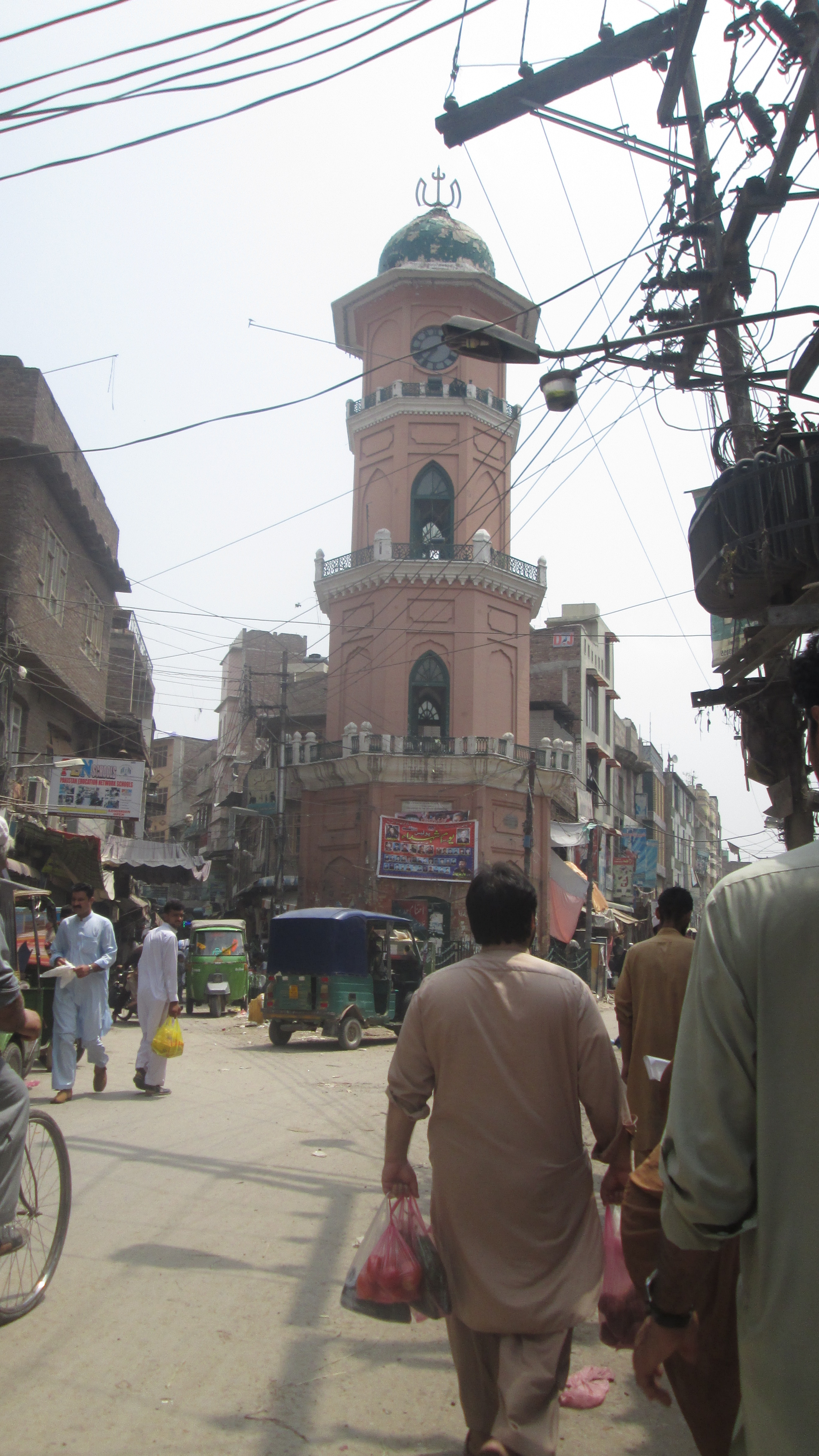

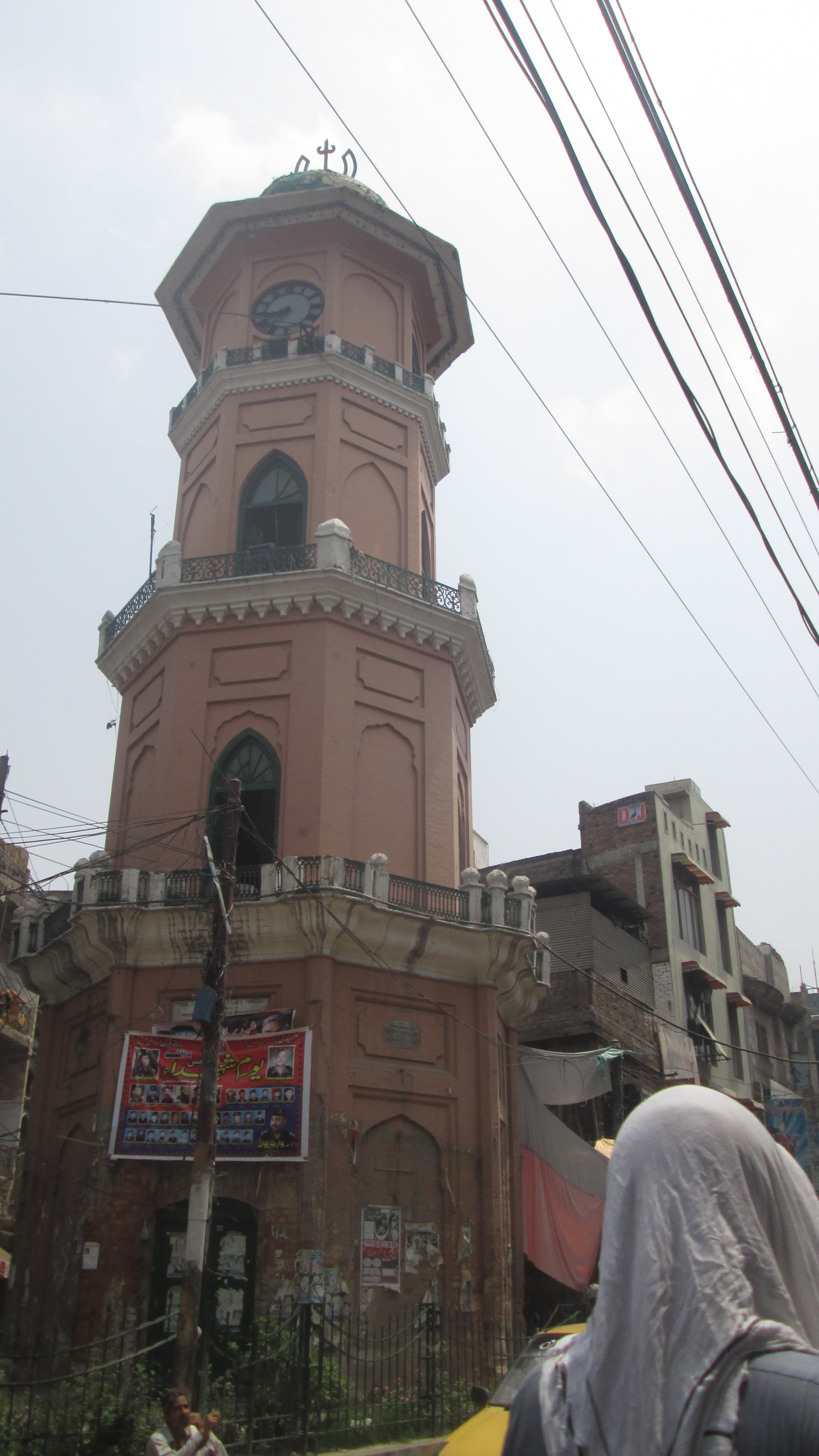

== See also ==
- List of clock towers in Pakistan
