= Peshawar Gymkhana Ground =

Cricket ground in Peshawar, Pakistan

Coordinates: 34°01′20.0″N 71°34′35.0″E

- د پېښور جمخانه میدان
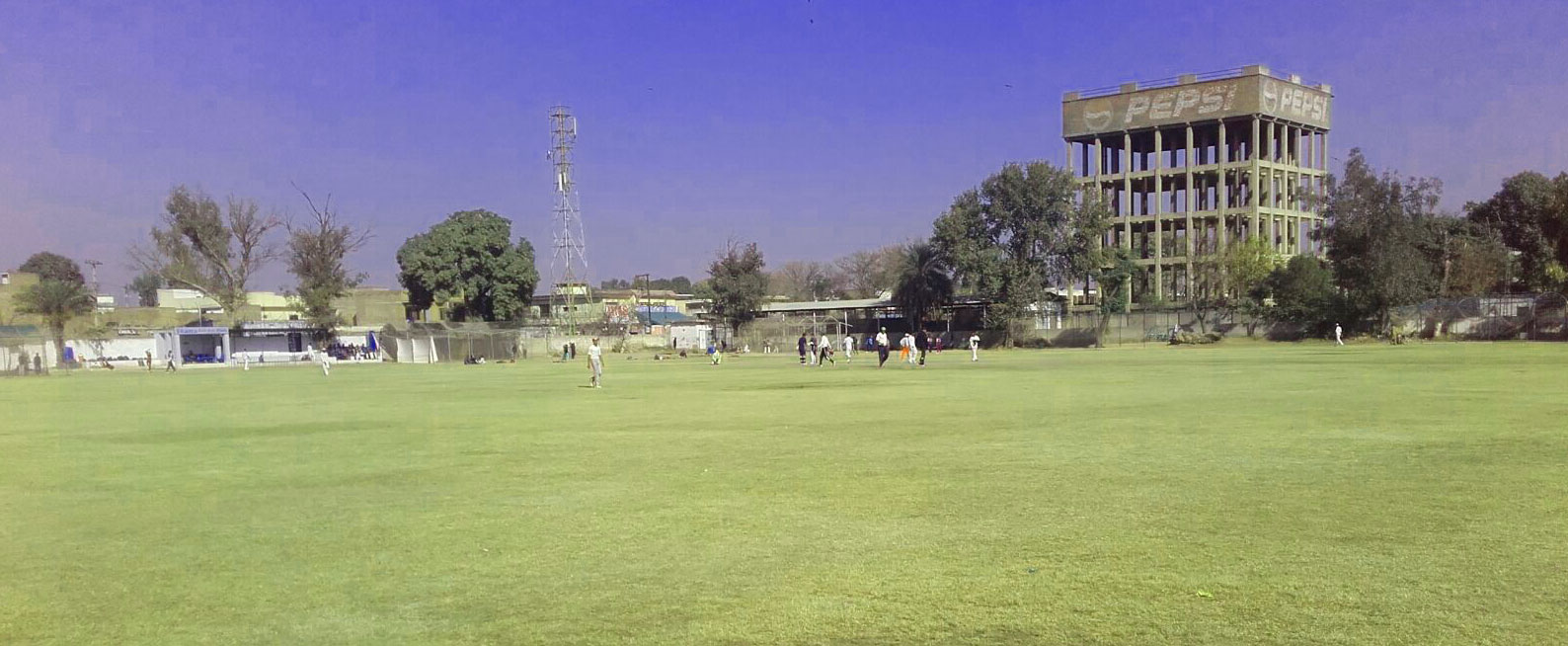
- Peshawar Gymkhana Ground
- Interactive map of Peshawar Gymkhana Ground
- Location: Shahi Bagh, Peshawar
- Country: Pakistan
- Operator: District Cricket Association

Peshawar Gymkhana Ground is a club cricket ground located in Peshawar, the capital of Khyber Pakhtunkhwa province of Pakistan.

== Overview and history ==
Peshawar Gymkhana Ground is located adjacent to Arbab Niaz Stadium in the vicinity of Shahi Bagh in Peshawar. It is an old British Raj-era ground and used to have 2 tennis courts, a pavilion and a cricket ground. The pavilion is named after former Pakistan president Iskander Mirza, who inaugurated it on 10 November 1957. It is very popular among club cricketers and club cricket is regularly played here.

== See also ==
- Arbab Niaz Stadium
- Shahi Bagh, Peshawar
