= Hashtnagri =

- Location within Khyber Pakhtunkhwa Location within Pakistan
- Country: Pakistan
- Province: Khyber-Pakhtunkhwa
- District: Peshawar District
- Time zone: UTC+5 (PST)

Hashtnagri (Pashto: ہشتنگری; pronounce; Urdu: ہشتنگری; pronounce) is a neighbourhood of Peshawar city in the Khyber Pakhtunkhwa province of Pakistan.

== Overview ==
Hashtnagri is located on both sides of Grand Trunk (GT) Road in Peshawar. The most notable attractions of Hashtnagri are Molvi Jee Hospital and City District Women Degree College, which is affiliated with Shaheed Benazir Bhutto Women University Peshawar.

Majority of the people living in Hashtnagri are Pakistani citizens but a sizeable population of illegal Afghans also live here. Most are Muslims, with a small minority being Christians, Hindus and Sikhs. Major languages are Pashto, Urdu, and Hindko.

== Administrative Area ==
Hashtnagri is part of Pakistan National Assembly seat NA- 31(Peshawar-1) while for KP Provincial Assembly it is part of Pk-78 (Peshawar-1).

== Transport ==
Hashtnagri has a bus station that is connected to three different routes.

- BRT route 1
- BRT route 2
- BRT route 8

== Tourist Attractions ==
- Hasht Nagri Gate

== Religious Sites ==
- Panj Tirath, ancient Hindu pilgrimage site
- Hashtnagri Masjid
- Jamia Masjid Ghosia Sarka Faroshan
- Masjid Gulzar Habib
- Masjid Mustafa Ji Baba
- Jamia Masjid Chowk Garhikhana
- Shrine of Shadi Pir
- Gurdwara Bhai Biba Singh

== Educational institutes ==
- Govt Shaheed Asad Aziz High School
- Govt. Shaheed Osama Zafar Centennial Model High School

== See also ==
- TransPeshawar
- Faqeerabad
- Gulbahar Peshawar
