= Shahi Bagh =

Public Park in Peshawar, Pakistan

Coordinates: 34°01′09.1″N 71°34′32.1″E

- Interactive map of Shahi Bagh
- Type: Public recreational park
- Location: Peshawar, Khyber Pakhtunkhwa, Pakistan
- Area: 40 ha
- Operator: Government of Khyber Pakhtunkhwa
- Open: All year

Shahi Bagh (Pashto: شاهي باغ, Urdu: شاہی باغ) is one of the oldest and largest gardens in Peshawar, Khyber Pakhtunkhwa, Pakistan. It is a Mughal-era park located near the Arbab Niaz Cricket Stadium, and has been a hub for political meetings and literary and social gatherings in the city.

== History ==
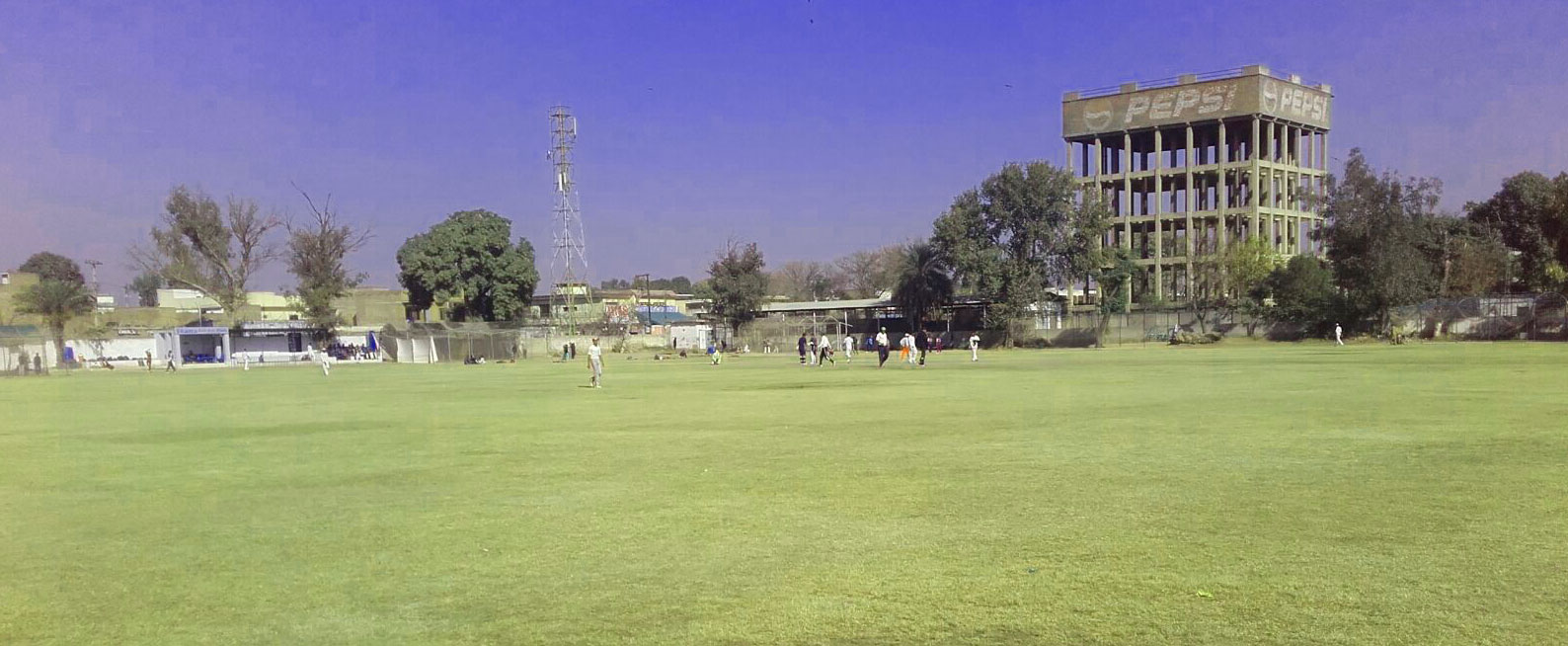
Peshawar Gymkhana Cricket Ground in Shahi Bagh

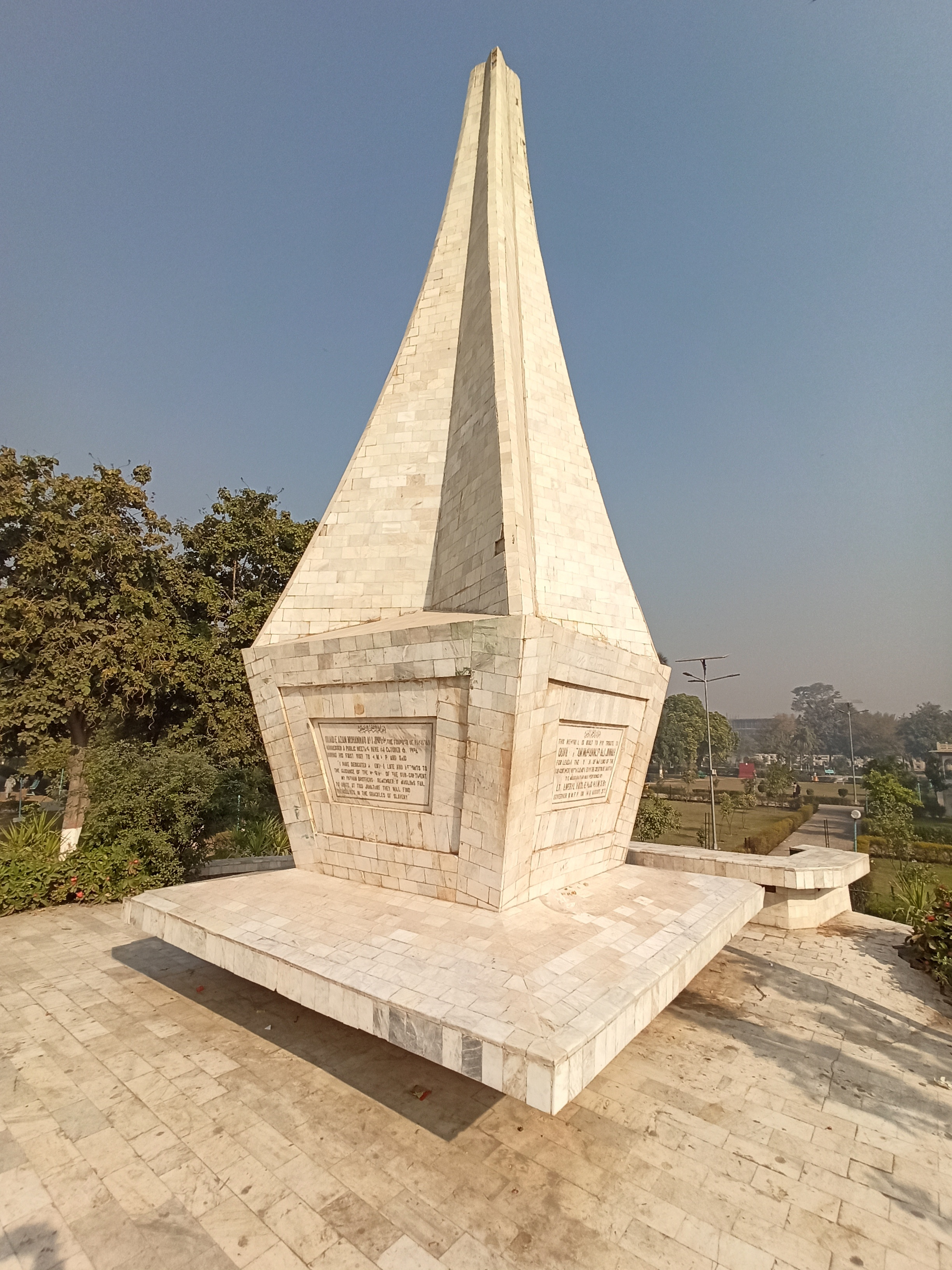
Quaid-e-Azam Monument in Shahi Bagh

Shahi Bagh is located in Faqirabad, Peshawar, and literally means "royal garden". The total area of the park is around 100 acres. It was built during the time of the Mughals.

In August 2009, the ANP-led Government of Khyber Pakhtunkhwa, renovated the Shahi Bagh with the financial support of USAID. In 2012, through applications from social activists and citizens of Peshawar, the Peshawar High Court Chief Justice took notice of its condition, and the government of the province was ordered to remove all the illegally built structures and buildings in the garden to restore it to its original shape.

== Buildings and recreational sites ==
Shahi Bagh currently houses several buildings and recreational sites:

- Arbab Naiz Cricket Stadium
- Government College Peshawar
- Municipal Inter College For Girls, Peshawar
- Pakistan Tennis Club Peshawar
- Parda Bagh and Wedding Hall
- Peshawar Gymkhana Cricket Ground
- Shalimar Garden
- Tehmas Khan Football Stadium Peshawar

== See also ==
- Wazir Bagh
- Army Stadium, Peshawar
- Jinnah Park, Peshawar
