= Wazir Bagh =

Public park in Peshawar, Pakistan

Coordinates: 33°59′46.6″N 71°34′29″E

Wazir Bagh (The Vezir Garden)
- Interactive map of Wazir Bagh (The Vezir Garden)
- Type: Public recreational park
- Location: Peshawar, Khyber Pakhtunkhwa, Pakistan
- Operator: Government of KPK
- Open: All year

Wazir Bagh (Pashto, Urdu: وزير باغ) is an 18th-century garden in Peshawar, Pakistan.

== History ==
It was built by Sardar Fateh Mohammad Khan Barakzai during the rule of Mahmud Shah Durrani. After toppling the rule of Shuja Shah Durrani in Peshawar, Fateh Mohammad Khan laid the foundation of the huge garden in 1810. The garden consists of four enclosures and has a pavilion, mosque, football ground, two spacious lawns, pond along with fountains, and old trees planted in it.

Together with Shahi Bagh, Wazir Bagh is considered one of the oldest and largest gardens in Peshawar. English envoy Sir Alexander Burnes visited it during his trip in 1832. Near the bagh is the Durrani Graveyard that hosts the tombs historical figures such as Mohammad Ayub Khan.

In 2020, the KPK government started refurbishing work in Wazir Bagh and allocated Rs. 100 million under Peshawar revival plan.

== See also ==
- Army Stadium, Peshawar
- Jinnah Park, Peshawar
