= Army Stadium, Peshawar =

Park in Peshawar, Pakistan

Army Stadium Peshawar
- Karnal Sher Khan Shaheed Stadium
- Interactive map of Army Stadium Peshawar
- Former names: Army Stadium Peshawar
- Address: Peshawar Cantonment
- Location: Peshawar, Khyber Pakhtunkhwa, Pakistan
- Coordinates: 34°01′00″N 71°33′02″E
- Owner: Pakistan Army
- Operator: Pakistan Army
- Type: Entertainment and recreational complex
- Public transit: Peshawar Cantonment railway station

Construction
- Opened: 1990s (renamed in 1999)

Army Stadium Peshawar, also known as Karnal Sher Khan Stadium, is located in Peshawar in the Khyber Pakhtunkhwa province of Pakistan. The stadium is owned and operated by Pakistan Army, which is also responsible for its development.

== Overview and history ==
Army Stadium Peshawar is an open entertainment and recreational site in Peshawar, Khyber Pakhtunkhwa, Pakistan. The stadium was renamed to Karnal Sher Khan Shaheed Stadium in 1999, in the memory of Karnal Sher Khan Shaheed, who was martyred in the Kargil War with India.

The stadium has restaurants and takeaways, shopping stalls, music stores, amusement parks and gaming facilities. These facilities have now been shifted to adjacent Sher Khan Shaheed Park Complex. Since December 2016, McDonald's has also started functioning, with the soft launch of the Food Court Complex to house Tutti Fruiti, Nan Bar, Peshawari Baithak and Chaman Ice Cream at the moment.

== See also ==
- Shahi Bagh
- Wazir Bagh
- Jinnah Park, Peshawar
