= Aram Bagh, Agra =

16th century Mughal garden in Agra, India

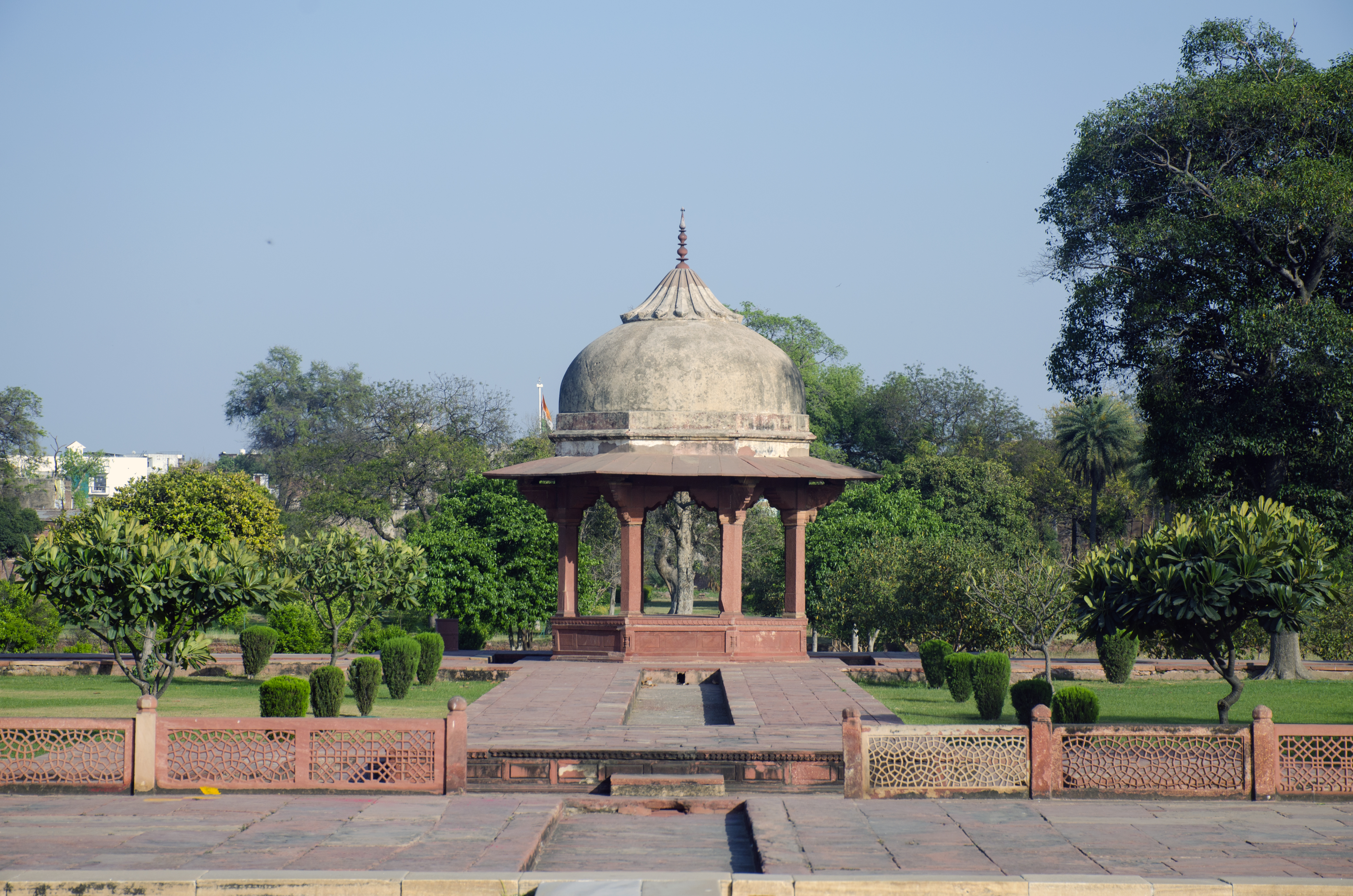
- A chhatri at Aram Bagh, in 2024
- Interactive map of Aram Bagh, Agra
- Type: Botanical garden
- Location: Agra, India
- Coordinates: 27°12′20.347″N 78°2′15.9″E
- Founder: Babur
- Status: Open all year

Monument of National Importance

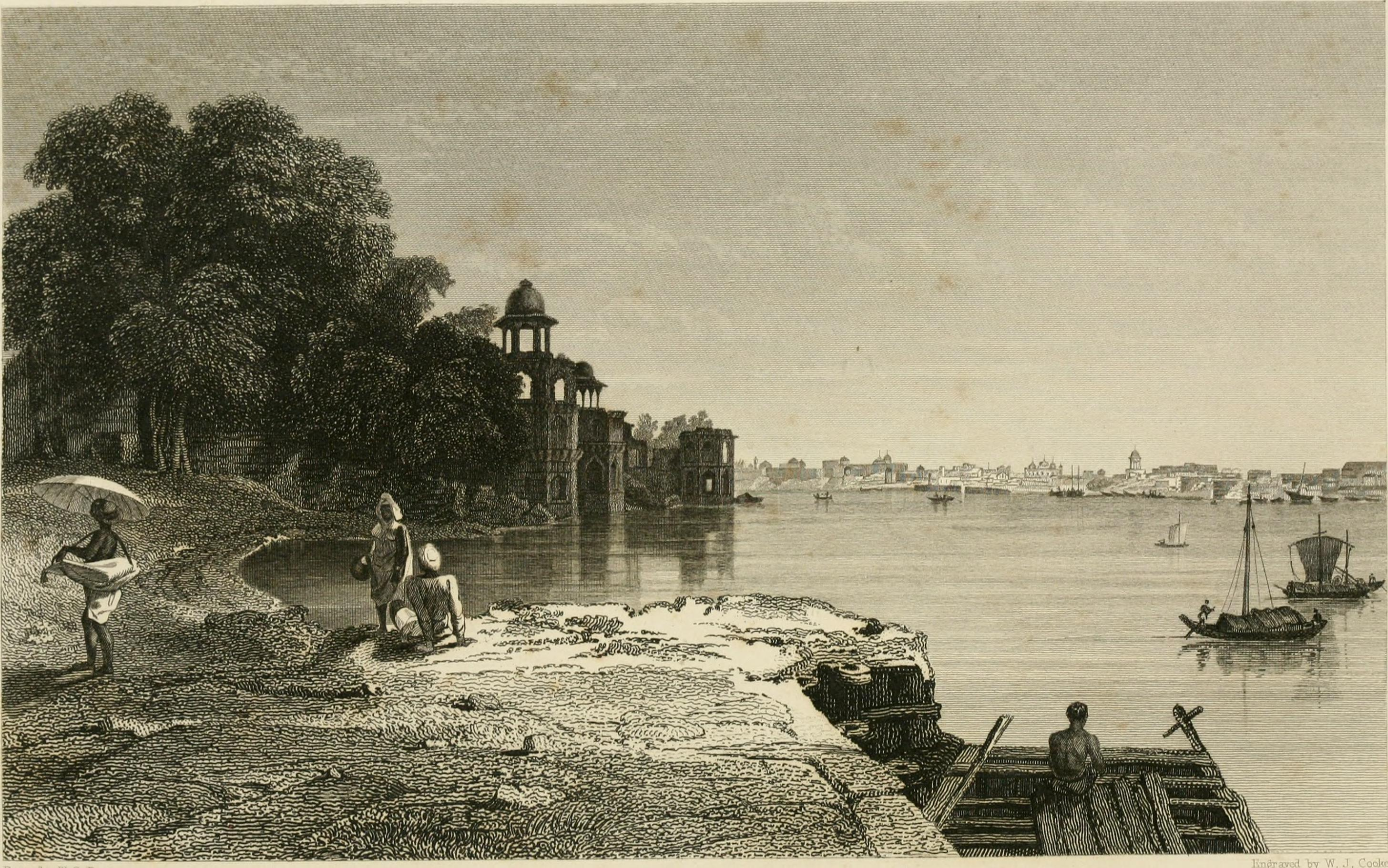
Agra, from the Jahara Baug

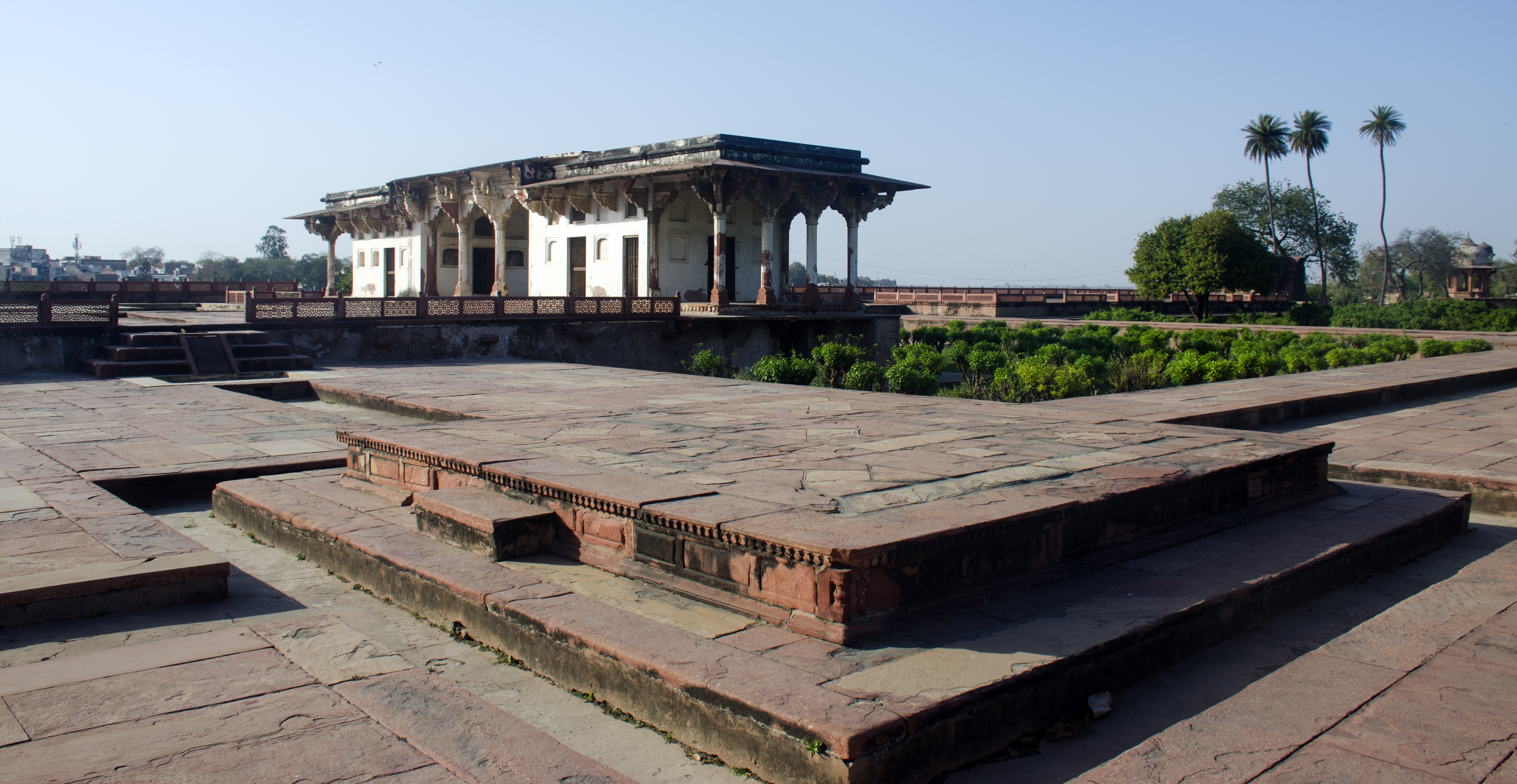
Water channels and pavilion of Aram Bagh

The Aram Bagh is the oldest Mughal garden in India, originally built by Emperor Babur, the first Mughal emperor, in 1526, located about five kilometers northeast of the Taj Mahal in Agra, India. Babur was temporarily buried there before being interred in Kabul.

== Etymology ==
The name Aaram Bagh translates to 'Garden of Rest'.

When Emperor Babur laid out this garden, he named it 'Bāgh-i-Gul Afshān' (lit. 'The Flower-Scatterer Garden'). It was later renamed as Aram Bagh or the 'Garden of Rest'. When the Marathas came to power in Agra between 1774 and 1803, they changed the name from 'Aram Bagh' to 'Ram Bagh', and the name has remained ever since.

It is also variously known as 'Bagh-i Nur Afshan' which translates to 'Light-Scattering Garden', Aalsi Bagh or 'Lazy Garden': according to legend, Emperor Akbar proposed to his third wife, who was a gardener there, by lying idle for six days until she agreed to marry him.

== History ==
The garden is a Persian garden, where pathways and canals divide the garden to represent the Islamic ideal of paradise, an abundant garden through which rivers flow. The Aram Bagh provides an example of a variant of the charbagh in which water cascades down three terraces in a sequence of cascades. Two viewing pavilions face the Jumna river and incorporates a subterranean 'tahkhana' which was used during the hot summers to provide relief for visitors. The garden has numerous water courses and fountains.

Jahangir waited in the garden in early March 1621 for the most astrologically auspicious hour for him to enter Agra after he took the Fort of Kangra. Jahangir made several additions in the garden, which includes two marble pavilions and a number of chhatris. The preserved, surviving architecture dates to his reign and demonstrates the skill of his wife Nur Jahan as a garden designer.

== In art and literature ==
An engraving of Thomas Shotter Boys' painting is in Fisher's Drawing Room Scrap Book, 1835, together with a poetical illustration (The history of Shah Dara's flight and death) by Letitia Elizabeth Landon entitled Jahara Baug, Agra.

== See also ==
- List of parks in Delhi
