= Burj-e-Roshnai =

Coordinates: 33.9919°N 71.5525°E

Burj-e-Roshnai is located in Peshawar, Khyber Pakhtunkhwa province, Pakistan. There are two historical tombs located in Kotla Mohsin Khan, Peshawar, they are called Burj-e-Roshnai. They are one of the great architectural signs of the Mughal dynasty.
