= Jainism in Punjab =

- Jain flag

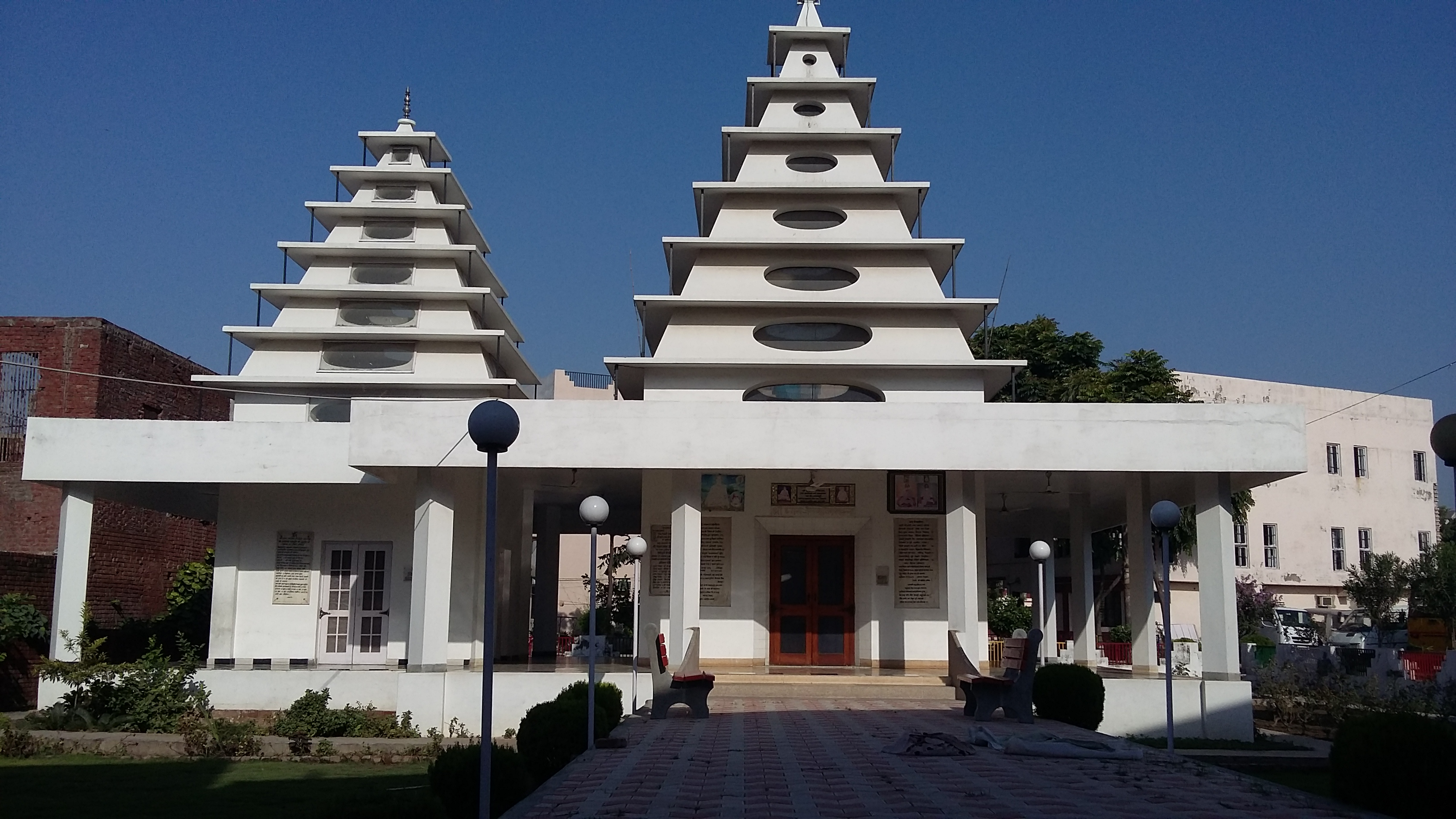
- Jain temple in Khanna, Ludhiana district

Total population
- 45,040 (2011 census)

Religions
- Jainism

Jainism has a long history in the Punjab, with the Śvetāmbara sect being prevalent, especially the Kharataragaccha tradition. The Sthānakavāsī tradition was also active in the region. The Digambaras were historically less influential in the region. The earliest evidence of Jainism comes from Taxila and Sirkap. Traditional Jain lore holds that Mahavira visited a settlement in Punjab. The evolution of local Jainism in the region during the Islamic era is highlighted by the rivalry between the amūrtipūjaka versus mūrtipūjaka factions of Jainism regarding the subject of image-veneration. After the partition of India in 1947, Pakistani Punjab lost its Jain population while many eastward fleeing Jain refugees added to the community's population in Indian Punjab. A caste highly associated with Jainism in the region are the Bhabra, although Punjabi Jains hailed from various caste and communal backgrounds. The religion did not achieve widespread adoption in the Punjab but it was followed in some cities and villages of the region. The Punjabi Jains were sectorally divided into various sects and schools, differentiating from one another by their beliefs and practices.

== History ==
=== Origin ===
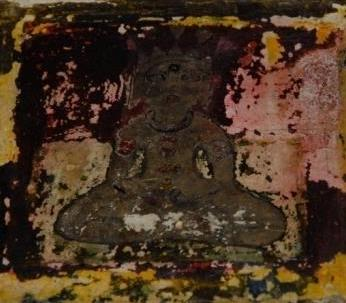
Mural depicting a tirthankar of Jainism, from a Jain temple in Pakistan

Jainism is one of the earliest belief-systems of the Indian subcontinent, based upon the twenty-four tirthankars. According to Jain tradition, Jainism has been present in Punjab since the period of Mahavira. Some claims link Jainism to the Indus Valley Civilization, such as an excavated mound at Harappa that may have uncovered images that are similar to the tirthankars, however this is not conclusive nor ascertained. Archeological finds at Sirkap can trace a Jain presence to the 1st century BCE. Jainism arose in eastern India but diminished in its homeland, instead it took root in western and southern India, where it continued to be practiced. In Punjab, Jainism was an urban religion, being practiced in cities but it was also found in villages.

As per Jain lore, Mahavira visited the site of Bhera in Punjab. A 15th century Jain temple was built at the same location. After this, Mahavira travelled to Gujarat, crossing the Punjab Plain and through Tharparkar district in Sindh. Jain shrines built at Kasur, Lahore, Multan, Sialkot, Bhera, and Jhelum may have commemorated visits by Mahavira to these settlements. A few followers of Mahavira whom were motivated by the principles of non-violence and non-attachment from Punjab and Sindh may have existed during this early-stage of Jain history. Furthermore, Samprati dispatched missionaries the to spread Jain teachings of Mahavira in the region.

The earliest Jain communities seem to have been in Taxila and Tharparkar, before they gradually began settling in different settlements in Punjab and Sindh linked by trade-routes. A Jain community arose in Taksasila, Harappa, Simhapura,Parvatika, Nagarkot-Kangra, Sindhudesa, and Lahore.

=== Ancient period ===
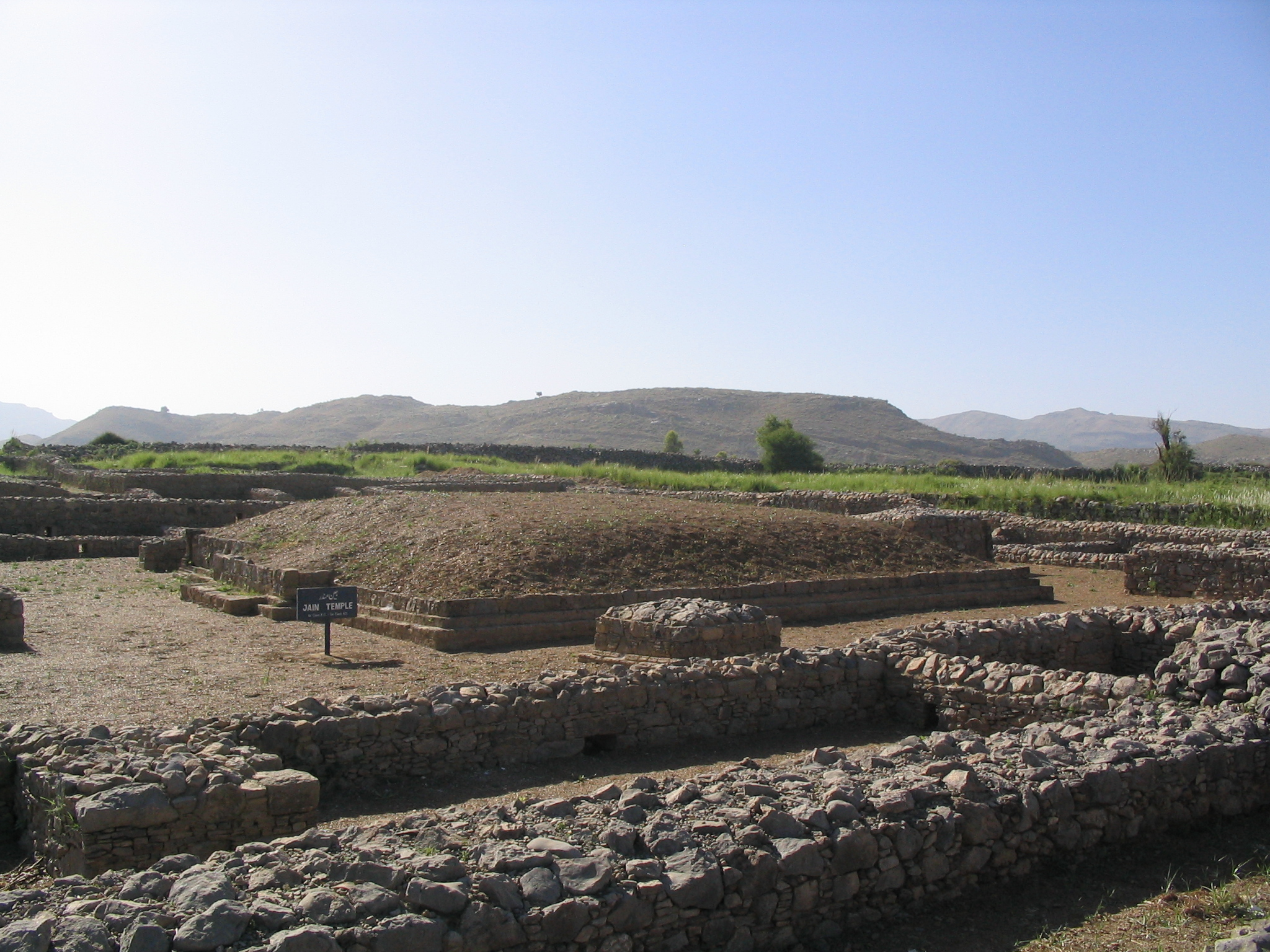
Jain sanctuary uncovered at Sirkap

Taxila was closely associated with Jainism, with the first recorded evidence in Punjab coming from Taxila, as per Hira Lal Dugar. In ancient times, Taxila had a variety of names, such as Shakambhari, Taxila, Kunal Desha, Gajani, Shaki Dheri, Dharamachakara Bhumika, and Chedimastaka.Kailash Chand Jain dates the Jain influence in the Gandhara region (which includes the Taxila area) to the first centuries CE. According to the Jaina tradition, Rishabhanatha, the first Tirthankara, entrusted the region of Ayodhya to his son Bharata and the region of Takshashila to his son Bahubali.

As per canonical Śvetāmbara Jaina texts Āvaśyaka Cūrṇi and Āvaśyaka Niryukti, Tirthankara Rishabhanatha visited Takshashila while wandering after initiation as a monk millions of years ago. Upon learning of his arrival, Bahubali, who was not in the city at that moment, rushed to the city, but the Rishabhanatha had already departed before Bahubali arrived. His footprints were subsequently consecrated by Bahubali who erected a throne and a jewelled dharmachakra ('wheel of the law') over them several miles in height and circumference. The 14th century Vividha Tirtha Kalpa mentions this establishment, stating:

"तक्षशिलायां बाहुबलीविनिर्मितं धर्मचक्रम्॥"
- Ācārya Jinaprabhāsūri in "Vividha Tirtha Kalpa" (p. 85)

As per the canonical Jaina text Mahanishith Sutra, the Dharmachakra Tirtha established by Bahubali is recognized as the abode of Chandraprabha, and Takshashila is also referred to as "Dharmachakra Bhumi," marking its significance as a center of Jainism. The association of Bahubali and Taxila is also found in the Jain text Vividhatīrthakalpa by Jinaprabha.

While there is limited information about the subsequent period, it is noted that during the medieval era, Takshashila faced challenges due to the proliferation of fraudulent ascetics and a lack of proper sustenance, leading to restrictions on Jaina ascetics' wandering in the region, as documented in six ancient Jaina texts known as the Chedasūtras.

Emperor Samprati built a Jaina temple known as "Kunala Stupa" in honor of his father Kunala. During Samprati's rule, the extent of the wandering of Jaina monks developed multifold times, and later also included this region.

According to the Prabhavakacharita, by the second or third century CE, Takshashila had approximately 500 Jaina temples and was home to a significant Jaina population. However, a devastating plague struck the city, leading to widespread death and chaos. The Jaina community sent a Sravaka named Virchand to Nadol, who conveyed their suffering to Acharya Manadevasuri. Suri gave "Laghu Shanti Stava," stating that reciting it would alleviate the plague. Following the recitation, the plague subsided within a few days. However, in the third year, the Turks devastated the city.

According to Acharya Dhaneswarasuri's "Shatrunjaya Mahatmya," Javad Shah, a merchant from Mahuva, renovated Palitana temples in Vikrama Samvat 108. He retrieved an image of Rishabhanatha from Takshashila and established it as the principal deity at the principal shrine amongst Shatrunjaya temples. The Gujarati Jain temple Shatrunjaya has a donation record from one Jadav Shah of Taxila.

During Alexander the Great's campaign and the Greek invasion of the Gandhara region in around the 1st century CE, the Greeks recorded encounters with "gymnosophists". The city of Taxila was noted for containing around a hundred Jain stupas (only one of which was identified by John Marshall). Subsequent excavations at the site have uncovered Jain-linked structures, such as the Chirana Padukas at the Murti temple site in Chakwal district.

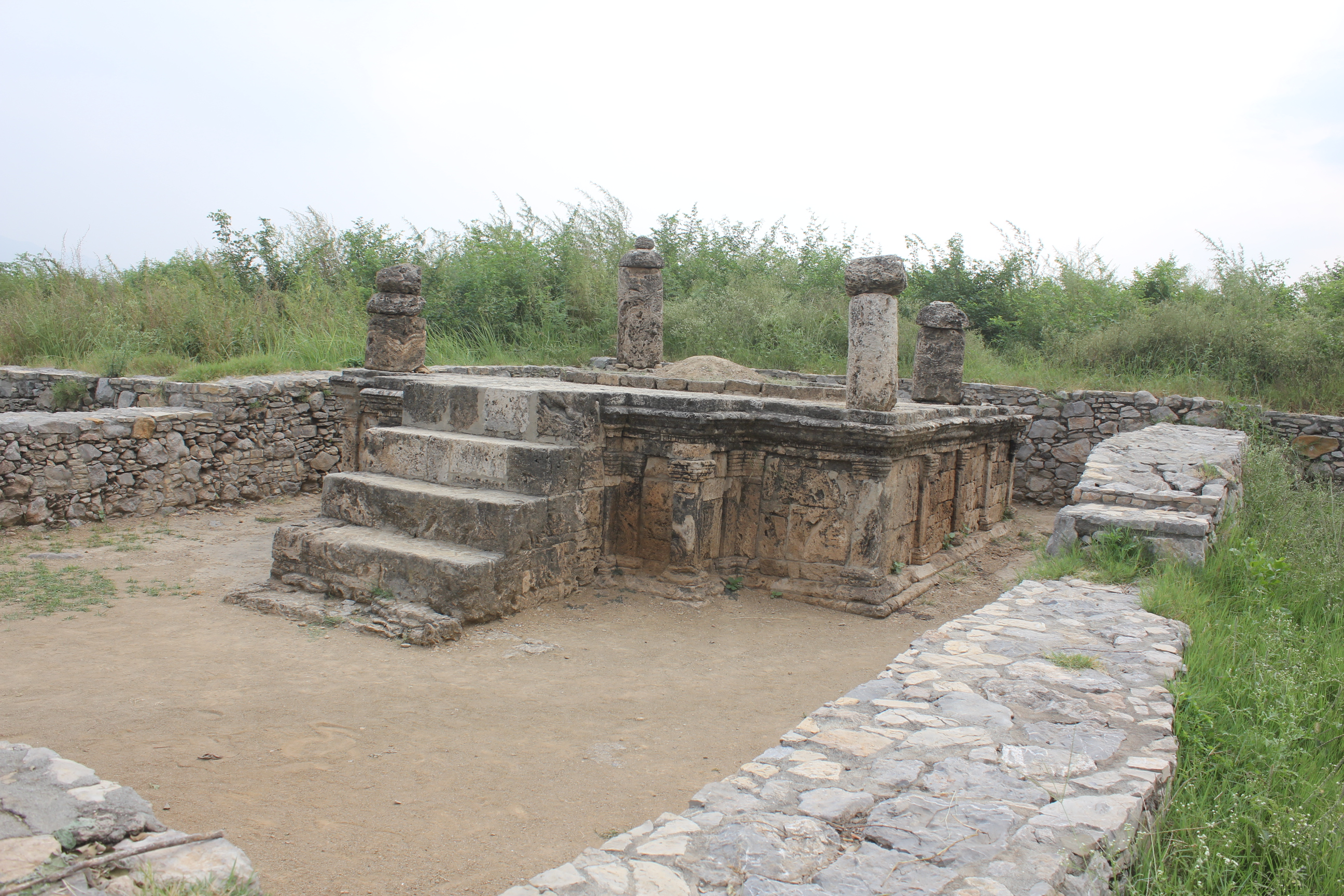
Jain stupa in Sirkap

Excavations in Takshashila support these traditions. John Marshall, the first to conduct systematic excavations at the site, initially thought the newly found Jain structures at Sirkap to be Buddhist until he realized they were architecturally different from the existing Buddhist structures and more similar to the Jain temple (Āyāgapatas) discovered at the Kankali Tila. Marshall noted that Indo-Greek kings displaced the city from its fortified position and settled it in Sirkap during the early years of the second century BCE. The city remained inhabited through the Greek, Shaka, Pahlava, and Kushan periods. Numerous small and large temples have been discovered along the main road of Sirkap. Dr. Marshall concluded that the temples in blocks 'F' and 'G' of Sirkap are Jaina temples due to their architectural similarities with Kankali Tila, a Jaina stupa, found in Mathura. In block 'G,' located on the right side of the main road, numerous ruins of large buildings have been found, characterized by the presence of small temples alongside these structures, which were accessible to devotees. This evidence strongly supports claims by the Jaina tradition that Takshashila was a significant center for Jainism.

A Jain votive tank symbolizing the four elements earth, air, fire and water dating to the 2nd century BCE was discovered at a stupa in Sirkap, now part of the Islamabad Museum's collection. A dancing terracotta female figurine linked to Jainism dated to the 3rd century BCE was uncovered at Bhir Mound in Taxila in January 2026.

There are disputed claims originating from the Divyāvadāna text that the ruler Pushyamitra Shunga killed Jain monks and destroyed their sites at Jalandhar. While Jainism was present in northern Punjab through the 1st to 2nd centuries CE, there is a lack of ancient remains after this point that have been uncovered. However, Jainism remained active in the Tharparkar region of Sindh, whom were linked to the Jain merchants of Gujarat and Rajasthan. As per the Shravanabelagola inscription (1050 Saka era), the Jain monk Sāmantabhadra conducted religious debates in several places, including in Takka (Punjab), during the 2nd century CE. The Jain text Śāntistavana by Manadeva from the 3rd century CE mentions the restoration of Taxila after an invasion by the Turuṣkas. Taxila was believed to have five-hundred Jain temples prior to its destruction in the 6th century CE by Turkic invaders. The Jains of Taxila hid their idols underground during this conflict.

Apart from Taxila and Sirkap, the localities of Opian (connected to ancient Kapisa) in eastern Afghanistan and Katas (in the Salt Range, connected to the ancient Sihapura/Simhapura) in the broader region are also connected to Jainism. The eleventh tirthankar, Śreyāṃsa, is believed to have been born at Simhapura. Jain artefacts, such as statues, were uncovered at Simhapura. The seventh century CE work Varāngacharita mentions Simhapura as being auspicious to Śreyāṃsa. A text known as the Therāvalī refers to the Auḍambarikā śākhā which originated from Rohaṇa. The Auḍambarikā śākhā is linked to the Audumbaras tribe, who inhabited Punjab. As per the Sthirāvalī of the Kalpa-Sūtra, the Majhamika branch of the Jainasaṁgha was founded by the second pupil of Susthita Supratibuddha, Priyagrantha, in the second century BCE. The śrāvakas of the Majhamika branch of the Jainasaṁgha may have shifted from Punjab to Mathura, as per a Kushan inscription from the second century CE recording their presence in Mathura.

Lohacarya (4 BCE – 38 CE), one of the four Jain Pattavalis and 28th guru after Mahavira, settled in Lahore and propagated Jainism in Punjab. He was succeeded by the Suri, the Sethi, and the Bhandara clans.

=== Mediaeval period ===
From the 8th century to the British colonial period, the Jains were active in art, trade, and commerce. Furthermore, Jain temples are found from this period in all the major settlements of Punjab that were linked to trade-routes. Punjab and Sindh formed the region of Sindhudesh, where the Indus river basin was. Jains were present at Multan (which remained a critical site for Punjabi Jainism for centuries), Muzaffargarh, and Sahiwal. They were also inhabiting Malika vahana Pura, Mammana Pura, Maruktta, Droha dotta, Farid Pura (Pak Pattan), Devapala Pura (Dipalpur), Bhera, Dera Ghazi Khan, Kohat, Bannu, and Mianwali. Jain also existed at Lahore, which Jain texts call Labhapura. Jainism in Punjab had regional links to Gujarat and Marwar. Jain idols dating to the 8th and 9th centuries CE have been discovered in Punjab. The settlement of Pavvaiyā (most likely located in Punjab on the bank of the Chenab river), where the capital of Toramana was, is recorded as being home to many Jain scholars and monks as per the Kuvalaya-mālā text by Uddyotana-sūri from the 7th century CE. Toramana was a disciple of Harigupta of the Gupta family.

Chinese monk Xuanzang records meeting Jain monks from both the Digambara and Svetambara sects while travelling in the Punjab in the 7th century. During his travels in Kapisa, which is now eastern Afghanistan, he recounted coming upon naked ascetics. At Simhapura (claimed to be Katas/Kataksa in Jhelum by Alexander Cunningham, now Chakwal district), he came upon a stupa that had been constructed by Ashoka. Hiralal Dugar links these observations to Jain sramana and shravak and Jain temples and stupas. At the proposed site of Simhapura in Katas, Aurel Stein discovered a Jain temple in 1889 near Murti. All the items excavated (idols and relics), a large sum, are now part of the Central Punjab Museum's collection. Another early-mediaeval Jain site was at Parvatika/Pavvaiya on the bank of the Chenab (Candrabhaga) river, which may have been another name for the Huna capital Sakala of Toramana. The Huna capital may now be located in Sialkot and Sangla Hill, with the Jain site possibly being near Pabbu Hills. A Jain figure from this time linked to Parvatika who may have royal origin was Harigupta, whom was the teacher (guru) of Toraraya. Old Jain structures, inscriptions, and artwork has also been found at Kangra, such as in its namesake fortress (Kot Kangra, which contains temples dedicated to Adinatha), and at Nagarkot (capital of Trigarta). Near the Indreshwar temple in Kangra Bazaar are the remains of Jain statues, one of which depicts Parsvanatha and has an impartially surviving and damaged Sharada inscription that dates it to either 1154 or 1254 CE (year 30 of Lok-Kala). An earlier Kangra inscription from 854 CE makes mention of two Jain saints, belonging to Rajakula gaccha (Rajagaccha), Sūri Amalacandra (pupil) and Abhayacandra Sūri (teacher). A person named Siddharāja is described as being the student of Sūri Amalacandra, with this person having a son named Dhaṅga, who in-turn had a son named Caṣṭaka, who had a wife named Ralhā. The couple Caṣṭaka and Ralhā had two sons named Kuṇḍalaka and Kumāra who are attributed to constructing an idol of the tirthankar Pārśvanātha. A Kashmiri sravaka named Ratna (Rayana) built a Maṇibimba of Neminātha at Raivataka in 932 CE. The early Muslim rulers of Delhi employed Digambar Jains of Kangra as their local diwan. The Jain text Vijn͂aptitriveṇī about a pilgrimage to Nagarkot from Faridpur on the southern-bank of Vipasa (Beas river) makes references to the conflict between Jasrat Khokhar (Yasoratha) and Sikandar Shah Miri. In around 1000 CE, invading Islamic armies led to Jain, Buddhist, and Hindus burying and hiding their scriptures and idols for their protection.

During the early Muslim, Sultanate, and Mughal periods, Jainism in what is now Pakistan was mostly confined to Sindh. The main Jain tradition in the region was the Kharataragaccha tradition. Jinadattasuri (1075–1154) the first dadaguru of the Kharataragaccha tradition won converts in Sindh. Jinadattasuri also introduced the practice of paňchanada puja, veneration of Punjab's symbolic five rivers. Local lore claims the Jain of the Punjab region in their quest to become affluent were advised by Jinadattasuri to venerate the idol of the yakṣa Mani Bhadra from Bhatner underwater, with this event becoming the Paňchanada festival. Multan was also a key centre of Jainism, with the Komala gaccha and Kharataragaccha being present though they were antagonistic with one another. Jinadattasuri spent the rainy season (cāturmāsa) in Multan in VS 1169 (c. 1112–1113 CE). The second dadaguru, Acharya Jinchandra Suri converted many to Jainism in the Taxila region in 1280 VS (c. 1223–1224 CE). Two years later in 1282 VS (c. 1225–1226 CE), Acharya Siddha Suri also conducted missionary work in the Taxila region. The local Taxila congregation consisted of a hundred households, composed primarily of Oswal Jains of Rajasthani origin. The Jain merchants that settled west of the Rann of Kutch came under its influence due to the missionary work of Jinakuśalasūri (1280–1332). The dādābāṛī of Jinakuśalasūri conducted missionary work in Halla, Multan, Dera Ghazi Khan, Lahore, Narowal, and other places. At Tharparkar in Sindh, the tradition of Jinakuśalasūri became the dominant Jain school of thought. Amongst the Digambaras of Punjab, the Kasthasamgha tradition was pravelent, especially amongst the Agrawalas.

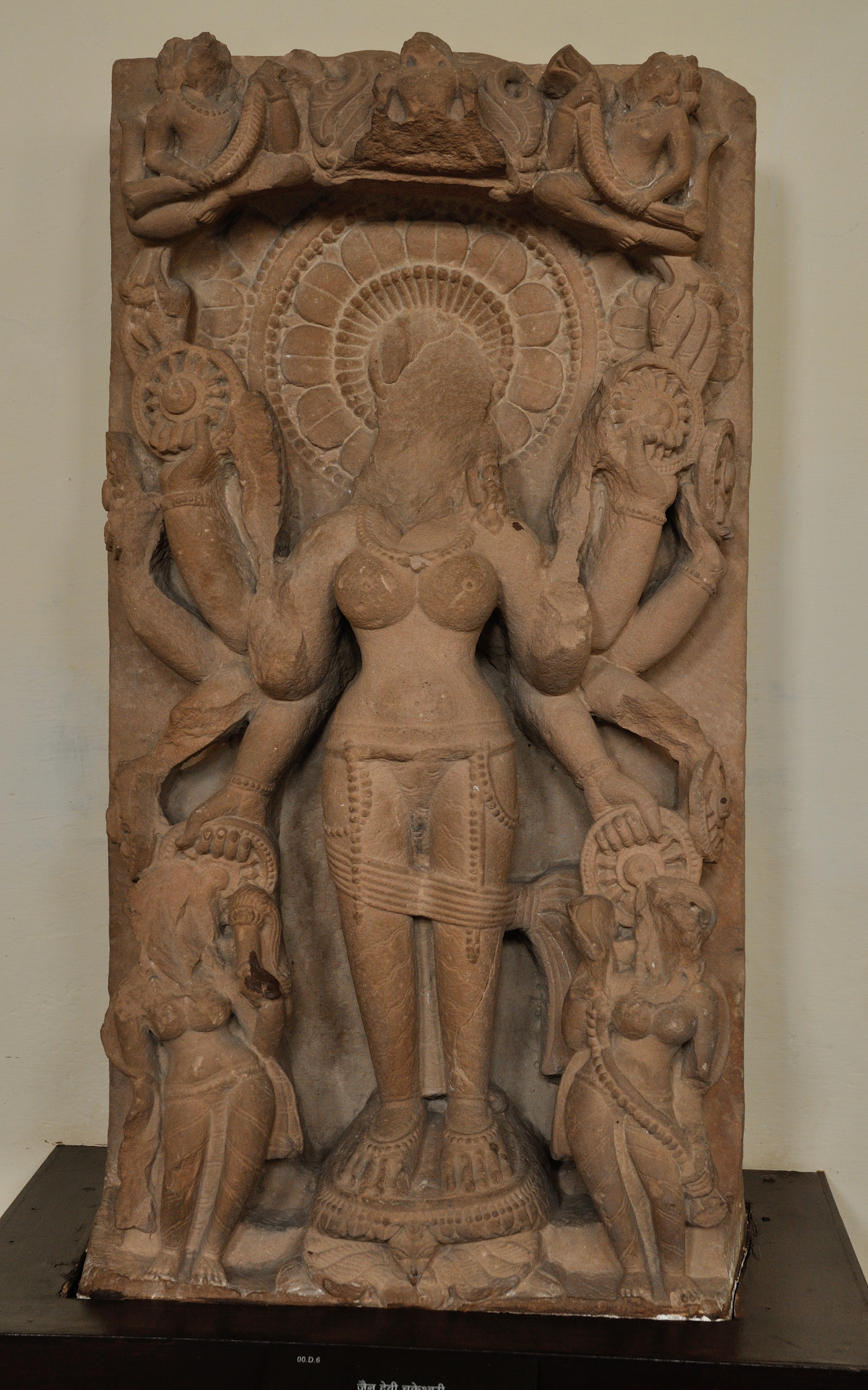
Statue of the Jain goddess Chakreshwari, excavated from the Kankali Tila in Uttar Pradesh, circa 10th century CE

Sirhind (also spelt Sarhind) has a long history and association with Jainism as a site of pilgrimage for their Uttarapath. In Jain texts, the settlement is known as Sinhnad. An old Jain temple dedicated to the deity Mata Chakreshwari Devi (the shasan devi [ruling deity] of Rishabh Dev) can be found in Sirhind. For the origin of the temple, lore claims a Jain congregation (sangh) of Khandelwal (Khandela) took a trip from Madhya Pradesh to Kangra to commemorate Adinatha's visit. Along with them they brought the pindi (circular stone fragment) of their hereditary deity Chakreshwari, who communicated to the congregation in a dream-message that she wished to be left at the spot now marked by the Mata Chakreshwari Devi temple in Sirhind, Punjab and its idol of the goddess. As per Kalhana's Rajatarangini, Samana was also an important place of the Uttarapath pilgrimage route, where the sangh would stay. At Samana, an old Jain temple known Shanti Nath Jain Śvetāmbara Mandir can be found, which contains an idol of the first tirthankar Bhagwan Rishabh Dev dating to VS 1307 (1250 CE), originally housed at an older, nearby temple no longer extant. Faridkot was the site of an upāśrayas and gaddi belonging to the yatis of the Khartargaccha tradition, who built the Śvetāmbara Jain temple there that contained an idol of Arishtanemi. The Vrihattapa gaccha maintained a gaddi in Rupnagar, their leader in 1686 CE was Yati Premavijayji. The Khartar gaccha had a gaddi in Multan.

Jains became prevalent in Lahore during the reign of Akbar, who had founded a syncretic religion and corresponded with a Jain named Hiravijaya Suri. Akbar also kept a company of Jain monks with his entourage when they travelled to Kashmir, such as Khush Faham. During Akbar's reign, the Jain temples at Said Mitha Bazar and Tharhiyan Bhabrian in Lahore were constructed. Also during Akbar's reign, many Jains originally from Marwar began moving and settling in Punjab's towns and cities, with Jain yatis (priests) establishing upāśrayas and ḍerās at places where Jain congregations were living. The Jain official Karam Chand, originally a Bania from Bikaner in Rajasthan, left the service of a local Bikaner ruler and shifted to Lahore, working as a treasurer (Bhānḍāri) for the Mughals. Karam Chand founded a Jain shrine at his habitation south of Lahore near Guru Mangat, with a settlement based on it coming to be known as Bhabra. Karam Chand Bachhawat, whom was an Osavāla Jain, was able to facilitate meetings at Lahore between emperor Akbar and the fourth dādāguru Jinacandrasūri VI (1541–1613) in 1592, 1593, and 1594. Jinacandrasūri disembarked from Multan (Mūlasthāna) and Uch (Uccapuri) in 1595 to visit the samadhi of Jinakuśalasūri in Derawar. After this visit, he returned to Rajasthan. Due to Islamic influence and pressure, the image-venerating faction of Jainism (mūrtipūjaka), such as the Kharataragaccha tradition, declined in the region and the non-image-venerating faction (amūrtipūjaka) became popular. The vaars of the Sikh writer Bhai Gurdas mentions the Bhabra Jains, with some of the references being kaytarhiaan hee baaneeay kitarhay Bhaabhariaan suniaaray ("the people of Bhabra were traders and goldsmiths") and Bhabray toon andi ik muttayyar nachdi.

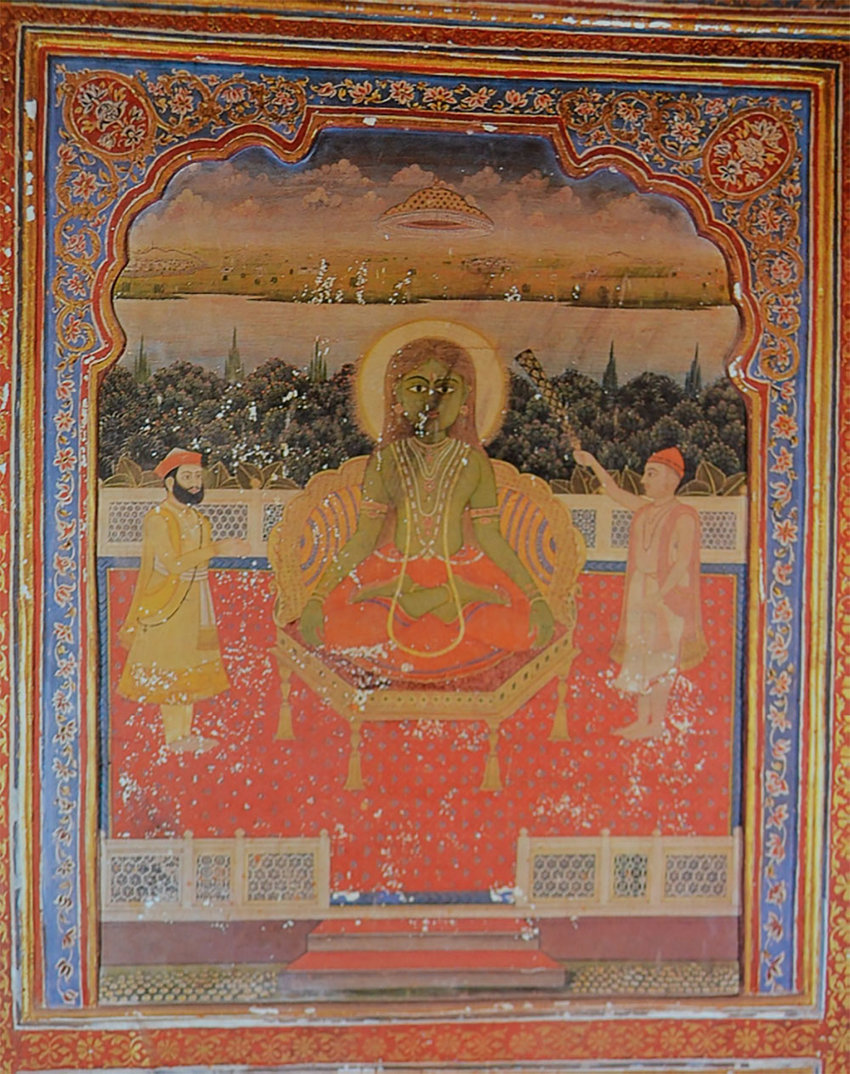
Mural of the 23rd tirthankar, Parsvanath, at the Shish Mahal, Qila Mubarak, Patiala, Punjab, ca.1845–1862

A Gujarati Jain who was an amūrtipūjaka named Lonkā Šāh or Loṅkāgaccha shifted from Gujarat to Lahore and founded the Lāhaurī- or Uttarārdha Loṅkāgaccha (which the Sthänakvāsī and Terāpanthins derive from). In 1451, Lonkā Šāh opposed the chaityavasi (temple-dwelling monks) and believed there was a degeneration occurring in the Jain monkhood, motivating his reforms based upon practicality (using logic and epistemology), and he did not place as much importance on veneration of the tirthankars or jinas. Loṅkāgaccha's reformist group became dominant in Punjab in the 16th century, founding a gaddīs (seats) in Lahore, Jandiyala Guru, Phagvara, Nakodar, Ludhiana, Patti, Samana, Malerkotla, Patiala, Sunam, Ambala, Kasur, among other settlements. The sixth leader of this group, Yati Saravā, initiated the monks Rāyamalla and Bhallo, who were active in the Punjab between 1503 and 1551. Raimalla and Bhalloo arrived in Lahore, Punjab from Gujarat in 1503, being proponents of the Lahori Uttarardh Lonkā gaccha, which over time spread around Punjab in the following period. The sect founded gaddies (seats/centres) in various settlements and built Jain Upāśrayas and Jain Śvetāmbara temples. They also created idols of the tirthankars for the Punjabi congregations to venerate. This sect became the most popular Jain tradition in northern Punjab between the 17th and 18th centuries. Lava Ji introduced the mukha-vastrika practice amongst the Lahori Uttaradha gaccha after him finding Dhundhaka Mata in 1709 VS (c. 1652–1653), with adherents of this branch being known as Dhundhia. This group was introduced to Punjab in VS 1731 (c. 1674–1675), via Haridas, with practitioners being affiliated with the Sthankavasis.

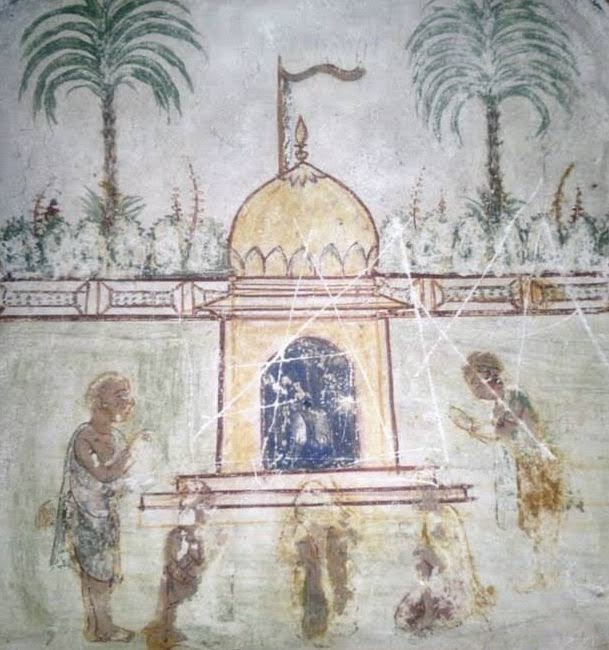
Mural depicting a scene of veneration at a Jain shrine, from a Jain temple in Rasool Nagar, Punjab, Pakistan

The image-venerating faction of Jainism later experienced a revival in the Punjab via yatis, with this faction establishing temples at Ramnagar (Rasulnagar), Gujranwala, Sialkot, Pinda Dadan Khan, or Papanakha. Due to the reintroduction of image veneration, an orthodox monk named Haridāsa split between 1673 and 1693 from the Uttarārdha Loṅkāgaccha and became aligned with the Ḍhūṇḍhaka (Sthānakavāsī) tradition of Lavajī, Gujarat, leading to the foundation of an amūrtipūjaka reformist organization in Lahore, Punjab known as the Pañjāb Lavajī Ṛṣi Saṃpradāya. Eventually, the Uttarārdha Loṅkāgaccha organization was absorbed by the under the leadership of Ācārya Amarasiṃha (1805–1881), allowing the Pañjāb Lavajī Ṛṣi Saṃpradāya to become the most popular and dominant Jain tradition in the Punjab. The Pañjāb Lavajī Ṛṣi Saṃpradāya recruited from the Brahmin, Rajput (Kshatriya), Aggarwal, Jatt, and Bhabra communities, also from the lower-castes. Digambara Jains were generally not found northwest of Ambala. Man Singh I invited Jains from Rajasthan to settle in Pasrur in the Punjab during Mughal times, with these Jain settlers becoming weavers, creating and selling textiles. A famous Jain of Pasrur was Baba Dharam Dass, whom may have been a descendant of the original Oswal Jain zamindar that Man Singh invited to settle in the Pasrur region, whom recruited agriculturalists from his Rajasthani homeland to move there. The samadhi shrine of Dharam Dass near Deoka/Degh, Pasrur became one of the two most sacred Jain sites in Pakistan, alongsite the shrine of Vijayānandasūri. The Duggar lineage of Oswal Jains claim Dharam Dass as an ancestor.

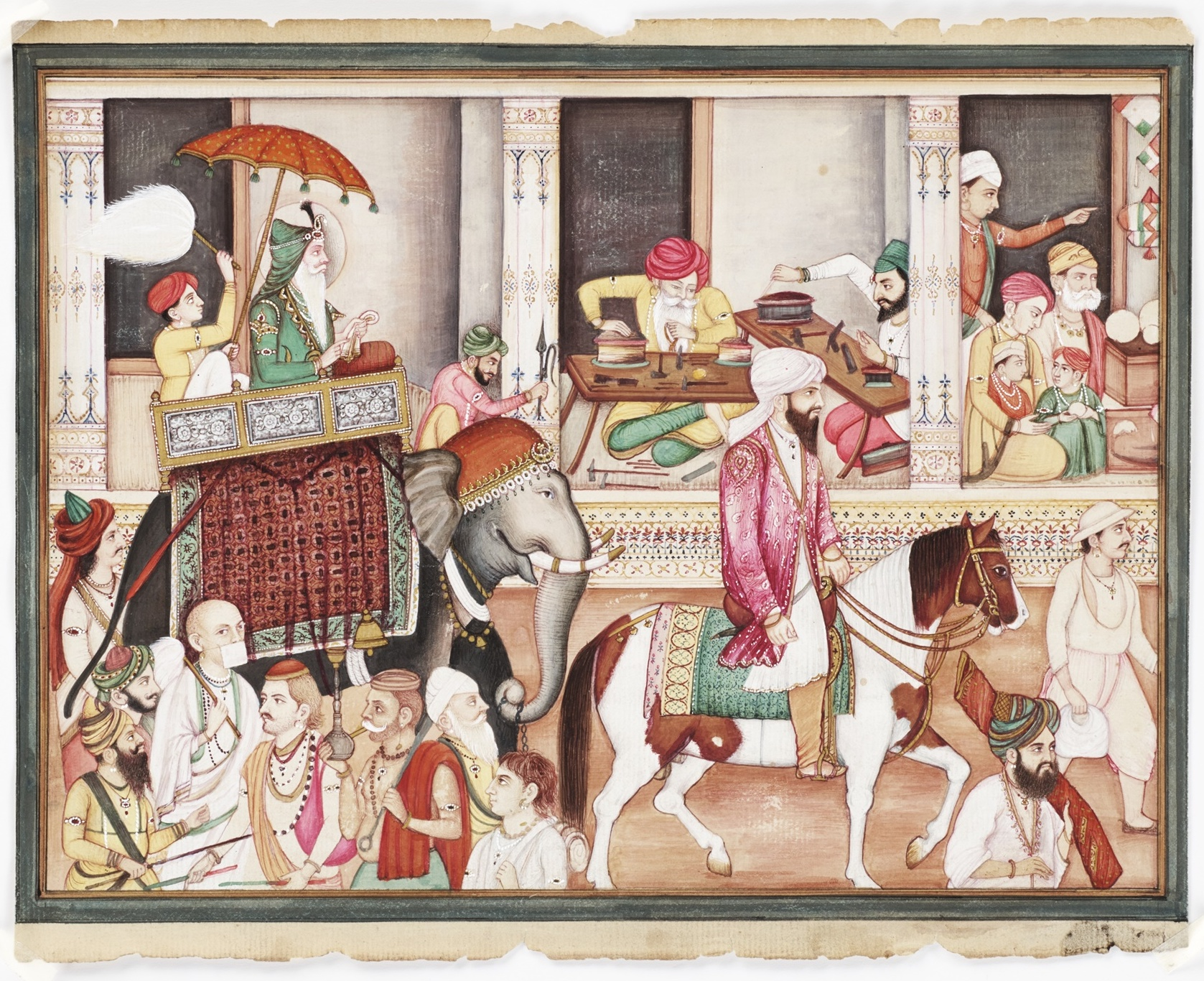
Painting of Maharaja Ranjit Singh in a bazaar, with a Jain monk at the bottom-left

During the Sikh period, Jains were a fundamental part of the local economy via their role as merchant, being heavily involved in the cloth, grains, general merchandise, jewelry, and banking trades. Vimal Chand was bestowed the shripujya title in Hayavatpur (home then to a shravaka community, now located in Patti, Amritsar district) in VS 1871 (1814 CE). Shripujya Vimal Chand then assigned certain individuals to preach in different areas and manage the congregations there. Three of his acaryas were women yatis. The yatis of the sangh were strictly mandated to preach and live in only their designated areas of jurisdiction, at-risk of punishment. Rishis whom obeyed the borders were considered loyal to the Chaturvedi Dharmsangh. The occasion of Ramchandra's ascension as shri-puja occurred in Amritsar.

=== Colonial period ===
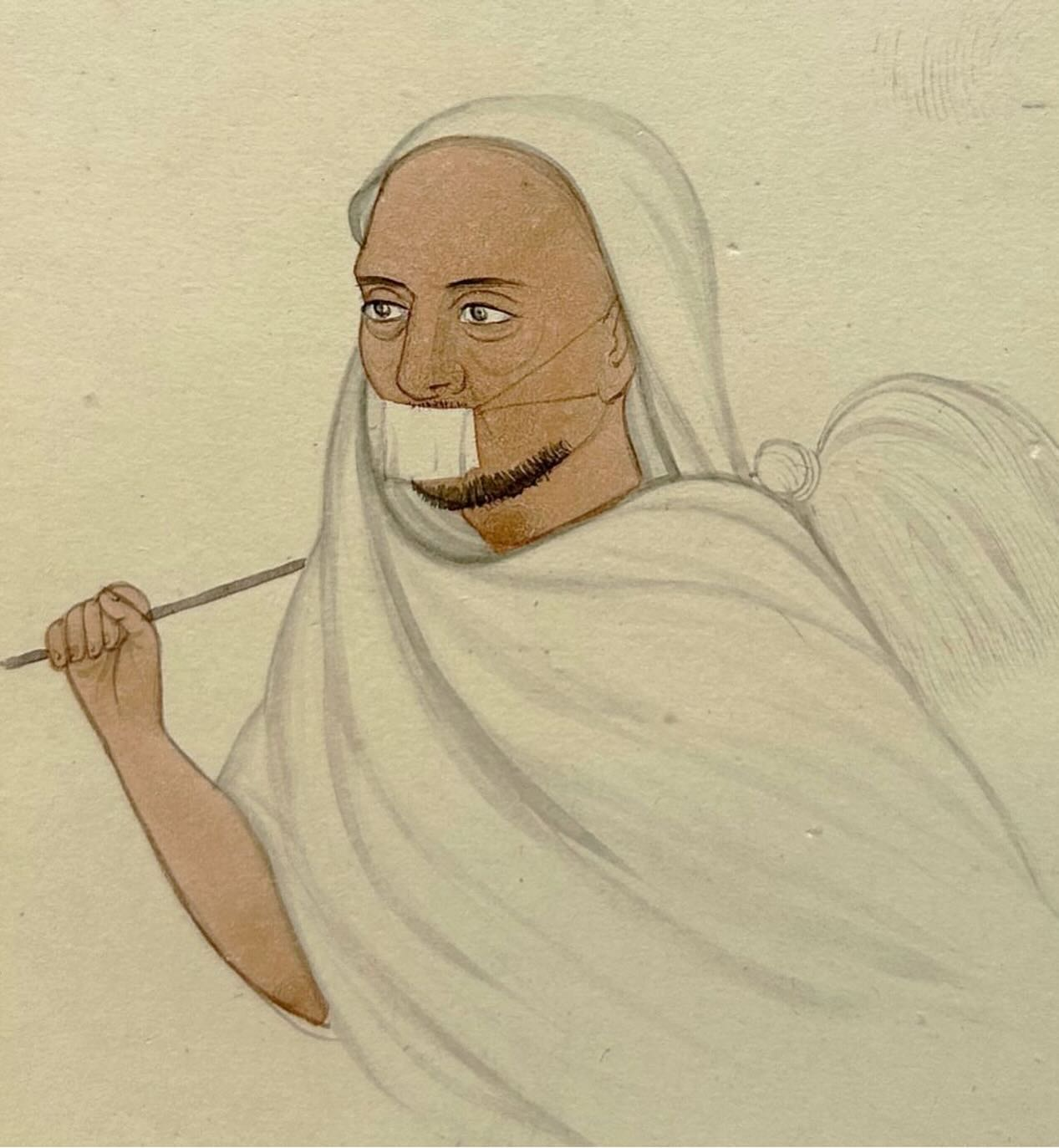
Detail of a painting of a Jain monk, by Kapur Singh, Punjab, ca.1860–65

The introduction of railways and more roads under British-rule allowed the Jains to spread further in the Punjab and, settling in places along trade routes. In-regards to caste, in West Punjab the Śvetāmbara Jains usually hailed from the Osavāla caste while in Sindh they usually belonged to the Poravāḍa and Śrīmālī castes. Despite the Punjabi Osavālas, who called themselves Bhābaṛās, having a Rajasthani origin, they gradually lost touch with their homeland and adopted Punjabi as their mother-tongue (also using Urdu and Persian) and stopped marrying Osavālas from Rajasthan. These Bhāvaṛā/Bhābaṛās were prevalent in mercantile, finance, education, and publishing fields, with many locations (such as villages, bazaars, and mohallas) being named after them in Pakistan. The organizations of the Bhabras controlled most of the Jain heritage sites in Pakistan prior to partition. Apart from the Bhabras, other Jain castes/communities were from Brahmin, Rajput, Aggarwal, Jatt, and lower-caste origin.

Digambara Jains were generally not found in the Punjab but due to them supplying the British military, some communities of Aggarwal (Agravālas) followers of the Terāpanth tradition arose in the cantonment sections of Rawalpindi, Sialkot, Lahore, and Karachi. A Digambar bhaṭṭāraka seat was also found in Multan. Between 1855 and 1875, another spilt in the Punjabi Jain community occurred when sixteen mendicants of the Ludhiana-based Sthānakavāsī Gaṅgārāma Jīvarāja Saṃpradāya and joined with an amūrtipūjaka tradition of Tapāgaccha from Gujarat. The Jain leaders of the most popular Punjabi branch of the Tapāgaccha, known as the Vallabha Samudāy, were Buddhivijaya (Sthānakavāsī name: Būṭerāya, 1806–1882), Vijayānandasūri or Ātmānanda (Sthānakavāsī name: Ātmārāma, 1836–1896), and Panjāb Kesarī Vijayavallabhasūri (1870–1954). The Vallabha Samudāy were fundamental in ensuring the survival of Jainism in Punjab during the colonial-period, where there were rival religious groups, such as Christian missionaries and the Arya Samaj, generating a revival of Jainism in the region through the construction of new temples.

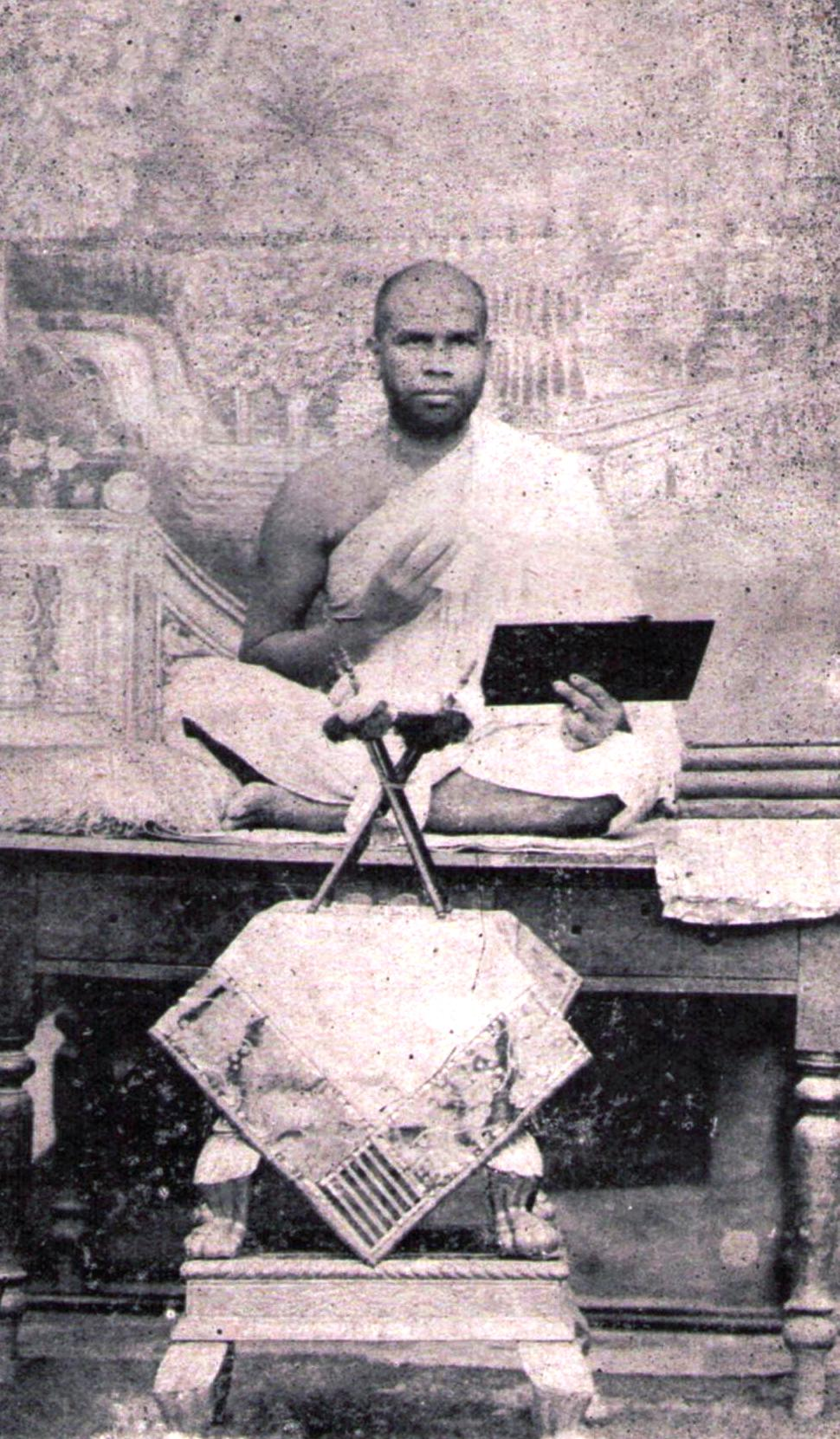
Photograph of Punjabi Jain leader Vijayānandasūri of the Vallabha Samudāy

Critical to this Punjabi Jain revival was the monk Vijayānandasūri, who revived image-veneration in Punjabi Jain society, which had been sidelined for a long time. Many Jains were becoming Sikhs, Arya Samajis, or Christians, especially amongst the Oswal and Aggarwal. Furthermore, the Jain philosophy and identity was being criticized. Vijayānandasūri wrote the books Tattva-darsha, Ajnana Timira Bhaskara, and Tattva Nirnaya Prāsād, to articulate his view of Jainism. He travelled around Punjab, Marwar, Mewar, Kathiawar, and Gujarat to lecture and preach on the religion, promoting service of the Shasan and not remaining confined to upāsarās. He pushed to have bhandars (Jain libraries) of the Swetambar Jains in Rajasthan and Gujarat more accessible to others (which had been locked away due to earlier fears of Muslims destroying Jain works and blocking Western academic access), rather than remaining inaccessible and pershing due to being eaten by worms, with the manuscripts being indexed and copied to save the works. He invited orientalist scholars, such as Rudolf Hoernle, to study these works so they could obtain a better understanding of the Jain religion rather than an incomplete conceptualization. Due to the influence of Christian missionaries, the image-venerating faction of Jainism was diminishing in Punjab, which the monk thought was "suicidal" for the Jains. Vijayānandasūri revived image-veneration (as murti puja) by promoting it as a means of concentration and self-realization. Several temples were built and repaired during his time. He also enacted reforms amongst the Jain clergy and shed what he perceived to be Brahminical practices that had crept in amongst their ranks. He disliked how the Oswals, Aggarwals, and Khandelwals refused to eat together or intermarry with one another despite all being Jains, so he promoted more cordial relations between the groups.

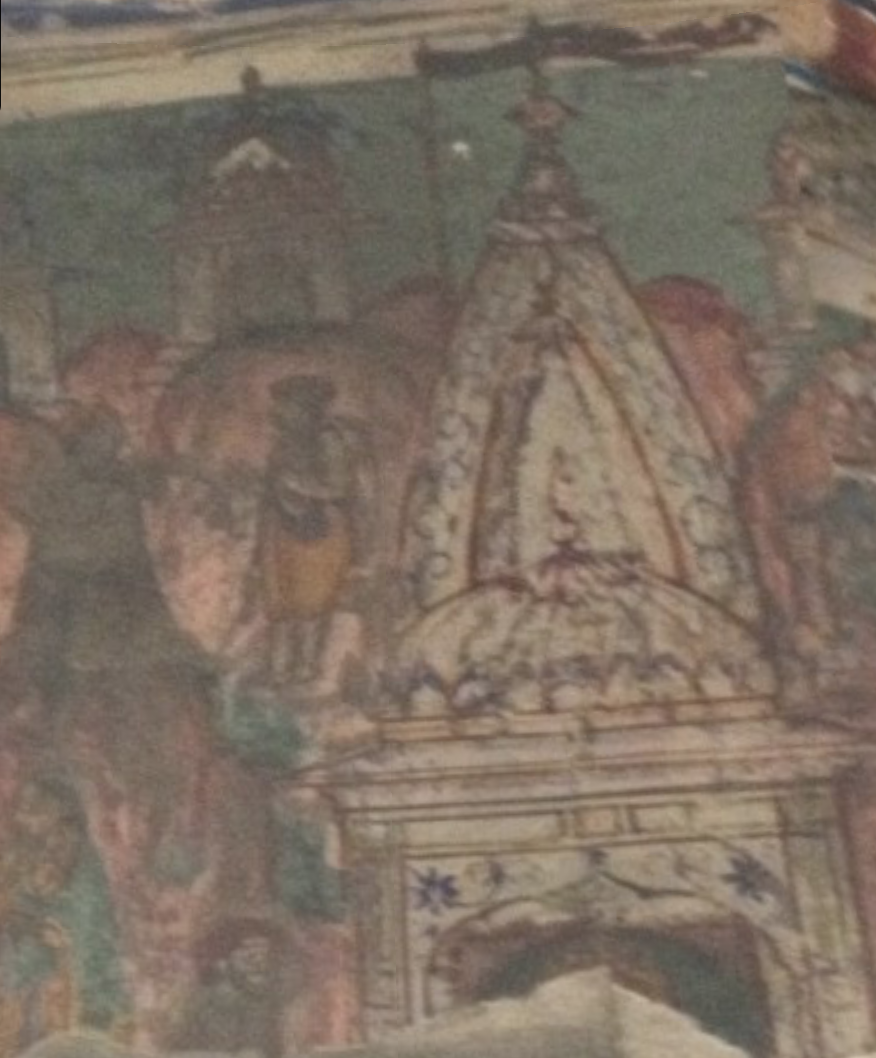
Mural depicting a Jain temple, from a Jain temple in Rasool Nagar, Punjab, Pakistan

The Loṅkā tradition (Uttarārdha Loṅkāgaccha) was disappearing around this time, so its former temples were re-purposed by the followers of the Vallabha Samudāy. Meanwhile, the Sthānakavāsī tradition rejected any construction of new temples and halls, as they viewed this as being "violent" and against their tenets, preferring empty rooms or buildings, but they also began taking over former Loṅkā sites in the late 19th century. In the 20th century, the yati traditions in Punjab began declining due to them getting married and having families, turning Upāśrayas into their own residences, and not maintaining Jain literature as they destroyed works or gave them out for free.

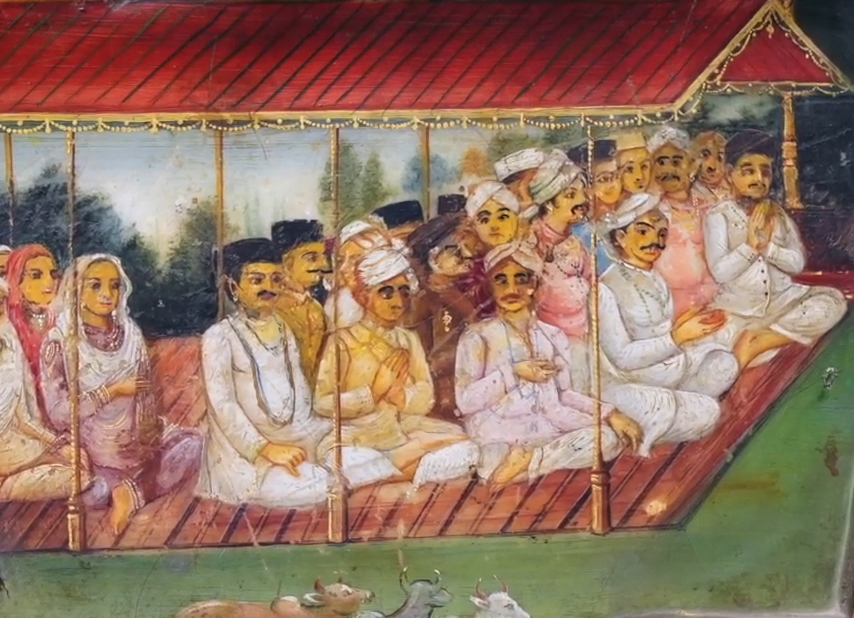
Jain congregation, detail of a Tirath-Pata (pilgrimage map) of Shatrunjaya, from a Jain temple in Gujranwala, Punjab, Pakistan, 1941

In Rawalpindi in the 1930s, a Jain named Muni Khazāncan of the Pañjāb Saṃpradāya (Pañjāb Lavajī Ṛṣi Saṃpradāya), supported by Pañjāb Kesarī Ācārya Kāśīrām (1884–1945), began a movement against the Sthānakavāsīs by promoting the construction of new religious schools and libraries (sthānakas), starting first in Rawalpindi with his movement spreading later to Gujranwala, Jhelum, Kasur, Lahore, Sialkot, Maler Kotla, and Dhuri. Between 1855 and 1945, Vijayānandasūri also managed to convert śrāvakas of the Sthānakavāsī tradition to the Tapāgaccha tradition. Shri Buddhi Vijay Ji implemented the Mandir Margi Svetambara tradition in Punjab, which focused on constructing and reparing Jain temples, and installing idols. Under him, the Jain mat-Sabha was formed to manage all the Śvetāmbara Jain Sangh, with local branches in settlements being known as Ataman Nand Jain Sabha. The Pañjāb Lavajī Ṛṣi Saṃpradāya banned inter-sectarian marriages or people from different Jain sects from eating together, leading to communal divisions within the regional Osavāla caste.

During the colonial-period, some Punjabi Jains migrated to Africa on the premise of the colonial railway building, but they established businesses there. At Ludhiana, the Jains settled within the city-proper and were fundamental in the establishment of health and educational institutions in the city. The Nahata family constructed Jain temples in Multan, which was 0.04% Jain in 1941. The last yati of the Khartar gaccha gaddi of Multan, Suryamal, died in Calcutta, Bengal in 1943. The Jains were also present in Wazirabad.

=== 1947–present ===
==== Punjab, India ====
The non-image-venerating faction (amūrtipūjaka) took control over most of the Kharataragaccha Jain temples in Punjab, India after partition. The most prevalent Jain tradition in Indian Punjab today in-terms of number of monks/nuns/lay-followers are the Sthänakvāsī of the Śvetāmbara sect. The Sthankavasi Śvetāmbara Jains are increasing, with new sthankas being constructed in eastern Punjab and new initiates into their ranks of monks and nuns. Most of the women ascetics (sadhvis) of Punjab's Jain Sadhvi come from Hindu families. Yati Bhattaraks, whom are allowed to travel, can be found. There are also followers of the Baispanth and Terāpanthins. The yatis are extinct in Punjab as a religious tradition and their descendants are now functioning as a caste. Digambaras are comparatively less present when compared to the Śvetāmbaras. One organization is the Śrī Ātmānanda Jain Sabhā (Tapā Gaccha), which serves as a unifying umbrella organization. It functions to include diverse sub-groups (including Kharatara Gaccha and some Sthānakavāsī) into a single cohesive community.

In 1949, the ninth acarya of the Terāpanthins known as Shri Ji went to Punjab to promote the Anuvrat movement, which converted many local Punjabis to it during this visit. This initial visit was followed in 1978 with a four-month long stay in Ludhiana. The tenth acarya of the Terāpanthins, Mahaprajana Ji, visited Punjab three times by 2001, with Punjab being part of the Ahimsa-Yatra that year. On 14 February 2006, the Maryada (code-of-conduct) of the sangh was received under the tenth Terāpanthin acharya during the 143rd Maryada Mahotsava occurrence. In April the same year, the tenth acharya visited a couple of universities in Punjab. Some have converted to the Terāpanthins after the visits to Punjab by Acharya Tulsi and Acharya Mahaprajna, with new Terāpanthins bhavans being constructed in Punjab as a result.

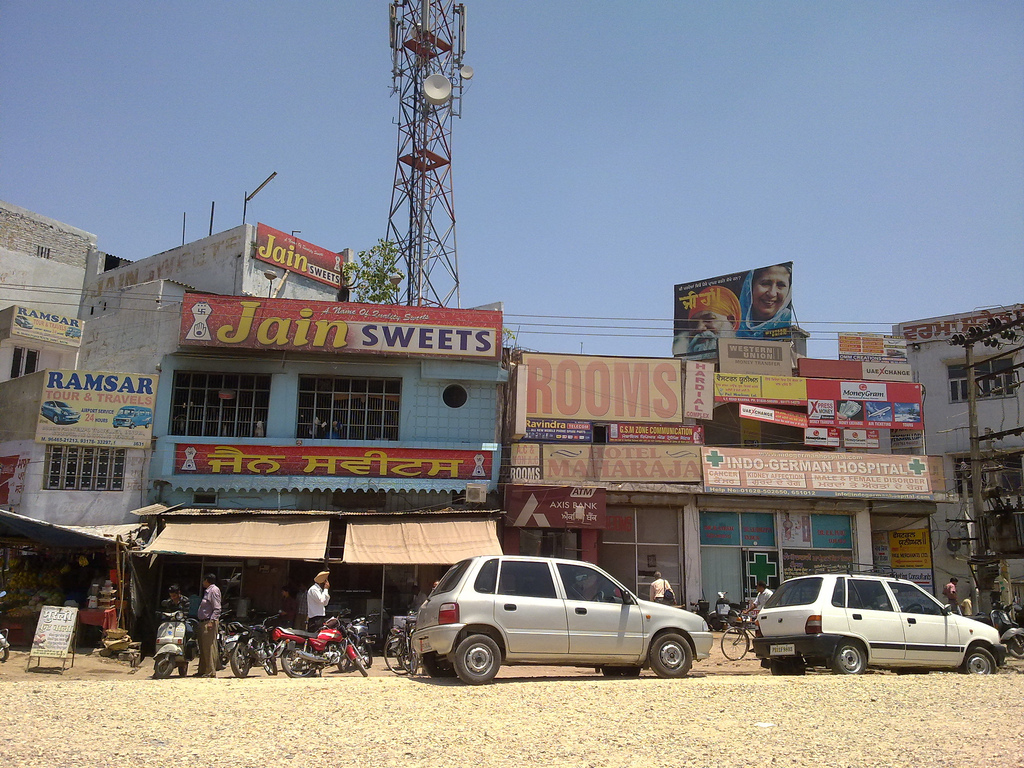
Jain shops in a market in Khanna, Ludhiana district, Punjab

In Punjab, India, the Jains can be found living in various settlements today and are known for founding educational and health institutions in the state. They are engaged in business at Amritsar, Ludhiana, and Jalandhar. They can also be found in Moga, where three Jain temples are located. The Jains of Indian Punjab founded educational and medical institutions at Barnala, Hoshiarpur, Jagraon, Jalandhar, Jandiala Guru, Khanna, Laalbai, Ludhiana, Nabha, Patiala, Raikot, Rajpura, Sardulgardh, Sahakot, and Sunam. The community's small numbers and lack of engagement in politics somewhat dimishes their influence in the state, with no Jain ever being elected to the Punjab Legislative Assembly since independence. However, some Jains have been elected to the position of sarpanch in the village panchayats. A Punjabi Jain politician named Joginder Pal Jain of the SAD-BJP alliance won the 2007 assembly election in the constituency of Moga, winning the same constituency of Moga in 2012 again against Paramdeep Singh Gill.

==== Punjab, Pakistan ====
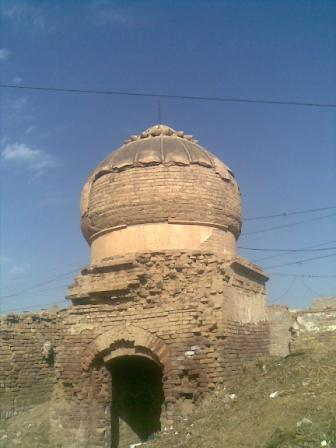
Remains of a Jain structure in Dunga Bunga, Bahawalnagar district, Punjab, Pakistan

Prior to the partition of India, Jains constituted around 1% of what is now Pakistan. Most Jains fled the region during the partition of India in 1947, with them settling in the newfound Republic of India. Some Jains stayed behind but they too left during the religious riots of the 1970s and 1990s. The fleeing Jain community took their tirthankar sculptures, artwork, and literature with them but their temples and other properties remained in Pakistan. Some Jain monks, such as Vijayavallabhasūri, broke religious vows to migrate to India for their survival by using trucks, trains or planes. Meanwhile, other Jains converted to Islam. The Jains refugees who moved eastward to India usually settled in Indian Punjab, Haryana, Rajasthan, Uttar Pradesh, and Delhi. A smaller minority of Jains remain in Pakistan, mostly confined to the Nagarparkar region of Sindh. The Jains of Multan, including the Nahata family, fled for India during partition, along with their monks and murtis. The Nahata family used an airplane to escape, with the Multani Jain artefacts and monks being shifted to a temple in Jaipur. Former Jain sites in Pakistan often became the residences of Muslim refugees from India, while Jain refugees from Pakistan often settled in former Muslim residences in India. The Shri Amar Jain Hostel Lahore was shifted to Chandigarh. Lahore lost its educated Jain population in 1947. The locality of Shahalami Bazaar in Lahore, where most Jain businesses were located, was surrounded in the violence of 1947 and its inhabitants burnt alive.

Jainism and Jain sites are classified as "Hindu" in Pakistan. In 1960, the Evacuee Trust Property Board (Awqaf) was formed to caretake the former sites of Sikhs and Hindus in Pakistan, with Jain heritage being classified as "Hindu" by them. Former Jain ghar-mandirs, upashraya, sthanaks, and sikhar band mandirs have been re-purposed for other uses by the Pakistani authorities and populace. In December 1992 in revenge attacks following the Babri Masjid incident, mobs destroyed the Jain Mandir of Old Anarkali in Lahore. A few Jain families still live in Mithi, Islamkot and Nagarparkar, without any operational worship places. In Sindh today, some Kharataragaccha followers still exist. Majid Sheikh found two Bhabra Jain jewellry traders in the Suha Bazaar of Lahore in 2015.

Very little research has been undertaken examining Jainism in Pakistan. Many locations in Pakistan are still named after the Jain community, such as Bhabra bazaars in Rawalpindi, and Gali Bhabrian and Thari Bhabrian (mohalla) in Lahore. There is also the Brahbra Stop on Ferozepur Road of Lahore.

== Jain temples ==
Jain temples are known as a derasar, especially in Gujrat and Rajasthan. They share many architectural, artistic, and functional similarities with Hindu temples, consisting of a Shikhara (dome), Mandapa (where the devotees pray), and Garbhagriha (sanctum santorum where the murti is placed). Jain temples may contain more than one shrine within them, have auxiliary structures attached to them for various purposes, and may be clustered together to create a temple-complex or temple-city.

=== Temples in Punjab, India ===
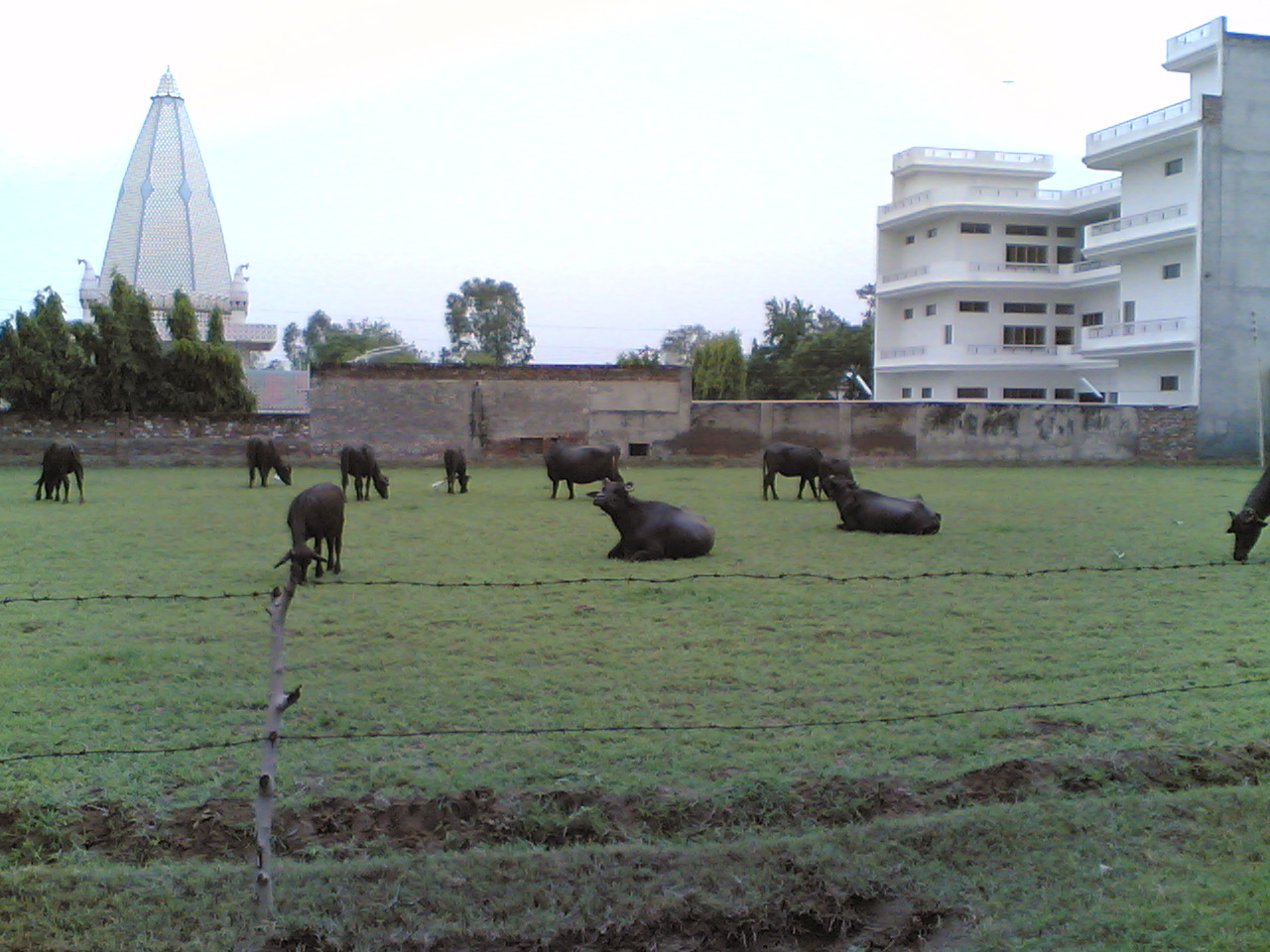
Jain temple in Jagraon, Ludhiana district, 2006

In Sirhind, there is the historical Mata Chakreshwari Devi temple. In Moga, three Jain temples can be found, namely the Power Smaraiko Jain Temple (in Patti Sadhwan on Kotkapura road), the Jain Sthankas near Jawahar Nagar, and Sri Chintamani Parsvanatha Mandir. The Power Smaraiko Jain Temple of Moga is dedicated to female ascetics known as sadhvīs and does not contain idols of the tirthankars but it does contain other religious images (such as charan paduka) of other Jain figures. The temple is built in the style of a Hindu mandir. An annual Bhandara is held there dedicated to Chamatkarini Balbrahmcharini Mahasti Sri Lajjawati Ji that draws Jain attendees from around Punjab. A Jain temple, known as Jain Dadavari temple, dedicated to the Śvetāmbara figure Acharya Jin Chandra Suri Ji can be found in Samana, Punjab. In Samana in Patiala district, the Shanti Nath Jain Śvetāmbara Mandir is located there, which is made out of white Makrana and black Italian marble. Also located in Samana in the Samana Mandi is the Bhagavan Kunthunath Jain temple dedicated to Kunthunath managed by the Bhagavan Kunthunath Jain Samiti, which has incorporates both traditional and contemporary art-styles and has a peach-coloured, rectangular shikhar. A Śvetāmbara Jain temple in Faridkot with an idol of Arishtanemi is managed by the Sthankavasi Samaj. The shrine of Baba Dharam Dass originally located in Pasrur, Pakistan was rebuilt in India, with one in Ludhiana and another in Meerut.

=== Temples in Punjab, Pakistan ===
Jain sites, such as temple, markets, community centers, halls, schools, samadhis, and residential buildings, can be found in Lahore, Gujranwala, Jhelum, Rawalpindi, Nagarparkar and other areas of Pakistan. As for Jain temples specifically, they have been rediscovered at Jhelum, Narowal, Sialkot, Gujranwala, Pipnakha, Rasulnagar, Kasur, Bhera, Multan, Khanqah Dogran, Lahore, Dera Ghazi Khan, Virawah, Nagarparkar, Bhodesar, and Karachi. Artefacts from these temples can be found in the collections of the Lahore Museum and Umerkot Museum.

Much of the Jain heritage in Pakistan remains unstudied and undeciphered. Jain sites are mistaken as being Hindu and have been converted into private properties, causing damages and misunderstandings. The Jains throughout their history in the region constructed temples (known as a derasar), memorials (samadhis), community-halls (especially the Sthanakvasi sect), and schools, especially in northern Punjab. Much of the remaining Jain heritage is located in the northern and southern parts of western Punjab. No Jain structures have been identified from the period of Mahavira in the 6th century BCE. However, remains of Jain temples at Sirkap dating to the 1st–2nd centuries CE has been identified. Some Jain architectural remains from the Murti site in Chakwal dating to a later period are known, with some of it being housed at the Jaina Gallery in the Lahore Museum.

Later Jain structures from the mediaeval period and colonial period can also be found in Punjab, Pakistan. The sculptures and paintings present within the temples have been vandalized, such as by scratching them. The Jain temple at Rasulnagar in Gujranwala district lost many of its paintings in this manner. Furthermore, their marble floors are being damaged. In Punjab, the former Jain temples are often used as local residences and the sanctum santorum (gambhara) as store-rooms. Also, the prayer-halls (mandapas) are used as stables or scrap-yards. Examples of this repurposing of former Jain temples include the Jain Manzil Tehsil Bazaar in the walled-city of Lahore (used as a stable) and the temple at Bagh Mohalla in Jhelum (used as a scrap-yard). Very few Jain temples of the Digambar sect survive in Pakistan, most of their former temples in the cantonment areas of Rawalpindi, Lahore, Sialkot, and Karachi have been demolished since 1947. However, a couple of Digambar temples can still be found in the bazaar areas of the old walled-city of Multan and the cantonment.

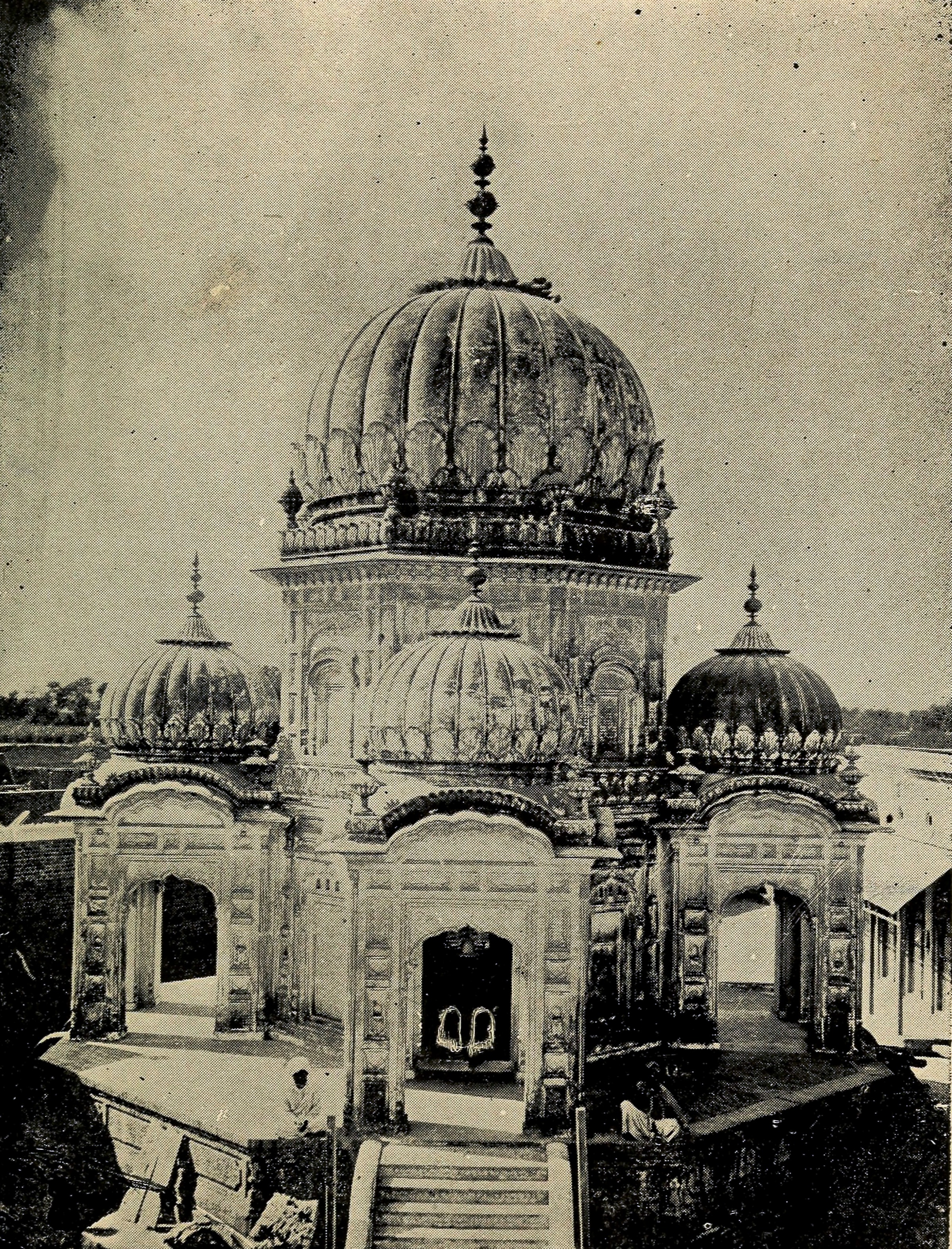
Memorial shrine of Vijayanandsuri in Gujranwala. Now used as a police station of Sabzi Mandi area.

At-least one or two Jain temples can be found in every major city in Punjab, Pakistan. As many as twelve Jain temples may have existed within the old walled-city of Lahore, mostly in Shahalami Bazaar, although one is near Chuna Mandi. The Adinatha temple in Lahore is in very poor-condition. The Jain Manzil of Tehsil Bazaar in Lahore is now occupied by Gujjars who use it as a place to keep buffalos. There is a shikar-style Jain Shwetambar Mandir in Mohallah Thari Bhabrian in Lahore. Another Jain temple, the Jain Digambar temple, can be found at Gali Bhabrian. Mohallah Bhabrian had two Jain temples, one was a Digambar temple while the other was a Swetambar temple, both beside each-other. At Guru Mangat, Gulberg, there is a small Jain Shwetambar temple with footprint relics of Mahavira. Jain temples can also be found in Sialkot. In Narowal, there is still a Jain temple built in VS 1913 (c. 1856–1857 CE) dedicated to Munisuvrata remaining in Chaukhandi Muhalla, now a home from an East Punjab refugee family from Gurdaspur who maintain it. In Multan, three Jain temples are traceable, two within Choori Saraey Bazaar near Bohar Gate within the old walled-city of Multan, the Parshvanath Jain Shwetambar temple and Digambar Jain temple, and another third temple is the Digambar temple in Multan Cantonment. A Jain temple located in Dera Ghazi Khan is architecturally a sister to the Parshvanath Jain Shwetambar temple in Multan, however most of its paintings have been white-washed by the current residents of the site. There is a samadhi dedicated to Atmaramji located off the Grand Trunk road in Sabzi Mandi, Gujranwala city, which also has an associated ghar mandir (small temple). There is also a samadhi dedicated to the Jain figure Jin Kushal Suraj in Derawar in Bahawalpur. The Jain heritage of Sindh fares better due to it being protected under an endowment trust fund. The Jain temples in the Thar desert in Sindh are in the best condition.

==== Restoration and research ====
There are at-least forty extant Jain temples in Pakistan, with some of these lying in Sindh instead of Punjab. However, the lack of a local Jain population means the Pakistani temples are abandoned and in a dilapidated state. After the 1992 Babri Masjid incident, many Jain temples in Pakistan were vandalized and damaged by upset mobs. However, some Muslim locals saved the Jain temples from demolition during this time. According to historian Sam Dalrymple, there is a growing awareness of conserving Jain temples in Pakistan. In 2014, the Evacuee Trust Property Board was given the responsibility of renovating and restoring the former and current places of worship of religious minorities. The restoration of a Jain temple in Lahore began in 2021. Furthermore, the Atmaramji shrine in Gujranwala also underwent renovation, with the Parshvanath temple in Multan also slated for restoration. In 2022, the Evacuee Trust Property Board made plans to renovate and restore all forty known Jain temples located in the country. The Jain Digambar Temple in Old Anarkali, Lahore and the Samadhi of Atamaramji in Gujranwala were restored by the board. The Bhabra community of Lahore had requested to restore the temple themselves. The Department of Archeology of the University of the Punjab has been preparing artistic and architectural studies on Jain sites.

A research survey by SOAS University of London and Nusrat Jahan College to map and document the remaining Jain heritage in Pakistan was carried out from 2015 to 2017 by Peter Flügel, Tahira Saeed, Mirza Naseer Ahmad, Muzaffar Ahmad, and Ahtesham Aziz Chaudhary. The study found ninety surviving Jain sites in Punjab, Sindh, and Khyber Pakhtunkhwa of both the Digambara and Śvetāmbara sects (temples, dādābāṛīs, sthānakas, samādhis, libraries, schools, hostels, and mohallās).

== Jain sects ==
The Punjabi Jains were not uniform, they were sectorally divided into various Gaṇā, Sangha, Gachchha, and Shakha. In Punjab, two major factions were the Prashna Vahaka (Peshawari Kul) and Ucha Nagar Kul. The Gandhari Gaccha was one of the eighty-four Gacchas of the Śvetāmbaras, who conducted missionary activities in the Peshawar region until the 13th–14th centuries CE. The Uccha Nagar Kul was associated with Taxila and was mentioned in the works of Fahyan and Muni Kalyan Vijai. By the late 18th century in Punjab, the Yati tradition (also known as sri pujya) became popular, with the yatis being known as pujyaji (also called shramana, sadhu, bhikshu, muni, anagara, and niggantha, nuns were known as sadhvi) and their acharyas being known as sri pujya, belonging to the Bada gachha, Khartar gaccha, Tapa gaccha, and Lonkā gaccha traditions. They maintained celibacy and rejected a family-life and all possessions, living only at a temple or at a upāśrayas. They follow a teacher-student tradition, where a disciple learns from a master. They became scholars, focusing on Jain literature, astrology, vaidyaka, puja, and mantra-yantra-tantra. Their centres or seats were known as gaddies. Yati Bhattarakas in Punjab were known as pujji and they were proficient in the Sanskrit, Prakrit, Hindi, Gujrati, Urdu, and Farsi languages, producing scholarly works on linguistics and poetics. The Śvetāmbara Jains of the Punjabi Oswal caste follow the Sthānakavāsī, Mūrtipūjaka, and Terāpanthī sects.

== Culture ==
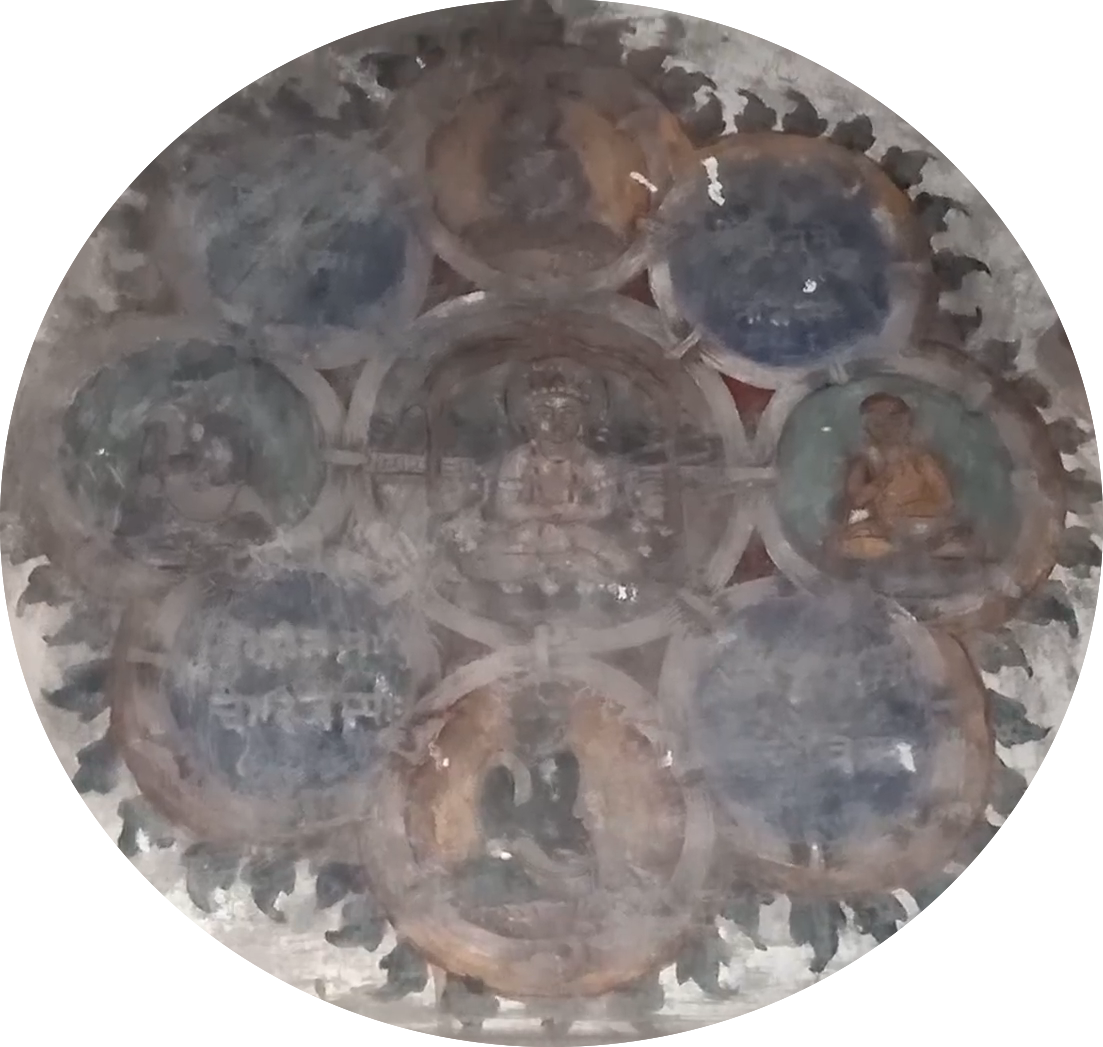
Mural depicting the Siddhachakra (also known as Navapada), from a Jain temple in Rasool Nagar, Punjab, Pakistan

The Jains of Punjab usually marry within their own community and caste. However, some intercaste marriages occur between the Gupta and Aggarwal Jains. Widow remarriage is generally not observed by them. The Punjabi Jains observe the religious celebrations (Parva), such as Amavas (Diwali, associated with Mahavira's nirvana), Mahavir Jayanti (where they hold a parade and fast), and Parushana Parva. Punjabi Sthänakvāsīs recite the Namokar Mahamnantra on Paryushan Parva. Their places of worship are similar to other Punjabi places of worship, where men and women sit segregated, shoes are taken off before entry, and men wear turbans when conducting devotionary practices.

The birthday of Jin Chandra Suri is celebrated at Jain Dadavari temple, Samana on Bhadon Sudi Astmi (corresponding to September), which attracts pilgrims. The Jains of Samana visit the Jain Dadavari temple for the mundan ceremony of young sons and for marriages. The Jains of India generally make pilgrimage trips to the Mata Chakreshwari Devi temple in Sirhind, especially Khandehval Jains. In Samana, the Rath-Yatra procession occurs where an old idol of the first tirthankar is displayed.

The Punjabi Jains have a practice of venerating ancestors of their gotra as a kul deva/devi. This can be found amongst the Śrī Ātmānanda Jain Sabhā (Tapā Gaccha). While Jain religious rituals are conducted according to the texts of the specific ascetic lineage (samudāya) the follower supports, the rituals for clan deities are generally simple but highly varied by gotra. Every morning after bathing, individuals stand before a house shrine, hold a purified coin, recite the Namaskara Mantra followed by a short prayer (e.g., "Jay Dādī Jī Kī"), and place the coin in a box to pray for family prosperity. Navarātrī is celebrated twice a year (Spring and Autumn). Offerings (prasāda) differ by season: wheat bread (roti) in spring and rice (cavala) in autumn, along with sweets like laddū or halvā. The most important are marriage and the muṇḍana (first hair-cutting ceremony). Marriage rituals involve the clan deity at the bride and groom's respective homes. The muṇḍana is performed for boys, usually after their third Dussehra. The location for this (shrine, home, or assembly hall) is strictly dictated by gotra tradition.

== Literature ==
Before 1900 CE, Jain writers were active in the localities of Sunam, Dera Haji Khan, Gujranwala, Sialkot, Firozpur, Samana, Patti, Jind, Hastinapur, Narnaul, Faridkot, Sirsa, Hisar, Amritsar, Malerkotla, Jandiala Guru, Ramnagar, Rajpura, Ambahata, Phagwara, Kalabaga, Samkhattara, Kapurthala, Balachaur, Nabhapur, Sadhora, and Karnal. As Jainism took root in Punjab, the Jain Sūtras were gradually translated into the local prevailing languages, such as Punjabi, so that they could be read by the local population. Some Jain sūtra have been translated into Punjabi, such as the Shri Uttardhyān Suttram, Upāshak dshaṅg Sūtra, Dash Vaikalika Sūtra, Nirayavalika Sūtra, Rishi Bhashit Sūtra, Saman Sūtra, and Sūtra Kritanga. The first Punjabi translation of a Jain sutra was the translation of the Shri Uttardhyān Suttram that was prepared by Ravinder Kumar Jain and edited by Purshotam Dass Jain. The Uttardhyān sūtra was of importance to transmit Jain philosophy in Punjab. Shravaks were instructed by yatis to produce handwritten copies of the agamas, with these agama works being produced by Jain councils known as vachanas over a thousand-year period. The treatise Vijn͂aptitriveṇī which was published in 1916 by Muni Jina Vijaya documents the early-mediaeval period in Punjab. The work Sūrya Šāhasranāma stotra was written by a Jain monk that accompanied Akbar's retinue to Kashmir. Also written by a Jain during Akbar's reign at Lahore was the Aṣṭalakṣī, which included eight-hundred-thousand interpretations of the Sanskrit phrase rājāno dadate saukhyam ("kings bestow happiness"). Aside from original works, copies of pre-existing works were also produced during the mediaeval period by Jains in Punjab. The Vaka written by Rsi Rugha in 1792 traces the Jain history of Lahore, discussing Raja Bhoja (674), and defeat of Jayapala during the invasion by Mahmud of Ghazni (1021), the death of Aurangzeb (1707). In the 19th century, the yatis of the Khartargaccha tradition in Faridkot (calling themselves puspikas in their writings) prepared many facsimiles of Jain scriptures. Banarasidas Jain of Punjab University Lahore had a large collection of ancient Jain texts. Old Jain texts are maintained today in Punjab at temples and sthankas. An important Jain text for Punjabi Jains belonging to the Sthänakvāsī tradition is the Antagadadasao Sūtra. The Shanti Nath Jain Śvetāmbara Mandir temple of Samana has a Kalpa Sūtra manuscript written in grinded gold-ink and embellished in gold in its collection.

== Demographics and caste ==
The Jains of Punjab, including Lahore, primarily belonged to the Vaishya class, with two major divisions being the Saraogi and the Aswal. Most of the Punjabi Jains were Bhabras, a mercantile caste claiming to originate from the settlement of Bhabra in Punjab near the Chenab river. The Bhabras were prevalent in Sialkot and Pasrur but also the urban areas of Lahore. According to Denzil Ibbetson, 99% of the Jains in Punjab belonged to classes engaged in trades and were mostly Banias and Bhabras, although some were involved in agriculture. Most of the Śvetāmbara Jains in Punjab ultimately have Rajasthani origins, with most being members of a caste known as Oswal (Osvāl), claiming to originate from Osia, Rajasthan. The gotra is the smallest unit of social organization for Jains. Punjabi Jains, mostly from the Oswal caste, maintained their social and cultural traditions while migrating, but also adapted to their new environment by adopting ancestor worship as clan deities. Migration followed along clan or family units called a gotra (sub-castes/lineages). These Jain settlers spread over a wide area, reaching as far as towns on the current border of Afghanistan, the distribution of residential areas often reflects these gotra divisions. Upon settling, they formed communities in various cities and towns across Pakistan and Punjab and established Jain temples, such as in Gujranwala, Lahore, Rawalpindi, and Multan. Śvetāmbara Jains migrated more readily to Punjab when compared to the Digambara Jains. The Agrawalas of Rajasthan claim to originate from Agrohā in Punjab that was founded by Agrasena. The Nagara Kotera gotra is named after Nagara Kota village in Punjab, auspicious to both Jains and Hindus in historical times.

Gujranwala was a major center for the Mūrtipūjaka sect in pre-partition India. Out of 300 Śvetāmbara families, 225 were Mūrtipūjaka and 75 were Sthānakavāsī. These families belonged to gotras such as Duggar, Barar, Lohrā, Jakh, Muhnānī, Līgā, Tripankhiyā, Pārakh, and Gadhiyā. In the border towns of Bannu and Kohat near Afghanistan, members of the Vaid and Saurānā gotras (belonging to the Kharatara Gaccha) migrated from areas near Jaisalmer. In Bannu, a Mūrtipūjaka temple was built in 1917 by 10–12 families. Today, the major cities in Indian Punjab with large Mūrtipūjaka populations include Amritsar, Jalandhar, Hoshiarpur, Chandigarh, and Ludhiana. The hub of the Śvetāmbara Mūrtipūjaka is Ludhiana, a center for the textile and machinery industries. Instead of traditional commercial activities, most followers here are factory owners manufacturing cotton and wool textiles. Before Partition, Ludhiana was home to about 100 Jain families from five gotras (Gadhiyā, Pātṇī, Vaid, Līgā, Bamb); after Partition, many Jains fleeing Pakistan settled there. Currently, approximately 4,500 families (12,000–15,000 people) belong to the Śrī Ātmānanda Jain Sabhā, Ludhiana, making it the largest congregation in Northern India. Of these, the Gadhiyā gotra is the largest group, with roughly 1,000 households.

In the colonial period, the British officials did not always distinguish the Jains from the Hindus in Punjab, perhaps due to the word Jain being synonymous with mercantile/trading occupations, such as the Baniyas and Mahajan, that also included Hindus. Furthermore, there was intermarriage between Jains and Hindus which made delineation between the two groups challenging. In the 1921 census of British-India, the Jains of Punjab were conflated as Jain-Hindus, not recognizing them as a separate religious group from the Punjabi Hindus. According to the 2011 census, 45,040 Jains lived in Indian Punjab. 436 Jains lived in Moga district as per the 2011 census.

== Punjabi Jain women ==
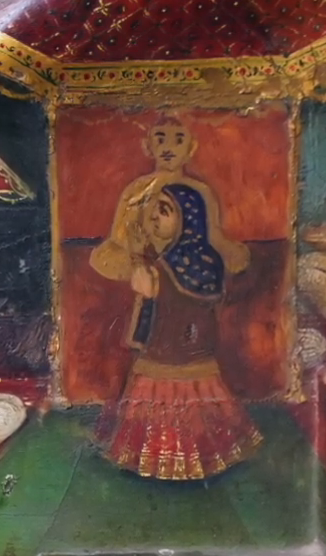
Jain woman taking a pledge at a diksha ceremony, detail of a Tirath-Pata (pilgrimage map) of Shatrunjaya, from a Jain temple in Gujranwala, Punjab, Pakistan, 1941

Women hold comparatively high-status in the Punjabi Jain community. Women ascetic nuns (sadhvīs) were tasked with patronizing the publishing Jain writings. Most medical, educational, and religious institutions established by Punjabi Jains are named after women nuns.

== See also ==
- Jainism and Sikhism
- Diwan Todar Mal
