= Jinaratnasuri =

Jain scholar monk

Acharya Jinaratna

Personal life
- Born: 13th century
- Died: 13th century

Religious life
- Religion: Jainism
- Sect: Śvetāmbara

Jinaratnasuri (Jina·ratna·suri; Hindi: जिनरत्नसूरी was a Śvetāmbara Jain scholar and a monk of Kharatara Gaccha, who composed Līlāvatīsāra. He completed his poem in the year 1285 CE in Jabaliputra, western India, (modern Jalore in Rajasthan). It is an epitome of a much larger work called Nivvāṇalīlāvaīkahā composed in Jain Maharashtri, a Prakrit language, in 1036 by Jineshvarasuri, also a Jain monk.

What little is known about Jinaratnasuri, he states himself in the colophon he placed at the end of his poem, in which he gives the lineage of the succession of monastic teachers and pupils from Vardhamana, the teacher of Jineshvarasuri who was the author of Nivvāṇalīlāvaīkahā, to another Jineshvarasuri who was Jinaratnasuri's own teacher. Jinaratnasuri belonged to the Kharatara Gaccha of Śvetāmbara Jainism.

Jinaratnasuri studied literature, logic and the canonical texts of Śvetāmbaras with Jineshvarasuri and other monks. In his colophon he acknowledges the help he received from others in the preparation and correction of the text of Līlāvatīsāra.

Jinaratnasuri in his introductory verses to Līlāvatīsāra describes how his interest in Jineshvarasuri's poem was stimulated by his own teacher. Jinaratnasuri states that he began to write his epitome at the request of those who wished to concentrate on its narrative alone.

By writing in Sanskrit, the pan-Indian language of learned discourse, Jinaratnasuri gave Līlāvatīsāra a far wider readership than was possible for Jineshvarasuri's Nivvāṇalīlāvaīkahā, since it was written in the Prakrit Jain Maharashtri, a language with a more restricted currency.

Jinaratnasuri displays his mastery of Sanskrit poetics by interspersing complex lyric metres throughout his poem. Not only does Jinaratnasuri employ rare works and unusual grammatical forms drawn from the Sanskrit lexicons and grammars, but he also incorporates into his poem words taken from contemporary spoken vernaculars. Jinaratnasuri's language in the narrative portions of the poem is fast moving and direct, but it is far more ornate in his descriptions of cities, mountains, desert wilderness, battles, festivals, and other topics with which a Sanskrit epic should be embellished.

== English translations ==
The Clay Sanskrit Library has published a translation of Līlāvatīsāra by R.C.C. Fynes under the title of The Epitome of Queen Lilávati (two volumes).

== See also ==
- Līlāvatīsāra (The Epitome of Lilavati)
- Nivvāṇalīlāvaīkahā
