= Līlāvatīsāra =

Religious poem

Līlāvatīsāra (epitome of Līlāvatī) is a poem composed by Jinaratnasuri. Jinaratnasuri belonged to Kharatara Gaccha of the Śvetāmbara sect of Jainism. It tells the stories of the lives of a group of souls as they pass through a series of embodiments on their way to final liberation from the continual cycle of death and rebirth. The purpose of these stories, which are related to Queen Līlāvatī and her husband King Sinha by the teacher-monk Samarasena (Samara-sena), is to promote the ethic of Jainism, which holds that strict adherence to a nonviolent way of life is the key to liberation from the troubles of the world. In the end, Queen Līlāvatī, King Sinha and the other leading characters attain perfect knowledge and liberation.

As its title suggests, The Epitome of Līlāvatī is an epitome of a much larger work, Nivvāṇa-līlāvaī-kahā The Story of the Final Emancipation of Līlāvatī, composed in 1036 by Jineshvara, also a Jain monk. Jinaratnasuri wrote his epitome at the request of those who wished to concentrate on its narrative.

The primary purpose of Jain narrative literature was to edify lay people through amusement; consequently the stories are racy, and in some cases the moralising element is rather tenuous. The main feature of Jain narrative literature is its concern with past and future lives. There developed a genre of soul biography, the histories, over a succession of rebirths, of a group of characters who exemplified the vices of anger, pride, deceit, greed and delusion.

== Critical edition of Līlāvatīsāra ==
Jinaratna's Līlāvatī-Sāra: A Sanskrit Abridgement of Jineśvara Sūri's Prakrit Līlāvaī-Kahā edited by H.C. Bhayani, Ahmedabad, 1983: L.D. Institute of Indology 96.

== English translations ==
The Clay Sanskrit Library has published a translation of Līlāvatīsāra by R.C.C. Fynes under the title of The Epitome of Queen Lilávati (2005, second volume 2006).

== See also ==
- Nivvāṇalīlāvaīkahā
