= Nivvāṇalīlāvaīkahā =

Story in Jainism

The Nivvāṇalīlāvaīkahā (Nivvāṇa-līlāvaī-kahā) 'Story of the Final Emancipation of Līlāvatī' composed in 1036 by Jineshvarasuri, a Śvetāmbara Jain monk of Kharatara Gaccha. The work was composed in Jain Maharashtri, a Prakrit language. Jineshvarasuri was a reformist of lax monasticism, and his work was considered highly conducive to liberation.
The primary purpose of Jain narrative literature was to edify lay people through amusement; consequently the stories are racy, and in some cases the moralising element is rather tenuous. The main feature of Jain narrative literature is its concern with past and future lives. There developed a genre of soul biography, the histories, over a succession of rebirths, of a group of characters who exemplified the vices of anger, pride, deceit, greed and delusion.
A Sanskrit abridgement of Nivvāṇalīlāvaīkahā was made by Jinaratnasuri, pupil of Jineshvarasuri, by the title Līlāvatīsāra.

== See also ==
- Līlāvatīsāra(The Epitome of Lilavati)
- Jinaratnasuri
