= Jinacandrasūri II =

Fourth Dādā Guru of the Kharatara Gaccha tradition

- Title: Dadaguru

Religious life
- Religion: Jainism
- Sect: Śvetāmbara; Kharataragaccha (Dadabadi)

Religious career
- Post: Fourth dadaguru
- Predecessor: Jinakuśalasūri

Jinacandrasūri (1541–1613), also known as Jinacandrasūri II, was a Jain religious leader who served as the fourth dādāguru of the Kharataragaccha tradition of Śvetāmbara Jainism. He was originally from Rajasthan. He was able to meet Mughal emperor Akbar in Lahore in 1592, 1593, and 1594 due to the intercession by the Jain Osavāla official named Karam Chand Bachhawat. After meeting Akbar, he visited Multan (Mūlasthāna), Uch (Uccapuri) in 1595 and also visited the samadhi of Jinakuśalasūri in Derawar. After this visit, he returned to Rajasthan. After his death, he was replaced as head or pontiff (sūri) by Jinasiṃhasūri, who maintained good-relations with emperor Jahangir. He is mentioned in the Bṛhatkharataragaccheśvaragurvāvalī (MS Or.812) treatise held in Cambridge University Library. He should not be confused with other Jinacandrasūris who preceded him as Jain leaders and writers, such as Jinacandrasūri (active V.S. 1125; 1069 C.E.) or the 2nd dādāguru, Maṇidhārī Jinacandrasūri (V.S. 1197–1223; 1140/1141–1166/1167 C.E.).
