= Jinadattasuri =

First Dādā Guru of the Kharatara Gaccha tradition

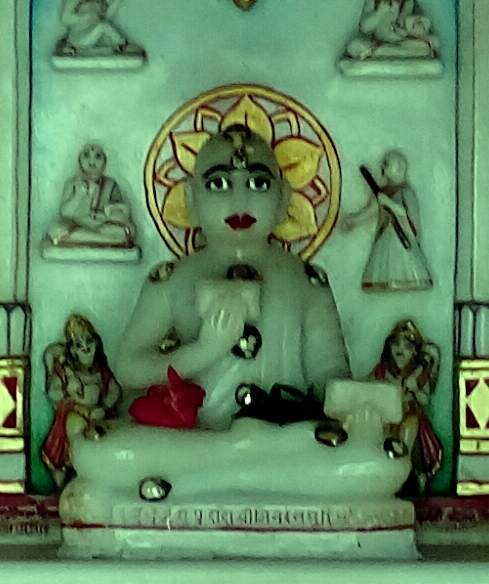
- Title: Dadaguru

Religious life
- Religion: Jainism
- Sect: Śvetāmbara; Kharataragaccha (Dadabadi)

Religious career
- Post: First dadaguru
- Successor: Jinacandrasūri I

Jinadattasuri was a Jain Apabhramsa poet and monk. He was born in 1075 and died in 1154. He was a contemporary of Hemchandra and a disciple of Jinavallabhsuri. He was the first dadaguru of the Kharataragaccha tradition and won converts in Sindh. After his death at Ajmer, a monument was erected there and the place is known as Dadabari.

== Works ==
His Upadesharasayana-rasa (1143) is a didactic poem of 80 verse written in the form of a Rasa. In appreciation of his teacher Jinavallabhsuri, he wrote a didactic poem in 32 verses titled Kalaswarupakulakam in Apabhramsa and Chachchari.

== Gallery ==
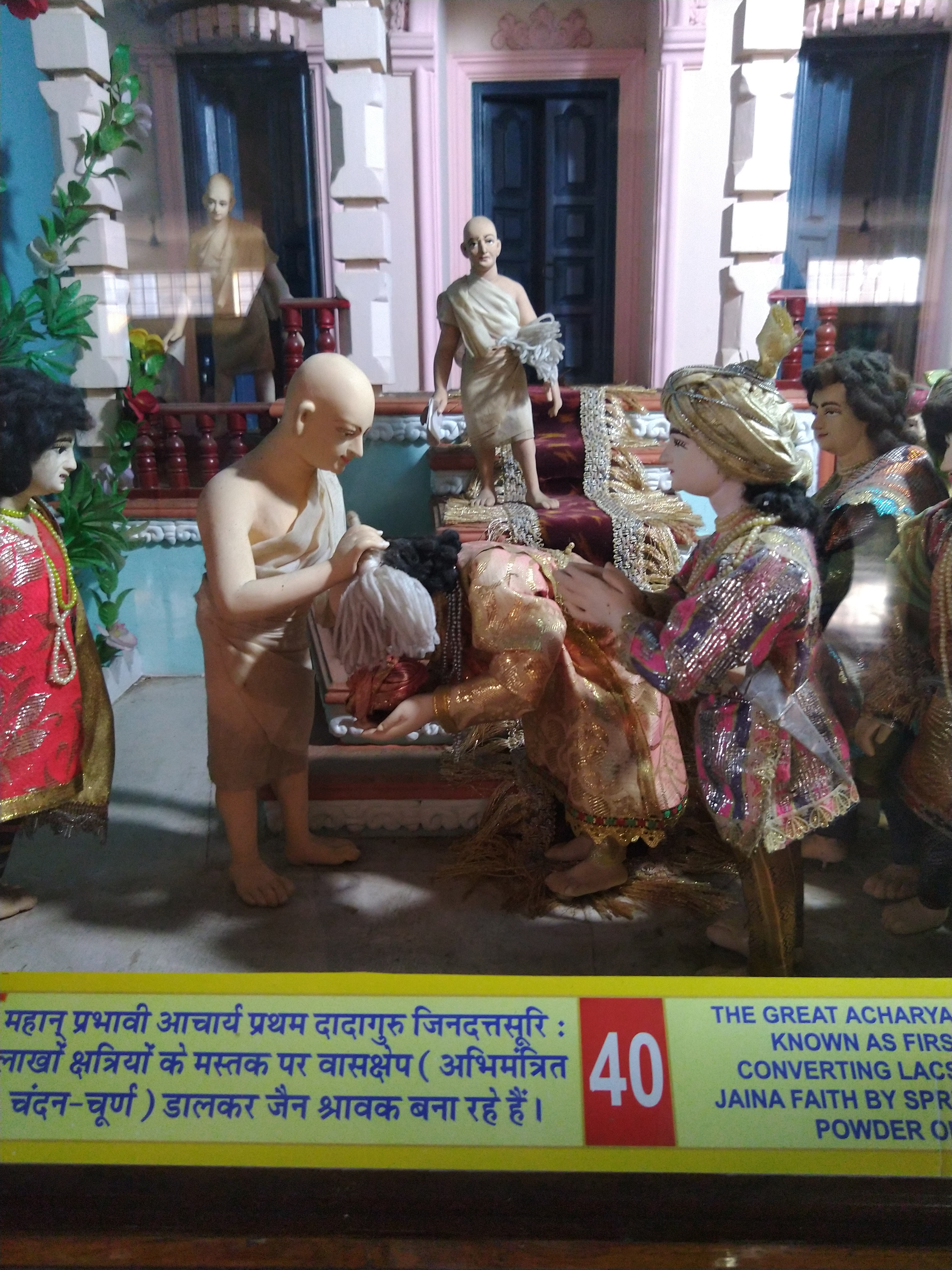
A diorama in the Jain Museum of Madhuban depicting Jindattasuri

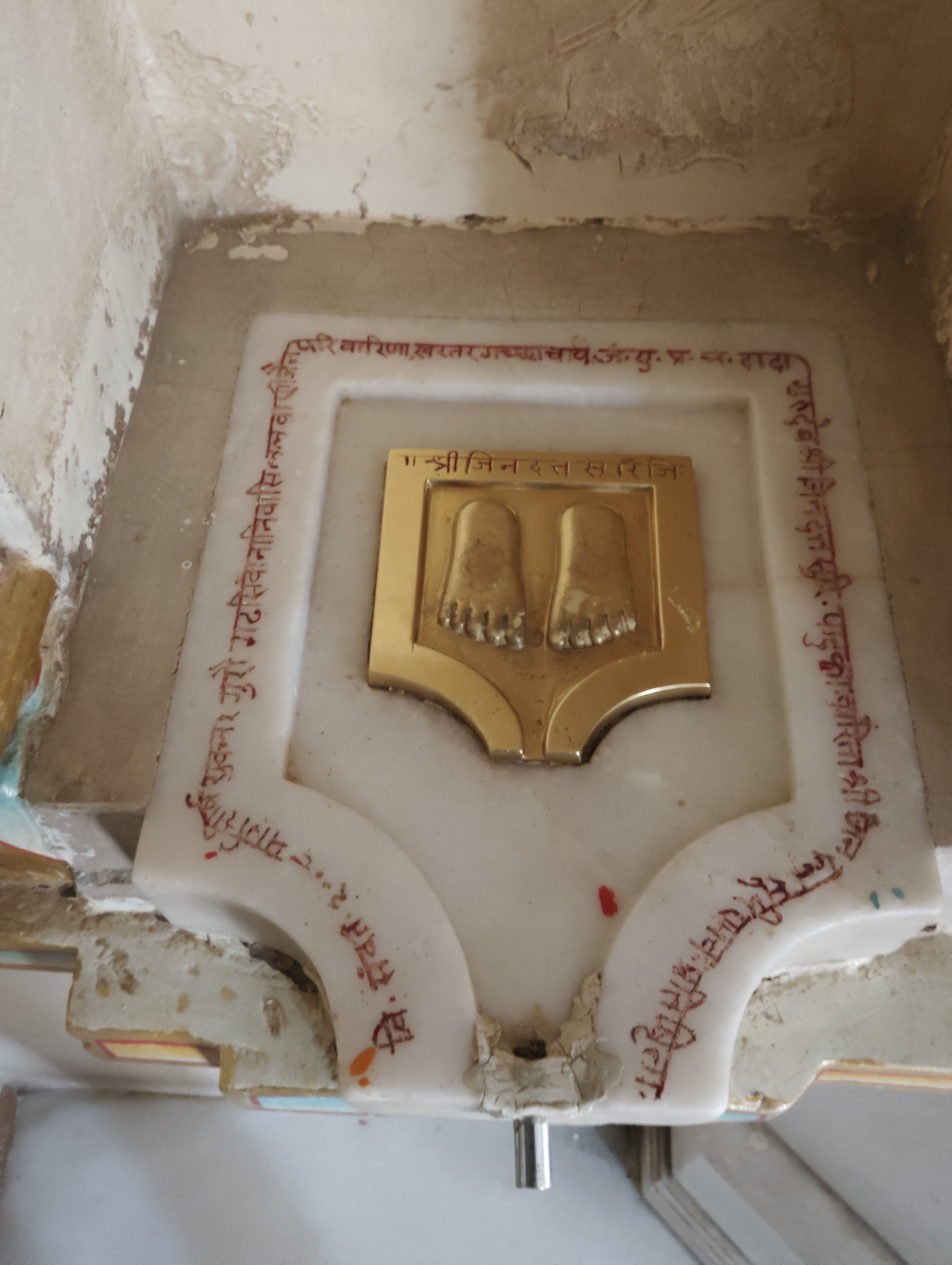
Memorial footprints of Jinadattasuri installed at Nakoda Parshwanath Jain Tirth
