= Dādābadī =

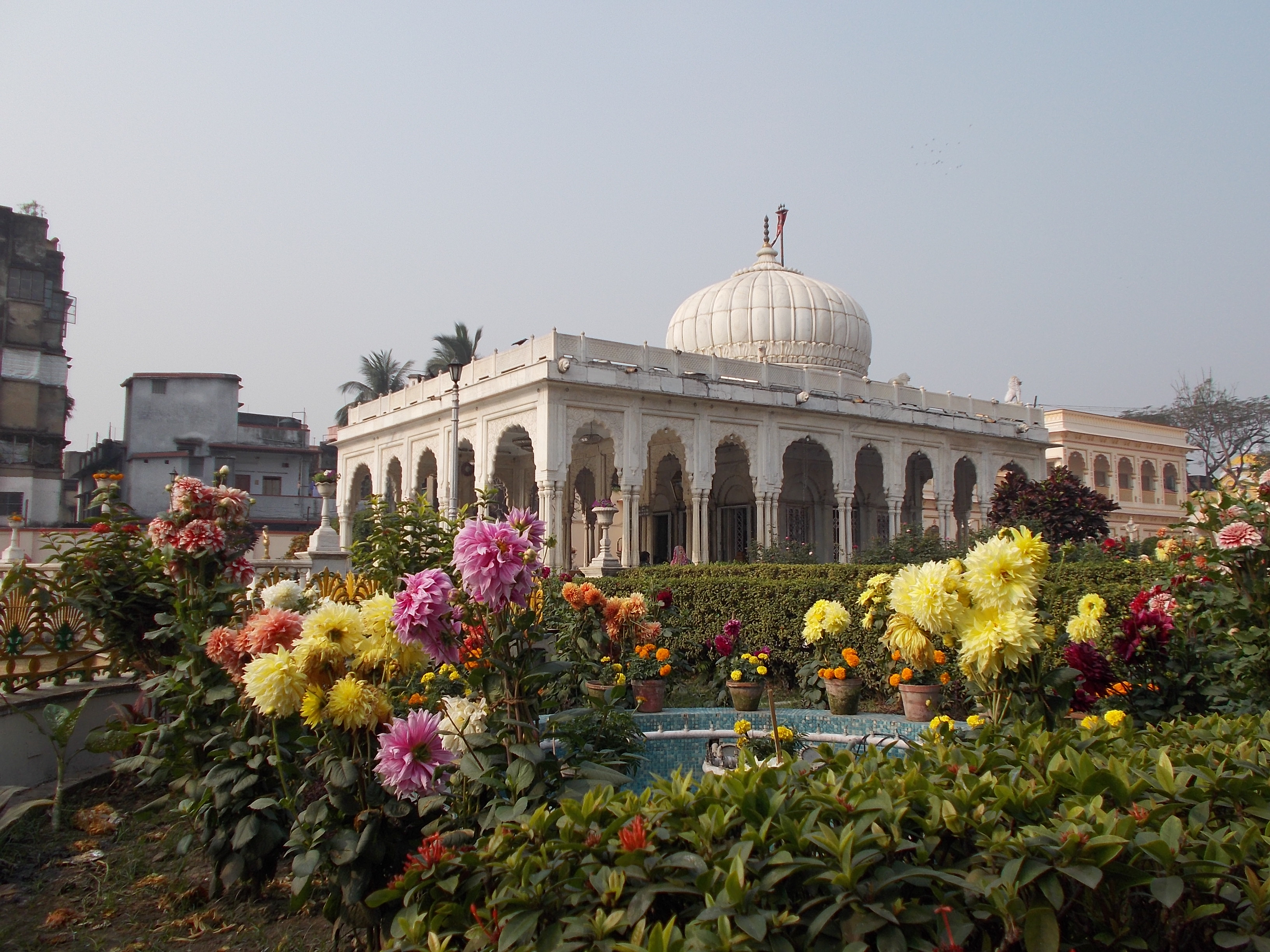
Dadabari, Badridas Temple Street, Kolkata

A Dādābāḍī is a type of shrine, usually located near a Jain temple, and dedicated to one of the four Dādā Gurus revered by the Kharatara Gaccha sect of the Śvetāmbara Jains. The most notable shrines are in Ajmer, Malpura and Mehrauli. The four Dādā Gurus are Jinadatta Sūri (1075–1154 CE), Jinachandra Sūri Maṇidhārī (1140–1166 CE), Jinakuśala Sūri (1280–1332 CE) and Jinachandra Sūri II (1541–1613 CE).

== Four dādā gurus of the Dādābadī/Dādābāṛī tradition ==
The following four are known as Dada Guru in the sect and are venerated as spiritual guides.

- Jinadatta Sūri (1075―1154 CE), is the most famous ascetic of Gaccha who won converts in Sindh. After his death at Ajmer, a monument was erected there and the place is known as Dadabari.
- Maṇidhārī Jinachandra Sūri (1140―1166 CE)
- Jinakushal Sūri (1279–1331) gained many converts in western India.
- Jinachandra Sūri II (1537―1612) visited Lahore in 1591, where he convinced Akbar to stop Muslim attack on Jain temples.

== Descriptions and lore ==
Major Dādābāḍī shrines

=== Ajmer ===
Ajmer is the "samadhi sthal" (memorial resting place) of the first Dādā Guru, Jinadatta Sūri. Two idols are inside: one of Parshva, the 23rd Tirthankara, which is made of seven metals and includes footprints believed to be his; and one of Vimalnath, the 13th Tirthankara. The shrine has a "teerth kshetra" (pilgrimage center) that was established in the 12th century.

=== Malpura ===
The dādābadī at Malpura is the one that receives the most visitors. It is dedicated to the Dādā Guru Jinakushala Sūri, who attained Samadhi (the heavenly abode) in Deraur (now in Pakistan), prior to which he stayed at Malpura gathering followers. It is believed that he appeared to one of those followers after his death to give him his insight and wisdom, while standing on a stone that still bears his footprint.

=== Mehrauli ===
The dādābadī in Mehrauli, Delhi, is the place where the second Dādā Guru Manidhari Jinachandra Sūri ji was cremated. According to the legend, while on his deathbed, he told his followers that when he died the "Mani" (magic jewel) embedded in his forehead would fall out and should be placed in a bowl of milk. He also instructed them that his body should not be kept anywhere while preparing for the funeral. Everyone was so sad, however, that they forgot his instructions and set his body on the ground. When they tried to move it again, it wouldn't budge. Even elephants were used, but all attempts failed and the last rites had to be performed right there, at the spot where the shrine now stands.

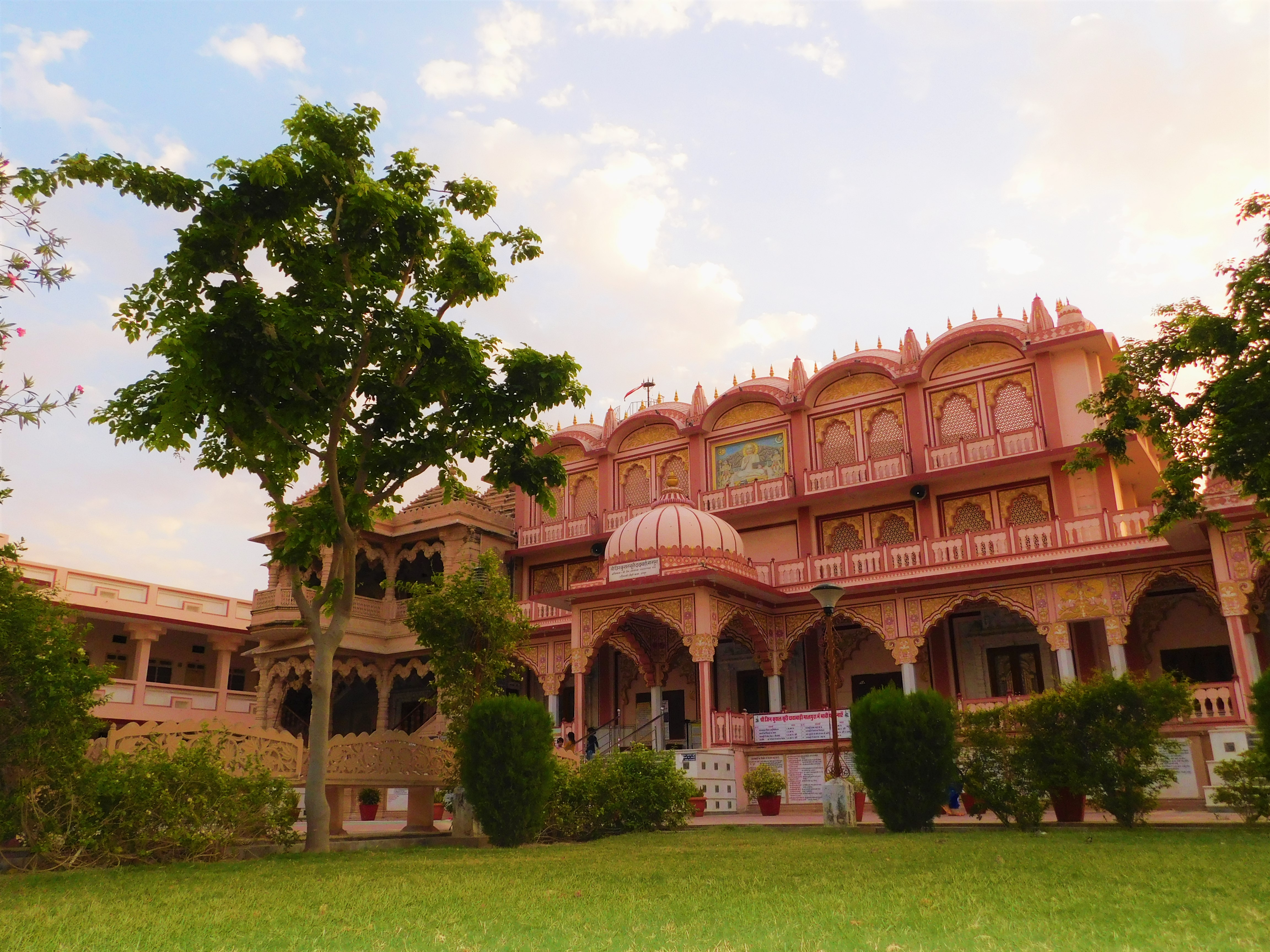
Dadabari in Malpura

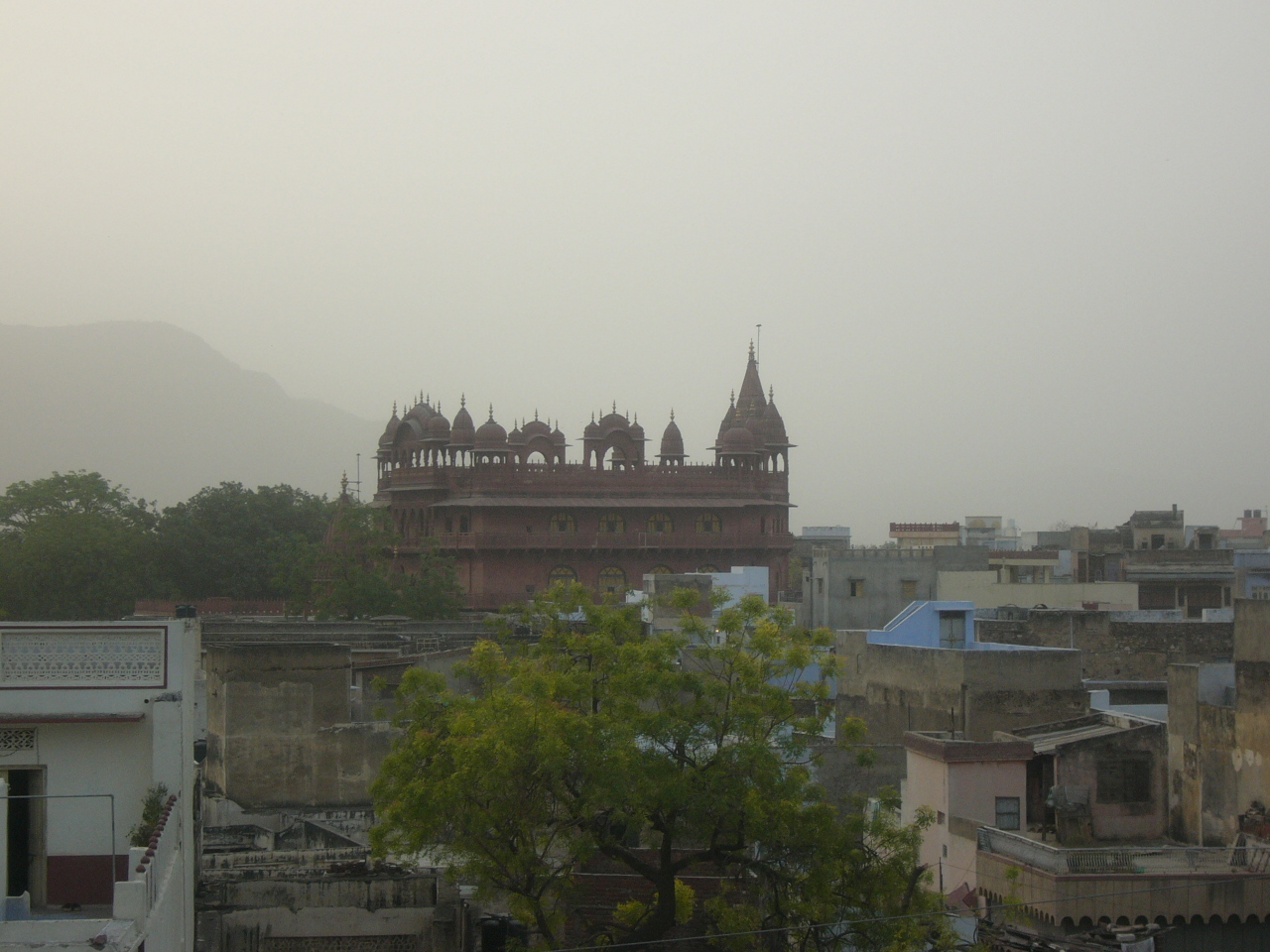
Dadabari in Ajmer

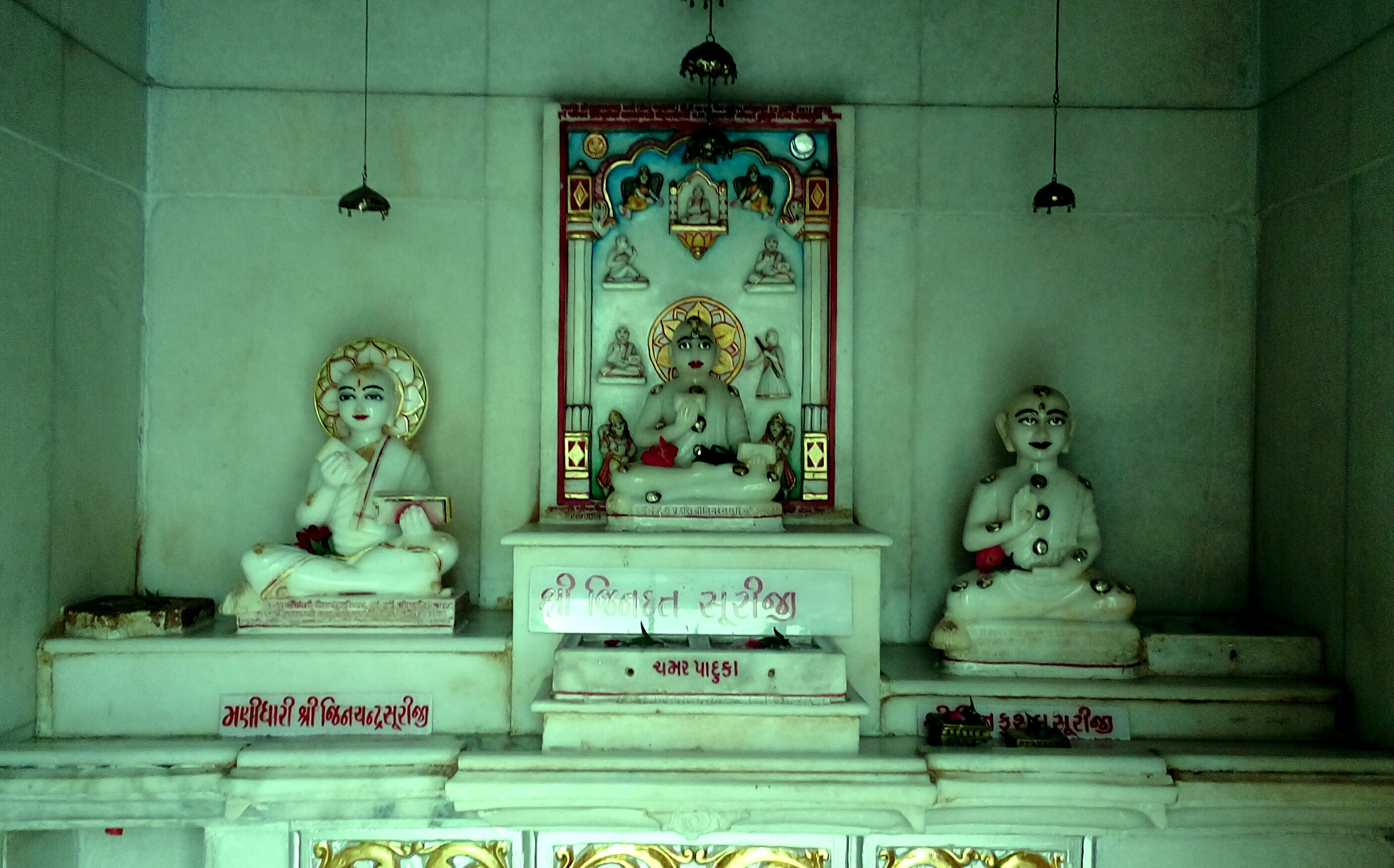
Dada Gurus of Kharatara Gaccha; Jinadatta Suri (centre) Jinakushal Suri (right) and Jinachandra Suri Manidhari (left)

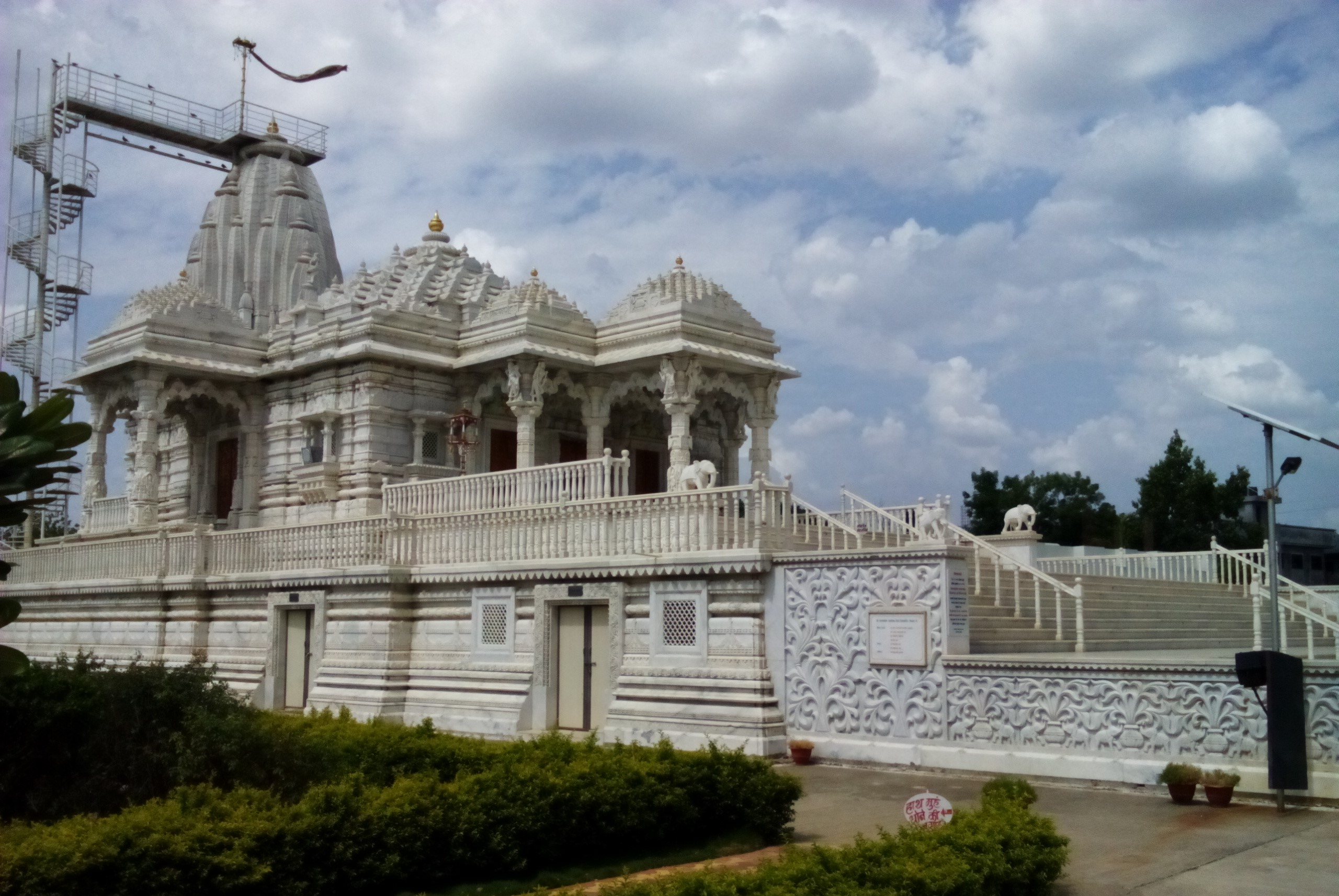
Jain Temple inside Dadawadi, Jalgaon

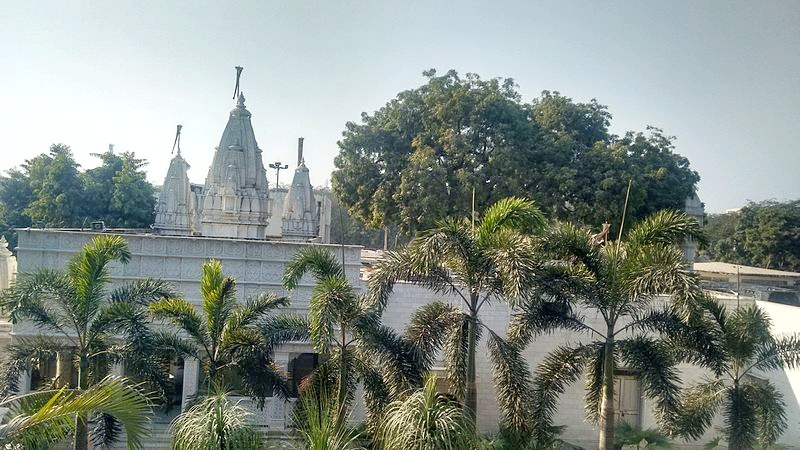
Dadabari, Mehrauli

== See also ==
- List of Jain temples
