= Jinakuśalasūri =

Third Dādā Guru of the Kharatara Gaccha tradition

- Title: Dadaguru

Religious life
- Religion: Jainism
- Sect: Śvetāmbara; Kharataragaccha (Dadabadi)

Religious career
- Post: Third dadaguru
- Predecessor: Jinacandrasūri I
- Successor: Jinacandrasūri II

Jinakuśalasūri (1280 – 1332 or 1352), also transliterated as Jin Kushal Suri or Jin Kushal Suraj, popularly known as Dadaji, was a Marwari Jain missionary and scholar of the Kharataragaccha tradition of Śvetāmbara Jainism who preached in the northwest Indian subcontinent. He was the leader of the Kharataragaccha tradition from 1321 to 1333. He served as the third dādāguru.

== Biography ==
Jinakuśalasūri was born Karmaṇa in 1280, in Garh Sivana AKA Samiyana village in the Marwar region of Rajasthan, to parents Jaisal Chajer, a minister, and Jayantshri. His teacher (vidyāguru) was Vivekasamudragaṇi, whom he consecreated a memorial shrine for. In 1290, Jinakuśalasūri received initiation by Jinacandra Suri and became known as Kuśalakīrti. By 1310, he was bestowed with the title Vācanācārya by Jinacandra Suri. In 1319, Jinacandra died so Jinakuśalasūri became the next Suri at Patan. His visit to Patan, passing through Kanyanayana, Narhad, Phalodhi, Marukota, Nagaur, Merta, Jalor, and Srimala, to get there, was taken care of by the Rajapati of Delhi. Upon the request of the congregation, he then reached Satrunjaya, where he initiated Yasodhara and Devendra as monks. Also, the image of Neminatha was installed and the images of Jinapati Suri and Jinesvara Suri were consecrated, also on Nandisvaramahotsava Sukhakirtigani was conferred with the Vācanācārya title. Then, he returned to Patan, where in 1324 Viratamahotsava was celebrated under his purview. Furthermore, murtis of the tirthankars and archaryas were sent to Jalor, Devarajapura, and Satrunjaya. Later, he was called to Bhimapally by a sravaka monk of Bhumapalli for the purpose of joining the congregation to Satrunjaya. He was at the consecration ceremony of the Vira Caitya at Bhimapalli and also visited the celebrations at Cintamani Parsvanatha temple at Jaisalmer and the Parsvanatha temple at Jalor. Jinakuśalasūri was knowledgeable in the topics of grammar, law, literature, prosody, astronomy, and magic but not much literature is attributed to him.

Jinakuśalasūri was invited by the sravakas of Sindh to conduct missionary work in the region, a request he obliged to. When he arrived, he established the pratistha, vratagahana, mularopana, and nandimahotsava ceremonies. He preached along the length of the Indus River from V.S. 1384 (c. 1327–1328 CE) to 1389 (c. 1332–1333 CE). Many of the Jain merchants who settled west of the Rann of Kutch came under the influence of him due to his preaching in Multan and the other settlements in the southern Indus Valley region of Punjab. He became sick with fever during the rainy-season and died in Devarājapura, Derāur (present-day Derawar in Bahawalpur) in 1332 or 1352, where a stupa-samadhi structure was built over his ashes dedicated to him. Furthermore, a dādābāṛī was erected.

== Legacy ==
There are stutis, stotras, padas and chandas dedicated to him which have been composed. He remains a venerated figure of the Svagaccha, Paragaccha, Sthanakavasi, and Terapanthi traditions. According to local lore, his shrine in Derawar was known for its miraculous properties. Furthermore, it acted as a dādābāṛī centre for further Jain missionary activity in Halla, Multan, Dera Ghazi Khan, Lahore, and Narowal. During the partition of India in 1947, some of his memorial remains were shifted to Derāur Dādābāṛī near Jaipur, Rajasthan. Inscribed silver foot-prints of Jinakuśalasūri are present at the in-house shrine (Ghara-derāsara) of Lābhacanda Seṭha, Police Hospital Road, Calcutta. As per Duggaṛ (1979), the term Bhabra originates from the name of a village south of Lahore called Bhāvaṛā, where Karam Chand Bachhawat installed a foot-image (caraṇa-bimba) of Jinakuśalasūri, that was the local focus of the popular dādābāṛī cult.
