= Kharatara Gaccha =

One of Śvetāmbara Murtipujaka gacchas

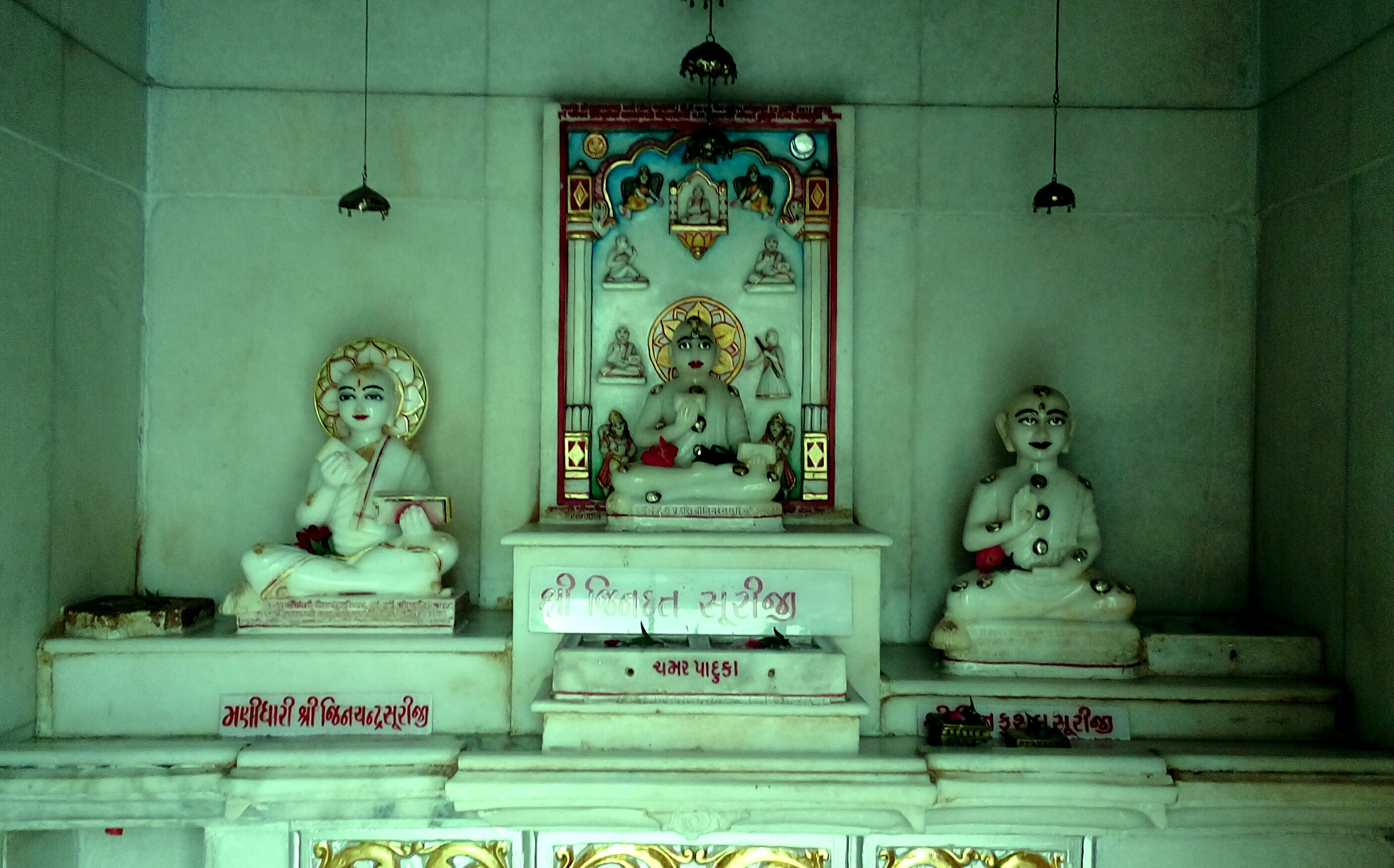
Dada Gurus of Kharatara Gaccha; Jinadatta Suri (centre), Jinakushal Suri (right) and Jinachandra Suri Manidhari (left)

Kharatara Gaccha is one of Śvetāmbara Murtipujaka Gacchas. It is also called the Vidhisangha (the Assembly) or Vidhimarga (Path of Proper Conduct), as they regard their practices as scripturally correct.

== History ==
Kharatara Gaccha was founded by Vardhamana Sūri (till 1031 CE). His pupil, Jineshvara (the author of Nivvāṇalīlāvaīkahā), got honorary title 'Kharatara' (Sharp witted or Fierce) because he defeated Suracharya, leader of Chaityavasis in public debate in 1024 CE at Anahilvada Patan. So the Gaccha also got his title. Khartara also means that "which is beyond" (tara) "purity" (khara), that is, being upright with the absolute truth, by following the religious scriptures without deviation (Jain Agamas) as it is. Another tradition regards Jinadatta Suri (1075―1154) as a founder of Gaccha.

Jinavallabha realised the difference between texts and words of teachers and put emphasis on sacred texts in Kharatara doctrine in the eleventh century. He wrote the Crown of Assembly.

== Dādābadī/Dādābāṛī tradition ==
The following four are known as Dada Guru in the sect and are venerated as spiritual guides.

- Jinadatta Sūri (1075―1154 CE), is the most famous ascetic of Gaccha who won converts in Sindh. After his death at Ajmer, a monument was erected there and the place is known as Dadabari.
- Maṇidhārī Jinachandra Sūri (1140―1166 CE)
- Jinakushal Sūri (1279–1331) gained many converts in western India.
- Jinachandra Sūri II (1537―1612) visited Lahore in 1591, where he convinced Akbar to stop Muslim attack on Jain temples.

== Doctrines ==
Kharatara ascetics regard their practices as scripturally correct. They follow basic Śvetāmbara canon and works of other Kharatara teachers.

== Adherents ==
Ascetics: 193 nuns, 19 monks in 1986 or 50-75 monks and 300 nuns. Large number of its lay followers reside in Rajasthan and West Bengal states of India.

== Literary contributions ==
Several members of Kharatara Gaccha were notable writers:

- Abhayachandra (before 1500 CE), a pupil of Ananda-raya, wrote a Prakrit-language astrological treatise titled Ulluntha-vadi-mukha-kilaka.
- Kshama-kalyana, a pupil of Amrta-dharma, wrote Dvadasha-masa-vyakhyana
- Jina-prabha-suri (c. 1261-1333) wrote a number of works, including the Vividha Tirtha Kalpa
- Jina-ratna-suri (13th century) wrote Lilavati-sara

== See also ==
- Tapa Gaccha
- Tristutik Gaccha
- Jain schools and branches
