= Vila (surname) =

Vila (Eastern Catalan: [ˈbilə], Galician: [ˈbilɐ], Occitan: [ˈbilɔ, ˈvilɔ], Portuguese: [ˈvilɐ]) is a common Spanish and Portuguese surname in Catalan, Galician, Occitan and Portuguese that means 'village' or 'farm'. Other spellings: Villa, Villar, Vilar, Vilares, Villares, Villalta, Villalba.

- Alexis Vila (born 1971), Cuban wrestler, mixed martial artist and murderer
- Andrés Rodríguez Vila (born 1973), Uruguayan chess grandmaster
- Andy Vila (born 1987), Uruguayan actress, model and television presenter
- Antonia Vila (1815–1870), Spanish printer and publisher
- Arben Vila (born 1960), Albanian footballer
- Artan Vila (born 1970), Albanian footballer
- Begoña Vila (born 1963), Spanish astrophysicist
- Bob Vila (born 1946), American television show host
- Carlos Rojas Vila (1928–2020), Spanish writer
- Carlos Torres Vila (banker) (born 1966), Spanish banker
- Carlos Torres Vila (musician) (1946–2010), Argentine folk singer
- Carme Vilà (born 1937), Catalan pianist
- Cirilo Vila (1937–2015), Chilean composer, pianist, and academic
- Daniel Vila (born 1953), Argentine businessman
- Dídac Vilà (born 1989), Spanish footballer
- Diogo Vila (born 1990), Portuguese footballer
- Elena Vila (born 1983), Spanish politician
- Emilio Vilà (1887–1967), Spanish artist and poster illustrator
- Emiljano Vila (born 1988), Albanian footballer
- Enrique Vila-Matas, Spanish writer
- Eric Vila (born 1998), Spanish basketball player
- Ernesto Vila (1936–2025), Uruguayan visual artist
- Florian Vila, Albanian chess master
- Irma Vila (1916–1993), Musical artist
- Jaime Vila, Spanish sportsperson
- Joan Eloi Vila (1959–2021), Spanish musician
- Joe Vila (1866–1934), American sportswriter and editor
- Jonathan Vila (born 1986), Spanish footballer
- José Vila (1926–2001), Spanish alpine skier
- José María Vargas Vila (1860–1933), Colombian writer
- Josefa Vila (born 1997), Chilean rower
- Juan Vila, Spanish sailor
- Juan Dotras Vila (1900–1978), Spanish composer
- Judith Tortosa Vila (born 2005), Spanish para-athlete
- Lídia Armengol i Vila (1948–1991), Andorran historian, civil servant
- Lorenco Vila (born 1998), Albanian footballer
- Lucas Vila (born 1986), Argentine field hockey player
- Lucas Ferraz Vila (born 1998), Argentine professional footballer
- Luis Vila (born 1992), Argentine footballer
- Luís Blanco Vila (1936–2023), Spanish journalist
- Manuel Pérez Vila (1922–1991), Venezuelan historian
- Margalida Caimari Vila, Spanish poet (1839-1921)
- María Inés Silva Vila (1926–1991), Uruguayan writer
- Marian Vayreda i Vila (born 1853), Catalan writer, soldier and activist
- Marika Vila (born 1949), Spanish comics artist and writer
- Martí Vilà (born 1999), Spanish footballer
- Martinho da Vila (born 1938), Brazilian singer and composer
- Matías Vila (born 1979), Argentine field hockey player
- Mauro Vila (born 1986), Uruguayan footballer
- Mayra Vila (born 1960), Cuban javelin thrower
- Mercedes Vila, Spanish researcher and physicist
- Montserrat Vilà, Spanish ecologist
- Muhamet Vila, Albanian footballer
- Newton Estape Vila (1913–1980), Cuban photographer and journalist
- Patricia Vila (born 1972), Mexican synchronized swimmer
- Patxi Vila (born 1975), Spanish cyclist
- Pere Alberch Vila, Catalan Renaissance composer and organist
- Ramon Vila (footballer) (born 2002), Spanish footballer
- Rodrigo Vila (born 1981), Argentine field hockey player
- Rosalía Vila Tobella (born 1993), Spanish singer
- Salvador Vila (born 1969), Spanish hurdler
- Samuel Vila (1902–1992), Spanish pastor
- Santi Vila (born 1973), Spanish historian, politician and professor
- Santiago Vila i Vicente, Spanish historian and politician
- Teresa Vila (1931–2009), Uruguayan visual artist
- Tito Hoz de Vila (1949–2015), Bolivian politician, lawyer and businessperson (1949-2015)
- Víctor da Vila, Argentinian politician
