= Villa (surname) =

Villa is an Italian and Spanish surname (family name). Notable people with the surname include:

- Alexandre Villa (born 1983), Brazilian footballer
- David Villa (born 1981), Spanish footballer
- Edoardo Villa (1915–2011), Italian-South African artist
- Emmanuel Villa (born 1982), Argentine footballer
- Jake Vincent Villa, Filipino politician
- Javier Villa (born 1987), Spanish racing driver
- Joy Villa (born 1986), American singer
- Juan Villa (born 1999), Colombian footballer
- Juan Manuel Villa (1938–2025), Spanish footballer
- Marco Villa (born 1969), Italian cyclist
- Matilde Villa (born 2004), Italian basketball player
- Pancho Villa (1878–1923), Mexican revolutionary
- Ricardo Villa (born 1952), Argentine footballer
- Rodolfo Martín Villa (born 1934), Spanish politician
- Sebastián Villa (born 1992), Colombian diver
- Sebastián Villa Cano (born 1996), Colombian footballer
- Nova Villa (born 1946), veteran actress and comedian
- Tom Villa (1945-2023), American politician

== See also ==
- José Doroteo Arango Arámbula (1878–1923), Mexican revolutionary general known as Francisco/Pancho Villa
- Villa, a type of house
- Villas (disambiguation)
- Vila (disambiguation)
- Vilas (disambiguation)
- Villar (surname)
