= Vilas =

Vilas may refer to:

== People ==
Last name

- Armin Vilas (fl. 1970s), Austrian bobsledder
- Charles Nathaniel Vilas (died 1931), American philanthropist in New Hampshire for whom the Vilas Bridge was named
- Dane Vilas (born 1985), South African cricketer
- Faith Vilas (born 1952), American planetary scientist
- Guillermo Vilas (born 1952), Argentine tennis player
- Joseph Vilas (1832–1905), American politician in Wisconsin, cousin of William Freeman Vilas
- Levi Baker Vilas (1811–1879), American politician in Wisconsin, father of William Freeman Vilas
- Logan Archbold Vilas (1891–1976), American aviator
- Manuel Vilas, Spanish writer
- Margaret Van Pelt Vilas (1905–1995), American architect
- Mari Paz Vilas (born 1988), Spanish footballer
- María Vilas (born 1996), Spanish swimmer
- Martin S. Vilas (1870–1953), American lawyer, politician and author in Vermont
- William Frederick Vilas (1853–1930), Canadian politician in Quebec
- William Freeman Vilas (1840–1908), American politician in Wisconsin, son of Levi Baker Vilas
- Xosé Neira Vilas (1928–2015), Galician writer

First name

- Vilas Ghogre (1947–1997), Indian activist, poet, and artist
- Vilas Muttemwar (born 1949), Indian politician
- Vilas Potnis, Indian politician
- Vilas Rupawate (born 1967), Indian politician
- Vilas Adinath Sangave (1920–2011), Indian sociologist and Jainologist
- Vilas Sarang (1942–2015), Indian writer, critic and translator
- Vilas Sawant, Indian politician
- Vilas Tare, Indian politician
- Vilasrao Deshmukh (1945–2012), Indian politician, former chief minister of Maharashtra
- Vilasrao Gundewar, Indian politician
- Vilas Muttemwar, Indian politician
- Vilasrao Narayan Jagtap, Indian politician

Middle name

- André Vilas Boas (born 1983), Portuguese footballer
- Ram Vilas Paswan (1946–2020), Indian politician
- Ram Vilas Sharma (1912–2000), Indian literary critic, linguist, poet and thinker
- Charles V. Truax (1887–1935), American politician in Ohio
- Ram Vilas Vedanti (born 1958), Indian politician and Hindu religious leader

== Places ==
=== Communities ===
==== Portugal ====
- Towns in Portugal, as vilas means "villages" in Portuguese, may refer specifically to:
  - Vilas (Boticas), a civil parish in the municipality of Boticas

==== United States ====
- Vilas, Colorado, a statutory town in Baca County
- Vilas, Florida, an unincorporated community in Liberty County
- Vilas, Indiana, an unincorporated community in Franklin Township, Owen County
- Vilas, Kansas, an unincorporated community in Wilson County
- Vilas, North Carolina, an unincorporated community in Watauga County
- Vilas, South Dakota, a town in Miner County
- Vilas, Texas, an unincorporated community in Bell County
- Vilas, Wisconsin, a town in Langlade County
- Vilas (community), Dane County, Wisconsin, an unincorporated community located in the town of Cottage Grove
- Vilas County, Wisconsin

=== Landmarks and historic places ===
==== India ====
- Jai Vilas Mahal, a nineteenth-century palace in Gwalior
- Jayalakshmi Vilas, a heritage building in Mysore, Karnataka
- Lakshmi Vilas Palace, Vadodara, in Vadodara, Gujarat
- Rajendra Vilas, a palace-hotel atop Chamundi Hills in Mysore, Karnataka
- Vijaya Vilas Palace, in the town of Mandvi in the Kutch district of Gujarat

==== United States ====
- Henry Vilas Zoo, in Madison, Wisconsin, United States
- S. F. Vilas Home for Aged & Infirmed Ladies, in Clinton County, New York
- Vilas Bridge, over the Connecticut River between Vermont and New Hampshire
- Vilas Circle Bear Effigy Mound and the Curtis Mounds, in Madison, Wisconsin
- Vilas Park Mound Group, in Madison, Wisconsin
- Vilas Shale, a geologic formation in Kansas

== Other uses ==
- Bharatha Vilas, a 1973 Indian Tamil-language film
- Dalpat Vilas, a fragment of a historical manuscript written in the Rajasthani language
- Lakshmi Vilas Bank, an Indian bank from 1926 to 2020
- Ram Vilas Ganga Ram College, in Maharajganj, Siwan, Bihar, India
- Ranga Vilas, a 2013 Indian soap opera
- Sarada Vilas College, in Mysore, Karnataka, India
- Vilasrao Sarang, fictional character portrayed by Varun Badola in the 2025 Indian film War 2

== See also ==
- Bilas (disambiguation)
- Vila (disambiguation)
- Villas (disambiguation)
