= Francisco Lacueva =

Spanish theologian and writer

- Born: 28 September 1911; Sant Celoni, Province of Barcelona, Spain
- Died: 11 September 2005 (aged 93); Bath, Somerset, England
- Resting place: Malmesbury, Wiltshire, England
- Education: Pontifical University of Salamanca
- Occupation: Theologian
- Spouse: Enid-Beryle Beard
- Children: Francesca White, Raquel Shaddick, Alison Cave
- Writing career
- Language: Spanish
- Subjects: Dogmatic theology, Christian eschatology

Francisco Lacueva Lafarga (Sant Celoni, Barcelona, 28 September 1911 - Bath, Somerset, England, 11 September 2005) was a Spanish theologian and writer, renowned for his trajectory in the Roman Catholic Church and subsequent conversion to the evangelical faith.

== Biography ==
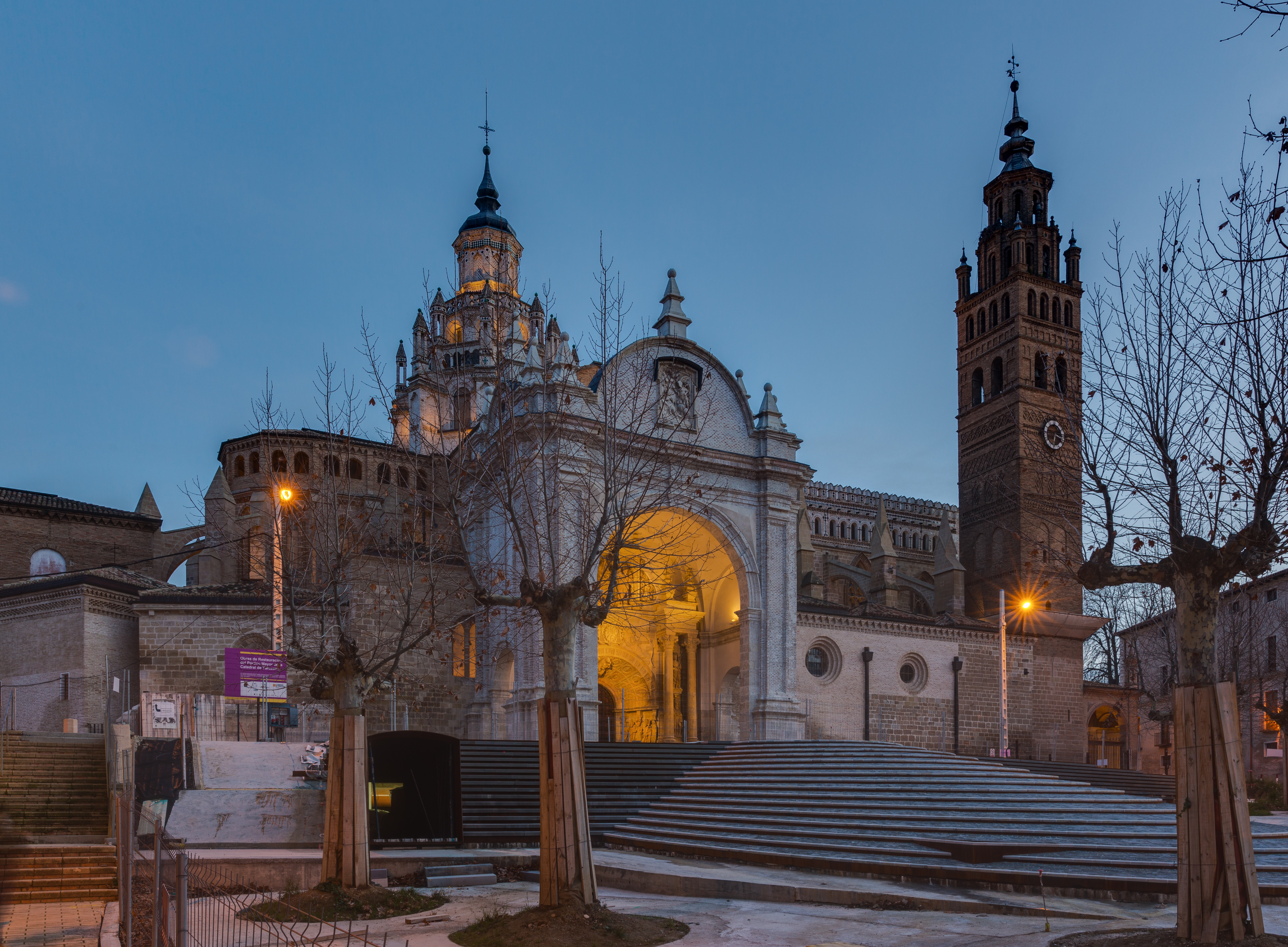
In the Tarazona Cathedral, before embracing the evangelical faith, Lacueva served as a coadjutor, professor, and magistral canon.

Born into a Catholic family, Lacueva initiated his priestly formation and earned a bachelor's and a doctorate in dogmatic theology from the Pontifical University of Salamanca. After holding various ecclesiastical positions, his life took a turn in late 1961 when, influenced by Pastor Samuel Vila, he converted to the evangelical faith.

Upon resigning from his ecclesiastical responsibilities, he moved to England, where he collaborated in spreading the Gospel through radio messages. His baptism at the Holland Road Baptist Church in Hove in June 1962 officially marked his new spiritual journey. Subsequently, he engaged in evangelization and teaching with various evangelical organizations, being sent as a missionary to Spain in 1969.

After periods in Guatemala and England, Lacueva settled in the Spanish city of Vigo, where, in addition to teaching at the Biblical Institute of Galicia, he delved into theological doctrines and the preparation of a Hebrew lexicon. Finally, following the death of his wife, he permanently relocated to England to live with his daughters.

If the Lord grants me a few more years of life —I'm about to turn 82—, I want to conduct research, entirely original —there is nothing on the subject—, on the Hebrew lexicon in its deepest roots.

== Contributions and works ==
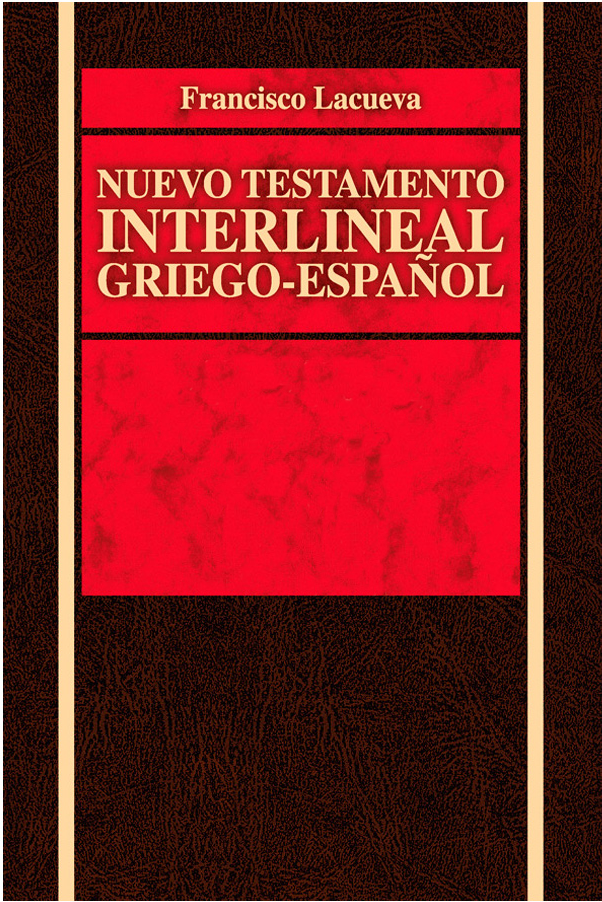
Greek-Spanish Interlinear New Testament: with the Greek text of Nestle

Lacueva stood out for his prolific literary and theological production, including works like the Greek-Spanish Interlinear New Testament, Trinitarian Spirituality, Doctrines of Grace, among others. His theological focus spanned from dispensational premillennial eschatology to soteriology, with an evolution in his doctrinal positions over the years.

His legacy endures in the influence he had as a writer and evangelical theologian. His autobiography, My Road to Damascus, and his involvement in the revision of the Reina-Valera 1977 are significant aspects of his impact on the Christian community.

[Lacueva] produced a prolific literary output, with the Greek-Spanish Interlinear New Testament, several volumes of the Evangelical Theological Formation series, and other theological works. He also collaborated as an editor of the Daily Notes of the Scripture Union from 1977 to 1981. His autobiography My Road to Damascus, where he recounts his conversion to the gospel, gained widespread attention, and in the latest edition, he expands on it, explaining that he had adopted a new theological stance.

— Pedro Puigvert, Theological Magazine

== Legacy and death ==
Lacueva died on 11 September 2005 in the English city of Bath, just a few days shy of his 94th birthday. His legacy endures through his writings and contributions to evangelical theology.
