= Villa (disambiguation) =

A villa is a house.

Villa may also refer to:

== Places ==
- Villa, Rõuge Parish, a village in Rõuge Parish, Võru County, Estonia
- Villa, Võru Parish, a village in Võru Parish, Võru County, Estonia
- Villa, Viljandi County, a village in Viljandi Parish, Viljandi County, Estonia
- Villa, Norway, an island in Flatanger municipality, Trøndelag county, Norway
- Villa (Saint Vincent), a city on the island of Saint Vincent
- Villa (Corvera), Asturias, Spain
- Villa (Illas), Illas, Asturias, Spain
- Villa, Ohio, an unincorporated community in the United States

== Other uses ==
- Roman villa, ancient Roman country house and estate
- Villa (surname)
- Villa (fly), a genus of bee flies
- The Villa, a Dutch reality television show
- Aso Villa or The Villa, official residence of the President of Nigeria
- Villa Maria College or Villa, a college in Buffalo, New York
- Aston Villa F.C. or Villa, an English Premier League football club
- Villa Lidköping BK, bandy club in Lidköping, Sweden
- SC Villa, an association football club from Uganda
- Villa (footballer) (born 1983), full name Rodrigo Augusto Sartori Costa, Brazilian footballer
- Pizza II: Villa, a 2013 Indian film
- Museum Villa, art museum in Amsterdam, Netherlands

== See also ==
- Villas (disambiguation)
