= Sant Celoni =

- Municipality
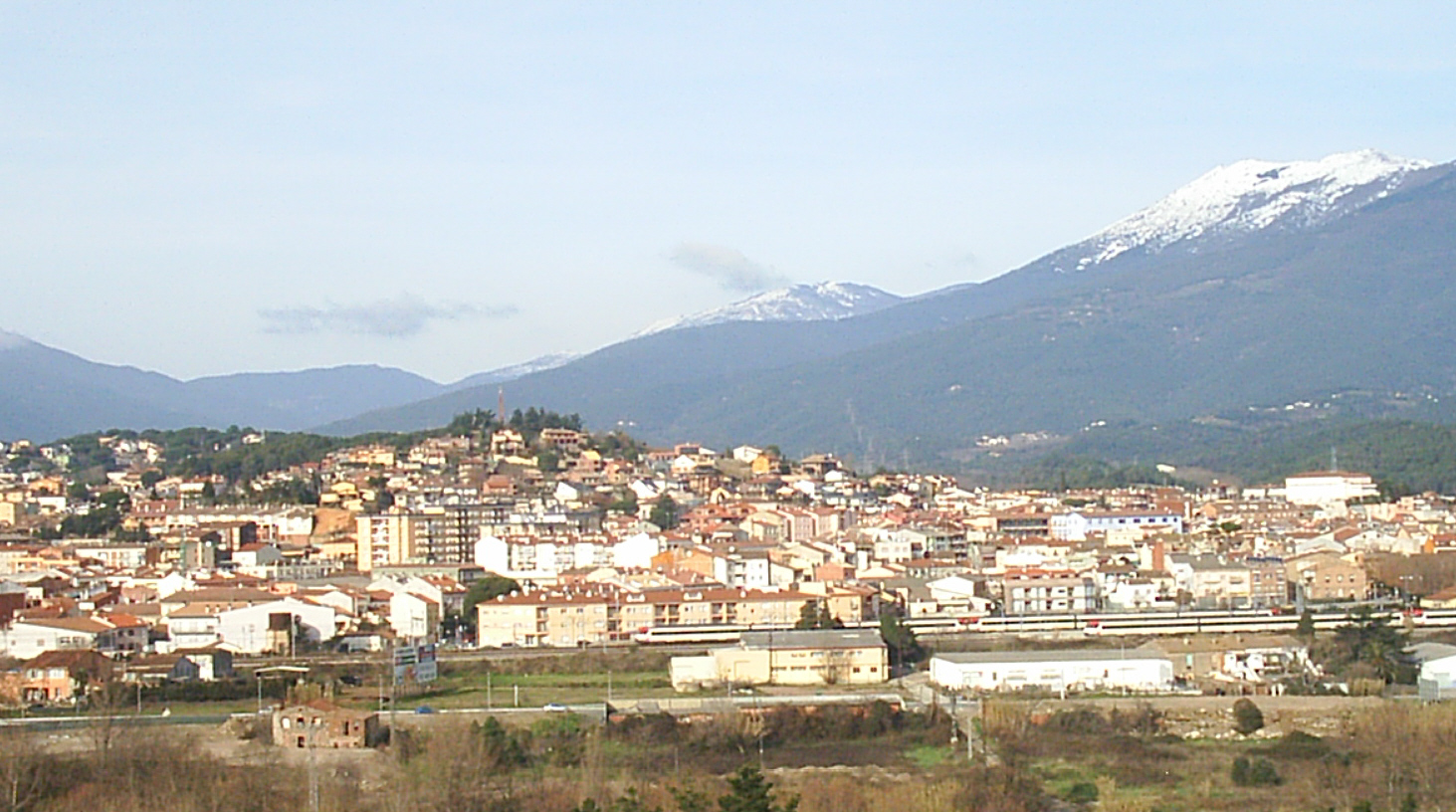
- View of Sant Celoni with the Montseny Massif in the background

- Flag Coat of arms

- Location in Catalonia Sant Celoni (Spain)
- Coordinates: 41°41′24″N 2°29′24″E
- Country: Spain
- Community: Catalonia
- Province: Barcelona
- Comarca: Vallès Oriental

Government
  - Mayor: Francesc Deulofeu Fontanillas (2015) (CIU)

Area
  - Total: 65.2 km^{2} (25.2 sq mi)
- Elevation: 152 m (499 ft)

Population (2025-01-01)
  - Total: 18,977
  - Density: 291/km^{2} (754/sq mi)
- Demonym(s): Celoní, celonina
- Website: santceloni.cat

Sant Celoni (Catalan pronunciation: [ˈsan səˈlɔni]) is a municipality in the comarca of the Vallès Oriental in Catalonia, Spain. It is situated in the valley of the Tordera river between the ranges of Montseny and Montnegre. The main part of the town is on the left bank of the river. The former municipalities of Montnegre and Olzinelles now form part of the municipality of sant Celoni, which has the largest area in the comarca. The municipality is served by the AP-7 Motorway and the C-251 road, as well as by a station on the Renfe railway line between Barcelona and Girona.

== Geography ==
The municipality of Sant Celoni comprises the town center, the most populated (17,076 inhabitants, 2012), plus come other group of scattered nuclei. The urban area of Pertegàs (260 inhabitants) is next to the town center, from which it is separated by the entrance road to Sant Celoni, connecting with the C-35 on the east side (Porta de Llevant). It is currently considered another neighborhood in the city center. Although it now occupies a peripheral situation, near its boundaries there is the church of Sant Martí de Pertegàs, which in fact was the original nucleus of the town. La Batllòria (1,097 inhabitants) is the most populated town outside the town center. It is located at the northern end of the municipality, next to Riells and Viabrea, from which it is separated by the C-35 road. Vilardell is a town around the church of Sant Llorenç, on the other side of the C-35 road and the AP7 motorway, at the foot of the Montnegre massif. The place was the scene of the legend of Soler de Vilardell and the dragon. The rest of the nuclei are more scattered, scattered within the Montnegre natural park, and with a smaller population: Olzinelles, in the south, near Vallgorguina, includes some farmhouses around the church of Sant Esteve; Fuirosos, to the east, includes a few farmhouses around the church of Sant Cebrià; and Montnegre, in the southeast, which includes some farmhouses around the church of Sant Martí de Montnegre.

All these nuclei of population, alone or grouped, constituted independent municipalities until they were integrated in Sant Celoni in the years ranging from 1930 to 1936. Montnegre had been the center of the Barony of Montnegre, and with this name it constituted an independent municipality, together with the towns of Fuirosos and the Batllòria, until the years 1932–36. For its part, Olzinelles also had its own municipality, along with Vilardell, until 1930.

In contrast to the depopulation caused by the abandonment of traditional activities (cultivation, grazing and those related to the exploitation of the forest), it is necessary to mention the appearance of different urbanizations within the Montnegre area from the second half of the twentieth century, which have gradually become nuclei of stable population: Can Coll (98 inhabitants), Cal Batlle (66) and the Boscos del Montnegre (237).

For its part, the town of Sant Celoni is divided into the following neighborhoods: Les Borrelles, Can Sans, Zona Residencial de les Torres, Illes Belles, Sant Ponç, El Pertegàs, Carrer Major de Baix or Barri de la Força, Carrer Mayor de Dalt or Barri Vilanova, Molí Paperer, Zona Residencial dels Esports, Turó Mare de Déu del Puig, Avinguda de la Pau, El Sot de les Granotes and Pla de Palau.

== History ==
The town of Sant Celoni was named after a chapel built towards the 11th century at the foot of the river Pertegàs. Sant Celoni is the translation from the Latin Sanctum Celedonium and Sancti Celedonii, which refers to Saint Celedonius. There have been many variations on the name through the centuries: Sancti Celidonia, Sant Celdoni, Sent Salony, Sanseloni, San Celoni.

Francesc Sabaté Llopart was killed in Sant Celoni in 1960.

== Economy ==
The agricultural sector has suffered a setback and a loss of importance over the years. The only farming reduces the crop of cereals and fodder.

The industry was capitalized on the economic growth of the Sant Celoni. The chemical industry has a strong presence in the town. There are also a large number of industries in the metal and electronics that have experienced strong growth in recent years. The high rate of business growth in the area has encouraged the development of new industrial estates, which in turn have led to the advent of industries that were not originally in the territory.

The construction has a strong presence in the area, which has experienced very significant growth in recent years.

In 2001, only 1.4% of the population was employed in agriculture, 11.1% in construction, 30.5% in industry and what is more important are the services with 57%.

== Demography ==
1900	1930	1950	1970	1986	2012
3,301	4,192	4,923	9,325	11,275	17,076

== Communications ==
The town of Sant Celoni has good communication links. The AP-7 motorway, the C-35 trunk road, and a railway link Sant Celoni to the rest of Catalonia and France. There is also a reasonable bus network.

== Notable people ==
- Francisco Lacueva (1911-2005), Spanish missionary, writer, theologian, teacher, pastor, and canon
