= Villas =

Villas may refer to:

== Places ==
- Villas, Florida, United States
- Villas, Illinois, United States
- Villas, New Jersey, United States
- Las Villas, a region of Spain
- Las Villas (Cuba), a former Cuban Province
- The Villas, a housing estate in Stoke-upon-Trent, England

== Other uses ==
- Villa, a type of house
- Villa (fly), a genus of insects
- The Villas (band), an American rock band
- Violetta Villas (1938–2011), Belgian-born Polish singer, actress, and songwriter

== See also ==
- Las Tres Villas
- Cinco Villas (disambiguation)
- Castillo Siete Villas, a town in Arnuero, Cantabria, Spain
- Villasbuenas
- Villas Boas
- Benalúa de las Villas
- Villa (disambiguation)
- Vila (disambiguation)
- Vilas (disambiguation)
