= Vila =

Vila may refer to:

== People ==
- Vila (surname)

== Places ==
=== Andorra ===
- Vila, Andorra, a town in the parish of Encamp

=== Brazil ===
- Vila Bela da Santíssima Trindade, a municipality in the State of Mato Grosso
- Vila Boa, Goiás, a municipality in the State of Goiás
- Vila Flores, a municipality in Rio Grande do Sul
- Vila Flor, a municipality in Rio Grande do Norte
- Vila Império, a urbanized neighborhood in Minas Gerais.
- Vila Lângaro, a municipality in Rio Grande do Sul
- Vila Maria (district of São Paulo), a municipality in Rio Grande do Sul
- Vila Nova do Piauí, a municipality of Piauí
- Vila Nova dos Martírios, a municipality of Maranhão
- Vila Nova do Sul, a municipality in Rio Grande do Sul
- Vila Pavão, a municipality in Espírito Santo
- Vila Propício, a municipality in the State of Goiás
- Vila Rica, a municipality in the State of Minas Gerais
- Vila Valério, a municipality in Espírito Santo
- Vila Velha, a municipality in Espírito Santo

=== Estonia ===
- Vila, Estonia, village in Haljala Parish, Lääne-Viru County

=== Mozambique ===
- Vila Pery, former name of the city of Chimoio

=== Portugal ===
- Vila (Melgaço), a civil parish in the municipality of Melgaço
- Vila do Bispo, a municipality in the district of Faro
- Vila do Conde, a municipality in the district of Porto
- Vila Franca de Xira, a municipality in the district of Lisbon
- Vila Nova de Famalicão, a municipality in the district of Braga
- Vila Nova de Gaia, a municipality in the district of Porto
- Vila Real, a municipality of district of Vila Real
- Vila Real de Santo António Municipality, a municipality in the district of Faro

==== Archipelago of the Azores ====
- Vila Franca do Campo (Azores), a municipality on the island of São Miguel
- Vila do Porto (Azores), a municipality on the island of Santa Maria

=== Solomon Islands ===
- Vila, Solomon Islands, a site at the southern end of Kolombangara (Solomon Islands); notable as the site of a Japanese airstrip in World War II

=== Spain ===
- La Vila Joiosa (known as La Vila), municipality and capital of the comarca of Marina Baixa, Spain
- Vila-real, municipality of the province of Castellón, Spain
- Vila d'Eivissa (known in English as "Ibiza Town"), capital of Ibiza Island, Spain
- Vila de Cruces, municipality of Pontevedra, Spain

=== Vanuatu ===
- Port Vila, capital of Vanuatu

== Other ==
- Vila (album), a 2009 album by Emina Jahović
- Vila (butterfly), a butterfly genus
- Vila (fairy), nymphs in Slavic mythology
- Vila Restal, fictional character from the television serial Blake's 7
- Dalmat (yacht), which carried the name Vila between 1943 and 1945

== See also ==
- Vilas (disambiguation)
- Villa, originally an ancient Roman upper-class country house
- Villas (disambiguation)
