= Dalpat Vilas =

Historical source of Mughal-Rajput relations

The Dalpat Vilas is the surviving fragment of a historical manuscript. Written in the Rajasthani language, it is the earliest known Charan source of Mughal-Rajput relations. The initial portion of the manuscript covers the genealogy of the Rathores (of Marwar) and the Sur dynasty. The bulk of the manuscript chronicles events in Marwar and adjoining areas during the reign of Akbar.

== Authorship ==
The author of the Dalpat Vilas remains unknown. It can be inferred that he was probably a Vaishnavite-leaning Charan or a Vaishnav Brahman as in the manuscript Keshvaraya (Vishnu) is said to have protected princes Dalpat and Bhopat.

== Prince Dalpat ==
The eponymous Prince Dalpat was a Rajput of the Rathore clan and a scion of Bika (the founder of Bikaner). In the manuscript, Bika is referred to as Vikramaditya. Dalpat's father was Maharaja Rai Singh of Bikaner. Rai Singh was in turn, the grandson of Jaitsingh (a grandson of Bika).

== Period of authorship ==
The Dalpat Vilas was probably written during Maharaja Rai Singh's rule in the period 1579–1612 C.E.

== Events chronicled in the Dalpat Vilas ==
=== Jaitsingh’s death ===
Jaitsingh was killed in a battle with Maldev of Jodhpur. Jaitsingh's son, Kalyanmal was in the wilderness until he received the assistance of Sher Shah Suri. Jaitsi's father, Rav Lunkaran had previously given shelter to Sher Shah. Sher Shah gave Bayana, Hissar, Rewari and Mewat to Kalyanmal and later defeated Maldev. Kalyanmal was thus finally able to rule from Bikaner.

=== The Sur Dynasty ===
Writing of the Sur dynasty, the manuscript states that Sher Shah died of injuries suffered during the siege of Kalinjar. Sher Shah's son, Salem (Islam) Khan was succeeded by Firoz Shah. The young boy was killed by Sher Shah's nephew (Mubariz) Khan. Mamrez Khan reportedly went insane after the crime and his vakil (minister) Hemu seized power.

=== Second battle of Panipat ===
The death of Humayun, Akbar's coronation at Kalanaur, Hemu's capture of Delhi and Hemu's defeat at Panipat are briefly mentioned. Hemu (also called Vasant Raya) is said to have been killed, not by Akbar but by his nobles Bairam Khan and Bali Beg. Kalyanmal of Bikaner is said to have agreed to receive Bairam Khan (after he rebelled against Akbar) while Rana Udaysimha (of Mewar) and Maldev of Jodhpur refused to do so.

=== Marriage of Rai Singh ===
The next event mentioned is the marriage of Prince Rai Singh to Jaswant-de, the daughter of Rana Udaysimha. Prince Bhopat and Prince Dalpat were the two sons from this marriage.

=== Akbar’s visit to Nagaur ===
Described next is a ceremony at Nagaur in 1570 C.E., where Akbar married two princesses from Bikaner, Bhanumati (daughter of Bhimraj) and Raj Kanwari (daughter of Kanhaji). Kalyanmal was sent for by Akbar, and left his son, Rai Singh with the emperor. Akbar also received Maldev's son Chandrasen. Rawal Hariraj of Jaisalmer is said to have sent his daughter (with Bhagwant Das Kachhwaha) to Akbar. Udaya Singh, ruler of Sirohi, came to promote his claim (as older brother of Chandrasen) to be ruler of Marwar. Udaya Singh's visit is not mentioned by the Dalpat Vilas. Kalyanmal later received Jodhpur as a jagir from Akbar, he entrusted the fort to Rai Singh. In the interim, Udaya Singh had died and the new ruler, Rav Man had killed Udaya Singh's wife Pushpavati ( the sister of Rai Singh). In 1572, Rai Singh retaliated by attacking and sacking Sirohi.

=== Akbar’s Gujarat campaigns ===
Akbar led an expedition to Gujarat where Tamat Khan reportedly gave Akbar the keys to Gujarat (in reality just Ahmedabad). Akbar then conquered Surat and defeated Ibrahim Husain Mirza near Kathoti. Akbar then returned to Fatehpur Sikri with Rai Singh joining him en route in Ajmer. After a year, Rai Singh set out to crush Muhammad Shahs' rebellion in Gujarat; Akbar joined the campaign in Jalor. For his services, Akbar rewarded Rai Singh with Nagaur, Sirsa and Marot. Prince Dalpat was put in charge of Sirsa.

=== Kalyanmal’s death ===
Around this time Kalyanmal, Bharmal and Narayan (a son of Bhimraj) died. Rai Singh then became ruler of Bikaner and Bhagwantdas the ruler of Amber. Seizing the opportunity, Dalpat took Hardesar and expelled Bhimraj's family.

=== Siege of Siwana ===
Rai Singh (along with Shah Quli Khan and others) was assigned the task of capturing Siwana. The fort was being defended by Pata, brother-in-law of Rai Singh's minister, Karam Chand Bachhawat. He allowed supplies into the fort and sabotaged the siege. Meanwhile, Rai Singh's brother, Ram Singh defeated Chandrasen of Jodhpur at the battle of Kulanja valley. Akbar sent Shahbaz Khan to Siwana and instructed Rai Singh to return to the court. Shahbaz Khan cut off the supplies and captured the fort.

=== Karam Chand’s maneuverings ===
The Dalpat Vilas then delves into the ongoing intrigues in Bikaner. Friction is said to be present between Mantri Karam Chand and Rai Singh's mother with the minister keeping Rai Singh away from his mother. Karam Chand also sowed seeds of discord between Rai Singh and Prince Bhopat. After the Maharani herself brought Bhopat from Nagaur, the angry Rai Singh divested Bhopat of most of his retinue. Bhopat was sent to Bikaner in 1575 C.E. but after a good start he took to a life of profligate spending and drinking. When Rai Singh was visiting Bhadana, the Maharani brought the drunken Bhopat before his father. The enraged Rai Singh apparently appointed Ram Singh as Bhopat's guardian and sent them to Bikaner; Rai Singh proceeded to meet Akbar. Mahesh, Gogade and Jivraj (Bhopat's nobles) were assigned to accompany Dalpat instead.

Karam Chand continued his efforts to bring harm to Bhopat. The prince had a poor appetite and Karam Chand appointed a physician to cure the problem by branding. In 1576, a hot iron was stated to have been applied to Bhopat's stomach. A similar branding was planned for the prince's back but was prevented by the prince's attendants. Despite all these machinations, Bhopat regained his health.

=== Rai Singh’s move to Merta ===
In 1578 C.E., Rai Singh requested Akbar that to be allowed to swap Merta for Jodhpur. Akbar assented and went to Malwa with Prince Bhopat. Prince Dalpat joined the Maharaja as he proceeded to Merta. On the way, Rai Singh stopped at Kantalya and raided Bansor. Dalpat Singh was then sent to Bikaner while Rai Singh sacked Chotila and Rohis. Dalpat went to Badhnau to have a feast at Ram Singh's house. The Prince then stayed at Kalyanpur for five days and joined Surtan, Prithiraj (brothers of Rai Singh) and assembled thakurs in a game of Chaugan. Dalpat then returned to Badhnau.

=== Keshav’s intemperate behavior ===
The manuscript states that in this interim, the Jats of Nawa killed Mahesh. Many jats were then killed in revenge by Keshav, one of Ram Singh's Rajputs (nobles). Informed of this, Prince Dalpat rushed to intercept Keshav and reached Bigga. Keshav, however, had already returned to Kalyanpur and Dalpat returned to Bikaner. When Ram Singh and his brothers went to Sirohi, Keshav was asked to stay behind. Keshav, however, refused to obey and was allowed to join the party. Upon reaching Pali, Ram Singh wished for Keshav to proceed to Kumbhalmer and be assigned to Bhanji. Keshav again flouted the command and Ram Singh did not force the issue.

=== Friction between Ram Singh and Rai Singh ===
At Sirohi, Surtan (a thakur from Sirohi) had come to visit Maharaja Rai Singh. Surtan and Prince Bhopat were sent by Rai Singh to Akbar. Ram Singh and Prithiraj attended a feast hosted by Bija Deora. Ram Singh's partaking of a feast with Pushpavati's killers angered Rai Singh. He communicated his displeasure to Ram Singh and said that it would be difficult for him to live with his brother. In order to fulfill Rai Singh's wish, Ram Singh left Sirohi. After going only part of the way home, Ram Singh sent a message asking for forgiveness. Rai Singh relented and Ram Singh returned to Sirohi.

=== Keshav’s continued impertinence ===
Maharaja Rai Singh took his savars (horsemen) for inspection by Akbar's Bakshi. At the inspection. Ram Singh's horsemen followed the protocol by dismounting, leading the horses by the reins, saluting and circling back. Keshav, however, did not dismount and merely galloped away. Rai Singh gave orders for Keshav to be killed but he escaped by staying close to Ram Singh. This led to Ram Singh also becoming the target of Rai Singh's wrath. At this point, the Maharani, not wishing to see fratricide, sent Ram Singh away.

=== Trouble with Amra ===
Amra (a brother of Rai Singh) had been stealing camels belonging to the Emperor. Dalpat was sent by Rai Singh to have the camels freed and Amra expelled. Dalpat did not find Amra at Sidhu and went to Badhsar and rounded up some of Raghodas' men (Raghodas was a son of Kalyanmal). The men were released after some mild punishment. Rai Singh again sent word to Dalpat that the Amra matter had to be dealt with. Dalpat went to sack Amra's village and gave the residents opportunity to leave. After the offer was refused, a short skirmish followed and Dalpat's victorious force set fire to the village. Ram Singh and Amra were meanwhile headed from Bikaner after leaving Rai Singh. The news of Amra's village being attacked reached the duo, Amra wished to return to his village. Ram Singh, however, sent a communication to Prince Dalpat and headed to Nohar with the pack animals.

=== Amba’s death and its repercussions ===
Ram Singh became disillusioned with the world after his wife Amba (daughter of Rana Uday Singh) died. Ram Singh had asked Surtan and Prithiraj to cease their depredations in Bikaner. Surtan and Prithiraj, however, continued to seize animals from villagers. Ram Singh decided to end his life like a true Rajput by dying in battle. Dalpat's advisers also wished to get rid of Ram Singh. After inciting Dalpat through invectives, Ram Singh reached Rajadwala. Dalpat's forces attacked and the valorous Ram Singh was killed. Prithiraj and Surtan were allowed by Dalpat to take their possessions to Nohar. After a few days, Prithiraj, Surtan and Amra resumed atrocities in the Bhatner area. Dalpat sent a force against them, but Prithiraj and Surtan went to plead their case before the Emperor. Akbar summoned Dalpat and the prince went to the Imperial court. After returning to Bikaner, the young prince married the daughters of Rupsi and Chauhan Ramdas. Dalpat then joined Akbar's retinue near Rewari. Akbar proceeded to visit several towns, Prince Bhopat was left at Tehad after he developed smallpox. News of Prince Bhopat's death arrived as Akbar reached Shekana-pattan.

=== The Qamargah hunt ===
Akbar next traveled via Chandnot (Chiniot) and Hazara to Bhere (Bhera), there animals for the hunt had been collected near Girjhak (present day Jalalpur). While Akbar went deer hunting, the nobles played a game of kabaddi dressed in their kachhas (underwear). Upon returning from the hunt, the Emperor did not join the game but went to the tent of Shekh Jamal. All the nobles dressed and went to pay their respects to Akbar. After some time, Akbar went to bathe in the river (the Jhelum). Akbar's son, Salim was hesitant to enter the river. Akbar, therefore, dunked Salim in the river a few times. The Rajput noble, Danji received four to five lashes from Akbar's whip as he was late. Pritihidip and his advisers also felt the sting of Akbar's whip. Randhirot (Prithidip's uncle) was also whipped as it was found that he had detained Prithidip. Upon being whipped, Randhirot stabbed himself in the belly. Akbar was further enraged and ordered Randhirot to be trampled to death by an elephant. This order could not be carried out as the elephant did not move to trample Randhirot.

At this juncture, the irritated Akbar went to enjoy the company of his ladies. The nobles also returned to their respective tents. Man Singh arrived at the camp in the afternoon and went to pay his respects to Akbar. Akbar told Man Singh to have Randhirot looked after, however, the Rajput was already dead.

Dalpat, Man Singh and Madhav Singh went to see the Emperor and found him to be in a foul mood. Akbar reportedly started shouting and said that Hindus should eat cows and Muslims should eat pigs. He also took off his turban and asked for a barber to shave his head. The panic stricken barber ran away and Akbar started to trim his own hair with a dagger. Shah Fatahulla intervened and took the dagger from Akbar's hand. All the assembled Muslim and Rajput nobles were then ordered to take off their turbans. The Emperor then had his hair cropped and started shouting again. He praised the Rathores and Rajawats but called the Shekhawats mere Jats. With difficulty, Shah Fatahulla took Akbar to the sleeping quarters.

In the morning, the Rajput nobles prayed to their deities and waited. Akbar had his beard shaved and saying that he would invade Firang he permitted the nobles to leave their beards intact. Akbar then took off his turban and tore it into strips. Each Hindu chieftain was given a strip from the turban and had Gangajal (water from the holy Ganges) placed on his palm. Prince Dalpat also received a strip of Akbar's turban.

The animals were then released and Akbar rested for five days. On the sixth day, Akbar had his beard shaved and all the nobles also had their beards shaved. The Emperor then proceeded towards Fatehpur Sikri. En route, the party camped near Ramgarh after crossing the Chahnal river. Raja Bhagwantdas came to meet Akbar at the encampment. Akbar rebuked Bhagwantdas and Man Singh for abandoning the siege of Kumbhalmer. Rumors flew in the camp that they had sustained heavy losses and were short of supplies. In truth ( per the Akbarnama) Shahbaz Khan sent them back as he suspected that the two would be less than industrious in their efforts against the Rana (Rana Pratap). At the camp, Prince Dalpat noticed a Rajput holding a dagger and moving towards Kunwar Man Singh. Dalpat raised an alarm, and the person was intercepted by Rav Durga.

The fragmentary manuscript ends at this point, the contents of the missing portion are unknown.

== Corroboration of events in the Dalpat Vilas ==
The genealogy of the Rathores and the Sur dynasty as described in the Dalpat Vilas, are in keeping with other historical sources. The story of Sher Shah Suri repaying a debt of gratitude is uncorroborated. The manuscript ascribes Hemu's killing to Akbar's nobles, this is consistent with the version in the writings of Abul Fazl, Badaoni and others. Akbar's visit to Nagaur is also mentioned in the Akbarnama while the siege of Siwana is also spoken of by Abul Fazl.

Akbar's unusual behavior at the Qamargah hunt of 1579 is mentioned in the Akbarnama and by Badaoni. The rather detailed description of the happenings ( in the Dalpat Vilas ) suggest that the author was actually present at the scene.

== Author's bias in the Dalpat Vilas ==
The Dalpat Vilas blames Karam Chand Bachhawat Mehta for Maharaja Rai Singh's failure to capture Siwana, the death of Ram Singh and other problems of the state. In regard to siege of Siwana, Rai Singh was a good commander in open field warfare but less experienced in conducting a siege. Informed of this, Akbar sent Shahbaz Khan to conduct the siege. Karam Chand Bachhawat Mehta was a capable minister and found employment with the Emperor after leaving Bikaner.

== Source material ==
- Sharma, Dasharatha (1970), Lectures on Rajput History and Culture, Motilal Banarsidass, Delhi.
- Sharma, Girija Shankar (2003) Dalpat Vilas: Itihas ki drishti se samikshan in Hamare Purodha-19 Dr. Dasharatha Sharma (in Hindi) Rajasthan Sahitya Akademi, Udaipur. ISBN 81-88445-00-2.
