= Hortoneda =

- Locality
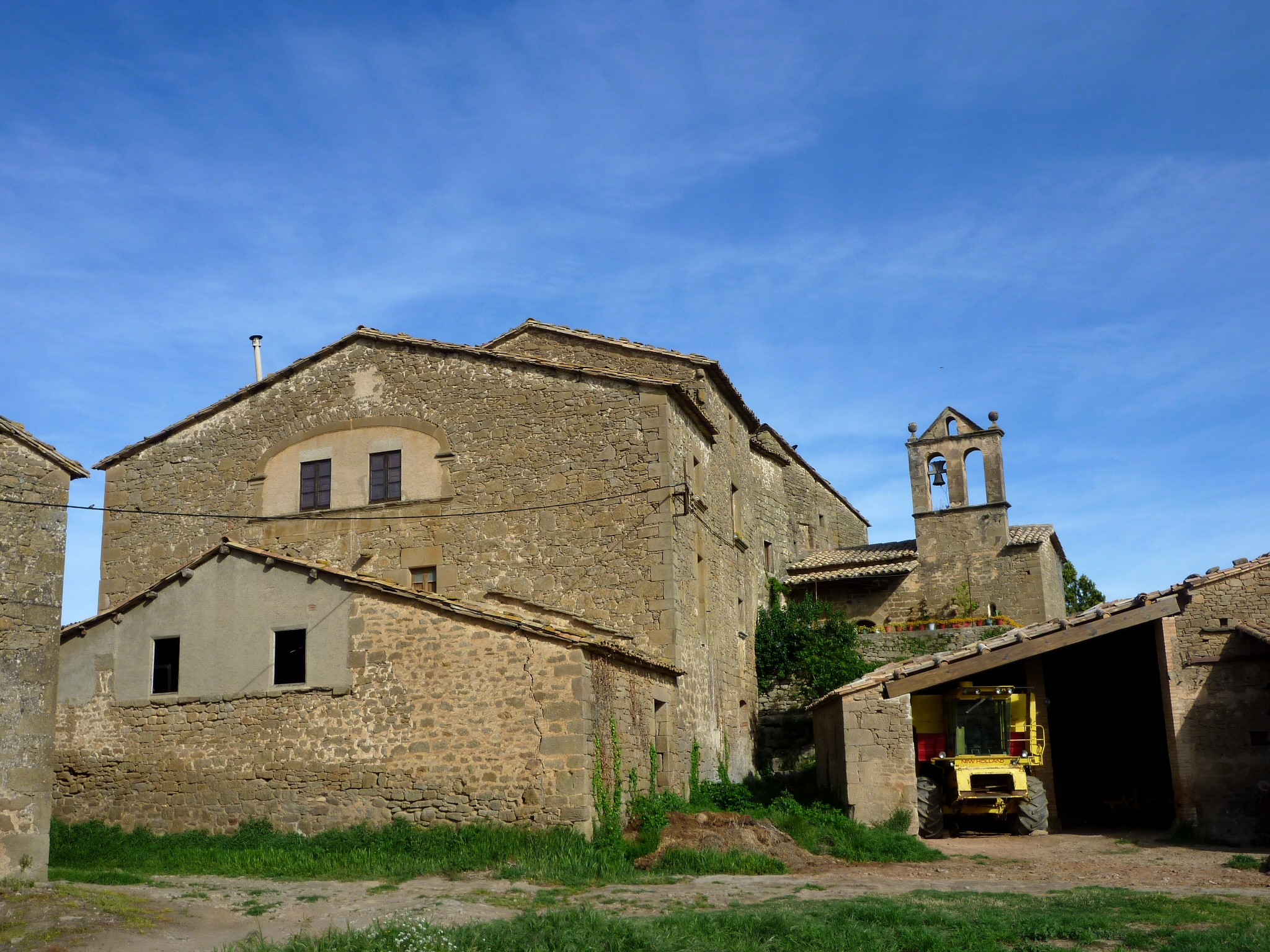

- Location within Province of Lleida Location within Catalonia Location within Spain
- Coordinates: 41°57′41″N 1°34′28″E
- Country: Spain
- Community: Catalonia
- Province: Lleida
- Municipality: Clariana de Cardener
- Elevation: 716 m (2,349 ft)

Population
  - Total: 39

Hortoneda is a locality located in the municipality of Clariana de Cardener, in Province of Lleida province, Catalonia, Spain. As of 2020, it has a population of 39.

== Geography ==
Hortoneda is located 114km east-northeast of Lleida.
