= Clariana de Cardener =

- Municipality
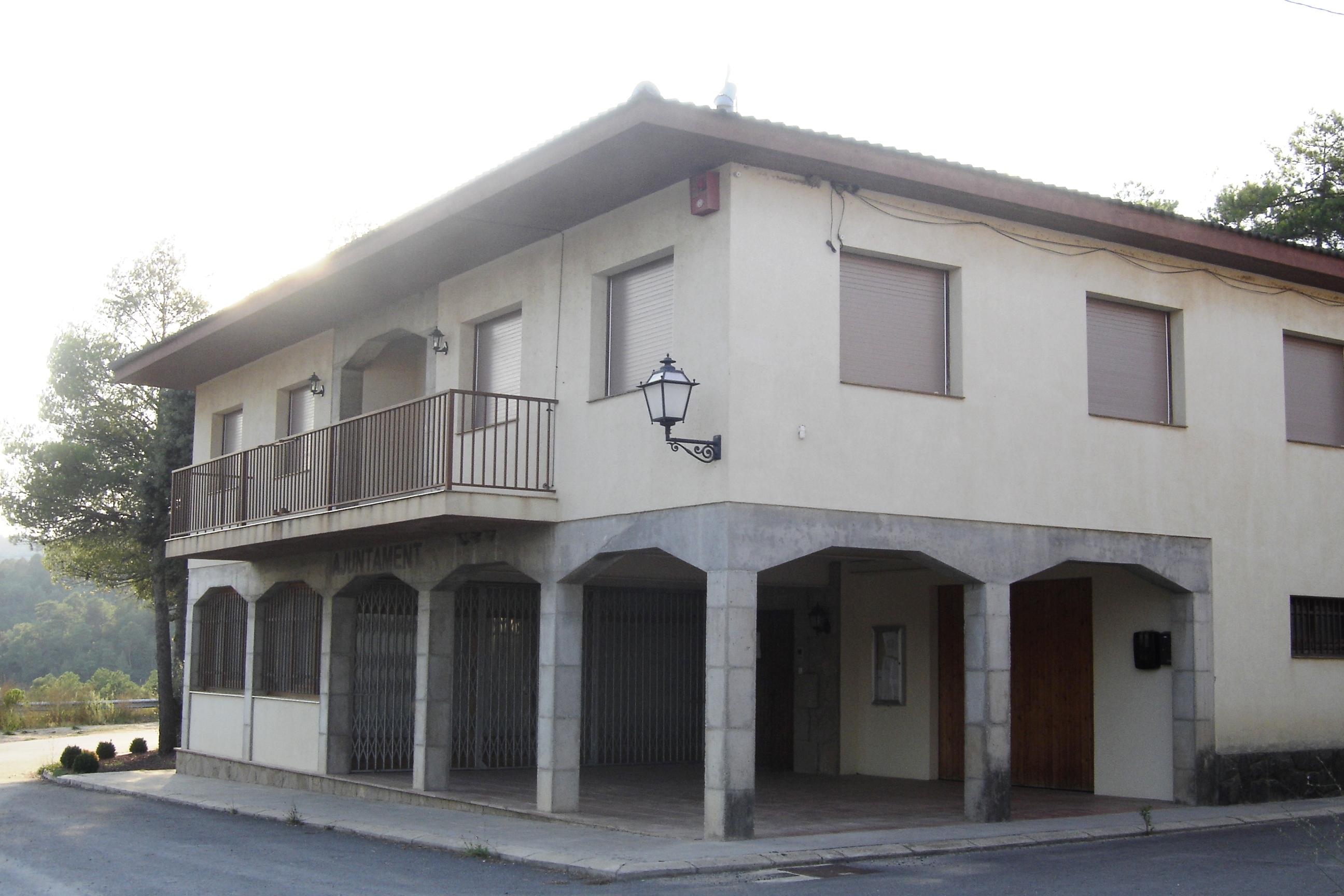
- Town hall

- Flag Coat of arms

- Location in Catalonia
- Coordinates: 41°56′05″N 1°37′51″E
- Country: Spain
- Community: Catalonia
- Province: Lleida
- Comarca: Solsonès

Government
  - Mayor: Francisco Rovira Massoni (2015)

Area
  - Total: 40.8 km^{2} (15.8 sq mi)
- Elevation: 500 m (1,600 ft)

Population (2025-01-01)
  - Total: 160
  - Density: 3.9/km^{2} (10/sq mi)
- Postal code: 25290
- Website: clarianacardener.cat

Clariana de Cardener (Catalan pronunciation: [kləɾiˈanə ðə kəɾðəˈne]) is a municipality in the comarca of the Solsonès in Catalonia, Spain. It is situated on the Cardener river below the reservoir of Sant Ponç. The village is served by the C-1410 road between Cardona and Solsona. It has a population of 160 (register office, 2025).

== Subdivisions ==
The municipality of Clariana de Cardener is formed of four villages. Populations are given as of 2005:

- Clariana de Cardener (42)
- Hortoneda (26)
- Sant Just i Joval (50)
- Sant Ponç (31)
