= Vila e Roussas =

- Civil parish
- Location in Portugal
- Coordinates: 42.114°N 8.259°W
- Country: Portugal
- Region: Norte
- Intermunic. comm.: Alto Minho
- District: Viana do Castelo
- Municipality: Melgaço

Area
  - Total: 11.51 km^{2} (4.44 sq mi)

Population (2011)
  - Total: 2,667
  - Density: 230/km^{2} (600/sq mi)
- Time zone: UTC+00:00 (WET)
  - Summer (DST): UTC+01:00 (WEST)

Vila e Roussas is a civil parish in the municipality of Melgaço, Portugal. It contains the town centre of Melgaço. It was formed in 2013 by the merger of the former parishes Vila and Roussas. The population in 2011 was 2,667, in an area of 11.51 km^{2}.
