= Roussas (Melgaço) =

- Civil parish
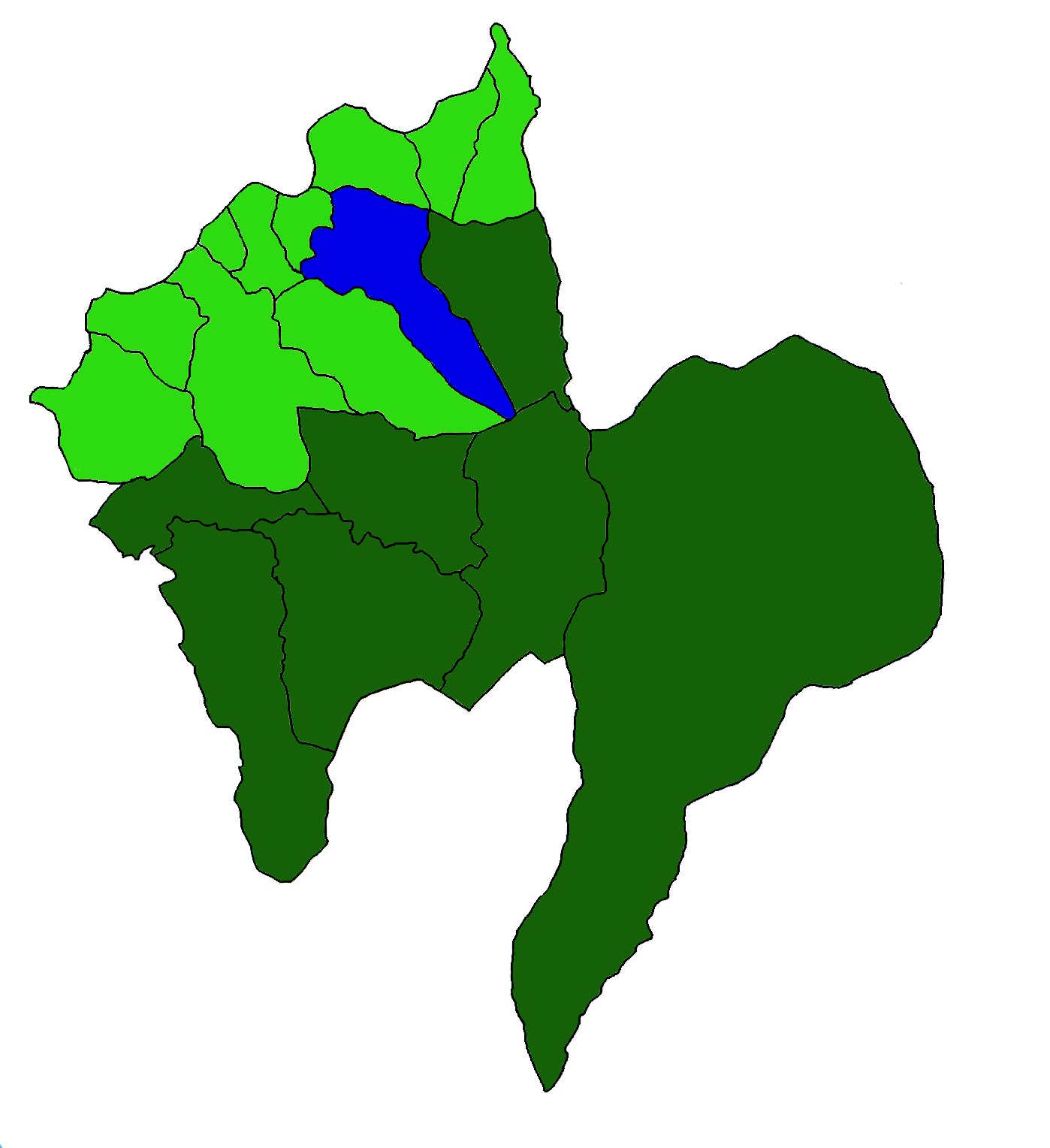
- Coordinates: 42°06′20″N 8°14′29″W
- Country: Portugal
- Region: Norte
- Intermunic. comm.: Alto Minho
- District: Viana do Castelo
- Municipality: Melgaço
- Disbanded: 2013

Area
  - Total: 4.46 km^{2} (1.72 sq mi)

Population
  - Total: 1,139
  - Density: 260/km^{2} (660/sq mi)
- Time zone: UTC+00:00 (WET)
  - Summer (DST): UTC+01:00 (WEST)

Roussas is a former civil parish in the municipality of Melgaço in the Viana do Castelo District, Portugal. In 2013, the parish merged into the new parish Vila e Roussas. It has a population of 1139 inhabitants and a total area of 4.46 km^{2}.

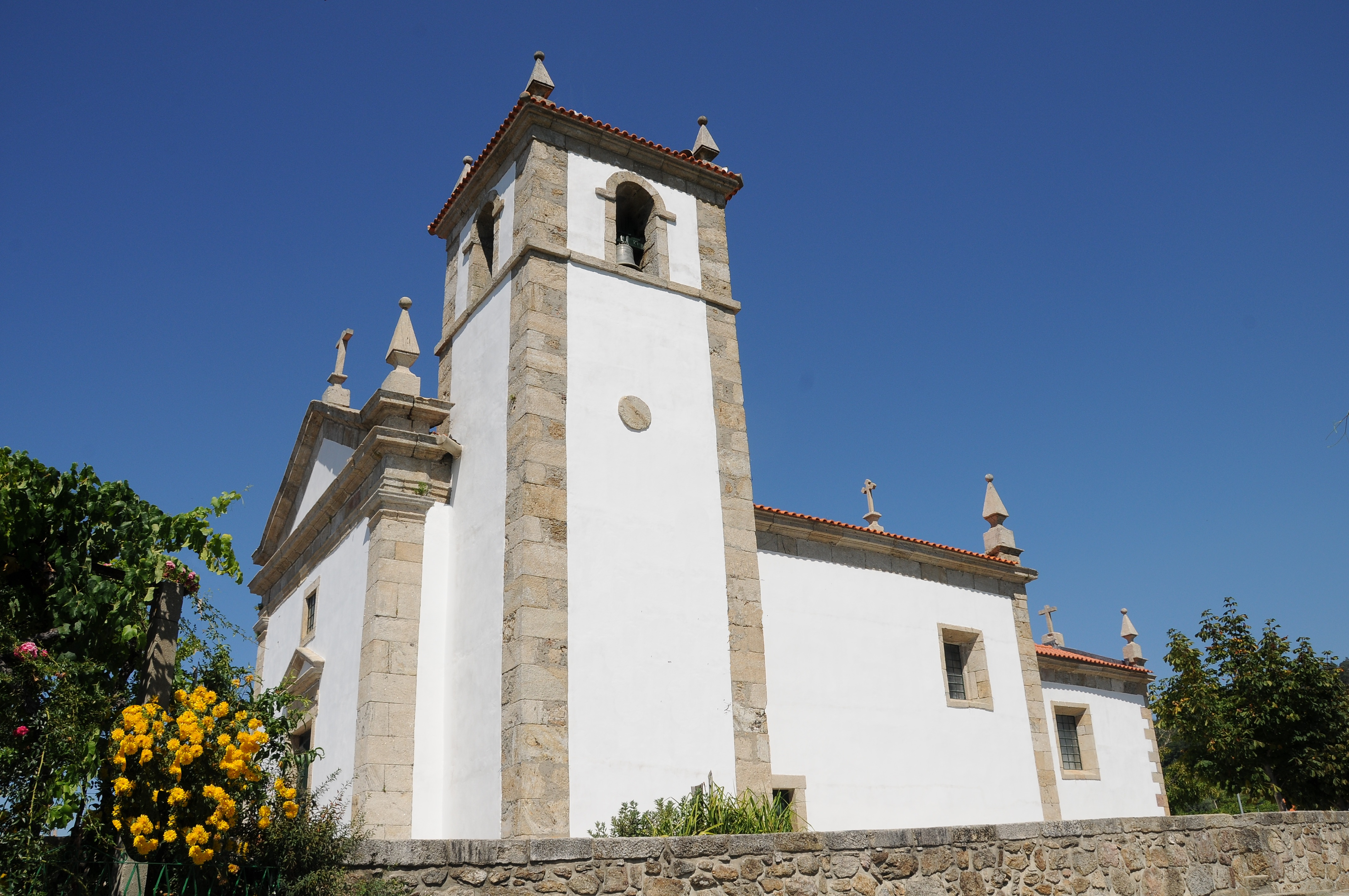
Roussas Church
