= Sant Just i Joval =

- Locality
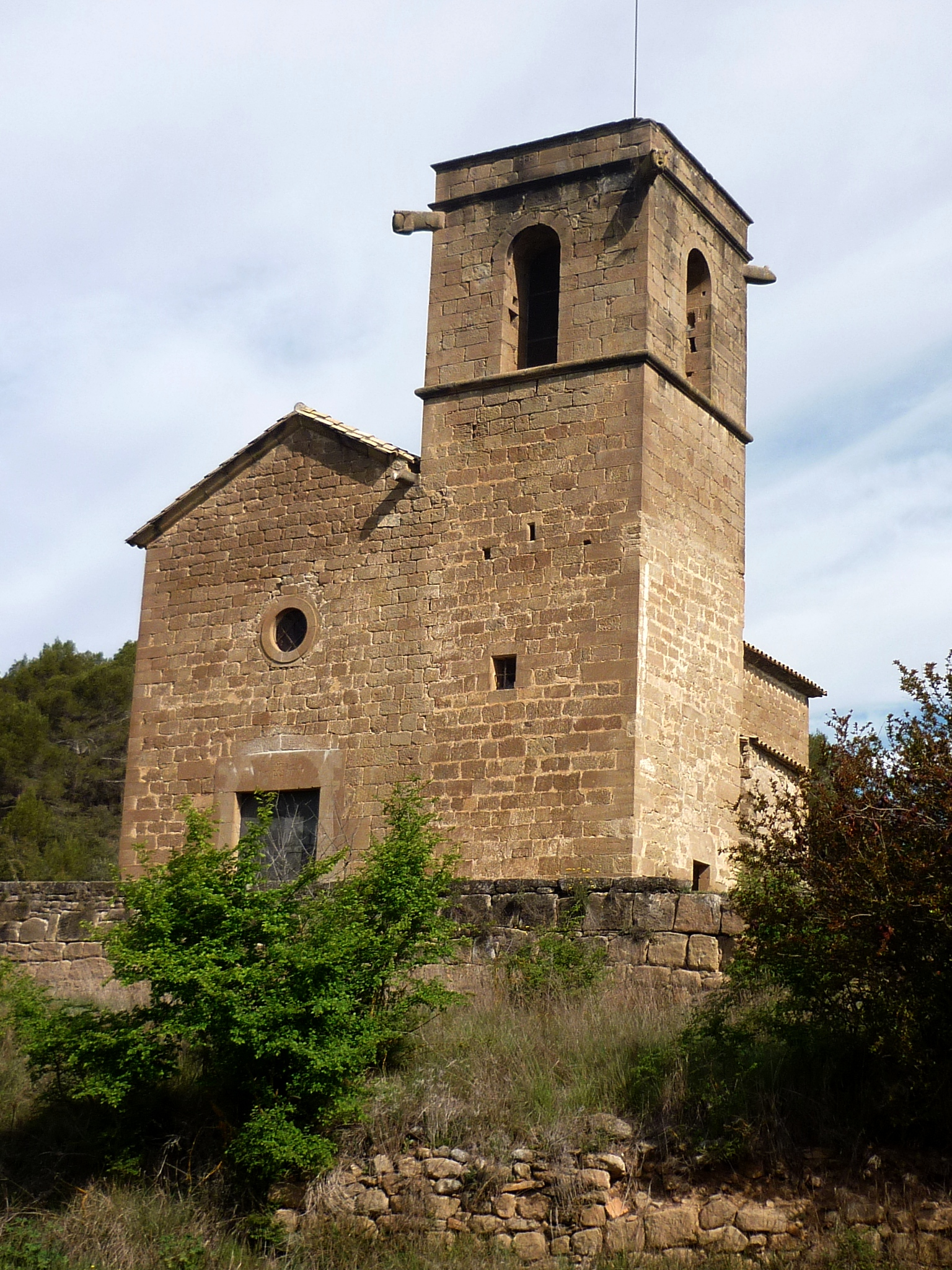

- Location within Province of Lleida Location within Catalonia Location within Spain
- Coordinates: 41°58′26″N 1°33′39″E
- Country: Spain
- Community: Catalonia
- Province: Lleida
- Municipality: Clariana de Cardener
- Elevation: 725 m (2,379 ft)

Population
  - Total: 65

Sant Just i Joval is a locality located in the municipality of Clariana de Cardener, in Province of Lleida province, Catalonia, Spain. As of 2020, it has a population of 65.

== Geography ==
Sant Just i Joval is located 112km east-northeast of Lleida.
