= Bilas =

Bilas may refer to:

== People ==
Last name

- Jay Bilas (born 1963), American college basketball analyst and former professional basketball player and coach
- Rudolf Bilas (born 1992), Slovak football midfielder
- Frances Spence (born Frances V. Bilas; 1922–2012), American computer programmer

Middle name

- Har Bilas Sarda (1867–1955), Indian academic, judge and politician
- Ram Bilas Sharma (1912–2000), Indian literary critic, linguist, poet and thinker
- Ram Bilas Sharma (politician) (born 1948), Indian politician

== Other uses ==
- Jabal al-Bilas, a high desert area in Syria
- Bhranti Bilas, a 1963 Indian Bengali-language comedy film
- Chandi Charitar Ukti Bilas, a heroic poetic composition traditionally attributed to Guru Gobind Singh
- Samla bilas, a species of sea slug

== See also ==
- Vilas (disambiguation)
