= Margalida Caimari Vila =

Margalida Caimari i Vila
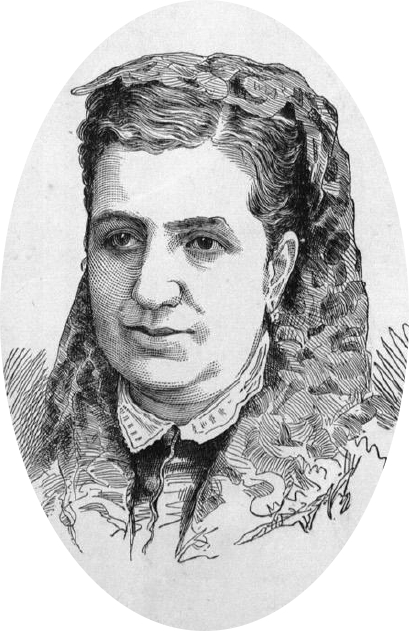
- Margalida Caimari in 1879
- Born: 1839; Cuba
- Died: 1921 (aged 81–82); Palma, Islas Baleares; Spain
- Occupation: writer

Margalida Caimari i Vila (1839, Cuba – 1921, Palma de Mallorca) was a poet of the Renaixença and social benefactor linked to Mallorca, Catalonia and Cuba.

== Biography ==
Margalida Caimari i Vila was born in Cuba to a well-to-do Minorcan family, who had immigrated to the Caribbean for business reasons. She married Miquel Bauló i Oliver, a member of the liberal commercial bourgeoisie, which helped her to have more education and freedom than most women of her background. Supported by the Renaixença-leader Josep Lluís Pons i Gallarza, as a young woman she not only wrote poetry but recited poems in public at different times, which was very unusual for a woman around 1869. She was part of a group of young writers who moved inside the Ateneo Balear and the gathering of Pons and Gallarza.

Her most innovative poetry is the realistic one of popular inspiration and the patriotic one; in the first one, she excels at explaining the feelings of solitude and impotence of the woman who hopes the husband immigrated to Cuba. In the second, the idea of Catalan homeland is very clear and admires industrialization. She was able to carry out an important literary activity, with her own talk, and of social beneficence because she had only one daughter, unlike other writers, such as Manuela de los Herreros Sorà, with whom she established friendship, who saw her work collapsed because of maternity. She published both in magazines in Mallorca and in Catalonia.

She approached the social question from Catholicism, according to the guidelines of Leo XIII, she knew first hand the work of the textile workers by the company of her husband, "La Alfombrera", and she was very active in founding for the children of the workers the Bressols del Minyó Jesus, in imitation of those of Catalonia. At the age of 71, she inaugurated the day schools for working children. She reflected, however, her social conservatism in some poems.

She was valued as a poet by Jeroni Rosselló, Miquel dels Sants Oliver, Manuel Sanchis i Guarner, Archduke Ludwig Salvator of Austria but, pressed by the stereotype, only valued and reproduced the maternal poems. She has a street in her name in Palma, the city where she was educated.

=== Poetry ===
Here is some of her work.

_{MY WISH (1874)}

_{Mallorca, dear land,}

_{which I have been walking for so many years,}

_{if you are not my homeland, Mallorca,}

_{as if you were I love you.}

_{The sweet storm of my land}

_{unfortunately I have never heard;}

_{nor the room where I was born,}

_{nor my world of reeds have I seen.}

_{Baby, very baby, they took me}

_{inside the ship that left,}

_{lighter than a dove,}

_{far from my native air.}

_{They say my country is beautiful,}

_{that its fields have beautiful gardens,}

_{that the trees reach the sky}

_{from end to end of the year flowers.}

_{Clear and wide torrents}

_{take water from large rivers}

_{that spread across the land}

_{of the Yumurí valleys.}

_{If my country is beautiful,}

_{if its children are noble,}

_{it is also beautiful. Mallorca,}

_{new homeland that I love.}

_{The first baby echo}

_{that was born from my chest;}

_{the name of the one whose doors}

_{have opened to me from Paradise;}

_{of a father the sacred memory,}

_{of a wife the loving yes,}

_{and the sweet name of a mother}

_{that my children will give me;}

_{all in the Majorcan language}

_{I understand it, feel it and say it.}

_{Mallorca is already my mother;}

_{they are my brothers, Majorcans,}

_{and like a good sister}

_{you listen to my wish:}

_{"You wanted me among you}

_{because I sing in Majorcan;}

_{happy if among you my spirit rises}

_{to heaven".}
