= Antonia Vila =

Spanish printer and publisher

Antonia Vila (1815 – 1870), was a Spanish printer and publisher.

She published the first newspaper of Pontevedra from 1843, and has been referred to as the first newspaper editor and printer of Pontevedra.
