= Víctor da Vila =

Argentinian politician

Víctor da Vila is an activist in the Workers' Party (Argentina).

He studied at the National University of Córdoba.

He was elected as a provincial senator in Mendoza Province in June 2015.
