= Girija Shankar Sharma =

Indian historian (born 1938)

Girija Shankar Sharma (born March 1938 in Bikaner, India) is a historian and scholar of Rajasthani as well as Hindi language literature. He received a Master of Arts (M.A.) in History from Dungar College and a Doctor of Philosophy (Ph.D.) from the University of Rajasthan, Jaipur. He joined the Rajasthan State Archives (Bikaner) in 1963 and retired as deputy director of the Archives in 1996.

== Biography ==
- Marwari Vypari, ek aitehasik aur samajik vivechan (The role of Marwari traders specially their financial and social aspects related to former Bikaner state in 19th century), Publisher: Krishna Janasevi, Dauji Road, Bikaner 1988.
- Itihaas-Ro-Saach (Historical articles about Rajasthan in the Rajasthani language) Publisher: Aacharya Tulsi Rajasthani Sodh Sansthan, Gangashahar, Bikaner 2002.
- Hamarey Purodha: Dr Dasharatha Sharma (On the life and works of Dasharatha Sharma, Hindi author and historian), in Hindi (includes passages in Rajasthani language). Publisher: Rajasthan Sahitya Akadami, Udaipur 2003, ISBN 8188445002
- Sources on social and economic history of Rajasthan, 17th-20th century A.D., Publisher: Vikas Prakashan, Bikaner 2005.
- Bikaner ki chitrankan parampara (Traditional wall and door decorative arts in Bikaner), in Hindi. Publisher: Jawahar Kala Kendra evam Kalasan Prakashan, Bikaner 2005.
- Sindhyacha Dayaldas (On the life and works of a 19th-century Rajasthani poet, includes a sampling of his works), in Rajasthani language. Publisher: Sahitya Akademi, New Delhi 2006. ISBN 8126022701
- Ehasan ka ehasas: Kahani sangraha (Short stories) in Hindi, Publisher: Prakhyata Prakashan, Bikaner 2007.
- Sannatta Cheerte Shabd: (Hindi Poetry) Publisher: Prakhyata Prakashan, Bikaner 2007.
- Rajasthan mein shiksha ka itihaas (History of education in Rajasthan) Publisher: Kalashan Prakashan, Bikaner 2009.
- Marwari Drishti-Pratidrishti (A critical analysis of the Marwari community in the 19th century). Publisher: Vikas Prakashan, Nagri Bhandar, Bikaner 2012.

=== Co-Edited works ===
- Deshdarpana: Bikaner Rajya ka ithihas/ Sindhyacha Dayaldas, (Monograph in Rajasthani on the Rajasthani poet) Principal Editor: J. K. Jain, Editors: Girija Shankar Sharma, Sanatkumar Swami, Satyanarayan Swami, Publisher: Rajasthan Rajya Abhilekhgara 1989.
- Kurmavilasa: Jaipur Rajya ke Kachvaha Shaskon ka itihas/Chanda kavi virachit (Extended narrative poem on rulers of the Princely State of Jaipur, in Rajasthani language). Publisher: Rajasthan Rajya Abhilekhgar 1991.
