= Villas Boas =

Villas Boas is a surname. Notable people with the surname include:

- André Villas-Boas (born 1977), Portuguese football manager
- Antônio Vilas Boas, alleged UFO abductee (1934–1991)
- Villas-Bôas brothers, Orlando (1914–2002), Cláudio (1916–1998) and Leonardo Villas-Bôas (1918–1961), Brazilian explorers and activists regarding indigenous peoples
- Waldir Villas Boas (1925–2004), Brazilian footballer
