= Joan Eloi Vila =

Spanish musician (1959–2021)

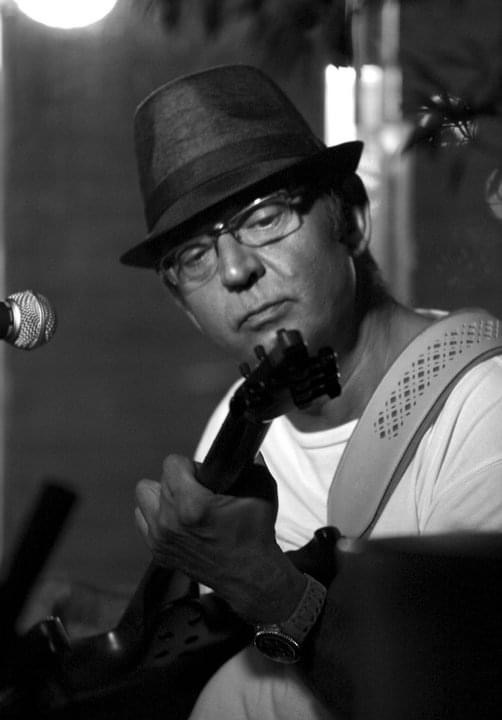

Joan Eloi Vila de Paz (12 April 1959 ― 17 January 2021), was a Spanish guitarist.

Joan Eloi Vila studied at the Conservatori Superior de Musica del Liceu, at the Center d'Estudis Musicals, at the Aula de Música Moderna y Jazz, and at 10 Master-Classes with Joe Pass in France. He was a member of the children's group "Els Xipis" and collaborated with the Barcelona orchestra "La Salseta del Poble Sec" and has had a long career accompanying established artists on their tours: Jimmy Page, Joan Baptista Humet (from 1980 to 1984), Joaquín Sabina and Joan Isaac.

Vila released a solo album in 2000: "40 anys i un dia" (Salseta Records). In 2012 he decided to form the duo "BCN swing" with vocalist Philip Stanton.

== Television career ==
On television he participated in programs such as Eugeni, 5 millor que 2, Ángel Casas Show, Bonic vespre and La noche Abierto. But he really stood out in the programs where he participated with Andreu Buenafuente, where he made his leap to fame in La cosa nostra, Una altra cosa, Sense títol, Sense títol 2, S/N, and Buenafuente y BFN.

He began working on television with comedian Andreu Buenafuente as a member of the music band of the program Sense Títol. A few years later, he occasionally has brief appearances with Andreu, on the show La Cosa Nostra (1999). Later, Buenafuente went to Antena 3 channel with a self-titled program in 2005 and accompanied him, as well as in his passage to La Sexta.

He participated playing together with the members of the BFN band in special broadcasts of La Sexta such as Cómo superar el fin de año con Berto Romero y Ana Morgade (December 31, 2009), 2011 con Berto Romero y Ana Morgade (2010). In 2012 he began his participation in the Antena 3 program Buenas noches y Buenafuente.

He died on 17 January 2021 at the age of 61.
