= Sant Ponç =

- Locality
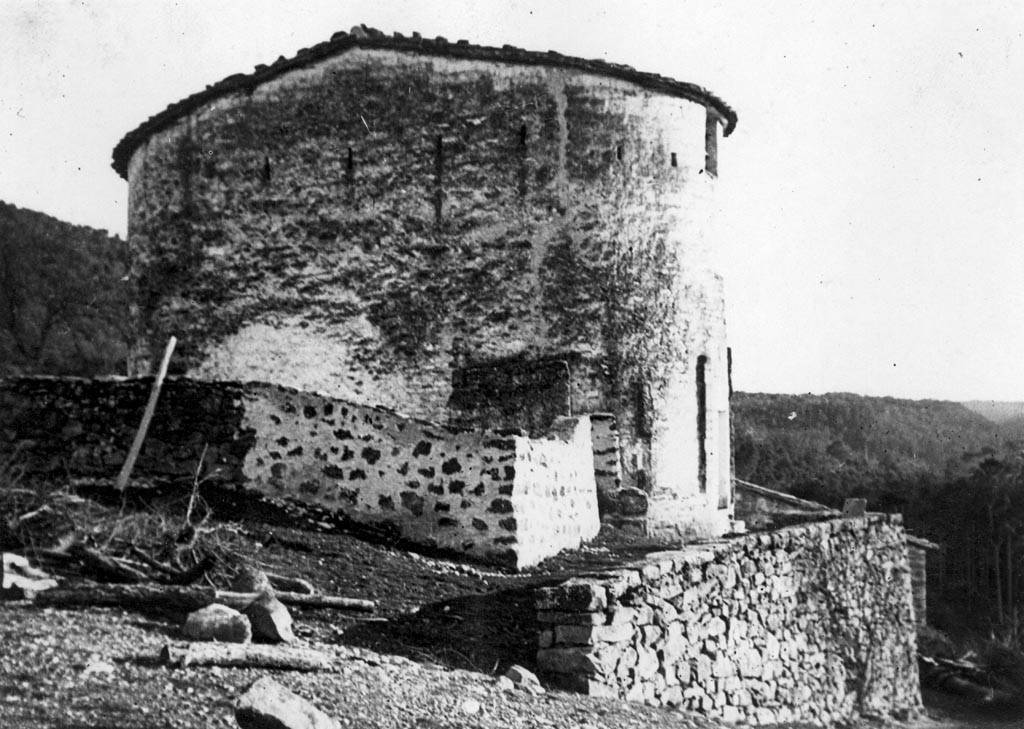

- Location within Province of Lleida Location within Catalonia Location within Spain
- Coordinates: 41°57′49″N 1°36′7″E
- Country: Spain
- Community: Catalonia
- Province: Lleida
- Municipality: Clariana de Cardener
- Elevation: 533 m (1,749 ft)

Population
  - Total: 13

Sant Ponç is a locality located in the municipality of Clariana de Cardener, in Province of Lleida province, Catalonia, Spain. As of 2020, it has a population of 13.

== Geography ==
Sant Ponç is located 118km east-northeast of Lleida.
