= Vila (Melgaço) =

- Civil parish
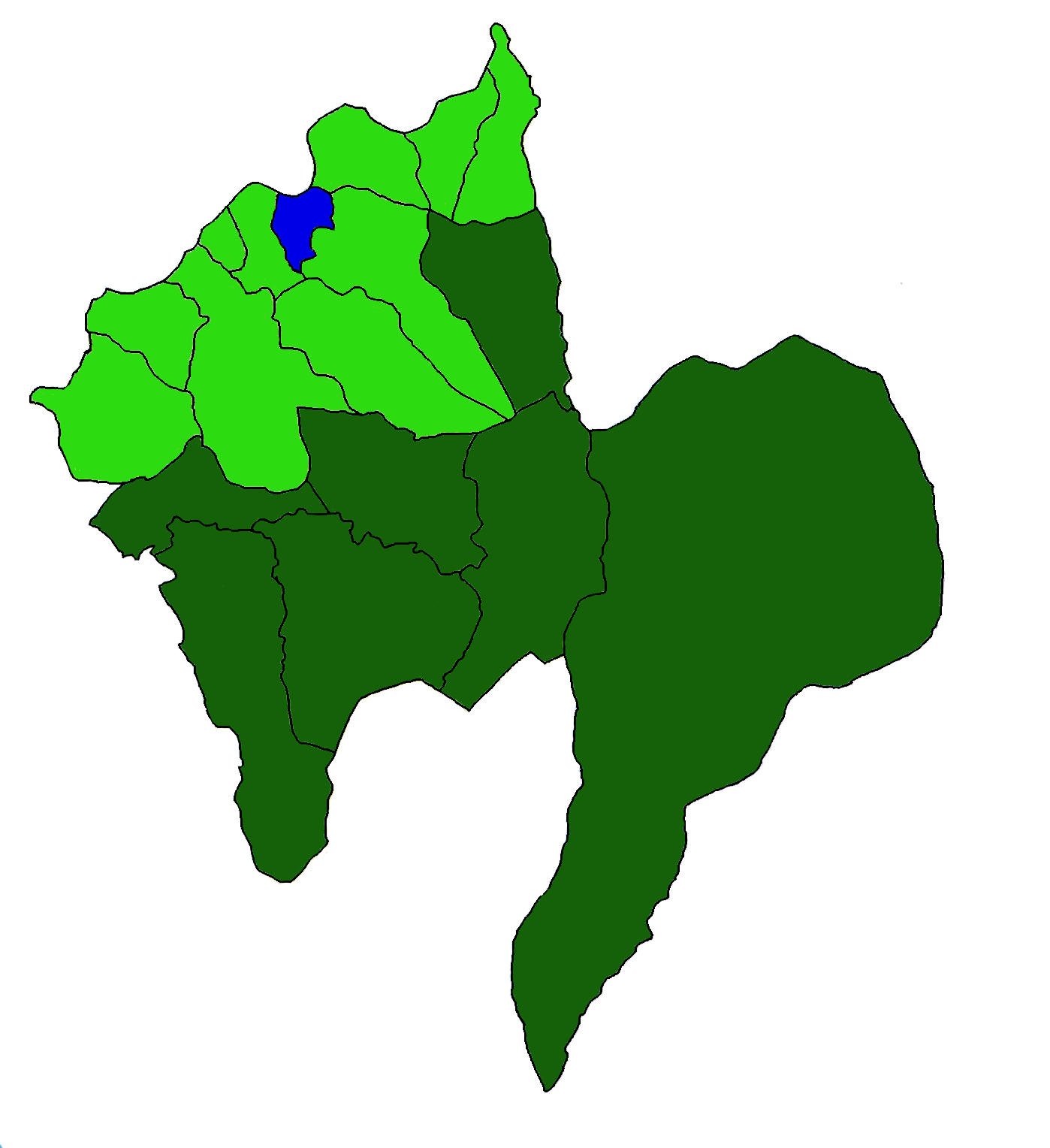
- Coordinates: 42°06′45″N 8°15′40″W
- Country: Portugal
- Region: Norte
- Intermunic. comm.: Alto Minho
- District: Viana do Castelo
- Municipality: Melgaço
- Disbanded: 2013

Area
  - Total: 1.76 km^{2} (0.68 sq mi)

Population
  - Total: 1,274
  - Density: 724/km^{2} (1,870/sq mi)
- Time zone: UTC+00:00 (WET)
  - Summer (DST): UTC+01:00 (WEST)

Vila is a former civil parish in the municipality of Melgaço in the Viana do Castelo District, Portugal. In 2013, the parish merged into the new parish Vila e Roussas. It has a population of 1274 inhabitants and a total area of 1.76 km^{2}.

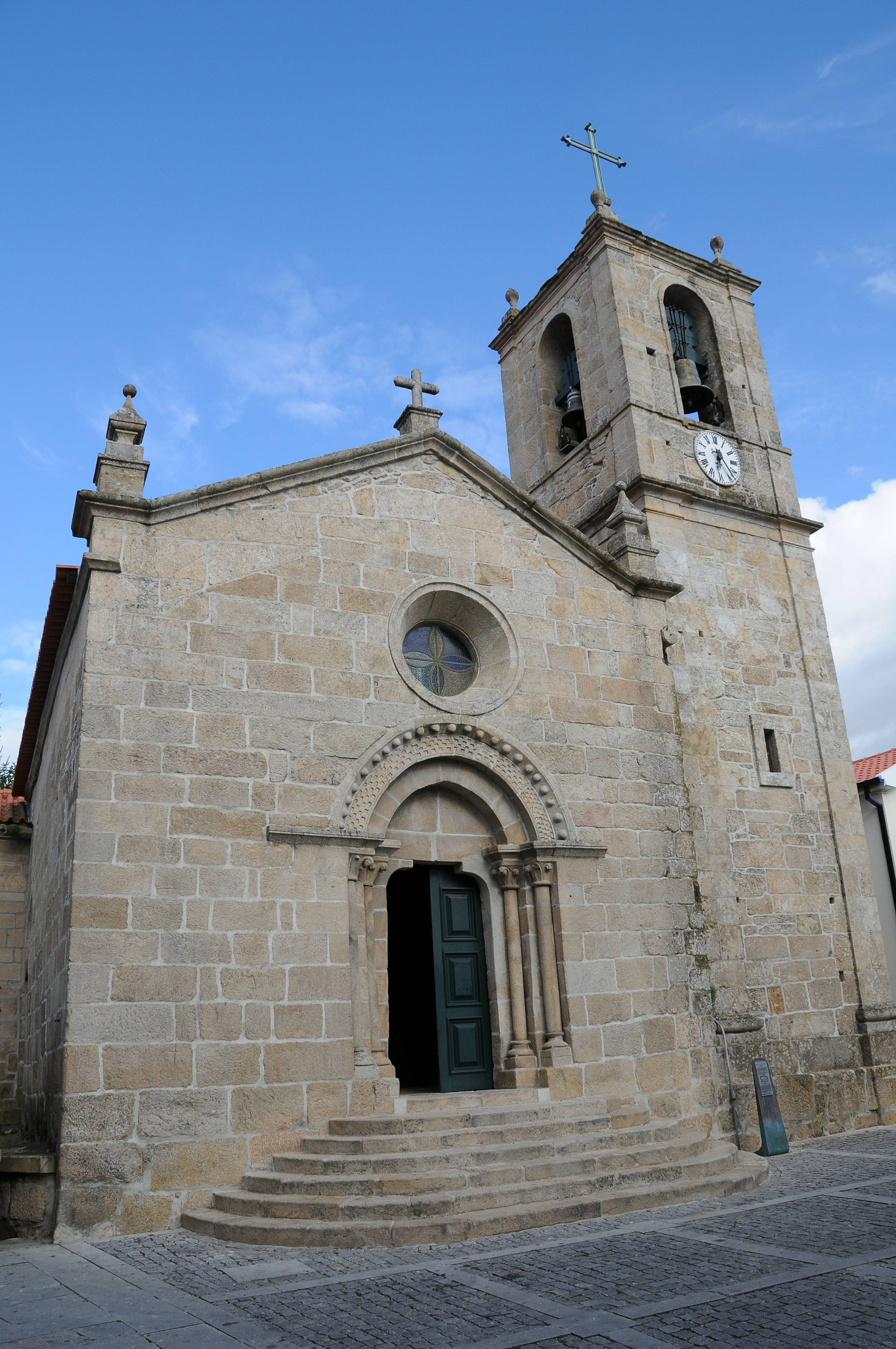
Matriz Church
