= Manuela de los Herreros Sorà =

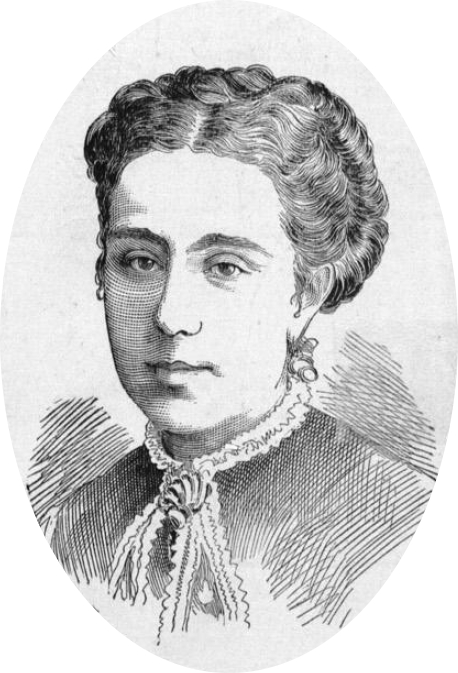
- Manuela de los Herreros i Sorà in 1879
- Born: 10 June 1845 Palma, Balearic Islands; Spain
- Died: 29 April 1911 (aged 65) Palma, Balearic Islands; Spain
- Occupation: Writer
- Language: Catalan
- Education: none
- Notable awards: Illustrious daughter of Palma (1915)
- Spouse: Enric Bonet i Ferrer

Manuela de los Herreros Sorà (10 June 1845 – 29 April 1911) was a Spanish writer and administrator.

Since an early age, she was interested in culture, especially language learning. She was in contact, thanks to her father's social position, with the Archduke Ludwig Salvator of Austria.

== Early life ==
She was born in Palma on 10 June 1845 in a high-level family. This opened doors to an education that very few women of the time could access. Her father, Manuel de las Herreros, was director of the Instituto Balear (an institution that had a major importance in the pedagogical renewal of the Balearic Islands) and one of her uncles was a professor.

She showed great interest in reading that made her stand out among the students of the schools of Bernat Homar and Alexandre Perelló. In the same way she later emphasized her knowledge of English, French, Italian and German, apart from Catalan (her mother tongue).

Before marrying, at a time when she was active as a teacher and writer, it was customary to see her at the Ateneo Balear (which had just opened for women). Following her marriage to lawyer Enric Bonet i Ferrer in 1872, they had fourteen children and her dedication to this area diminished.

== Career ==
During her years of more involvement with the literary world, she wrote in prose and verse works of customs. She was part of the editorial offices of Mallorcan magazines such as La Dulzaina, Balar Magazine and the calendar El Saracossano and published in magazines of the Principality as Lo Gay Saber and Calendari Català. She developed good relations with Catalan writers of the Renaixença that were accompanied by her willingness not to be part of the contests or the Floral Games and not to gather all of her literary output in one volume.

== Later life ==
Manuela was widowed in 1899 and four years later, in 1903, her father died. He was the director of the Balearic Institute and president of the Economic Society of Friends of the Country, and a literary collaborator and administrator of the Archduke Ludwig Salvator of Austria. She occupied the post of administrator of the Archduke. He died on 29 April 1911 in Palma, a city that would be called illustrious daughter in December 1915. She has a dedicated street in the neighborhood of Son Pastilla.
