= Karam Chand Bachhawat =

Diwan Bikaner

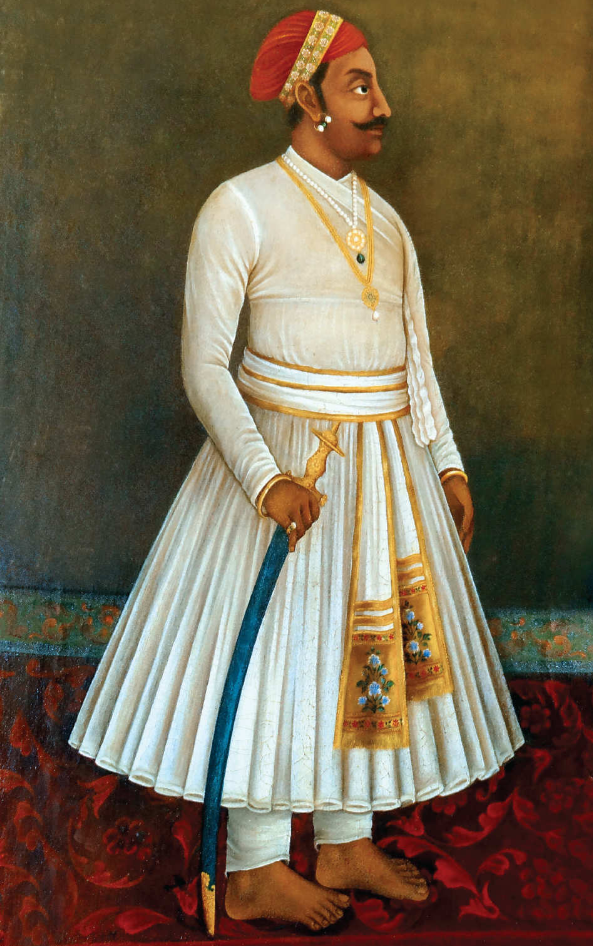
- Born: 1542 AD
- Died: 1607 (aged 64–65)
- Occupation: Dewan (Prime Minister) of Bikaner (1571-91). Gajjadhikari (Head of state council) of Emperor Akbar at Lahore court (1591-1605).
- Title: Dewan
- Spouse(s): Ajaib Devi, Jeeva Devi and Kapur Devi
- Children: Bhag Chand and Lakshmi Chand
- Father: Sangram Singh

Karamchand Bachhawat (1542–1607; Karmacand Bacchāvat) was the Dewan, Prime Minister of Bikaner State in the former Rajputana (now Rajasthan) from 1571 to 1591. Karamchand, a descendant of Bachhraj, was a valiant warrior, a good administrator and a strategist in Bikaner and had a good relationship with Akbar. In 1591, fearing for his life, he resigned. At Akbar's invitation, Karamchand later joined the emperor as an adviser to the Lahore court.

== Ancestors ==
Karamchand Bachhawat belonged to Bachhawat gotra (sect) of Oswal community. The Bachhawats belong to the feudal aristocratic order of former states of Rajputana (Rajasthan), who faced many ups and downs in life. They were brave, and many sacrificed their lives fighting for the state against Muslim invaders. They were visionary administrators par excellence but at times suspected to be anti-state but pro-Mughal and pro-British regime. The members of this clan were associated with the administration of the state for generations. Among them many were independent rulers in Delwara state (former small kingdom near Udaipur), Raja Sagar, Rana Shri Karan, Raja Bohitya Deora Chauhan. There were as many as six Prime Ministers of Jodhpur and Bikaner states from amongst the direct ancestors, Bachhraj, Karam Singh, Var Singh, Nagraj, Sangram Singh, and Karamchand Bachhawat. Later, in Mewar state, five of his descendants, Agarchand, Devichand, Sher Singh, Gokalchand and Pannalal Bachhawat Mehta, served as Prime Ministers, nine members were appointed as Kiledars (Governors of Forts; किलेदार) and more than 25 members of this clan served as Hakims (Administrators; हाकिम) in various districts of Mewar.

The Bachhawats, trace their origin from the Chauhan dynasty of Samrat Prithviraj Chauhan. The ancestors were Deora (देवड़ा) Chauhans, who ruled Delwara (city of gods; देवकुलपाटननगरी) state, in 13th-14th century. The ruler of Delwara, Raja Sagar, a Deora Chauhan and a descendant of Rao Kirtipal of Jalore, was the progenitor of Bachhawats. Later, in 14th century, this clan embraced Jainism. Thus, the Bachhawat gotra in Oswal community was born. Since, for generations many of them were in the service of rulers (Maharajas & Maharanas), the Bachhawats also followed Vaishnavism alongside Jainism.

During mid15th century, Bachhraj submitted his services to the Chief of Mandore (Jodhpur) Rao Rinmal, where he was appointed Diwan as he was able administrator and a gallant warrior. It is said that a relative of Rana Kumbha of Mewar murdered Rao Rinmal. Diwan Bachhraj swiftly crowned the eldest son Rao Jodha to prevent any external aggression. Rao Jodha, then, for the first time, allowed Bachhraj and other Oswals to take part in commanding armies. In 1465, Rao Bika, elder son of Rao Jodha, chose Bachhraj as his main follower, along with his uncle Rawal Kandhal and others, while proceeding to establish a new territory, later named Bikaner.

Bachhraj was appointed as Dewan of the newly founded state of Bikaner. The descendants of Bachhraj came to be known as Bachhawat, which later became a distinctive clan (gotra) and an ethnic group. With the passage of time the influence of Bachhawats grew by leaps and bounds. Each descendant of this clan was appointed as Dewan of Bikaner. Although ancestors of Bachhawats were Kshatriyas (Deora Chauhans), they now belonged to Vaishya (Bania) caste; hence they understood military strategy better than any Kshatriya adviser as royal blood runs in them. They used their pen and sword with equal skill and impact.

== Loyal to state, brilliant administrator & suave strategist ==
Karamchand was born in 1542 AD (Vikram Samvat 1599, Paush vid 11; Indian lunar calendar). In 1571, Rao Kalyanmal, on demise of Dewan Sangram Singh, a descendant of Bachhraj, appointed his son Karamchand as Dewan of Bikaner. He was popular in Bikaner and had built a good rapport with Emperor Akbar Jalal-u-din (1556-1605). The royal family of Bikaner had marital relations with the Mughals. Daughter of Kalyanmal was married to Emperor Akbar in 1570 and later his son Rai Singh's daughter was married to prince Salim (later Emperor Jahangir). Thus, the ruling family of Bikaner was one among the chosen families from Rajputana, being part of marriage alliance arranged by Karamchand. Neither event is alluded to in the ‘Kiyant’ but the facts are recorded by Ferishta (pages 234 and 260, Brigg's Translation). Thus, Kalyan's son Rai Singh, who succeeded him in 1573, was one of Akbar's most distinguished generals. In 1571, while travelling with Prince Rai Singh from Bikaner to the court of Emperor Akbar at Lahore, the much-indebted Dewan Karamchand, before his departure asked Rao Kalyanmal, "My Lord, order me as you please". Rao Kalyanmal said that he has everything but wants to fulfil the wishes of his ancestors. He said,

“I want to perform Kamal Puja (prayers for departed souls of ancestors) sitting in the ‘gavaksh’ (balcony) of Jodhpur palace to fulfil the wishes of late Rao Bika”.

Karamchand along with Rajkumar Rai Singh paid their obeisance to Emperor Akbar. Since Karamchand enjoyed a good equation with Akbar, he asked him for a favour, for Rao Kalyanmal to perform puja at the Jodhpur palace. Since Jodhpur was under the rule of Akbar, his wishes were granted instantly. Thus, Rao Kalyanmal could fulfil the wishes of his ancestors and asked Karamchand what he would like in return. Karamchand politely said,

“I have everything given by you. However, you may like to grant that during the four months of chaturmaas (monsoon) – teli (oilman), kumhar (potter), kandoi (confectioner), etc to stop violence related work. Do not collect tax on ‘maal’ (goods), goats, sheep, etc”.

Rao Kalyanmal accepted his wishes and granted four villages on stamped paper to Karamchand. Since Karamchand was on good terms with Emperor Akbar, the rulers of Bikaner were among the most loyal adherents of the empire and held high ranks as Mansabdars of special order in the imperial court, like Raja Man Singh I of Amber (Jaipur). They served as military commanders in various Mughal campaigns all over the Indian sub-continent. Karamchand fought alongside Raja Rai Singh to defeat the Sultan of Gujarat. Emperor Akbar was pleased with the strategist in Dewan Karamchand and asked him what he wished for. He replied,

“I do not want anything for myself but a grant of 52 parganas for my king”.

Karamchand had three wives – Ajaib Devi, Jeeva Devi and Kapur Devi (Ajaibde, Jibade and Kapurde). He along with his family often travelled to Jain pilgrim centres – Shatrunjay, Girnar, Mt Abu, etc. and gave away plenty of alms in charity. He was an able disciple of Acharya Jinachandra Suri.

== Kind hearted and saviour of Jainism in medieval period ==
In 1573, Rao Kalyanmal was succeeded by Rao Rai Singh. With the help of strategist Karamchand, Rao Rai Singh expanded his kingdom and brought in a lot of prosperity for Bikaner state. The kingdom of Rao Rai Singh extended up to Harappa in Sindh (Sindhu Desh) by defeating the forces of Balochis. At the behest of Karamchand, the captured Baluchi prisoners of war were properly clothed, fed and returned to their homes, with dignity.

The valiant and brave king Rao Rai Singh of Bikaner was granted the title of Raja by Emperor Akbar. Karamchand, who had deep concern for the environment and Jain traditions, had orders issued for stopping of fishing activities in Sutlej, Dek and Raavi rivers. He stopped felling of trees in the desert region. Raja Rai Singh also passed orders banning killing of animals during Paryushan (holy festival of Jains during monsoon).

The rare 1050 Jina images (Jain paintings) and sculptures (gold & brass) looted by Sultan Tursam Khan in 1576, from the shrines of Sirohi were kept with Emperor Akbar at Fatehpur Sikri. It was intended to melt the statues and extract the gold, but Akbar denied the permission and ordered them to be kept safely. It was at the behest of Karamchand that Raja Rai Singh approached the Emperor and the statues were respectfully released in 1582.

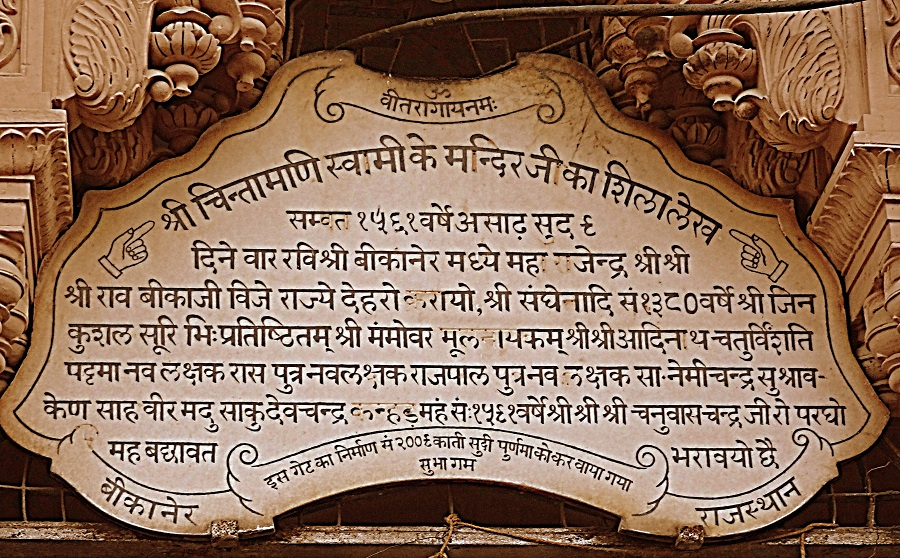
Chintamani Mandir Bikaner - inscription - that Bachhawats has renovated it.

When the statues arrived at Bikaner, Karamchand along with the Jain Acharyas and disciples organised a grand function to welcome these statues and installed them in the basement of Chintamani Mandir. From time to time on special occasions the basement is opened, and the statues worshipped as per Jain traditions in public. Such auspicious occasions in the 20th century were in the year 1943, when Acharya Mani Sagar Suri Maharaj arrived in Bikaner, then in 1962, 1978, 2009 and now in November 2017. Perhaps, due to non-availability of regular puja and worship facilities for so many divine statues, they are stored in the basement even today.

In the Chintamani temple, the main ‘Chaturvinshti’ (24 statues) idol was badly damaged during the invasion by Kamaran, ruler of Lahore and brother of Emperor Humayun. The stone-plaque at the temple put up in 1952 (VS 2009) mentions that the renovation work was carried out by the Bachhawat descendants of Mantri Bachhraj, namely Mantri Var Singh.

In 1586, Karamchand learnt that Jain temples at Shatrunjay (Palitana) and other places in Saurashtra were being destroyed by Navarang Khan. Fearing destruction of more Jain temples in the area, he immediately petitioned Akbar for the protection of Jain temples. Akbar at once issued a farmaan (stamped order) to Azam Khan of Gujarat to put Shatrunjay and other Jain temples in Saurashtra under the control of Karamchand for their protection. Later, a Jain temple was constructed by Karamchand at Palitana and at his maternal home (nanihal) in Merata city in memory of his mother.

== Bachhawats granted title of Mehta & honour to wear gold in legs ==
In 1586, Prince Salim (later Emperor Jahangir), son of Akbar and son-in-law of Raja Rai Singh was blessed with a daughter under inauspicious planetary conditions. The advice of Shaikh Abul Fazal and other learned people was sought. In the end, Karamchand and astrologers were consulted and special puja as per Jain philosophy was performed by Pontiff Bhanu Chandra to successfully ward off evil effects. Karamchand presented Prince Salim with a precious pearl necklace worth 1300 gold mohars (coins). Emperor Akbar was mighty pleased with Karamchand and he granted the honour to the ladies of Bachhawat family to wear gold in the foot. Till then this honour was reserved for only Sarang family of Oswal clan. The title of Mehta (a person engaged in important assignment; महत्त्वपूर्ण कार्यकर्ता) was also granted to him. All his direct descendants settled in Mewar use the title of Mehta. Karamchand Bachhawat Mehta, a close friend and strategist of Emperor Akbar became a historical person and came to be known as the saviour of Jainism during medieval period.

== Against rewards to Charans ==
Both Jain sources as well as Khayat of Dayaldas portray Raja Rai Singh as a very benevolent but extravagant personality. Judging from the marvellous liberality to Charans with which the ‘Khyat’ credits Rai Singh, he would appear to have had a great appreciation of poetry and every important circumstance of his life is attested by a ballad. As Dewan of the state, Karamchand had a guarded attitude in the interest of the state treasury and did not like this extravaganza on bards. Hence Karamchand often protested to the king over the rewards.

The bohemian between Raja Rai Singh and Dewan Karamchand could not last long and very soon tensions surfaced in their relationship.

== Bachhawats do not worship Dyadi Mata ==
Traditionally, on completion of Navratri festival, Dyadi Mata (Ashapura Mata; Kuldevi of Chauhans as Bachhawats are their descendants) is commonly worshipped by all castes in Rajasthan. Once, during the later part of the 16th century, when Karamchand was engaged in the worshipping of Dyadi Mata, a disciple of Jain Muni, the Maharajsaab, came to Bachhawat's Haveli (Mansion) for gochari (food and alms). Karamchand felt disturbed, and told the disciple to convey to Maharajsaab to come later for gochari. The Maharajsaab was displeased and through his spiritual powers, let Dyadi Mata's idol speak to Karamchand,

"You shall not worship me from now onwards. I shall not find any fault for doing so. I may be immersed in water. If your descendants remake a similar statue and purify (bathe) it in sawa mound of oil, the puja can recommence."

It is believed, that Maharajsaab then had the gold statue, weighing sawa mound (approx. 1500 kg) thrown into the family well just outside the haveli in Maneck Chowk. Hence the Bachhawats and the members of this ethnic group do not worship Dyadi Mata (Kuldevi), from that day.

== Foundation of Junagarh Fort at Bikaner ==
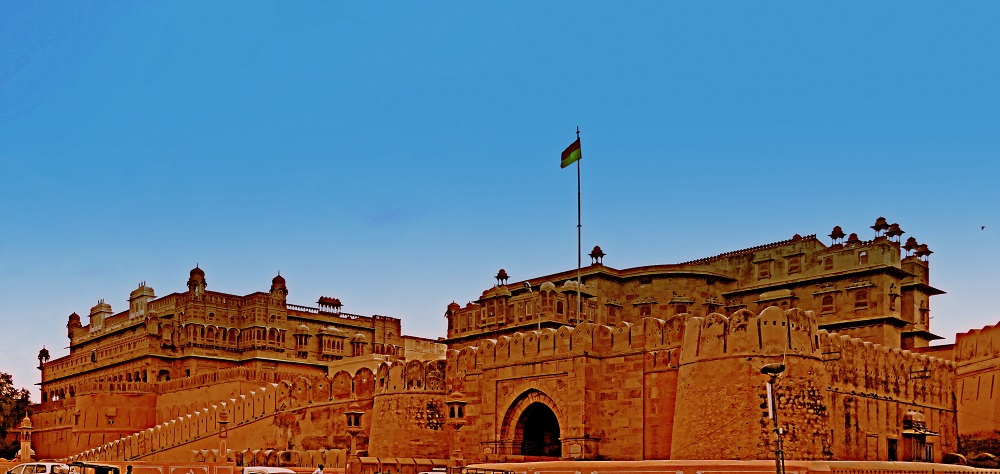
Junagarh Fort of Bikaner. Formerly Chintamani Fort built (1588-93) under supervision of Dewan Karamchand Bachhawat.

From 1585 to 1594 Raja Rai Singh of Bikaner was employed in the Deccan by Emperor Akbar, where he was Mansabdar of Burhanpur. While Rai Singh is said to have kept the petty chiefs under control and to have governed his province well, the administration of Bikaner was totally with Karamchand.

The royal family of Bikaner lived in the original small fortress built by Rao Bika, until Raja Rai Singh built a new fort called ‘Chintamani’. The ruins of the old fort can still be seen around the walled city, on Raati Ghati near Lakshmi Nathji temple. Whilst at Burhanpur he planned and ordered his minister, Karamchand to begin the construction of present fine fort of Bikaner in 1588. As Rai Singh was away, Karamchand laid the foundation stone of fort, named Chintamani Fort in 1588 and supervised its construction. Raja Rai Singh returned from his subah after nine years in 1594. In 1593, Emperor Akbar being mighty pleased with the military services and successful campaigns in Deccan and Gujarat by Raja Rai Singh, granted him with the jagirs of Junagarh (Saurashtra) and Burhanpur. In the early 20th century (1926) when the ruling family moved to Lalgarh Palace outside the fort limits, the original old fort was renamed as Junagarh, or ‘Old Fort’.

Completed in 1593, then Chintamani Fort, is an impressive fort of Northern India famous for its magnificent architecture, design and decoration. This Fort, also known as Bikaner Fort has withstood the ravages of time and has remained unconquered.

== Suspicion between Rai Singh and Karamchand ==
Capt PW Powlett writes in ‘Gazetteer of Bikaner State’,

“Karamchand established control over the polity of Bikaner and influenced some princes as well. The frequent absence of Raja Rai Singh of Bikaner to discharge his duties as Mansabdar was used by Karam Chand to establish his contacts at the Mughal court. This increasing proximity to Emperor Akbar was distancing Karamchand from his King. Karamchand had a dominating personality and whose proactive attitude overshadowed Rai Singh. The honours conferred on Karam Chand by Emperor Akbar made Raja Rai Singh jealous”.

One of the causes given by the historians is the breach of protocol. Karamchand was a good chess player and the Emperor Akbar would often ask him to play chess, seated opposite him in the Mughal court, while his master and other Rajas stood by in humble attendance. This was naturally most galling to Rai Singh, who conceived hatred towards his servant and sought to eliminate him after his return home from Burhanpur.

By 1591, tension started building up between the Rai Singh and Karamchand. Rai Singh discovered a conspiracy against his life. A conspiracy was hatched to dislodge Rai Singh from the gaddi (throne) of Bikaner. The prime mover behind the conspiracy was allegedly Karamchand, which was not true. It is also strange to say, notwithstanding the Raja's magnificent treatments of Brahmins and minstrel class, a Purohit (priest) also figure amongst the conspirators. The objective was to place Raja's eldest son Dalpat Singh or his brother Ram Singh on the throne, thus Karamchand monopolizing the power of the state. These rumours were spread by the detractors of Dewan Karamchand. Karamchand and his family, having received timely warning, escaped to Delhi, where they were well received at the court of Akbar.

It is further stated by Capt Powlet in Gazetteer of Bikaner State,

“They were made the supreme authority of Emperor Akbar and acquainted him with Bikaner secrets, an offence still held in native states to be one of the most heinous possible. But in other respects, Karamchand was now able to be a thorn in the side of the Raja Rai Singh”.

Capt Powlett further clarifies, “It must be understood that these expressions are those of the writers of Khyats”. The Khyats are written by Charans, a caste of warrior-poets who compose poems and stories of battles and heroes with the greatest of ease and keep alive the oral tradition. The stories are passed down from father to son. In a sense they are the early historians, and were respected to do so. However, another version of this story from ‘Karamchand Vansh-kavyam’ by Jaysom states,

“Raja Rai Singh turned against Karamchand and wanted to take revenge. Sensing development of ill will of Raja Rai Singh towards himself, Dewan Karamchand politely took permission to settle in Merta city along with his family members, to spend his time in the service of Parshvanath Swami and Shri Jindutt Surij at a nearby village of Phalodi. He was invited by Raja Man Singh of Amber (Jaipur), one of the famous 'Navaratnas' (the nine gems at the royal court of Akbar) and other kings but he refused as he had his singular loyalty towards Raja Rai Singh of Bikaner”.

== Invited to Lahore court by Akbar ==
Around 1591, Emperor Akbar being aware of the talent and loyalty of Dewan Karamchand sent a letter to invite him to his court at Lahore through Raja Rai Singh. On the orders of his king, Karamchand left Merta for Lahore along with his aides. He visited Ajmer en route to seek blessings at the memorial (stupa) of his guru Dada sahib Shri Jindutt Suri. When at Lahore he was immediately called in by the Emperor Akbar for an audience, whereas, people would wait for days to have audience. The Emperor knew everything about him and reassured Karamchand that his lost glory would be restored shortly.

Bhanwarlal Nahata writes in his book ‘Mantri Karamchand Bachhawat’,

“Emperor Akbar appointed Dewan Karamchand as Gajjadhikari (Head of State Council, Treasury &Stores). Emperor presented him with a hunting horse loaded with gold. He was also appointed as the Samrajyadhipati (Governor; स्म्राज्यधिपति) of Toshampur (now in Haryana) with appropriate number of elephants, horses and foot soldiers”.

It meant that all Kings and Mansabdars under Mughal Empire would have to first meet Dewan Karamchand before calling on Emperor.

== Acharya Jinchandra Suri invited to Lahore court ==
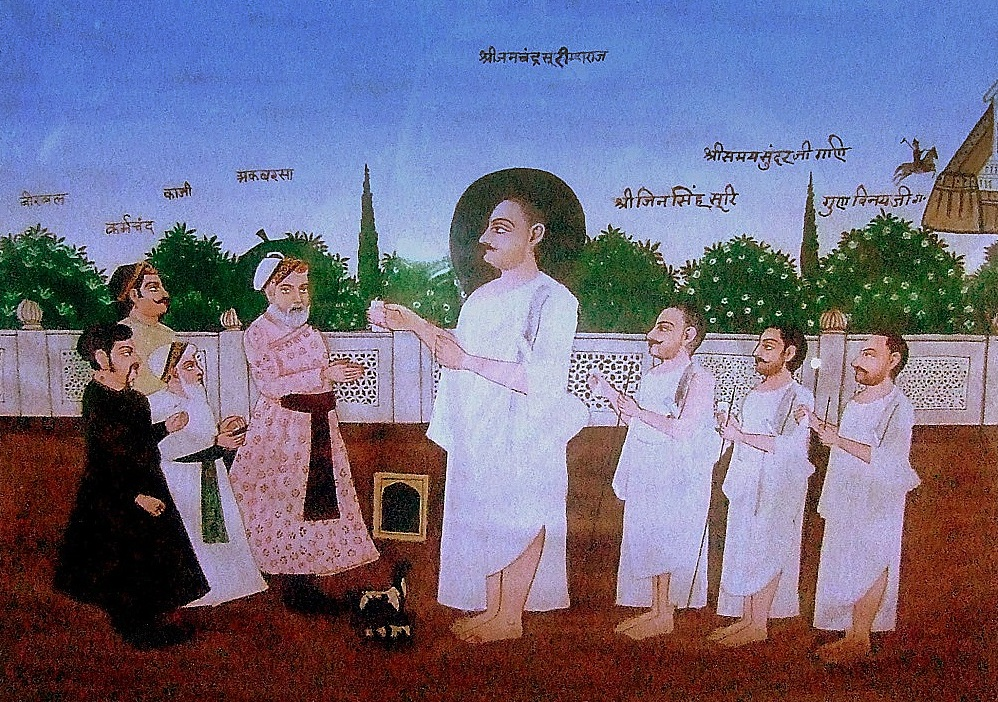
Acharya Jinchandra Suri with Akbar and Karam Chand at Lahore court

During one of the meetings with the learned religious people, Akbar asked the pundits, "Who was the most learned Jain philosopher?" The pundits replied, "Acharya Jinchandra Suri was one such person". Emperor asked, "Who is his disciple?" The pundits replied, "Dewan Karamchand".

Bhanwarlal Nahata of Prakrit Bharati Academy, Jaipur writes in his book ‘Mantri Karam Chand Bachhawat’ that Karamchand was summoned and ordered to invite his guru Maharaj as soon as possible. Accordingly, Acharya, who was then at Shatrunjay (Palitana, Saurashtra) reached Lahore after six months journey on foot, on 14 February 1592 along with 31 disciples on Eid day.

The Emperor, who was sitting in the balcony of the palace, came down to receive Acharya Jinchandra Suri and after exchanging pleasantries, he said,

“I have asked you to come here all the way from Gujarat to benefit from your thoughts at the religious meetings. I strongly believe in non-violence (ahimsa); therefore, you must visit my court to give audience, at least once every day so that there is spiritual awakening among my children”.

Having received the patronage of the Emperor, Acharya soon became popular and was well received by one and all at Lahore. He stayed there for over a year till next monsoon.

== Akbar proceeds to Kashmir by boat through river Jhelum ==
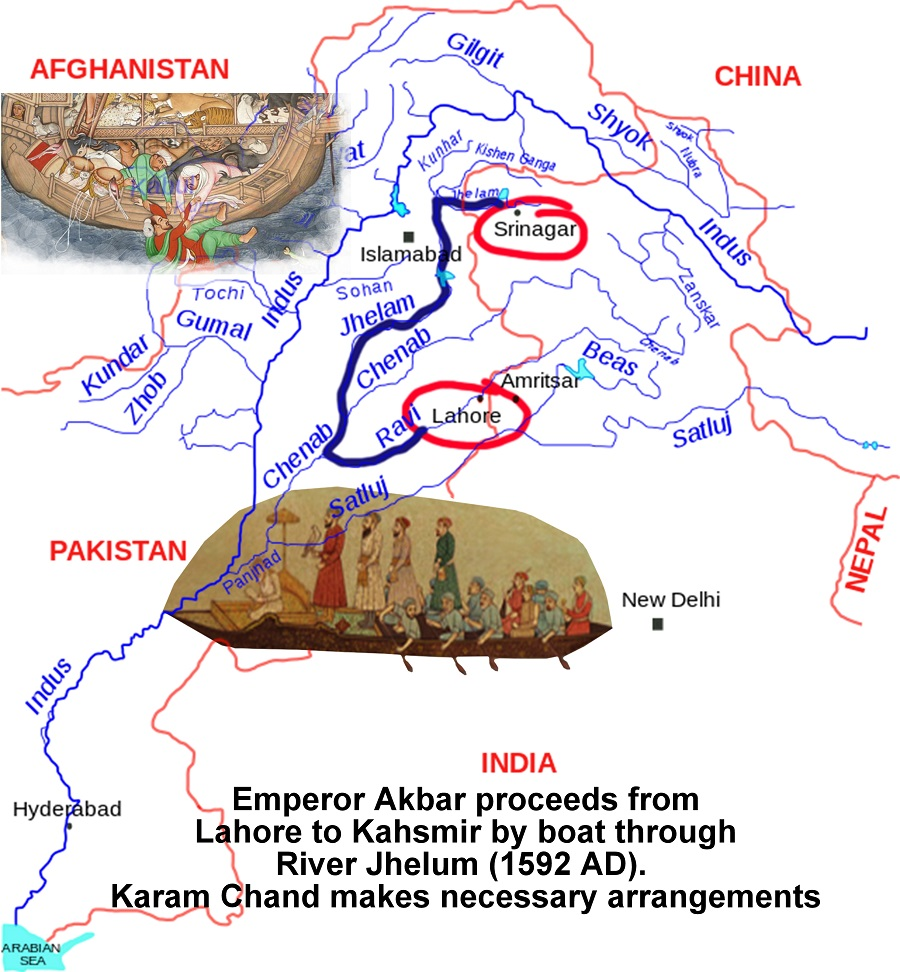
Jhelum river map - Akbar proceeds to Kashmir by boat

Jaysom notes in Karamchandra Vanshavali Prabandh, that Emperor Akbar, while in Lahore dealing with the Uzbeks had sought to subjugate the upper Indus valley to secure the frontier provinces. He sent an army to conquer Kashmir in the upper Indus basin. In 1585, Ali Shah surrendered immediately to the Mughals, but another of his sons, Yaqub, crowned himself as king, and led a stubborn resistance to Mughal armies. Finally, in June 1589, Akbar himself travelled from Lahore to Srinagar to receive the surrender of Yaqub and his rebel forces.

On another occasion in 1592, once again sensing trouble from rebels, Emperor Akbar then desired to go to Kashmir by boat through river Jhelum. He summoned Karamchand and asked him to make necessary preparations for the journey. Later, Emperor called for Acharya Jinchandra Suri for his darshan (audience) before proceeding to Kashmir. He told Karamchand to ensure that Acharya stays put comfortably in Lahore during his absence so that inter-religious spiritual discourses, kindness, mercy to all living beings (ahimsa) and protection of cows to continue in his empire. Accordingly, Emperor issued farmaans to his eleven subas to follow the instructions on ahimsa. Many kings and sultans, to please the Emperor, also issued orders to protect living beings on certain days in their kingdom.

Akbar asked Karamchand and Vachak Mahimraj Man Singh, the senior Jain preacher & story teller, to accompany him to Kashmir. Karamchand made elaborate arrangements, such as tents, logistics, also vegetarian food cooked by Brahmin, a mahatma and tantric to accompany the entourage for warding off any evil en route, etc. Akbar, stopped enroute at Rohtaspur with his entourage. During this second visit to Kashmir on 7 October 1592, the great Moghul enjoyed the saffron blossom at Pampore and celebrated the festival of Diwali. On this occasion the boats on the banks of river Jhelum and the roofs of the houses in Srinagar were illuminated at the Emperor's command. However, sensing trouble from the rebels, Karamchand, the most trustworthy and gallant official was dispatched for the protection of imperial Anantnag at the behest of Emperor. Karamchand faced stiff resistance but successfully captured the rebels without any bloodshed.

== Karamchand Bachhawat passes away ==
In 1605, the Emperor Akbar died. Karamchand Vanshho-KirtankamKavyam (1594) by Jaysom observes,

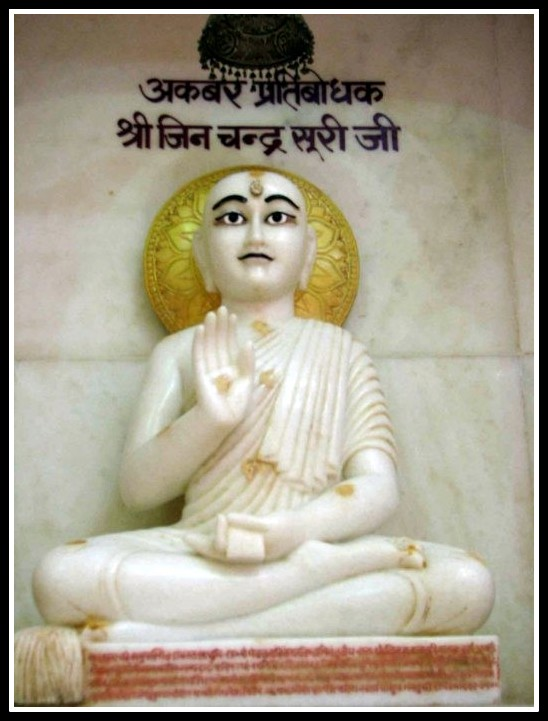
Acharya Jinchandra Suri, guru of Karam Chand

“On the accession of Jahangir as Emperor of India, Raja Rai Singh went to Delhi. He also called on ailing Karamchand to wish him good health and apologise for the past. He also expressed his condolences on demise of Akbar and wept profusely in front of Karamchand”.

After Raja Rai Singh went away, Karamchand called his sons, Bhagchand and Lakshmichand. He praised Raja Rai Singh but at the same time cautioned them that these were crocodile tears and not of love and affection. He said,

“Raja Rai Singh is happy that I shall shortly pass away and regretted that he was unable to take revenge of the past. My dear children! Don’t you make a mistake of ever returning to Bikaner”.

He died at Delhi after Emperor Akbar's death between 1605 and 1607. Capt PW Powlett writes in ‘Gazetteer of Bikaner State’,

“It is interesting to note, whether Karamchand’s presence at Mughal court was only due to his personal rapport with the Emperor Akbar or due to his linkages with the Jain religious circles close to Akbar. It is yet to be established whether he was kept at the court as a bulwark against the house of Bikaner to maintain a system of checks and balances. Thus, revenge was inevitable from Rai Singh and despite showing sympathy for the Bachhawat family he could not pursue Karamchand or his sons to return to Bikaner. Thus, the hero of Jain tradition became the villain of the royal house of Bikaner and the Rajput traditions”.

Bachhawat Karamchand was a very cultured person and was indeed loyal to the king like his fore fathers. Later, Dewan Karamchand Bachhawat Mehta, a close friend and strategist of Emperor Akbar became a historical person.

== Dying wish of Raja Rai Singh for Bachhawats ==
Captain Powlett writes in ‘Gazetteer of Bikaner State’, that immediately after the death of Karamchand, Raja Rai Singh was again reappointed as the Mansabdar of Burhanpur. After a visit to Bikaner, he set off for Deccan with his son Sur Singh and governed there successfully for seven years. In 1612 he fell ill and Sur Singh seeing that his father's end was approaching, with folded hands asked for his last injunctions. Dying Raja Rai Singh said,

“Bachhawats, the family of Karamchand should be enticed to Bikaner that on them should be visited the sins of their father. The Purohit Man Mahesh and Bharat Chotji and the other conspirators such as Bharta Jat, associated with Karamchand should receive the reward of their misdeeds”.

Having exacted a promise that his wishes should be attended to, the Raja Rai Singh expired in 1612.

Dalpat ascended the throne of Bikaner in 1612. He earned the displeasure of Emperor at Delhi and that of his younger brother Sur Singh. Due to Dalpat's unpopularity that his nobles fell away from him and openly or secretly united with Sur Singh. Later, Sur Singh revolted against his elder brother Dalpat Singh and killed him along with his guards with the consent of Emperor Jahangir. Dalpat's wives at Bikaner were slaughtered and those at Bhatner became sati with Dalpat's turban in their hands.

== Bravery and heroism of Bachhawats at Bikaner ==
Sur Singh ascended the throne of Bikaner in 1613. Around 1619, Raja Sur Singh went to Delhi to pay his obeisance to Emperor Jahangir, where he was restored 11 mansabs by the Emperor. He also called on Bhagchand & Lakshmichand, sons of late Dewan Karamchand. He took them in absolute confidence and invited them to Bikaner. He went so far as to dismiss his minister, to give the office to Bhagchand and Lakshmichand. Both sons of Karamchand did not remember their father's advice and started in good faith for Bikaner. They were appointed as Mantris very respectfully. Raja Sur Singh remained extra benevolent towards these brothers in the following months. He also accepted the invitation to visit the Bachhawat haveli, wherein the Bachhawat brothers gave a nazrana (offerings to king) of one lakh rupee and other gifts for the felicitation of the King. Jinsaar Suri Raas, written in 1623 mentions that around 1619 Acharya Jinsagar Suri was hosted at Bikaner by Mantri Bhagchand and his nephew Manohar Das.

The Bachhawats thereupon were resettled in Bikaner but one fine morning at daybreak by treachery their quarters were surrounded by 4000 royal troops of Bikaner and they soon perceived that their destruction was intended. Though they belonged to one bania (trader) caste, they had, like many of their class who lived amongst and held office under Rajputs, imbibed much of the Rajput spirit and they resolved to die hard. At that time Bhagchand was resting and his brother Lakshmichand and his son Manohar Das were at the Durbar. Lakshmichand's wife announced with both pride and anger,

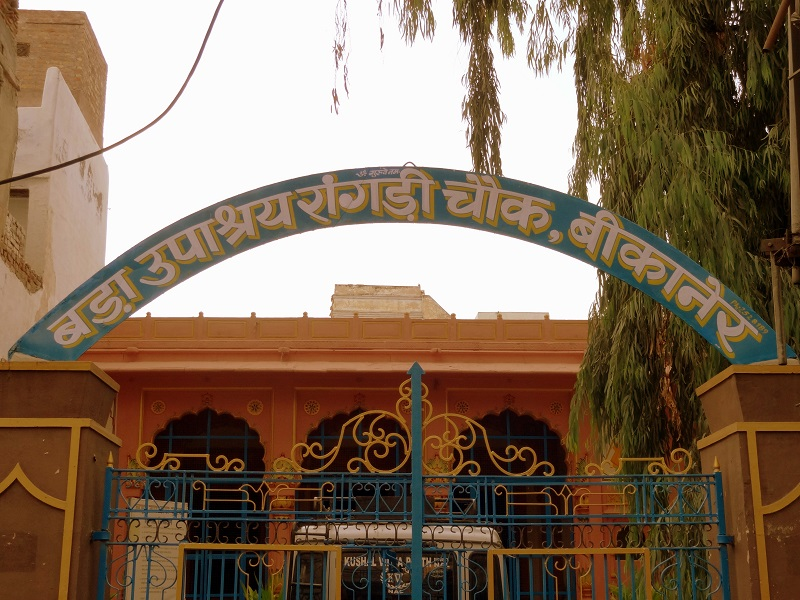
Bada Upasara built by Dewan Sangram Singh Bachhawat at Rangdi ka Chowk, Bikaner

“The royal forces have surrounded our haveli. If I have your permission I shall adorn men’s uniform and show them my power”.

Upon which Bhagchand refused permission and himself, after destroying their valuable jewels and sword in hand, fell upon the Rajputs of Rai Singh. The brave Bachhawats retaliated by their well-trained 500 guards. But the guards of Bachhawats could not withstand the mighty power of royal soldiers for a long. The wives of Karamchand, Lakshmichand, Manohar Das and the other women of Bachhawat household killed themselves by Jal-Johar (jumping into the haveli well), whilst their men died fighting royal soldiers. Lakshmichand and Manohar Das who were in Durbar were killed there.

== Bachhawats exterminated by deceit ==
In Rangdi-ka-Chowk (formerly Maneck Chowk), opposite Bada Upasara there used to be a well owned by Bachhawats, which was later closed, and a platform built. Today, a ‘Hanuman Mandir' stands tall on its side. This was the well, in which Bachhawat women performed Jal-Johar to protect their honour when troops of Sur Singh invaded their quarters.

However, the Raja Sur Singh failed in total exterminating the Bachhawats, since one pregnant lady, Mewariji, (Jigishabai) wife of Bhag Chand, was not allowed to sacrifice herself. She, with the assistance of a trusted servant Raghunath escaped to Karni Mata temple at Deshnoke. As per convention the pregnant lady was granted safe passage to return to her father’s home at Udaipur. Mewariji (Jigishabai) was the daughter of Bhamashah, then Pradhan of Mewar state during Maharana Pratap’s time. Thus, Karamchand and Bhamashah were related through marriage alliance between their son and daughter respectively.

Capt PW Powlett writes in ‘Gazetteer of Bikaner State’,

“In the same year that the slaughter of the Bachhawats occurred, Sur Singh further carried out the dying behest of his father by confiscating the jagirs of the descendants of conspirators, Purohit Man Mahesh and Bharat Chotaji. Thereafter, these people came to Bikaner (Chintamani / Junagarh) Fort and protested outside Karanpol and were intentionally not stopped from self-immolation during the protest. Another of those denounced by the late Raja Rai Singh, a Bharta Jat was also killed mercilessly”.

Mohammed Iqbal in his book ‘Bikaner Rajya ka Itihas – Kuch Anchue Pahelu’ notes that these events were heart breaking and were considered inauspicious for the state. In the act of showing regret and repentance for all the killings, Raja Sur Singh built a lake on the spot where self-immolation by Brahmins was carried out. The lake later came to be known as Sur Sagar. It is said that due to bad omen, the water of the lake from time to time gets mysteriously polluted by some underground water source and needs to be cleaned periodically.

== Epilogue ==
Dewan Karamchand Bachhawat Mehta was a brilliant administrator, clever strategist, suave politician and a very cultured person. He is also well known as the saviour of Jainism during medieval period. He was indeed loyal to the king like his forefathers. The hero of Jain tradition who became the villain of the royal house of Bikaner is a historical person.

== See also ==
- History of Bikaner
