= Cinco Villas =

Cinco Villas may refer to:

- Cinco Villas, Navarra, a comarca of Spain
- Cinco Villas, Aragon, Spain
