= Vilas Park Mound Group =

- U.S. National Register of Historic Places
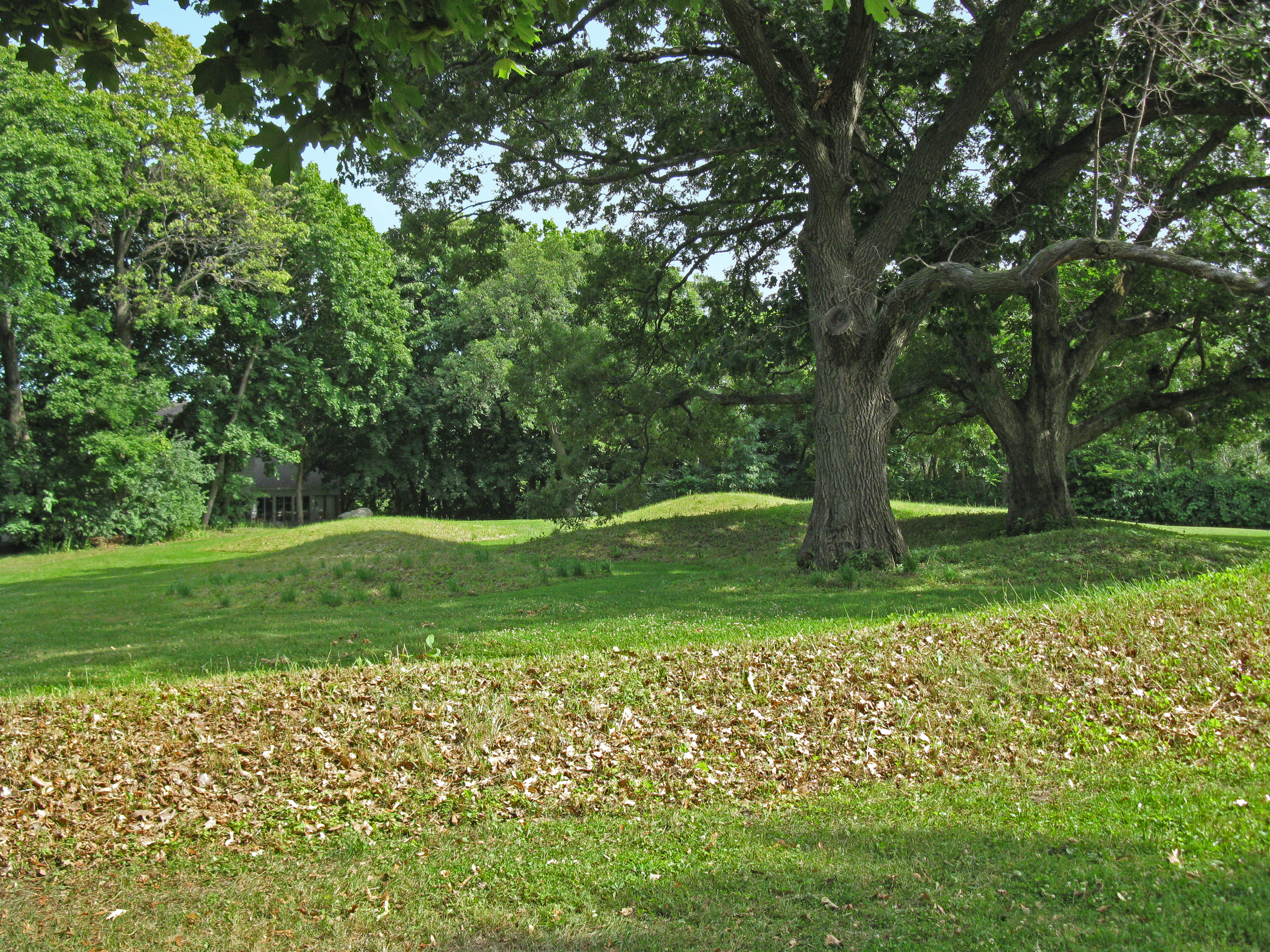

- Location within Wisconsin Location within the United States
- Location: Vilas Park, Madison, Wisconsin
- Coordinates: 43°03′34″N 89°24′29″W
- Area: less than one acre
- MPS: Late Woodland Stage in Archeological Region 8 MPS
- NRHP reference No.: 91000357
- Added to NRHP: April 10, 1991

The Vilas Park Mound Group is a group of Native American mounds in Vilas Park in Madison, Wisconsin. The group includes a bird effigy, a linear mound, and six conical mounds. It originally included another bird effigy and two additional conical mounds, but development destroyed these mounds and damaged two of the existing ones.

Mound Builder peoples built the mounds between 800 and 1100 A.D., during the Late Woodland period, to serve as burial and cultural sites. While the Madison area was once home to over 1,000 mounds, all but roughly 200 have been destroyed, making the Vilas Park group more significant as a potential source of information about Late Woodland traditions.

The mounds were added to the National Register of Historic Places on April 10, 1991.
