= Margaret Van Pelt Vilas =

American architect (1905–1995)

Margaret Van Pelt Vilas (1905–1995) was an architect active in New York City and New Haven, Connecticut beginning in the 1930s through the 1960s. In 1958, she opened her own practice based in New Haven and continued to practice throughout the 1960s, becoming very active in Pan-American architectural relations through the AIA. She died in 1995, at the age of 90.

== Education ==
Margaret Van Pelt was born in Ithaca, New York on January 26, 1905 to John Vredenburgh Van Pelt and Betsey Southworth.

She attended Vassar College, graduating Phi Beta Kappa in 1925, and then obtained a Bachelor of Architecture from Columbia University in 1928 and subsequently a Master of Architecture from MIT in 1930.

== Career ==
Van Pelt began her career with an early partnership 1926-1930 with her father, a prominent architect and architectural professor, in New York City from 1926 to 1930. In 1930, she traveled throughout Europe for a year, where she was impressed and inspired by the prolific use of glass and metal, particularly in Germany. In 1933, she began work as a draftsman at the firm of Mayers, Murray & Phillip in New York City; she then moved to the firm of Aymar Embury in 1936, where she worked as a renderer. From 1936 to 1942, she worked as a draftsman with the Department of Public Works in the Department of Hospitals and the Department of Parks.

During World War II from 1942 to 1945, she completed a tool design course at Yale University and worked as a designer at M.B. Manufacturing Company in New Haven, CT. The company was known during WWII for producing airplane parts.

She began working for the Connecticut-based office of Douglas Orr in 1946, remaining there for twelve years until 1958, when she established her own firm based in New Haven, Connecticut. By 1962, she was a registered architect in Connecticut, New York, and Rhode Island, and had completed residential, commercial, and educational projects throughout the United States.

During the 1960s, she became active in her local AIA chapter, serving as the AIA delegate to the X Panamerican Federation of Architects Congress in Buenos Aires; in 1961 and 1962, she was Chairman of the AIA delegation to the first and second round tables of Pan American Federation of Architects in Lima, Peru and São Paulo, Brasil. She remained active in the Panamerican Congress of Architects into 1965, when she was Chairman of the "Themes" committee at the Joint AIA convention and Congress.

As one of the few practicing female architects in the early 1930s, she declared in a 1931 interview: "I don't believe there is such a thing as a woman's point of view in architecture. There is architecture that is good and that is bad."

== Personal life ==
Van Pelt married Charles Harrison Vilas in 1932 in Patchogue, Long Island at the summer home of her parents. Vilas worked in the printing industry for Paper Mills of Chicago, and the two became avid sailors. Their daughter Diana Van Pelt Vilas born in March 1939.

She died in 1995, at the age of 90, in New Haven, CT.

== Built works ==
Memorial Bench of Andrew Hasewell Green, Central Park, New York City

Seaman's Church Institute, New York City, ground floor renovation (1959)

Residence of Mrs. Ely Grlswold, Old Lyme, Conn (1961)

Res. of John V. Van Pelt, Birmingham, Alabama (1961)

== Awards ==
Phi Beta Kappa, Vassar College, 1925

Warren Prize, Beaux Arts Institute of Design, 1930

Henry Adams Prize, B.A.LD, 1928

== Publications ==
Illustrations in "From Here to There... With Nothing But the Wind," by Charles H. Vila, in Cruising World. Vol. 1, No. 6 (1975): 42-46.

Illustrations in "Triple Roller Headsails," by Charles H. Vila, in The Best Of Sail Trim
