= Samuel Vila =

Spanish pastor (1902–1992)

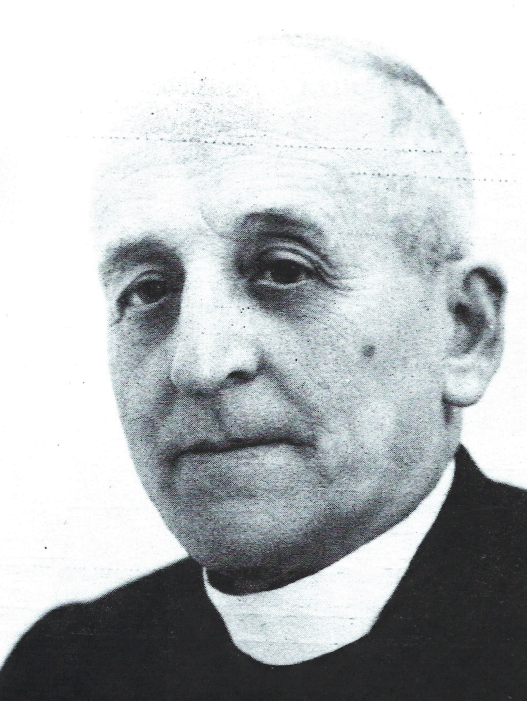
- Born: 28 May 1902; Rubí
- Died: 1 March 1992 (aged 89); Terrassa
- Occupation: Pastor

Samuel Vila i Ventura (Rubí, Barcelona, May 28, 1902 – Terrassa, March 1, 1992) was an evangelical pastor, writer, and editor from Spain. His life was marked by a commitment to the Gospel from an early age, influenced by his parents.

== Biography ==
Vila was born into an evangelical family. From his childhood, he showed an inclination for serving the Gospel. At the age of six, he was already printing biblical verses to share the "message of salvation." His dedication to Christian ministry led him to study under the guidance of Rubén Dubarry in Nîmes, (France), a disciple in turn of Charles Spurgeon.

In 1923, he joined the seminary of the Southern Baptist Mission in Barcelona as a teacher and theology student. He founded the evangelical church in Terrassa in 1924 and that of Manresa 1933. During the Spanish Civil War, he went into exile and organized aid to The Republicans in France. In 1939, he returned to Spain and led the church in Terrassa, facing the restrictions of the Francoist dictatorship and defending religious freedom.

== Awards and recognitions ==
Throughout his life, Vila received significant recognition for his work. In 1970, he was awarded an honorary doctorate, and in 1991, he was named a member of the Spanish language academy by the North American Academy.

== Works ==
Vila stood out as a prolific writer from the age of 22 with his first book, "A las fuentes del cristianismo" (1924). His work includes 45 titles, spanning dictionaries, encyclopedias, and translations of 193 works from English and French into Spanish. He founded the Publications Department of the Spanish Christian Mission, which evolved into Editorial CLIE.
