= Nagarparkar Jain temples =

Cluster of abandoned temples in Sindh, Pakistan

Nagarparkar Jain Temples
- نگرپارکر جین مندر (Urdu)
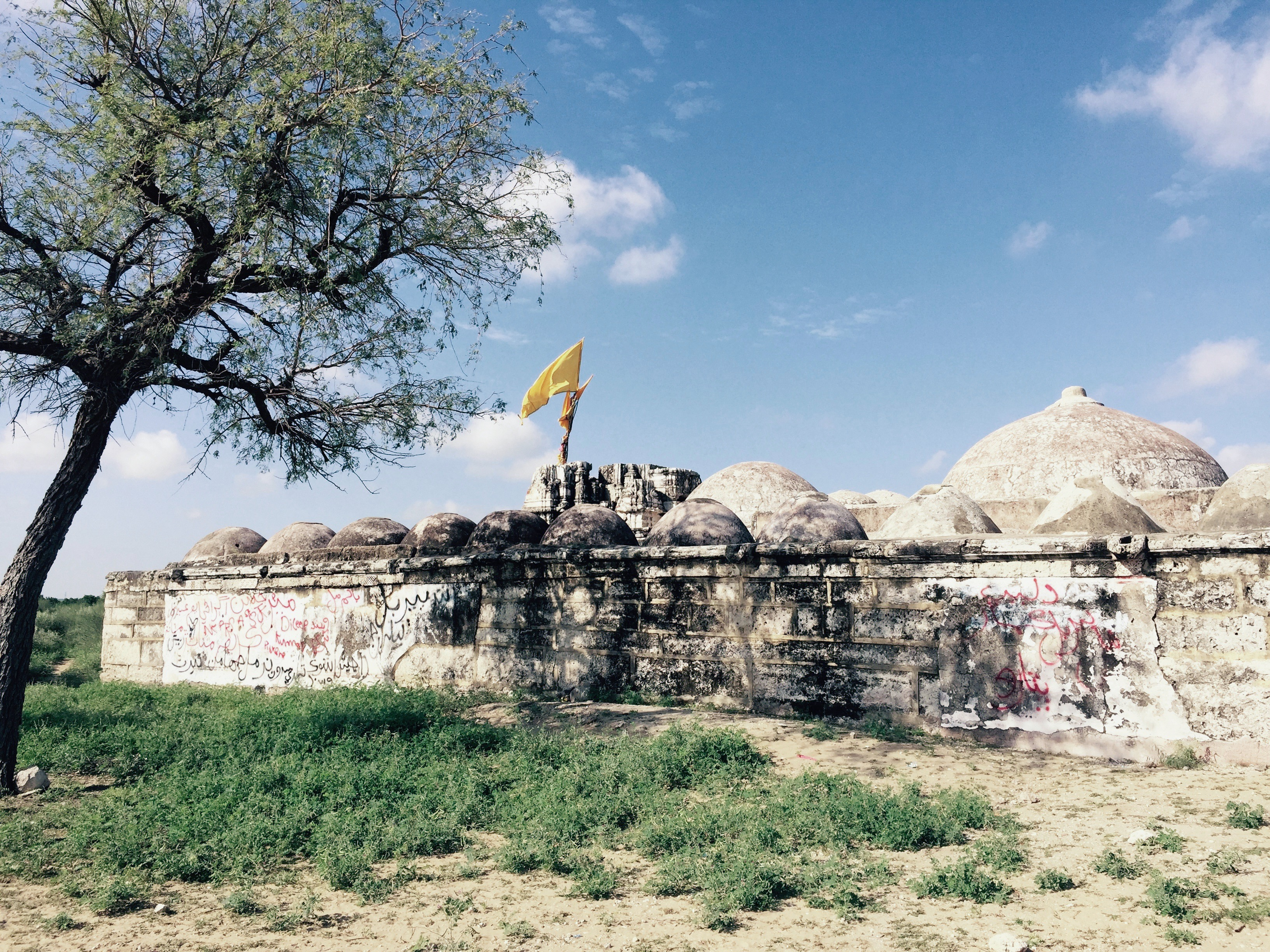
- The temples were an important pilgrimage site for Jains until the 19th century, when the changing coastline had resulted in much of the Jain population shifting to nearby regions

- Location within Sindh Location within Pakistan
- 24°21′21″N 70°45′16″E
- Type: Jain temples and mosque
- Location: Karoonjhar Mountains, Sindh, Pakistan

The Nagarparkar Jain Temples (Urdu: نگرپارکر جین مندر) are located in the region around Nagarparkar, in Pakistan's southern Sindh province. The site consists of a collection of abandoned Śvetāmbara Jain temples, as well as a mosque heavily influenced by the architectural style of the temples. Buildings in the region date from the 12th to the 15th centuries - a period when Jain architectural expression was at its zenith. Frescoes at the Gori Temple are the oldest Jain frescoes still in existence in the northern regions of the Indian subcontinent. The temples were inscribed on the tentative list for UNESCO World Heritage status in 2016 as the Nagarparkar Cultural Landscape.

== Background ==
The region around Nagarparkar forms a zone of transition between the marshes and salt-flats of the Rann of Kutch, and the dry grounds of stabilized sand dunes and nearby pink-granite Karoonjhar Mountains. The region had been mostly covered by the Arabian Sea until the 15th century, though the region around Nagarparkar formed an area of raised and perennially dry land.

Nagarparkar was a centre of Jainism for several centuries, and the wealthy local Jain community built several extravagant temples in the nearby hills between the 12th and 15th centuries - considered a high point of Jain architectural expression. The region became a place of pilgrimage known as Sardhara, with Jain ascetics establishing themselves in the Karoonjhar Mountains. The Nagarparkar region was described in 1650 as the "most glorious of all regions of India".

Jain influence in the region began to decline due to shifting of the Arabian Sea away from centres of Jain economic activity, as silt from the Indus River deposited in the Rann of Kutch. Changes in the coast line resulted in a large-scale shift of the local Jain population in the 19th century, while remaining Jains left the area following the Partition of British India in 1947, though several of the temples continue to be maintained by the area's sizable Hindu community. Several new temples were built in nearby Rajasthan, which trace their heritage back to older sites in Nagarparkar.

The remains of a number of Jain temples are popular tourist attractions and heritage sites in the region. A lack of an adequate road system in the area contributed to the site's state of good preservation, though the recent construction of roadways has led to a surge of tourists, despite the lack of adequate protection at the site. In 2009, satellite imagery was employed to document the site, and to help devise a plan to manage tourism.

The region was submitted by the Pakistani government in 2016 to be inscribed on the tentative list of UNESCO World Heritage Site status, not only for its architectural value, but also as reflection of Jainism as part of a commercial community based on maritime trade, and the effects of a changing natural environment around the region.

== Jain temples ==
Approximately 14 Jain temples are scattered throughout the region.

=== Gori Temple ===
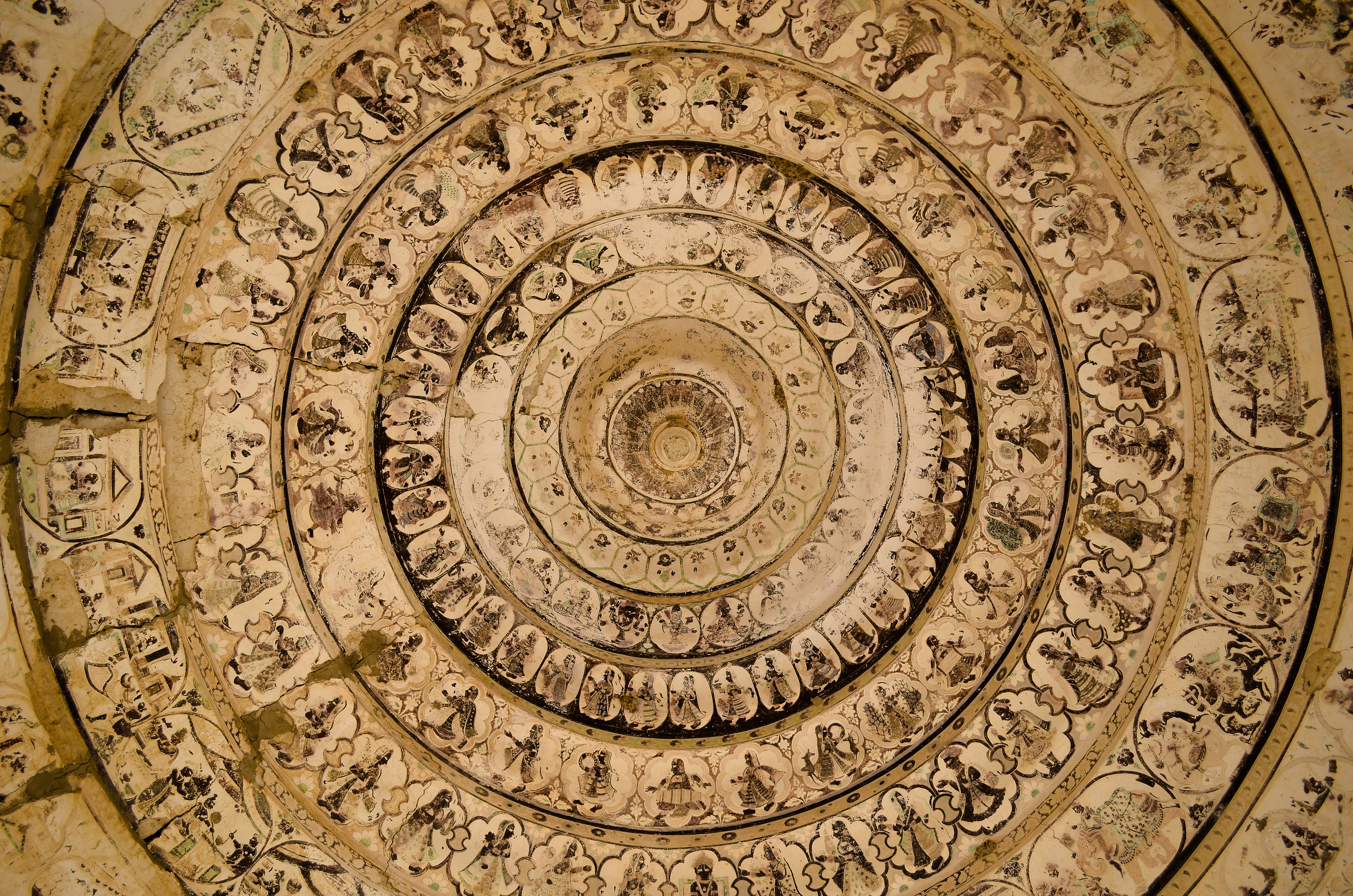
Frescoes at the Gori Temple are the oldest existing Jain frescoes in the world.

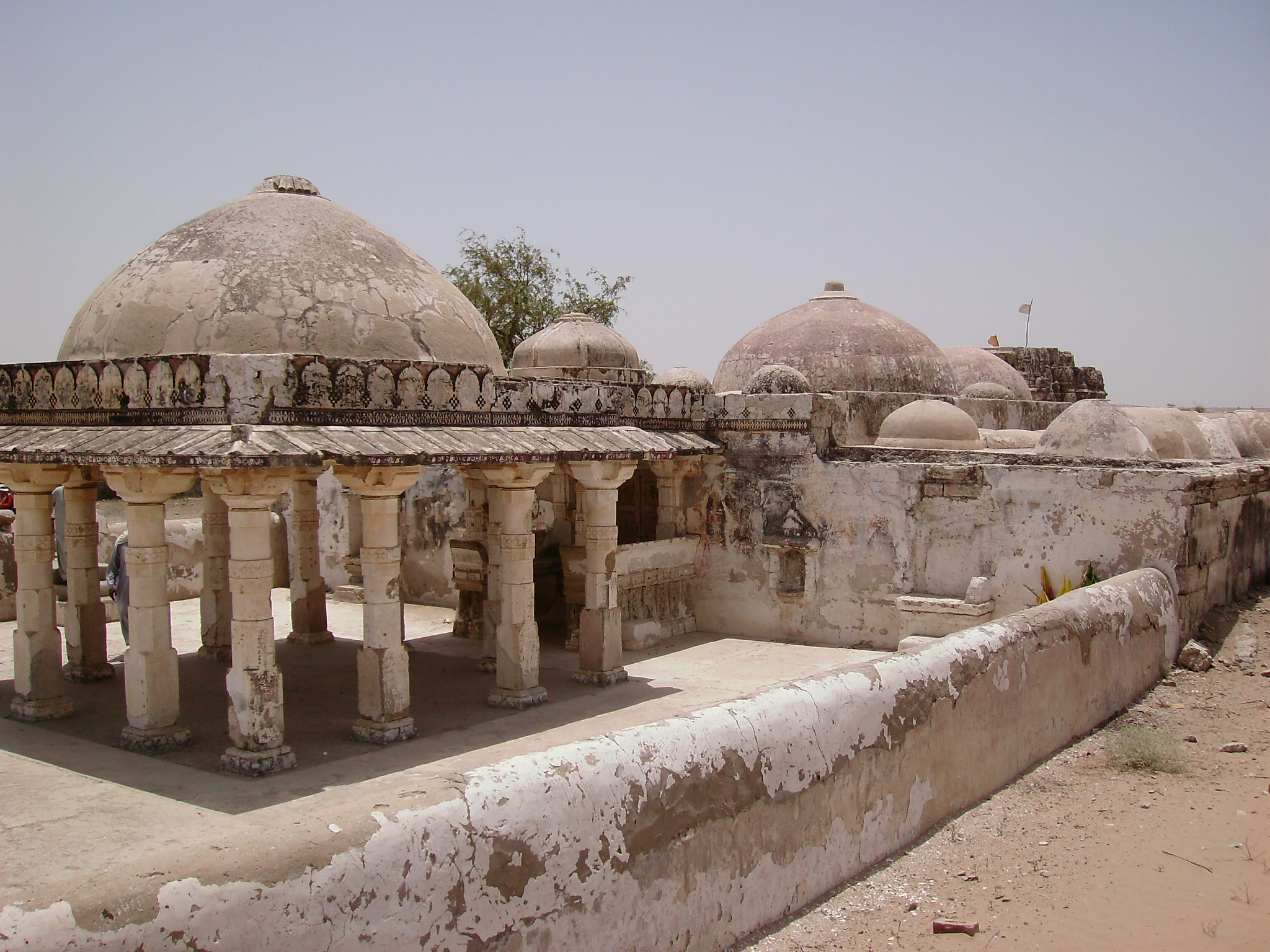
The Gori Temple features several domes and canopies.

The Gori Temple is located approximately 14 miles northwest of the Viravah Temple. The temple was built in 1375-1376 CE, in a Gujarati-style, and features 3 mandaps, with 52 Islamic-style domes. The temple measures 125 feet by 60 feet, and is built of marble. The entire temple is built on a high platform that is reached by a series of steps carved into stone.

The interiors of the temple feature finely carved marble pillars. The canopy which offers entrance to the temple is decorated with paintings that represent Jain mythology. The frescoes at Gori temple are the oldest Jain frescoes in existence in the northern portion of the Indian subcontinent.

24 small cells are found throughout the temple, which may have been used to house representations of the 24 Tirthankaras of Jainism.

==== Significance ====
For several centuries, the temple at Goripur was a celebrated Jain tirtha. The temple is notable amongst local Hindus as well for its image of Parasnath.

An account of its building is contained in "Gaudi Parshvanath Stavan" by Pritivimala, composed in Samvat 1650 and "Shri Gaudi Parshvanath Stavan" written by Nemavijaya in Samvat 1807. According to Muni Darshanvijaya, it was installed by Seth Godidas of Jhinjhuvad and was consecrated by Acharya Hemachandra at Patan in Samvat 1228. It was brought to Patan and was buried underground for safekeeping during a period of disturbance. It was rediscovered in 1375-76 and was stored in the stable of the local ruler.

According to the texts, a merchant 500 years ago named Manga Oswal from Nagarparkar had gone to Pattan to purchase some items. He was informed in a dream that an image was buried under the house of a local Muslim that Oswal was instructed to acquire. Oswal bought the image by paying 125 dramma or 500 pieces (taka), and was instructed in another dream to place the image on a cart and to move forward without looking back. The cart is said to have broken down near Nagarparkar, where Oswal then fell asleep. In his next dream, he was informed that underneath him lay marble and treasure, and instructed him to recruit craftsmen to build a fine temple in which to worship the idol, which was bestowed with the name Gori. The temple's construction was supervised by an architect from Sirohi, while the shikhar of the temple was completed by his son Mahio. The image was formally reconsecrated by Acharya Merutunga Suri of Anchala Gachchha, thus establishing the Gori Parshvanth Tirth, and the temple as a place of pilgrimage for Jains from afar.

The image is said to have disappeared in 1835. The temple was visited by Stanley Napier Raikes in 1854, who met local Jains to compile recent history and consulted Goorjee Kuntvujajee who had manuscripts describing the history of the temple. The temple was damaged by British troops who tried to capture a Sodha chief who had led a local rebellion.

=== Nagarparkar Bazaar Temple ===
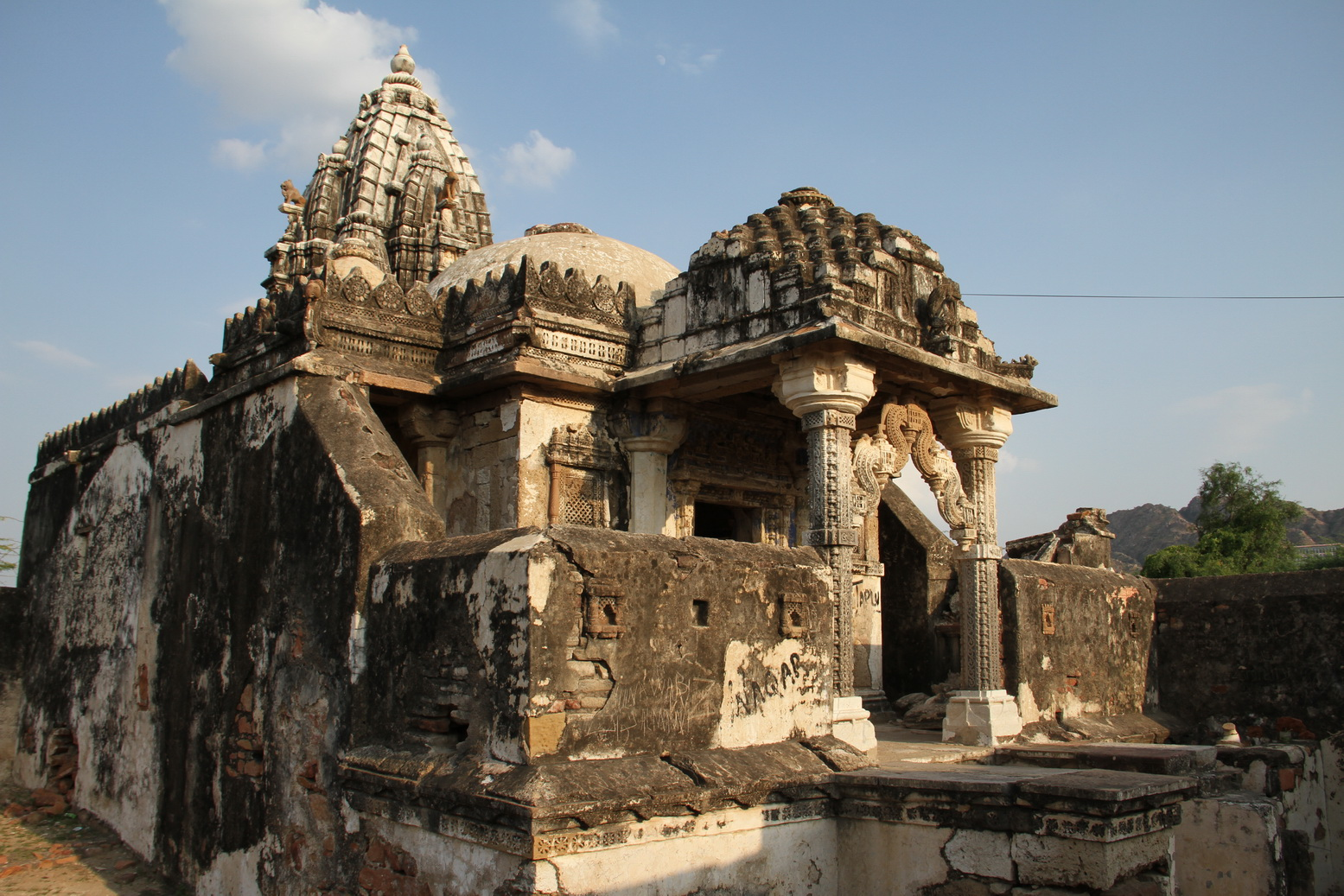
The Nagarparkar Bazaar temple

The Nagarparkar Bazaar Temple was built main bazar of the Nagarparkar town. The temple is remarkable for its intricately carved sculptures and paintings. The structure of the temple, including its shikhara and the torana gateway is completely intact. It was in use until the independence of Pakistan in 1947, and perhaps for some years even after that.

=== Bhodesar Temples ===
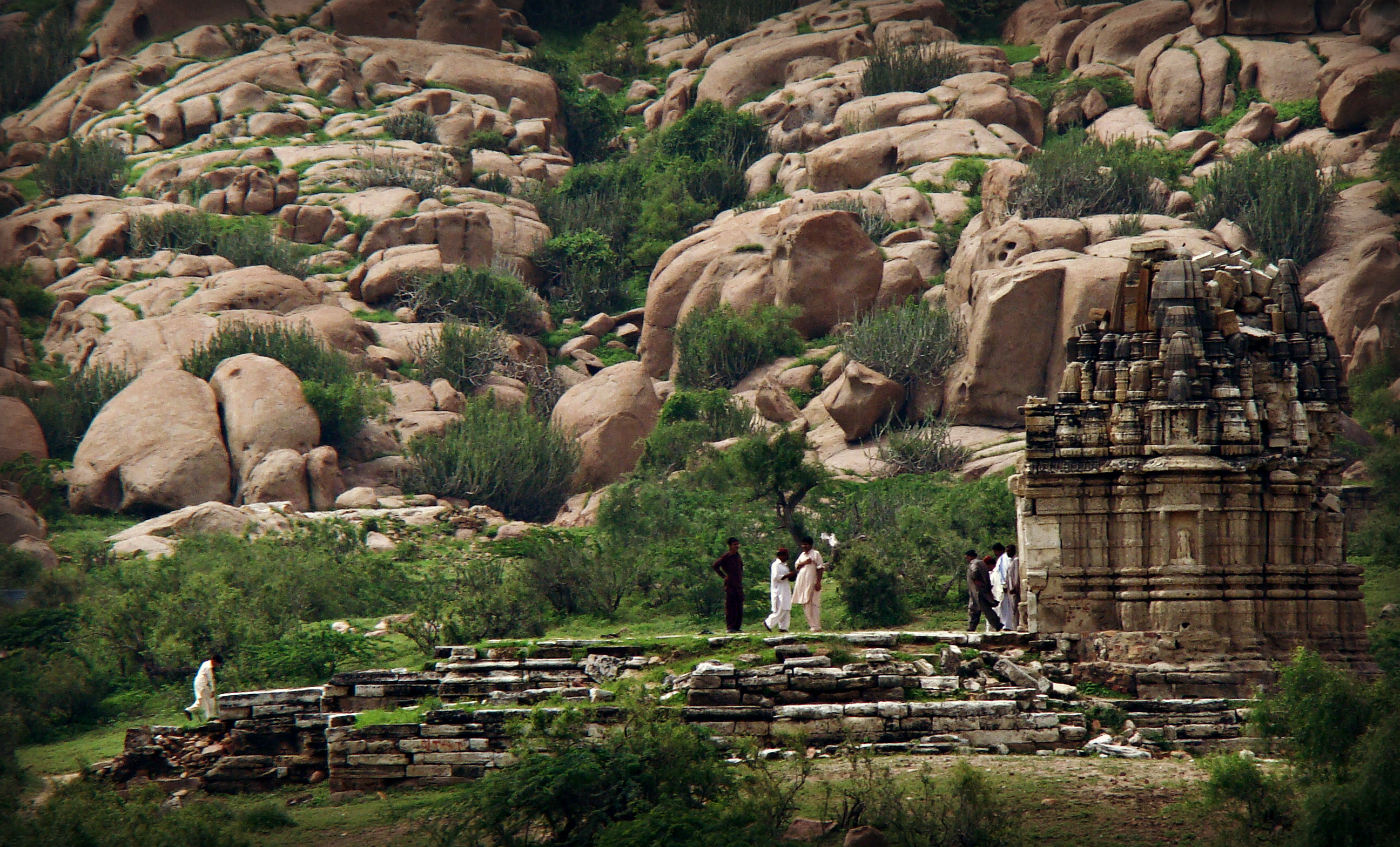
The Bhodesar Temple is at the base of the Karoonjhar Mountains.

Bhodesar, 4 miles from Nagar, features the ruins of three Jain temples. Bhodesar was the region's capital during Sodha rule. Two of the three temples were used as cattle sheds, while the third was noted in 1897 to be in disrepair with holes in the back. An ancient water tank, known as Bhodesar Talao, was also built in the nearby hills.

The oldest temple, was built in the classical style with stones without any mortar, built around the 9th century CE, by a Jain woman named Poni Daharo. It is built on a high platform and reached by a series of steps carved into the rock. It has beautifully carved huge stone columns and other structural elements. The remaining walls are unstable and partially collapsed. Parts of the building had been dismantled by the locals who used the bricks to construct their homes.

The two other Jain temples are said to have been built in 1375 CE and 1449 CE, built of kanjur and redstone, with fine carvings and corbelled domes.

=== Viravah Jain Temples ===
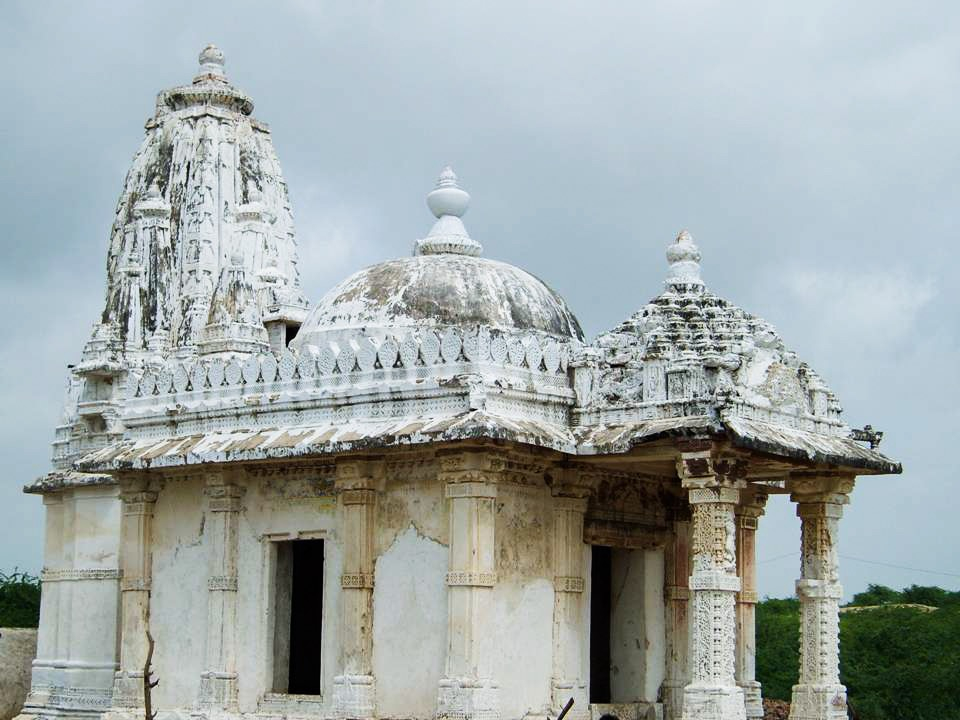
The Viravah site is home to an abandoned, but well-preserved, temple.

The Viravah Temples were 3 temples that are located near the town of Viravah, about 15 miles north of Nagarparkar. The site is near the ruins of the ancient seaport of Parinagar on the edge of the Rann of Kutch. The area once had three temples, which are said to have been founded in 456 CE by Jeso Parmāra.

One of the temples was in use during the British era, and is well-preserved and made of white marble. Another temple had a block of finely carved marble which was transferred to the Karachi Museum during the British era. The third ruined temple has 26 small domes surrounding a large central dome measuring 18 feet in diameter. The central dome features fine stone tracing It contains carved stone pillars with carved capitals.

During construction of a nearby road, workers accidentally discovered numerous Jain statues, which were then placed by locals in the remaining abandoned temple, while others were taken to the museum in Umerkot.

== Architectural impact ==
=== Bhodesar Mosque ===
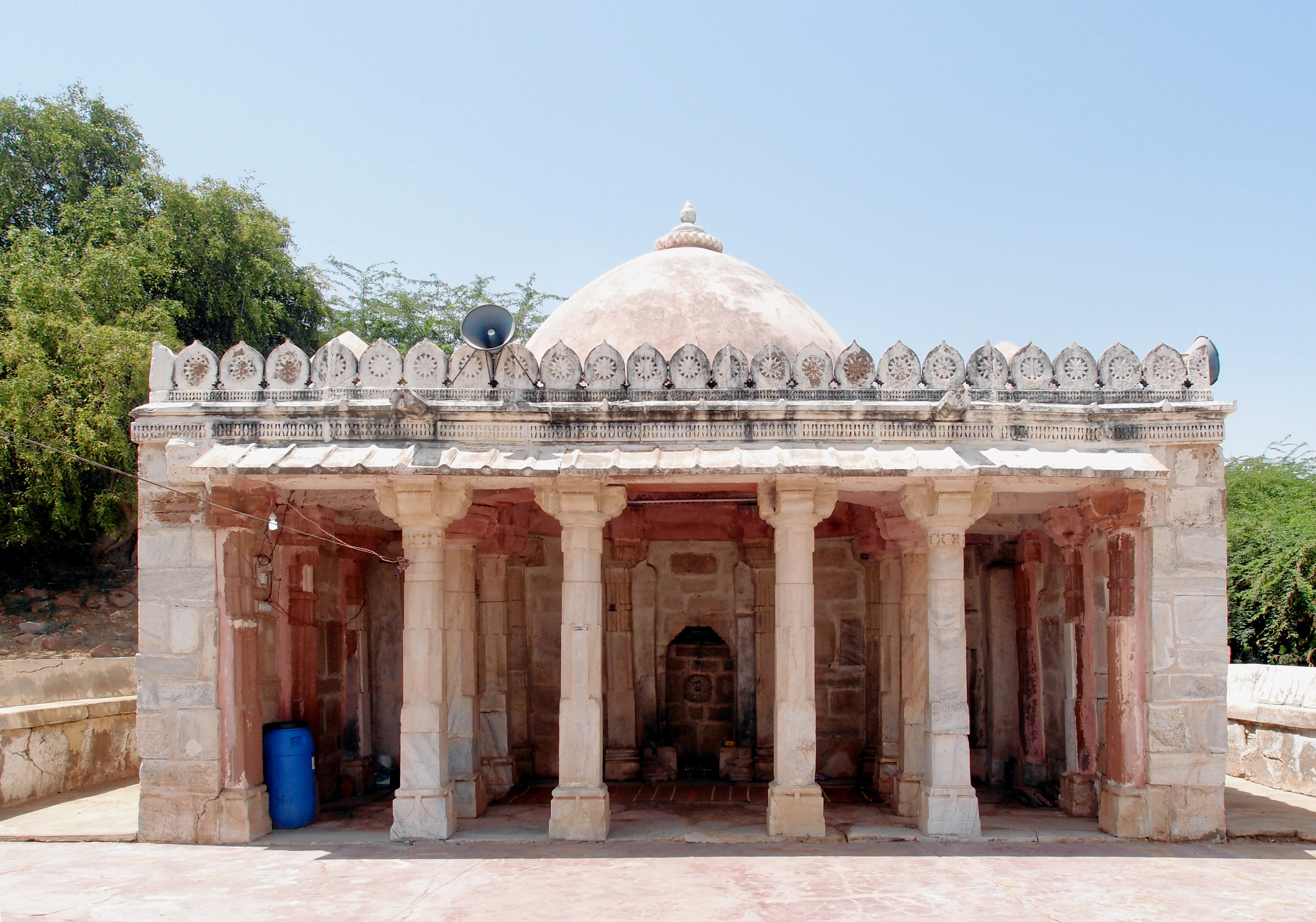
The Bhodesar Mosque was heavily influenced by Jain architectural styles.

The white marble mosque of Bhodesar is built in a style that was highly influenced by the architecture of nearby Jain temples. The mosque was built in 1505 CE by the Sultan Mahmud Begada of Gujarat. The mosque features a central dome very similar to domes found on the nearby Jain temples, resting upon a square shaped edifice measuring 9.2 metres on each side. Pillars at the mosque also reflect Jain architecture, while decorative elements along the roofline were also inspired by Jain temples.

== Conservation ==
The temples and mosques are protected by the Antiquities Act 1968, which was replaced by the Antiquities Act 1975. The site is managed by Director General of Archaeology and Museums. The Endowment Fund Trust for Preservation of the Heritage of Sindh, established in 2008, has undertaken restoration works at the site using private funding. The landscape was submitted by the Pakistani government in 2016 to be inscribed on the tentative list of UNESCO World Heritage Site status in 2016.

== Gallery ==
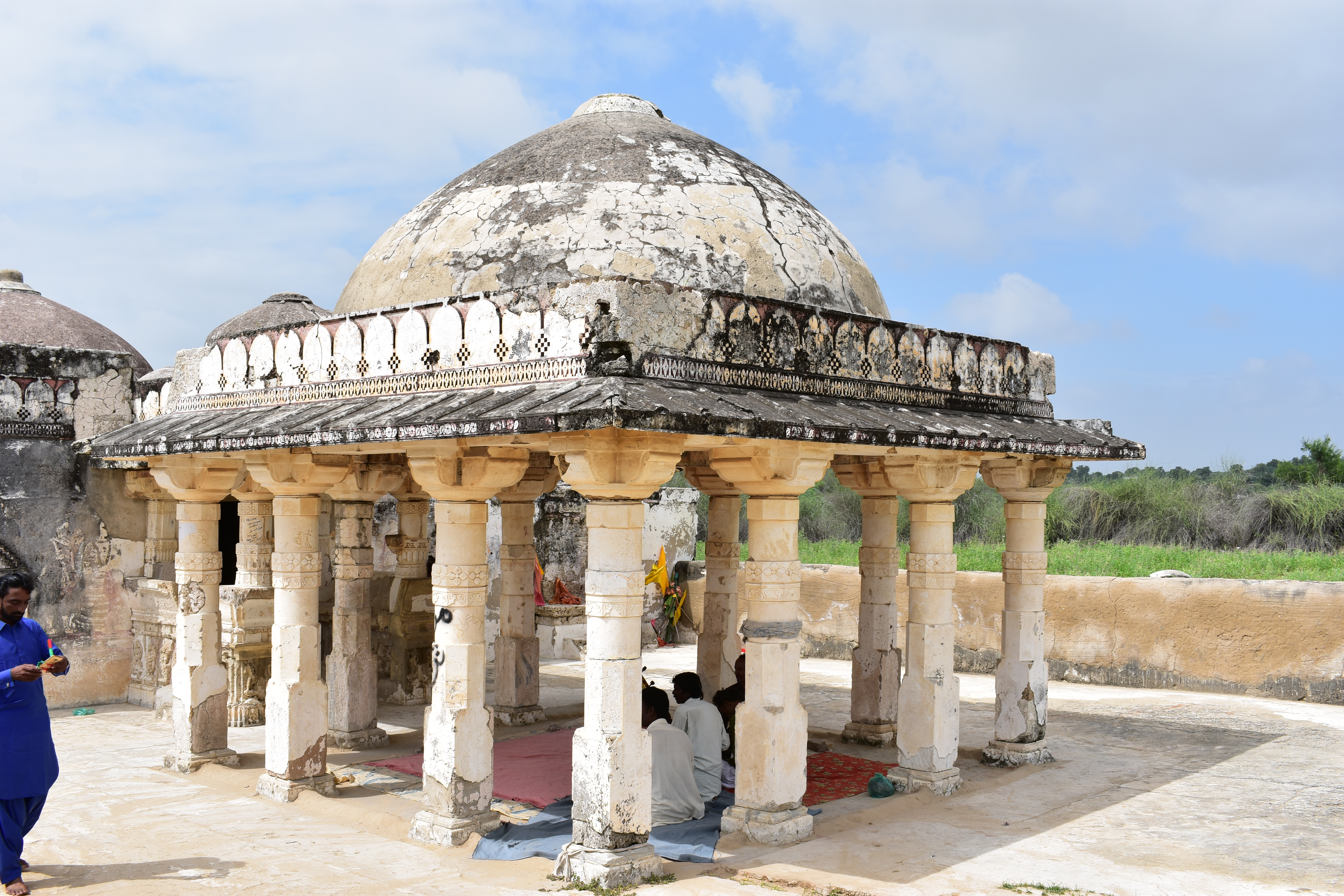
Gori temple

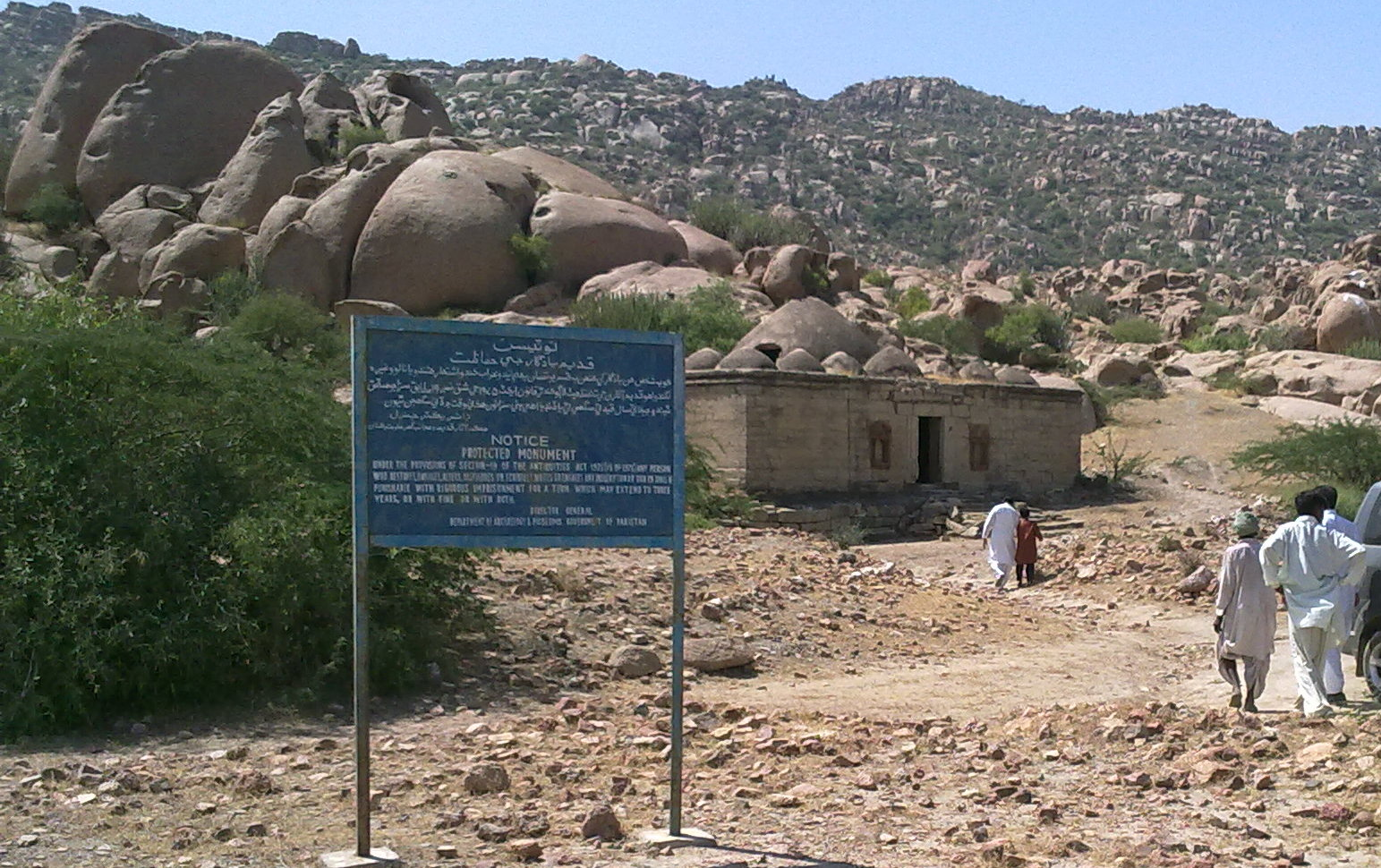
Jain Temple at Karoonjhar Mountains

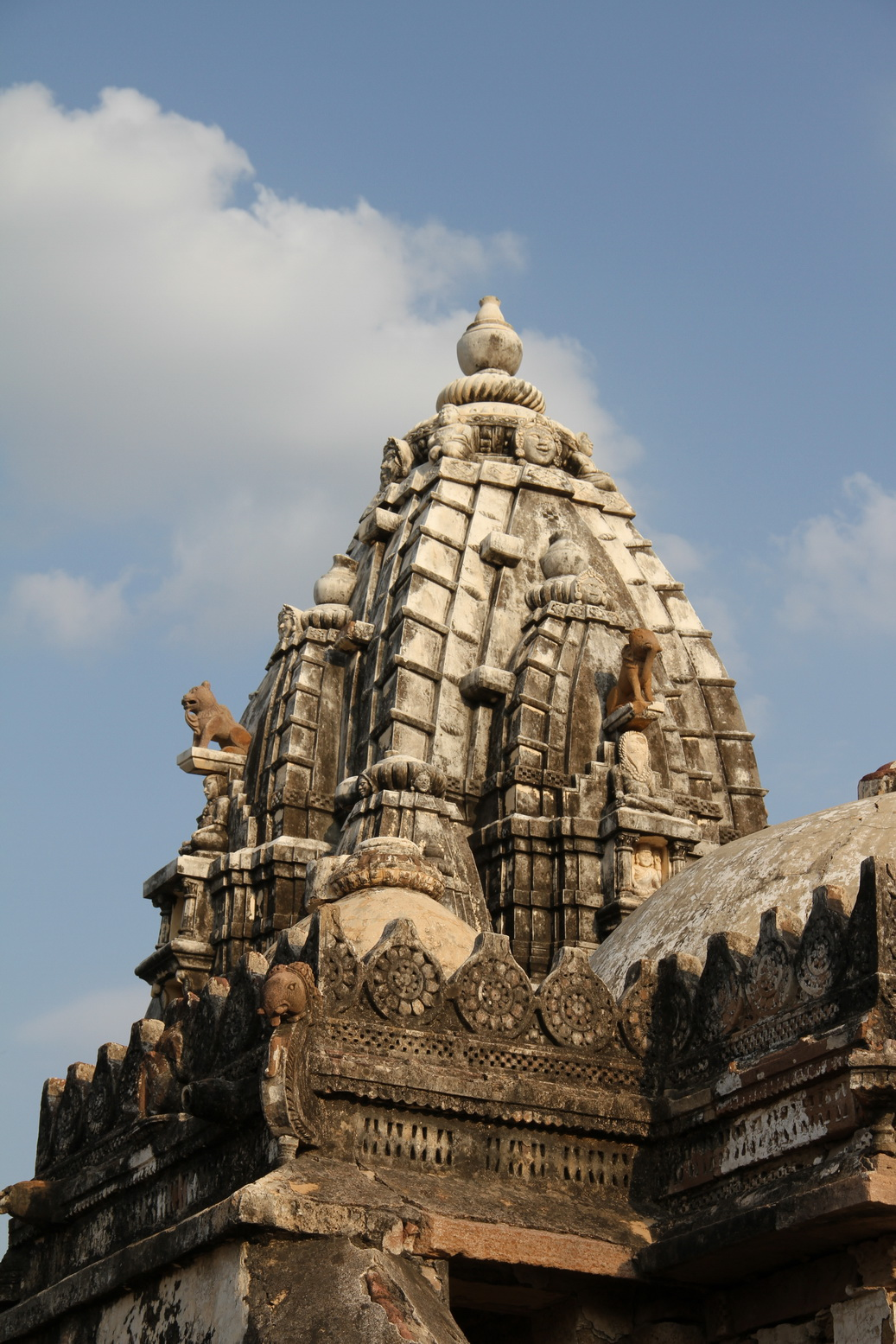
Shikhar of Nagarparkar Bazaar Temple

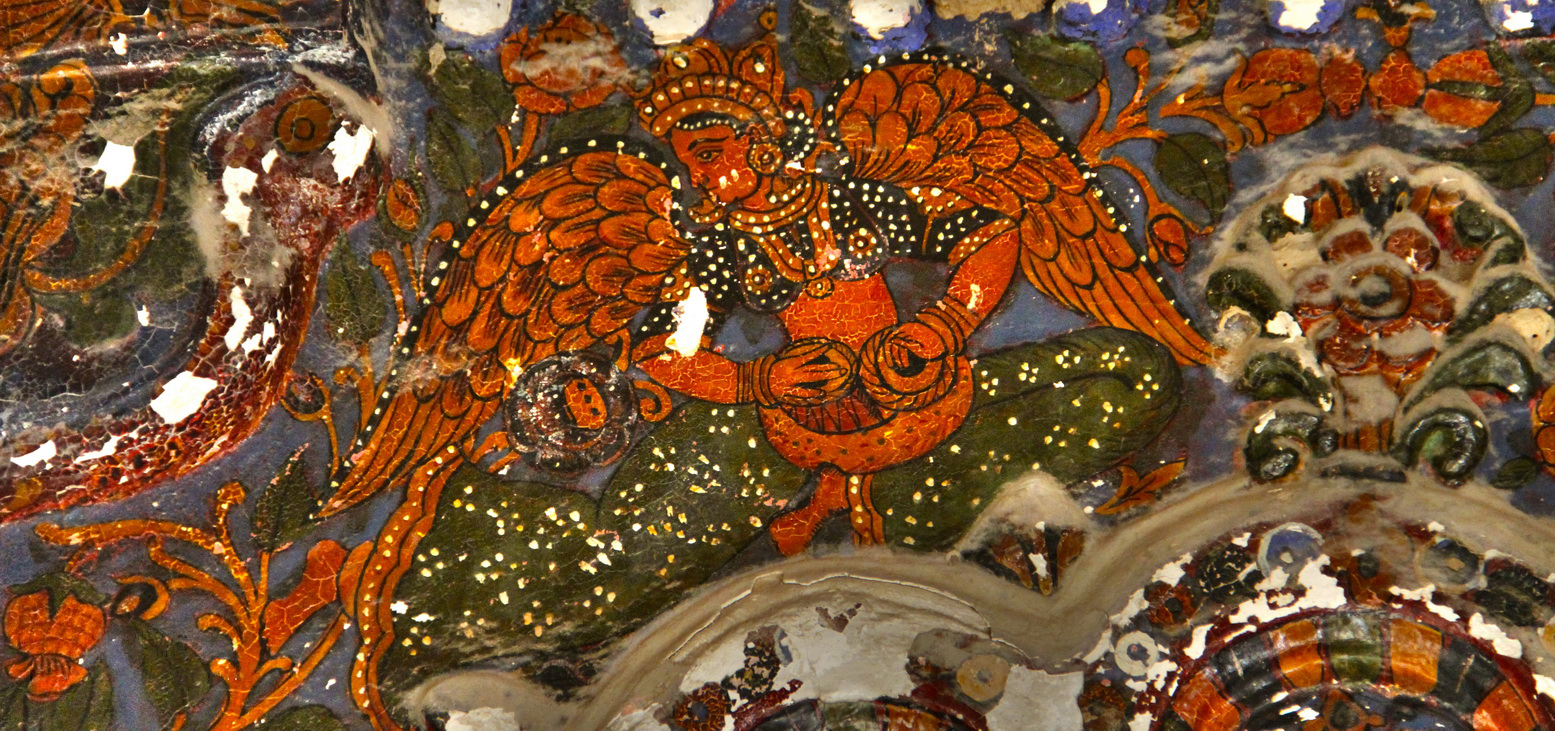
Paintings at the Bazaar Temple

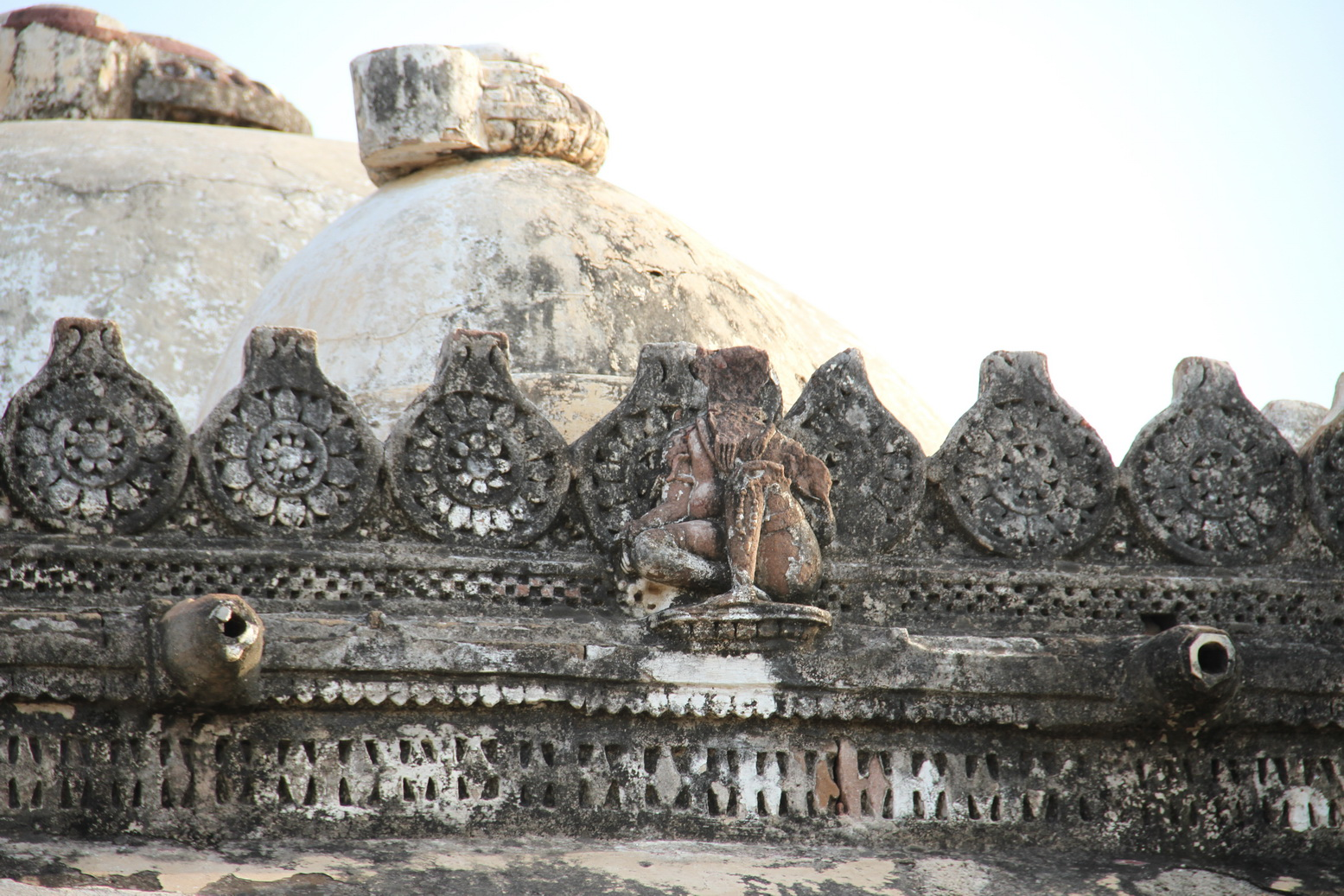
Architectural details at Nagarparkar Jain Temples

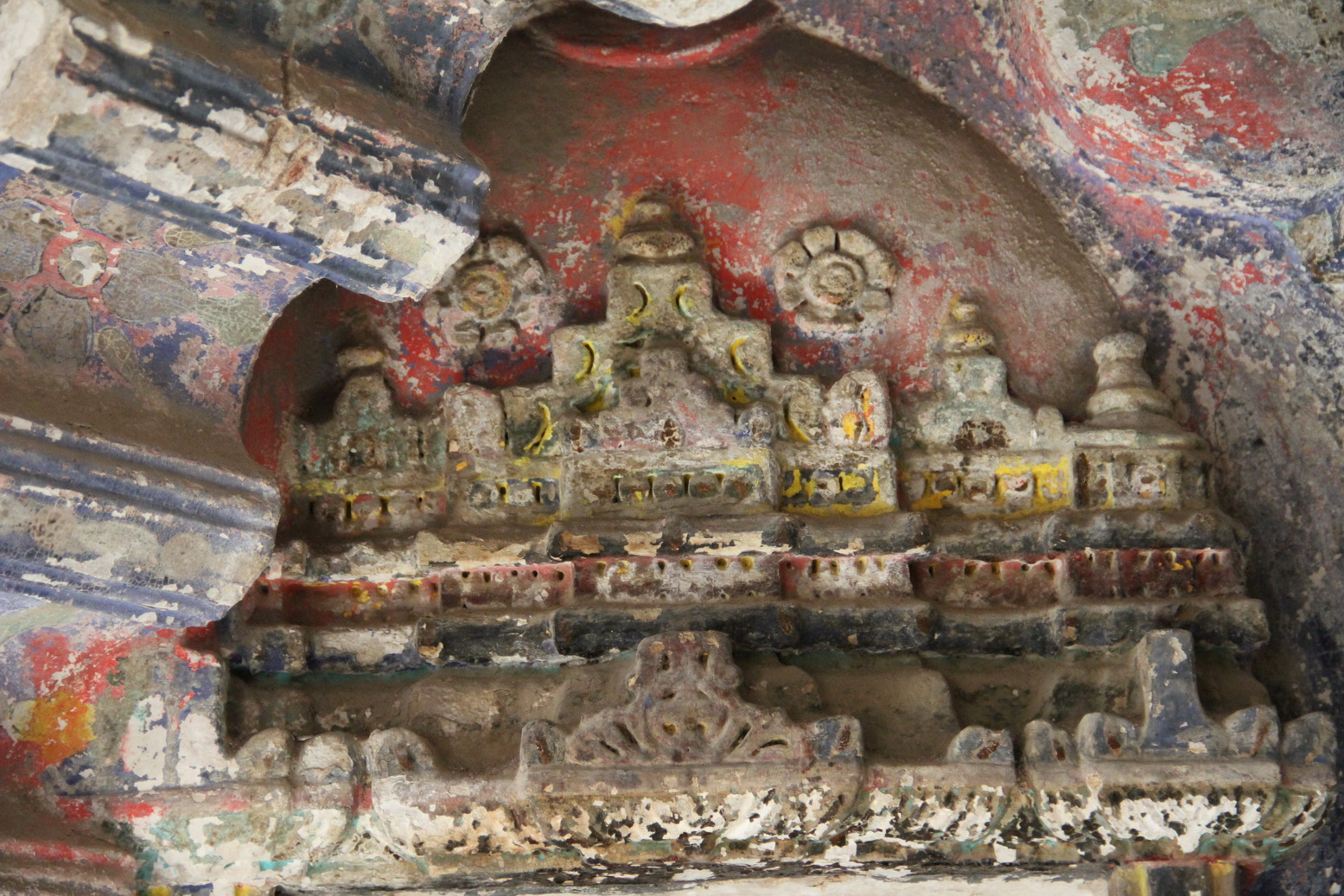
Wall carving of Nagarparkar Bazaar Temple

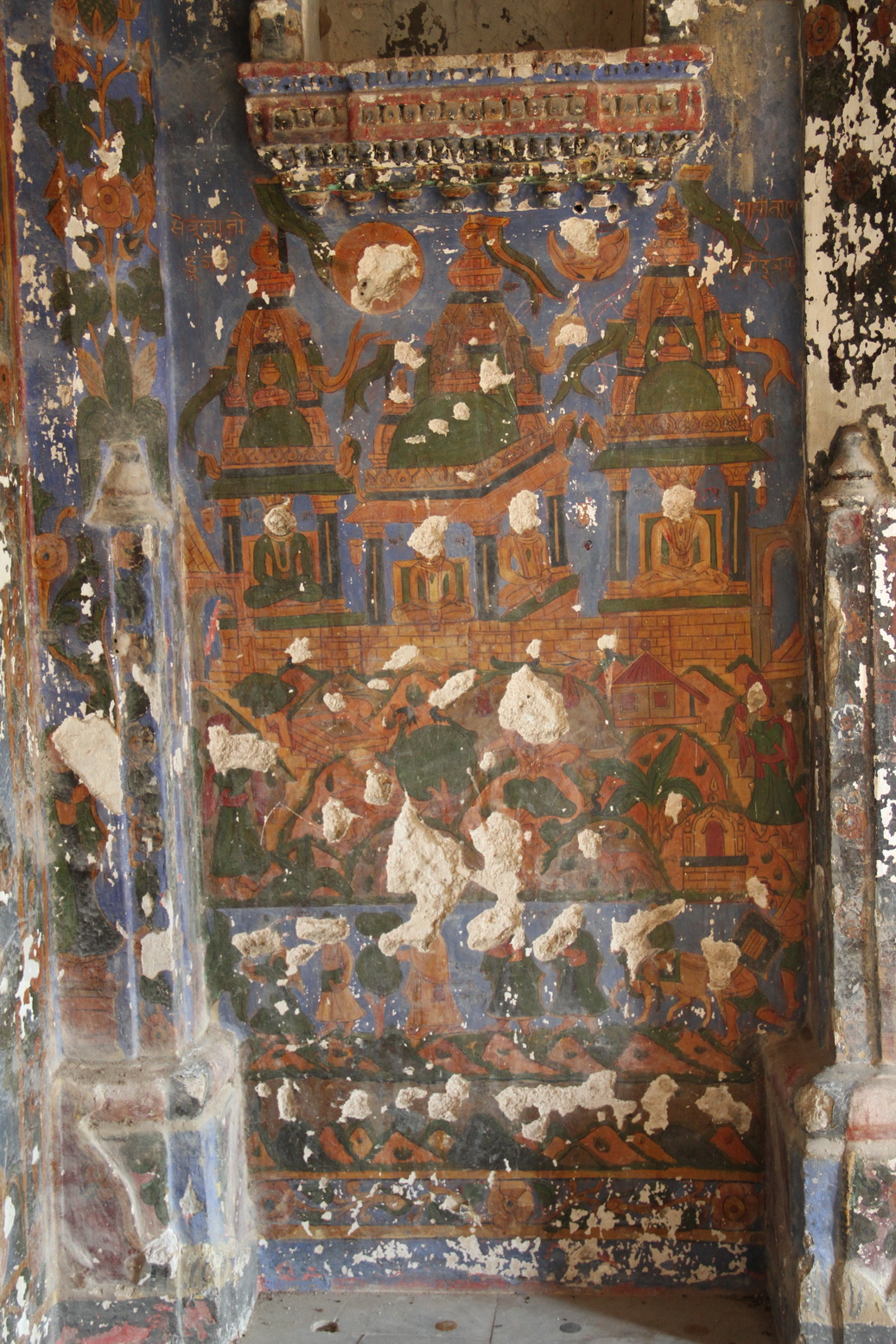
Painting of Tirthankaras at the Bazaar Temple

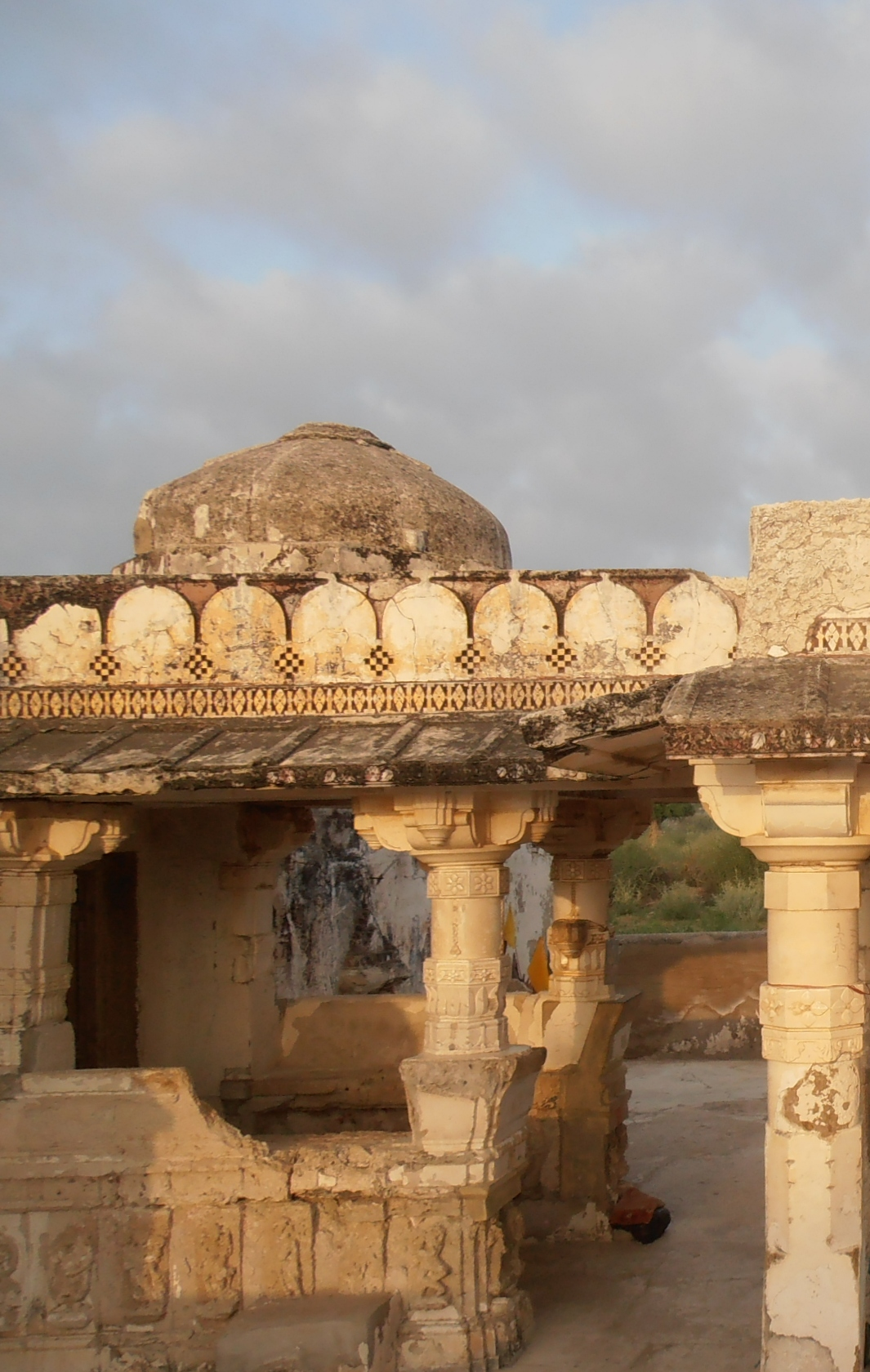
Entry to the Godi Temple

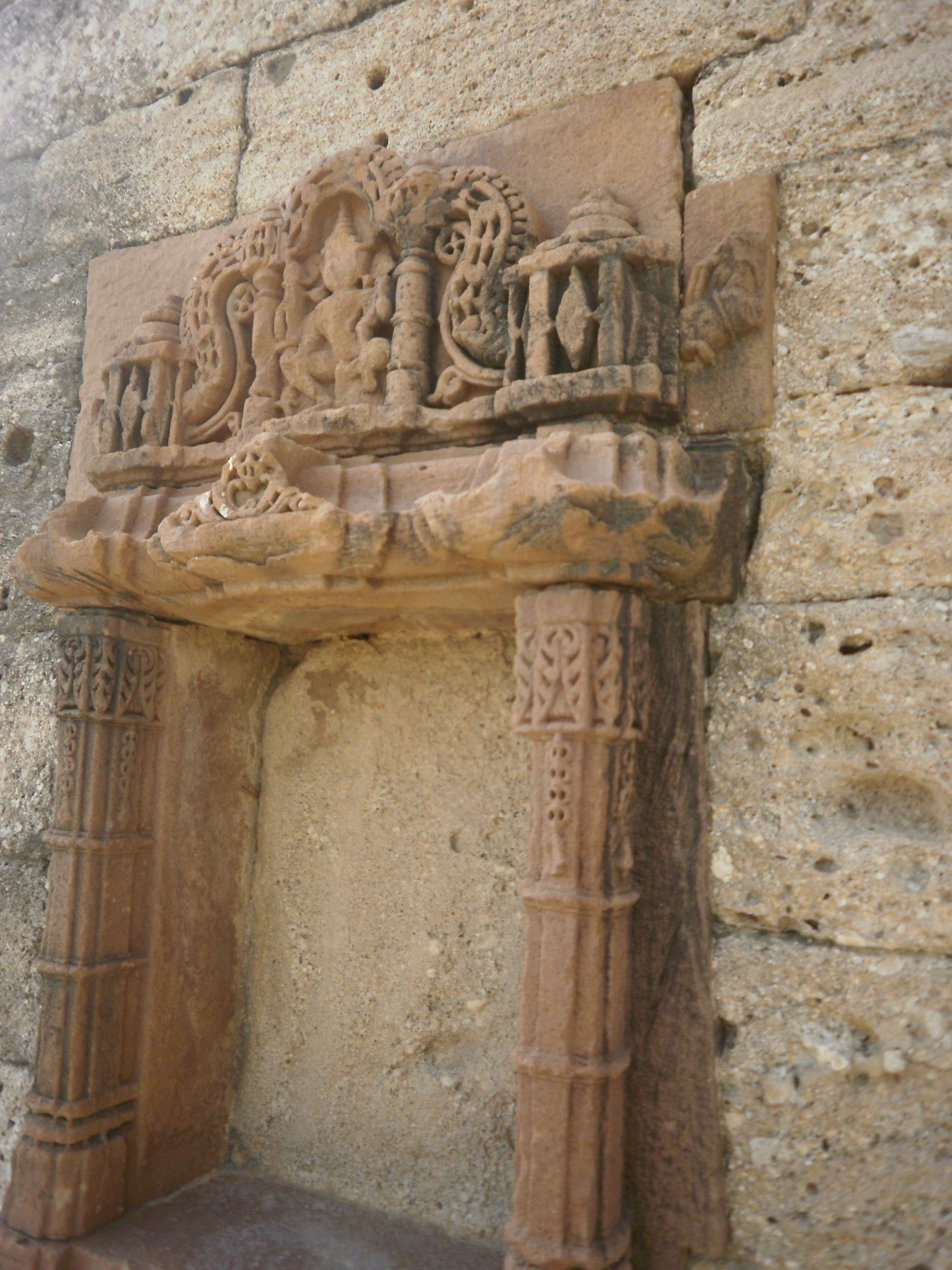
Intricate stonework at Godi Temple

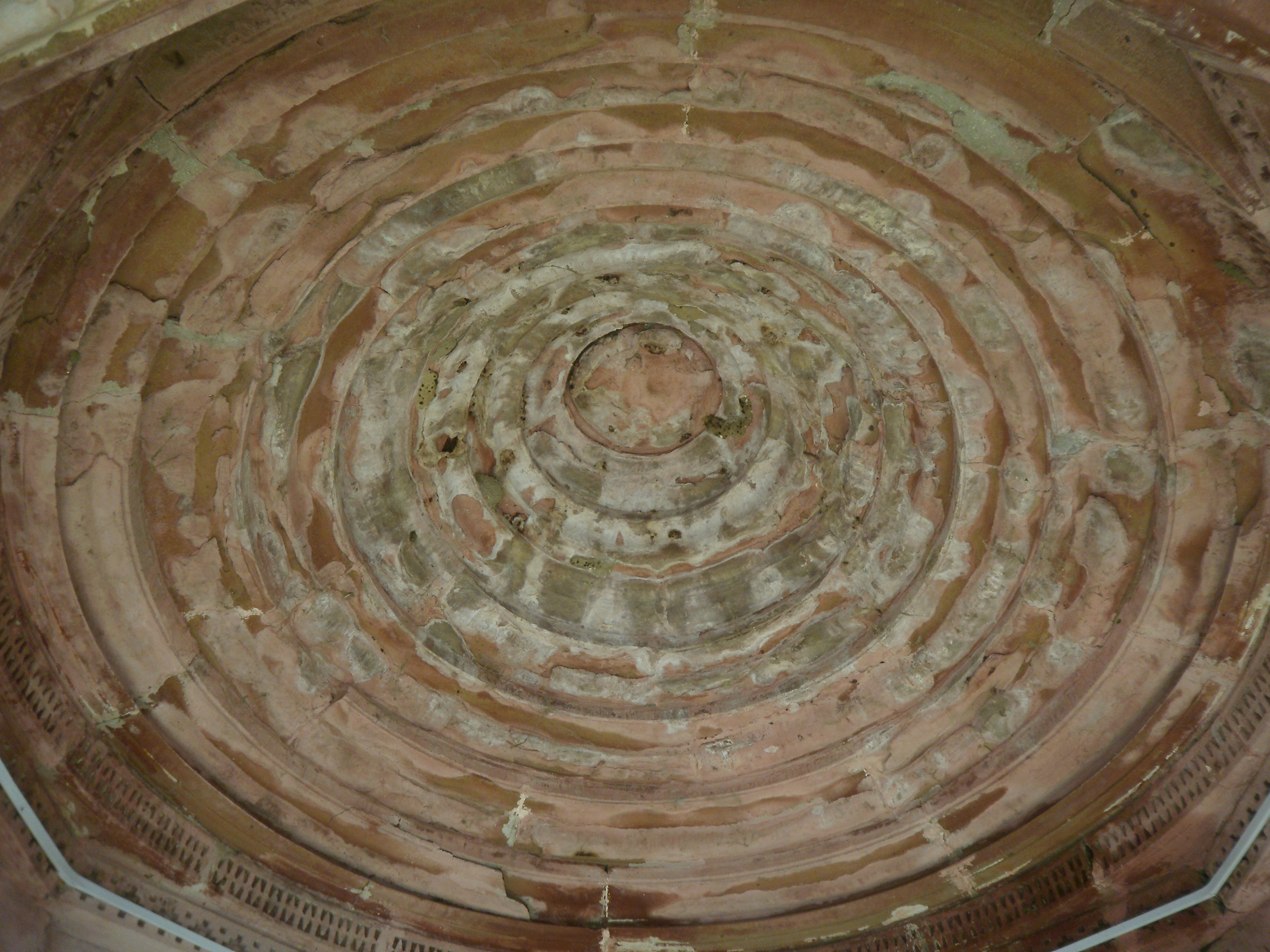
The dome at the Bhodesar Mosque is similar to those found in nearby Jain temples.

== See also ==
- Jainism in Pakistan
- Rohtas Fort
- Tilla Jogian
- Katas Raj Temples
- Churrio Jabal Durga Mata Temple
- Parbrahm Ashram
- List of World Heritage Sites in Pakistan
