= Rooplo Kolhi =

Freedom fighter

Girasia of Chandangarh Rooplo Shamtoji Kolhi
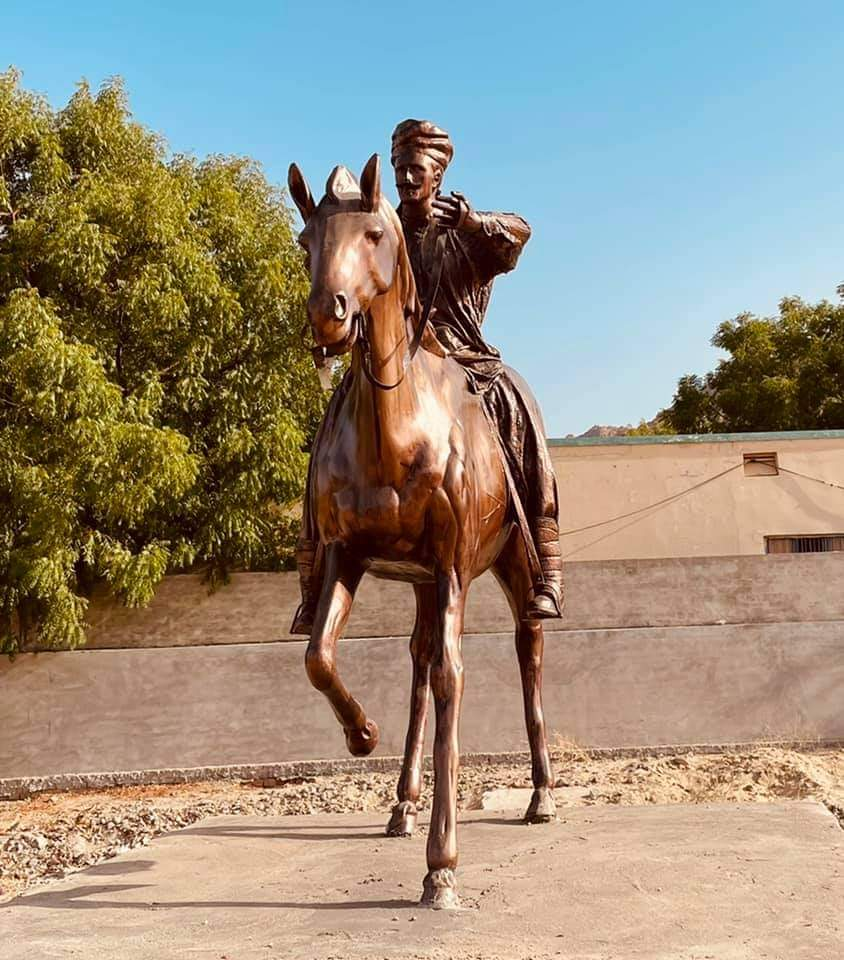
- Statue of Amar Shaheed Rooplo Kolhi in Nagarparkar, Sindh, Pakistan.
- Born: Rupaji Gohil; 1818; Konbhari village, Nagarparkar, Sindh, British India
- Died: 22 August 1858; Gardharo River near Nagarparkar and Karoonjhar Mountains
- Cause of death: Hanged By British Government
- Monuments: Nagarparkar, Sindh, Pakistan
- Other names: Ruplo Kolhi; Rupaji Gohil; Roopajee Gohel
- Occupation: Girasia of Chandangarh
- Era: British era
- Criminal charges: Murder; Looting & plundering
- Spouse: Meenawati Rooplo Kolhi
- Children: Krishna Kohli (grand daughter); Veerji Kolhi (grandson)
- Mother: Kesarbai Kolhi

Rooplo Shamtoji Kolhi fought against the British Rulers in Karoonjhar Mountains at Nagarparkar of District Tharparkar, Sindh. His birth name was Rupaji Gohil. The British hanged him on 22 August 1858 with his companions. His anniversary is celebrated on August 22 every year by a faction of Jeay Sindh Qaumi Mahaz. He was the last commander of rebels hanged by the British officials.

== History ==
Rooplo Kolhi was a commander of Koli forces and he, along with two other commanders were rebelling under Rana Karan Singh Sodha of Nagarparkar. Under Kolhi's leadership, more than 8,000 fighters belonging to Kolhi tribe rebelled. The rebel army under the leadership of Rooplo had already defeated the army of Col George Tyrwhitt thrice in Karoonjhar Mountains by then. After each encounter, Tyrwhitt returned to his army base camp situated in Mirpurkhas with a worn-out cavalry. When he attacked the Parkar region of Sindh the second time, the Kolhi killed many of his British soldiers using guerilla war tactics. Other commanders were killed and later Rooplo Kolhi was arrested near Pag Wool well, where his troops were fetching water. Rooplo Kolhi was brought before Colonel Tyrwhitt, who offered him a large sum of wealth with a condition that Kolhi should seek an apology and become a vassal and inform the hideout of Karan Singh and his companions, to which Kolhi opposed. His fingers were wrapped in cotton and soaked in oil was burnt in front of locals. He sustained all the tortures bravely. He was hanged on the banks of Gardharo stream, near Nagarparkar and Karunjher Mountains on 22 August 1858.

== Descendants ==
After the death of Kolhi, his mother Kesrbai, wife Meenawati and others migrated to Kunri, which is a part of today's Umerkot district and his later descendants settled at the place.

== Tribute ==
- In 2017, a resort under his name Rooplo Kolhi Resort was opened in Nagarparkar, Sindh by the Sindh Tourism Development Corporation.
- In October 2022, a book was published by Chief Minister of Sindh about Rooplo Kolhi.
- In schools of Sindh, the history of Rooplo Kolhi is studied in Higher Education syllabus.
- The civil society organisations of Pakistan demanded that Karoonjhar Mountains be declared a world heritage site because the mountain is the identity of Shaheed Rooplo Kolhi who fought the British army and was hanged there.

== See also ==
- List of Koli people
- List of Koli states and clans
- Jhalkari Bai
- Tanaji Malusare
