= Krishna Kohli =

Pakistani politician

Senator Krishna Kohli
- ڪرشنا ڪوهلي
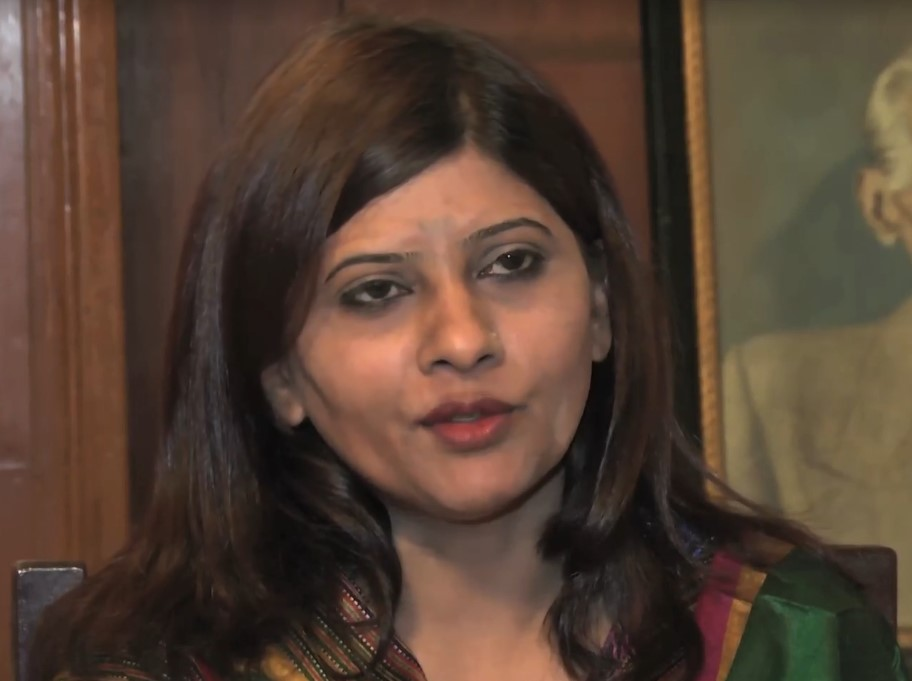

Member of the Senate of Pakistan
- Incumbent
- Assumed office 12 March 2018

Personal details
- Born: 1 February 1979 (age 47) Nagarparkar, Sindh, Pakistan
- Party: Pakistan Peoples Party
- Relations: Veerji Kolhi (brother), Rooplo Kolhi (great grandfather)
- Education: University of Sindh
- Nickname: Kishoo Bai

Krishna Kumari Kohli (Sindhi: ڪرشنا ڪماري ڪوھلي, Urdu: کرشنا کماری کوہلی; born 1 February 1979), also known by the nickname Kishoo Bai, is a Pakistani politician who has been the member of the Senate of Pakistan from March 2018 to March 2024. She is the second Hindu woman to hold this position. She is known for her campaigns for women's rights and against bonded labour; and was named as one of the BBC's 100 most influential women in 2018.

== Early life and education ==
Kolhi was born on 1 February 1979 to a poor Koli family hailing from a village in Nagarparkar. When she was a child and a student of grade three, she and her family were held captive for three years as bonded labourers in a private jail allegedly owned by a landlord in Umerkot District. They were only released after a police raid on their employer's land. She received her early education initially from Umerkot district and then from Mirpurkhas District.

She got married at the age of 16 in 1994 while she was studying in grade nine. She continued her education after her marriage and in 2013 earned a master's degree in sociology from the University of Sindh.

In 2007, she attended the third Mehergarh Human Rights Youth Leadership Training Camp in Islamabad in which she studied the government of Pakistan, international migration, strategic planning and learned about the tools that could be used to create social change.

== Political career ==
Kolhi joined the Pakistan Peoples Party (PPP) as a social activist to campaign for the rights of marginalised communities in the Thar region. She also campaigns for women's rights, against bonded labour, and against sexual harassment in the workplace. In 2018, she was elected to the Senate of Pakistan in the Pakistan Senate elections as a PPP candidate on a reserved seat for women from Sindh. She took oath as Senator on 12 March 2018. She was the second Hindu woman elected to the Senate after Ratna Bhagwandas Chawla.

In 2018, BBC named her one of the BBC's 100 most influential women. In 2019, on the Women's day, she served as the chair of the Senate for one day.

Following the 2020 Karak temple attack a new bill "Protection of the Rights of Religious Minorities Bill" was introduced in the Senate of Pakistan to avoid similar attack on minority worship places. But it was turned down by the Senate Standing Committee headed by Jamiat Ulema-e-Islam (F) (JUI-F) senator Abdul Ghafoor Haideri. Krishna Kumari Kolhi walked out of the Senate during the meeting as a form of protest.

== See also ==
- Veeru Kohli
- List of Koli people
- List of Koli states and clans
