= Sardharo Temple =

Hindu temple in Sindh, Pakistan

Sardharo Shiv temple
- شِو مندِر
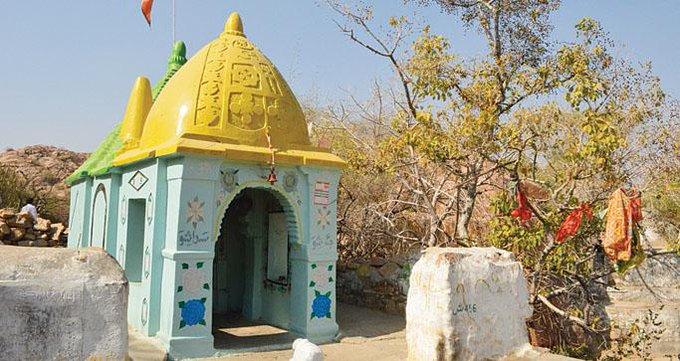
- Sardharo Shiv temple or Sardharo Dham

Religion
- Affiliation: Hinduism
- District: Tharparkar
- Deity: Shiva
- Festival: Shivaratri

Location
- State: Sindh
- Country: Pakistan
- Interactive map of Sardharo Shiv temple
- Coordinates: 24°20′30″N 70°44′26″E

Architecture
- Type: Hindu temple
- Temple: 1

Sardharo Shiv temple (Urdu: سردھارو شیو مندر), also known as Sardharo Dham, is a Hindu temple situated in the Karoonjhar Mountains, in the Tharparkar district in the Sindh Province of Pakistan. It is a complex comprising four Hindu temples, a samadhi and a pond.

== History ==
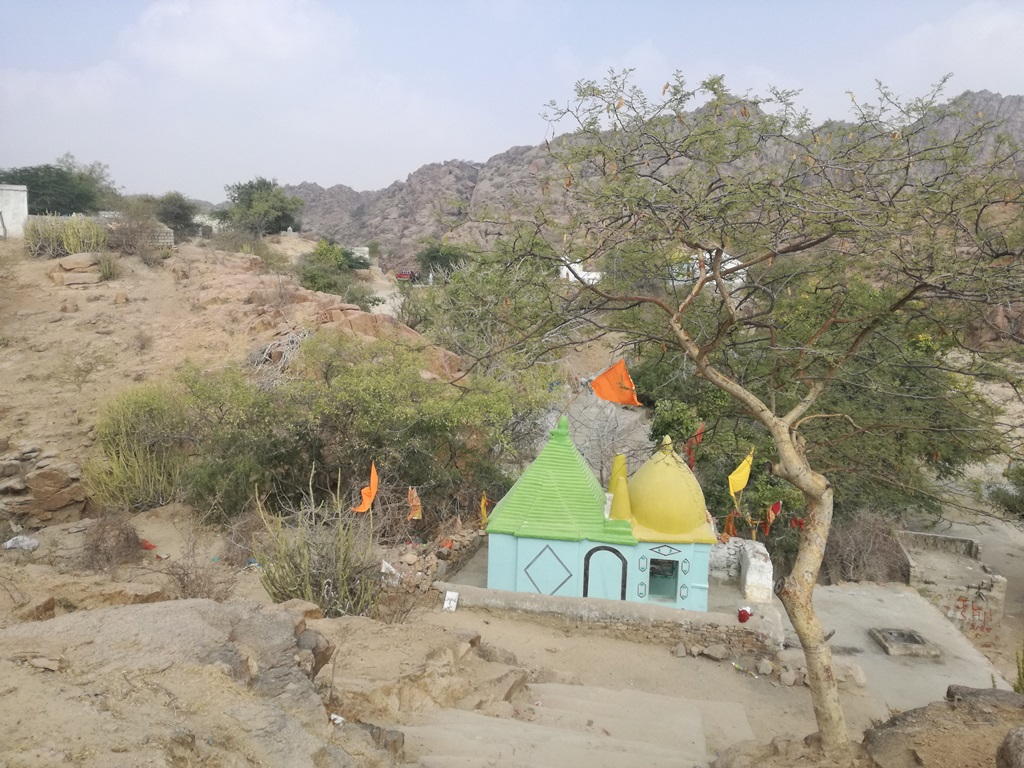
Sardharo temple in Karoonjhar Mountains

According to the legend, Lord Shiva once stayed at the site and a tributary of River Ganga, who resides in his hair, once fell in the pond. Its also believed that a tributary of the Ganga once flowed into the temple pond.

Another legendis that, Thar Desert was once a sea, where the Hindu deity Rishi Parasara chose to perform a prolonged period of worship that spanned hundreds of years, seeking eternal enlightenment. However, Rishi Parasara lost his invocation as he committed a grave sin by engaging in sex with his daughter, which led to the sea drying up. The Sardharo River, named after the Hindu sadhus who bathed in its waters, was believed to be a permanent river, but it too dried up over time, with the local Hindus attributing this phenomenon to the accumulation of human sins.

Another legend associated with the temple is that, the site where the temple now stands was once a dense forest with deer. One day, a female deer became entangled in a Googral tree, remaining stuck for days until its eventual death. In its next life, it was reborn as a blind lady in the Royal family of Gujarat. Despite her family's efforts to cure her illness, she remained unwell until she caught the scent of moong from Barooriya village, a place she had once gazed upon as a deer. It was then that she revealed the only way to restore her health: to bury her skull, still stuck in the Googral tree, in the pond at the Shiva temple in Sardharo. The Googral tree still stands near the temple.

== Significance ==
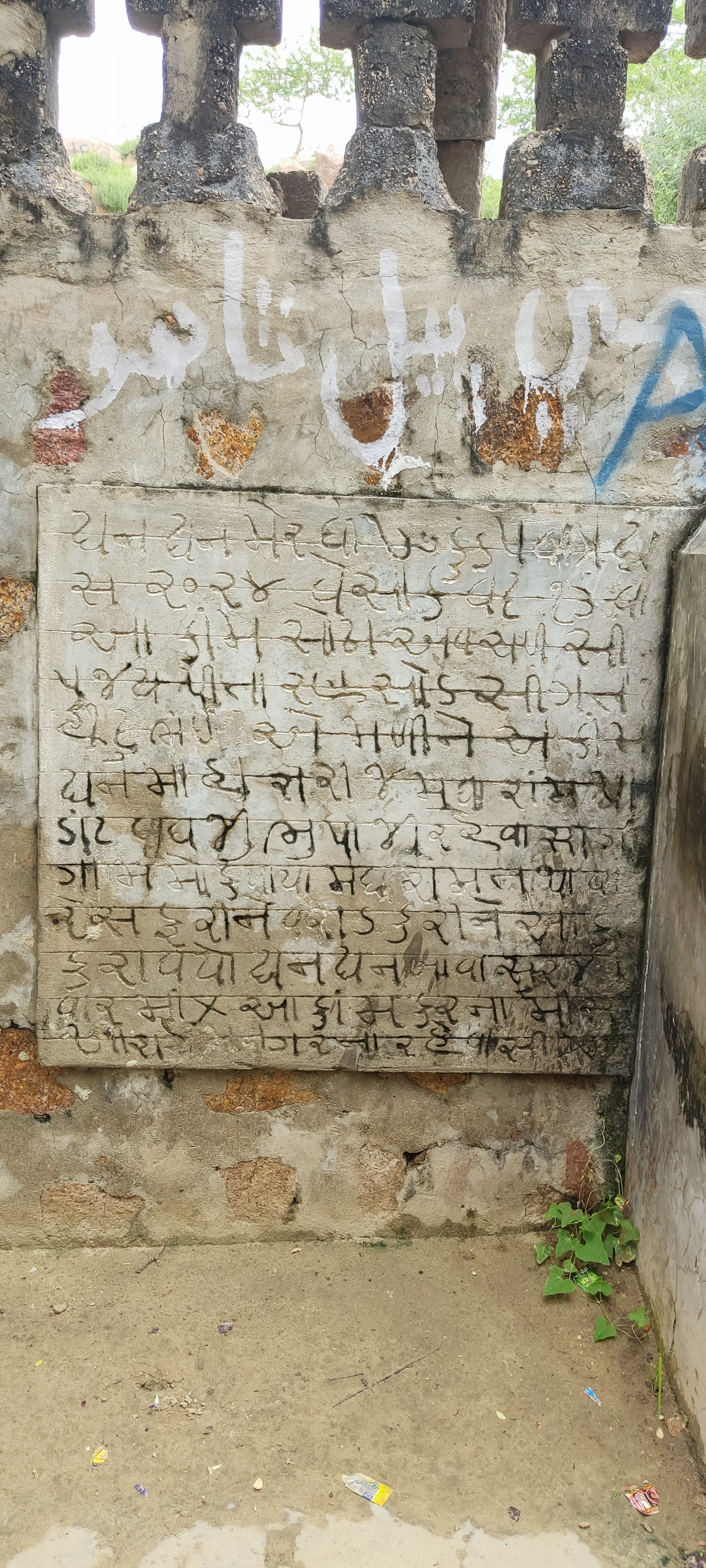
Old Parkari language written on the temple walls

The temple has one of the two springs in the Karoonjhar mountains, the other is in the Achelswar temple.

The shrine's main festival is the annual fair known as Shiv Ka Mela, that happens in the month of February. Another fair happens annually in the 15th of October on full moon day.

== See also ==
- Hinduism in Pakistan
- Shiv temple, Hyderabad
- Shri Hinglaj Mata temple
