= Nagarparkar Tehsil =

Pakistani administrative area

Nagarparkar نگرپاركر
- Tehsil
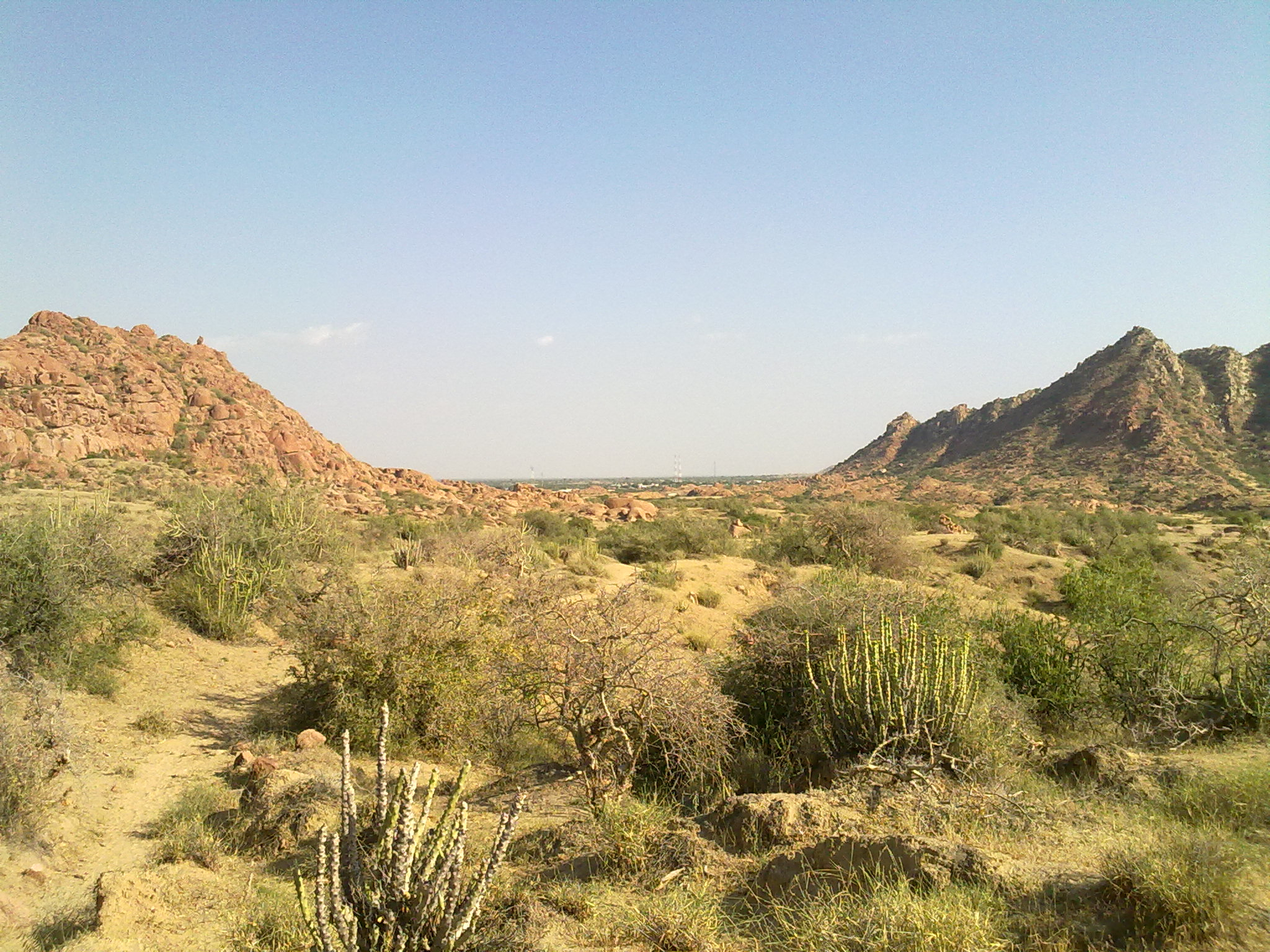
- View of Nagarparkar from the Karoonjhar Mountains

- Coordinates: 24°21′21″N 70°45′16″E
- Country: Pakistan
- Province: Sindh
- District: Tharparkar

Area
  - Total: 3,862 km^{2} (1,491 sq mi)

Population (2017)
  - Total: 259,880
  - Density: 67.29/km^{2} (174.3/sq mi)
- Time zone: UTC+5 (PST)

Nagarparkar (Urdu: نگرپاركر, Sindhi: ننگرپارڪر) is a tehsil at the base of the Karoonjhar Mountains in Tharparkar District in Sindh province of Pakistan. The historic Churrio Jabal Durga Mata Temple is situated here. The taluka is located at a distance of 129 km from Mithi, in Sindh, Pakistan. It is the eastern-most part of Sindh.

== Description ==
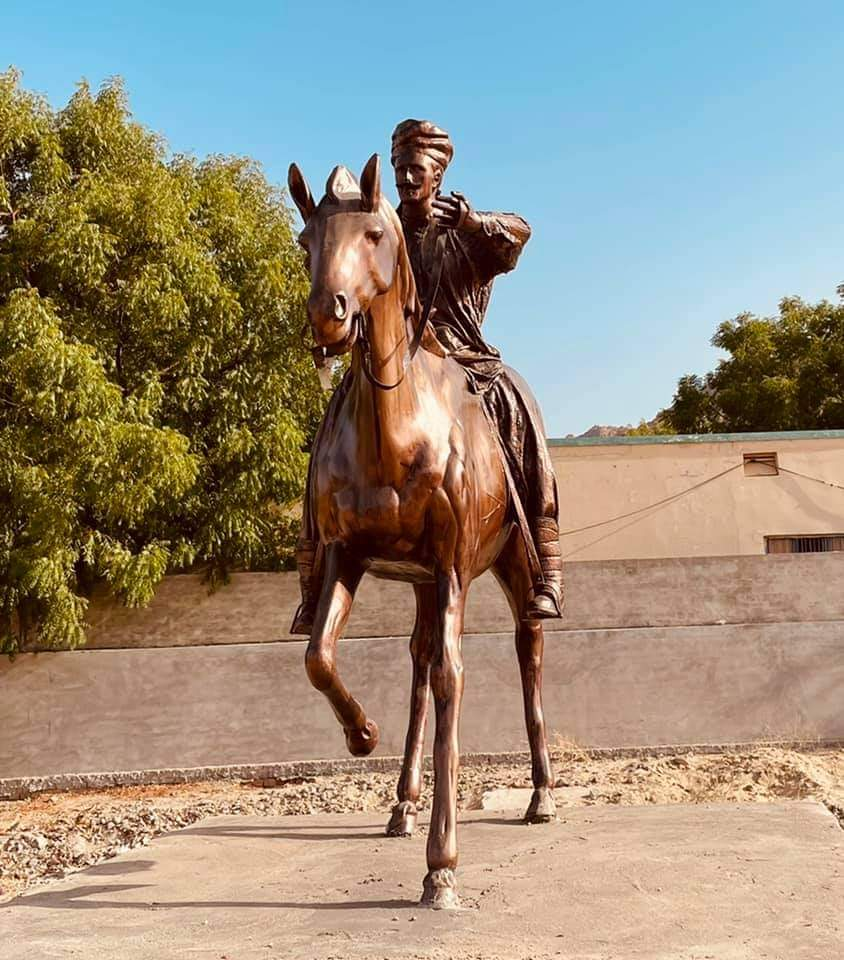
Statue of Rooplo Kolhi

The name comes from the original word Nangar Parkar. It is at the foot of the Karoonjhar Hills. It is situated at a distance of about 16 km south and about 23 from east from the Indian border. At one time the area was under the sea, which had to be crossed; the name "Parkar" means "to cross over". Nagarparkar has Chachro taluk on its north, and on its west is Islamkot taluk, while on the east of it lies Barmer district of the Indian state of Rajasthan and on its south is Rann Kachchh and the Indian state of Gujarat. The surrounding area is a rocky belt called Parkar, and the remaining part is a sandy area.

The Karoonjhar hills cover 16 miles in the south of Nagarparkar taluk. The granite stone of this mountain is used for making tiles. There is a saying that the Karoonjhar hills provide 1-1/4 kilos of gold every day in the form of red granite stone, china clay, and honey. In summer, different sounds are audible from the rock due to sulfur deposits.

== Demographics ==
In 1998, the population of the taluka was 153,106, out of which 90,513 were Hindus and 62,213 Muslims.

Religions in Nagarparkar taluk (2017)
Religion	Percent
Hinduism	63.57%
Islam	36.20%
Other or not stated	0.23%

As of 2017 census Nagarparkar Taluk has a population of 259,880 and had a percent annual growth rate of 2.82% over the period of 1998-2017. 11,801 (4.54%) live in urban areas. The sex ratio was 901 females per 1000 males and the literacy rate for people 10 years and above was 24.17%, the lowest in all taluks of Tharparkar district. Hindus were 165,204 while Muslims were 94,065.

Nagarparkar is located at a unique position at the intersection of three major languages: Sindhi, Marwari and Gujarati. Although 97.78% of the population recorded their mother tongue as Sindhi and 1.62% as 'Other', most people speak a blend of all three languages. Some of these varieties are Parkari Koli, Wadiyara Koli, and Kachi Koli.

== Culture ==
=== Nagarparkar Jain temples ===
The region once had a significant Jain population. Shri Gaudi Parshvanth Stavan in 1650 described the Parkar as the most glorious of all regions of India.

The remains of a number of Jain temples are popular tourist attractions and heritage sites in the region.

=== Churrio Jabal Durga Mata Temple ===
Churrio Jabal Durga Mata Temple in Choryo village, is one of the major Hindu temple in the region. The Shivratri celebration here is attended by 200,000 pilgrims. Hindus cremate the dead and ashes are preserved till Shivratri for immersion in the into holy water. This area has been leased by the government for the mining by dynamite blasting of the hills on which the temples are located. This is posing a threat to the temples. Angry pilgrims held a protest against mining.

There is one rest house beneath the Karoonjhar Mountain, but it partially collapsed during the 2001 Gujarat earthquake. This region is now a significant place of worship for the minority Hindu community due to the temple being located there. Sardharo Shiv temple, Anchlesar, and Jain temples are situated there.

== Gallery ==
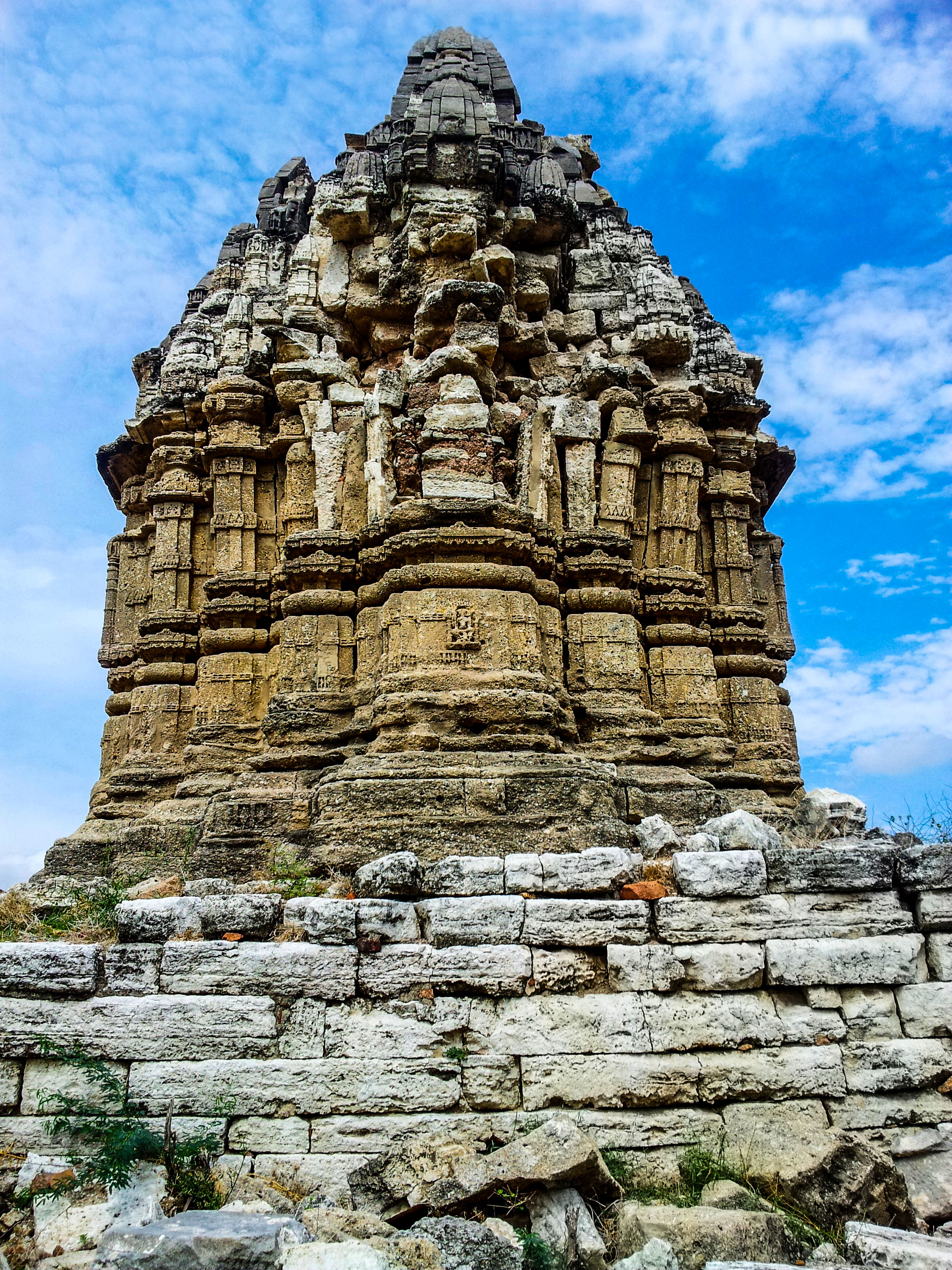
Jain Temple of Bhodesar

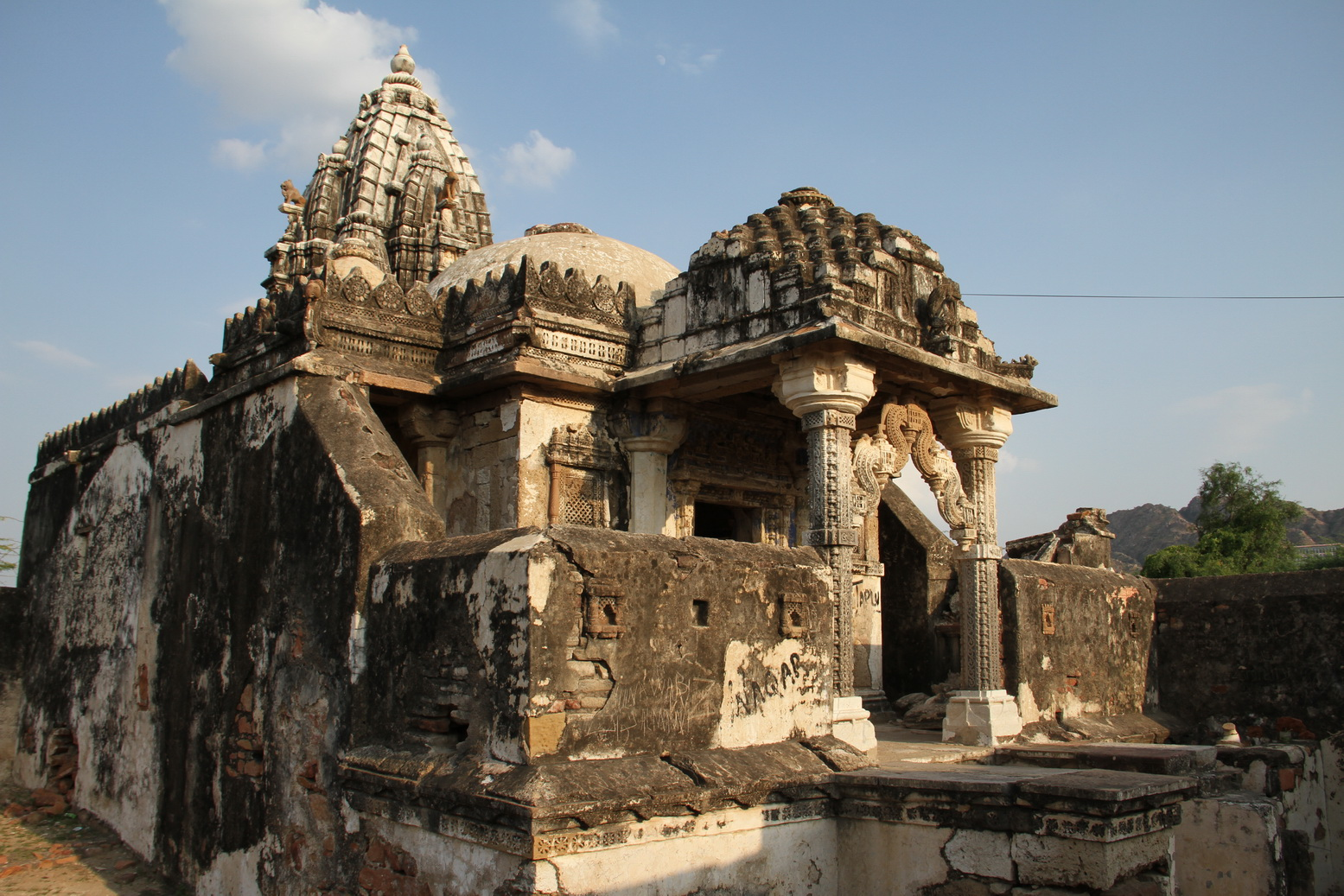
An ancient Jain temple at Nagarparkar

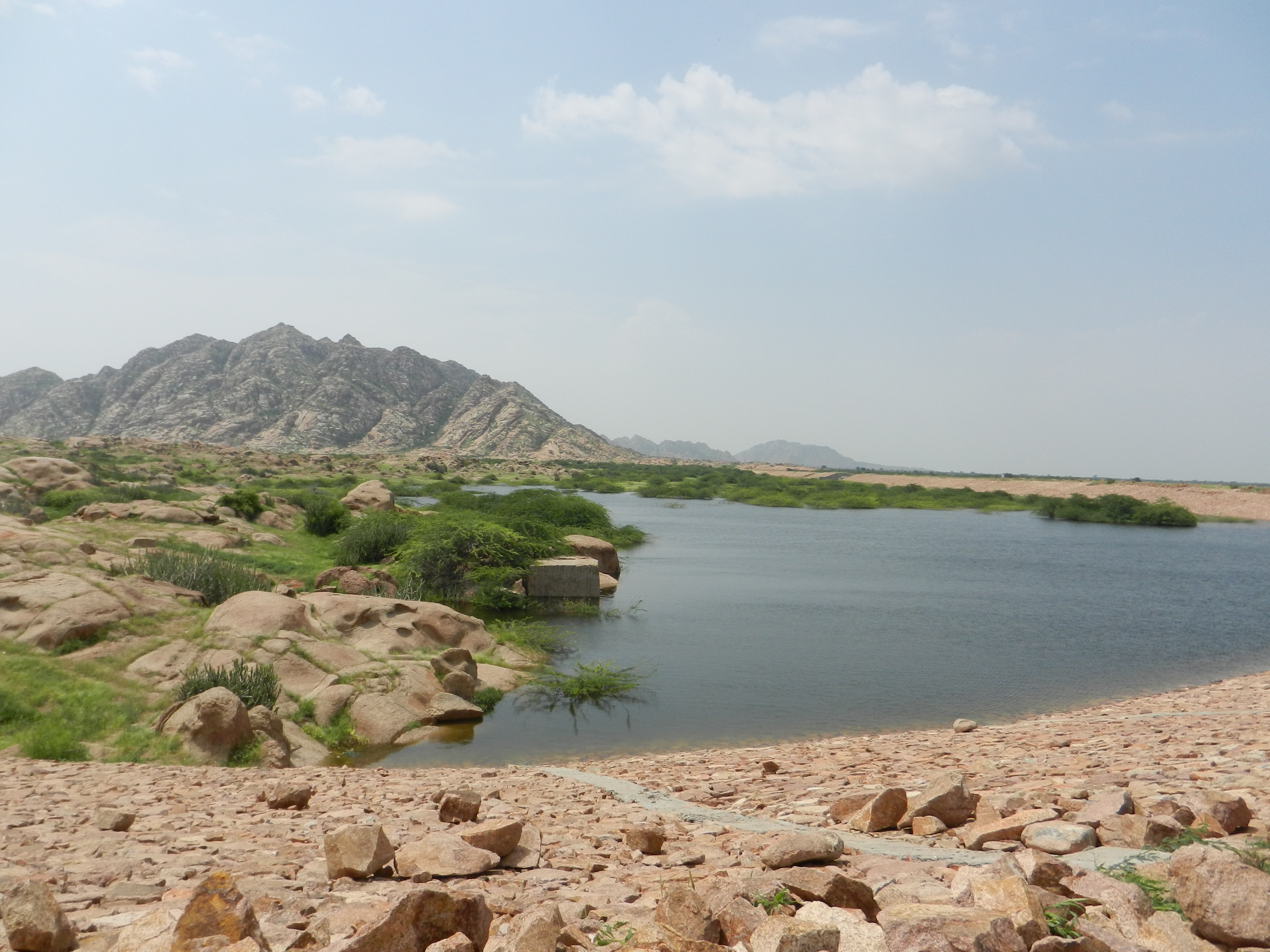

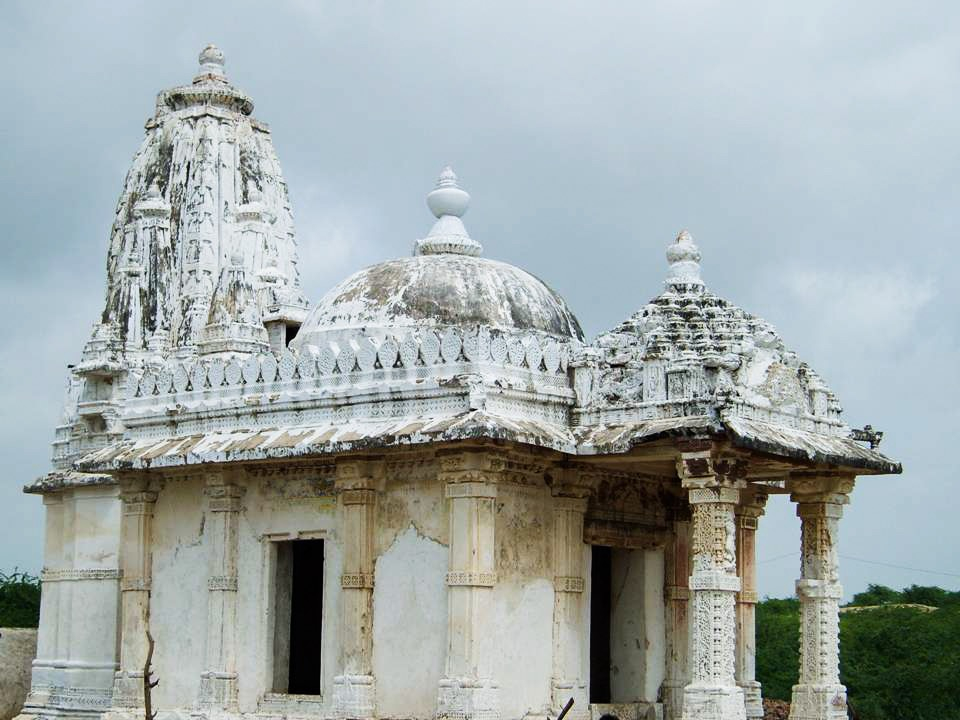
Virawah Jain Temple

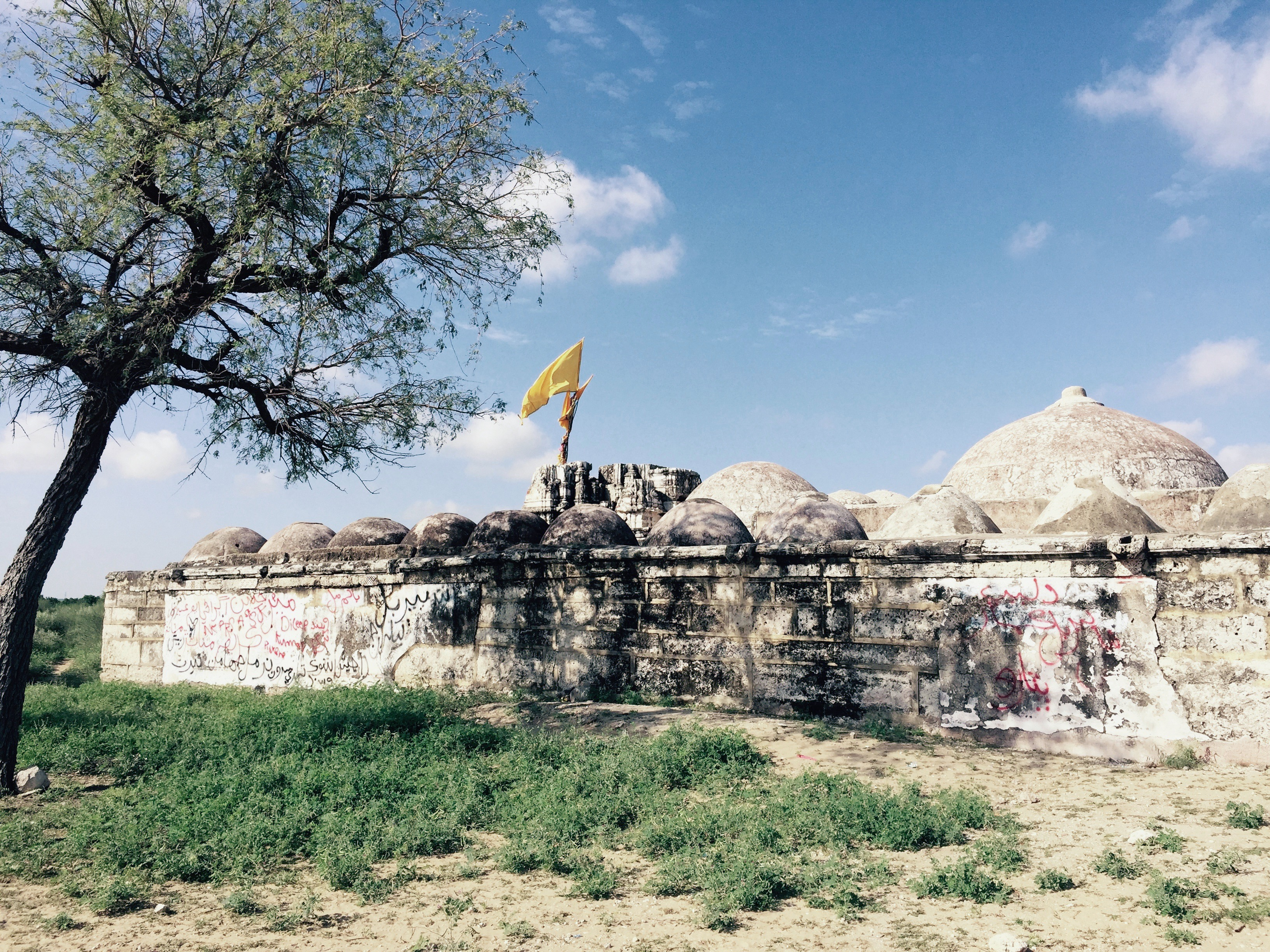
Gori Temple

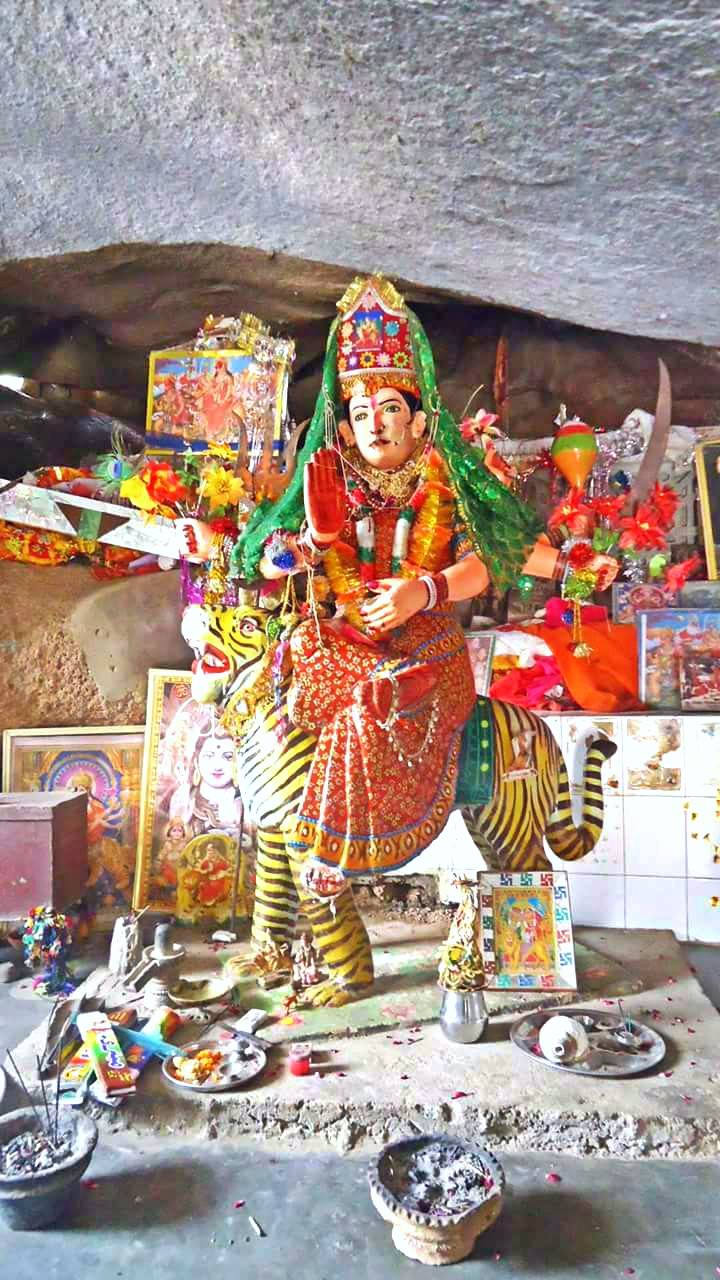
Churrio Durga temple is under threat from the reckless dynamite blast mining

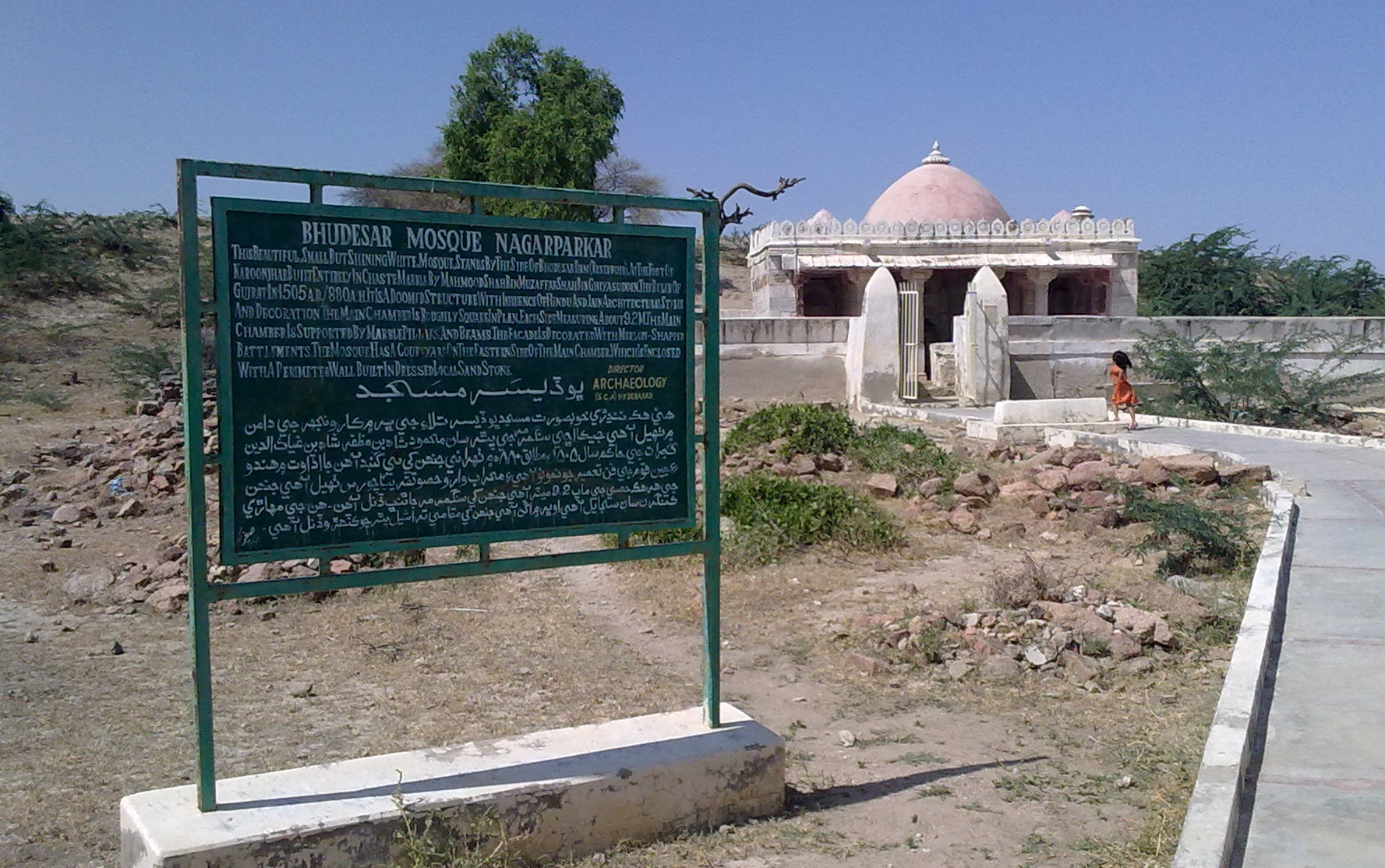
Bhudesar Mosque

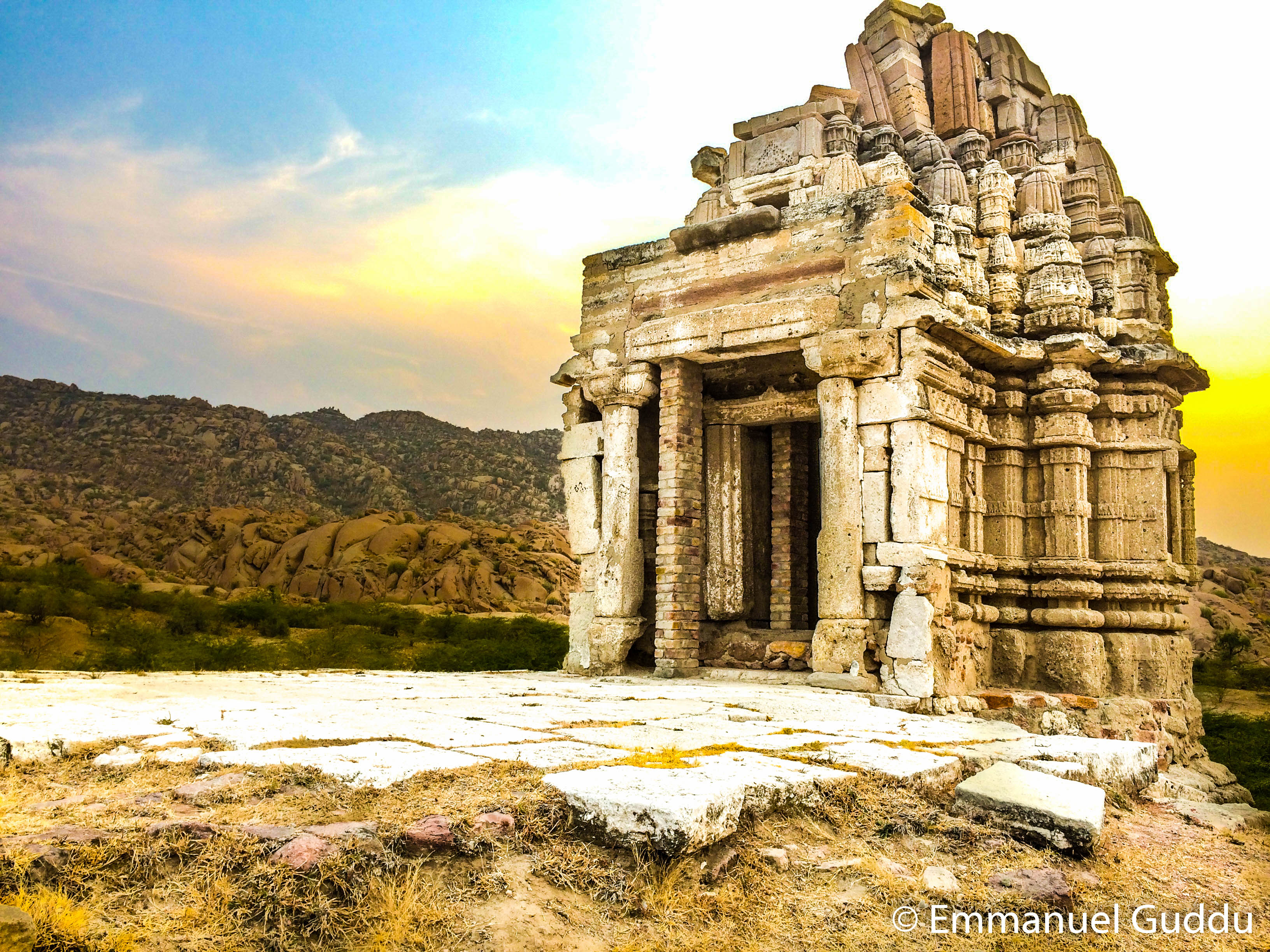
Jain Temple ruins

== See also ==
- Hinglaj Mata mandir
- Sant Nenuram Ashram
