= Karoonjhar Mountains =

Mountain range in Sindh, Pakistan

Karoonjhar Mountains - Sindh (Muhkum Uddin Solangi)
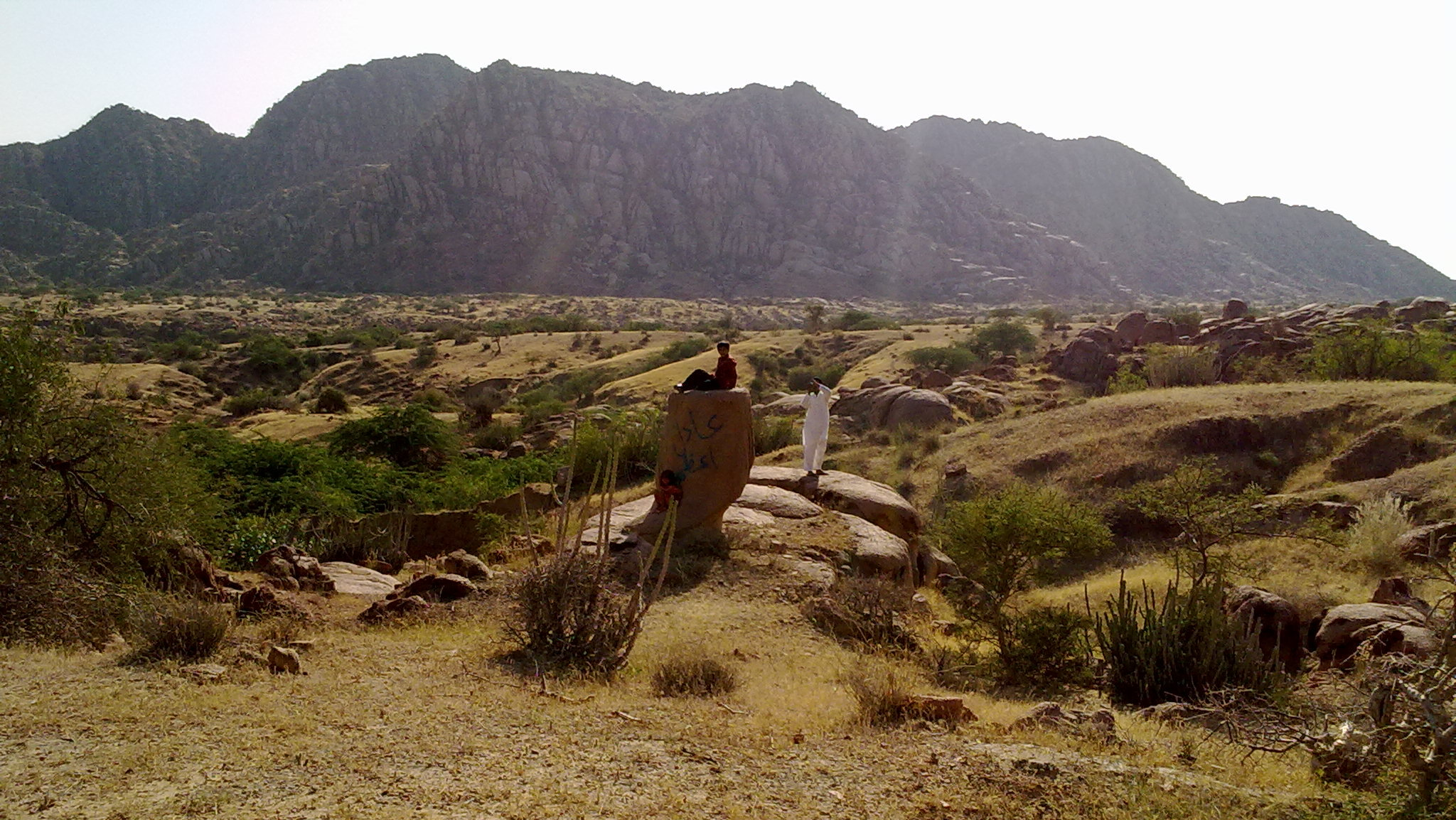
- A view of Karoonjhar Mountains, October 2009

Highest point
- Elevation: 305 m (1,001 ft)

Naming
- Native name: ڪارونجھرُ جبل (Sindhi)

Geography
- Location within Sindh
- Location: Tharparkar District, Sindh, Pakistan
- Range coordinates: 24°20′26″N 70°44′0″E

Karoonjhar Mountains (Sindhi: ڪارونجھرُ جبل, Urdu: کارونجھر پہاڑیاں) are located in south-eastern edge of the Tharparkar district in Sindh, Pakistan. The range is approximately 19 kilometres (12 mi) long and reaches a height of 305 metres (1,001 ft), and contains vaste deposits of granite and Chinese clay.

== Geography ==
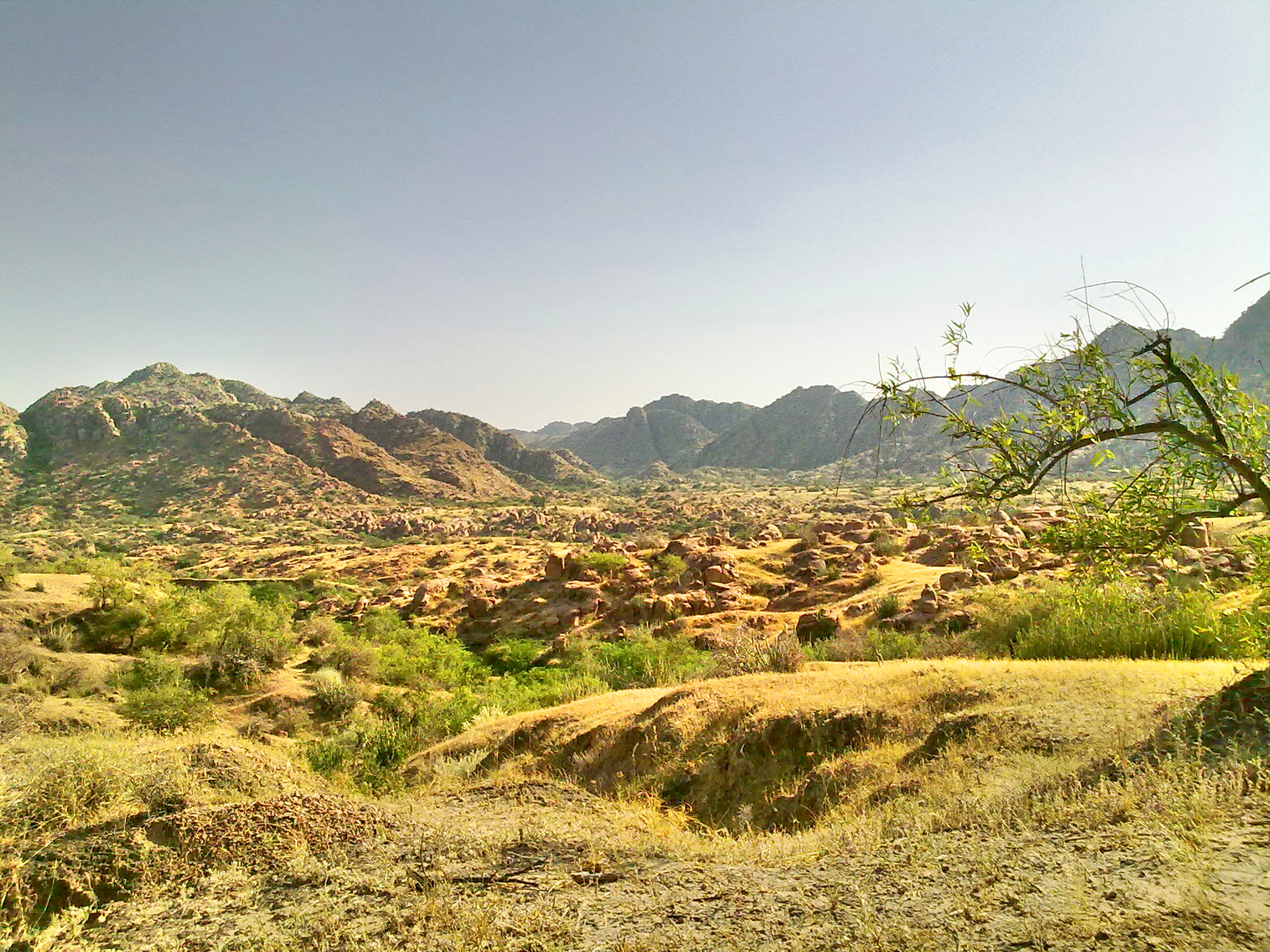

Karoonjhar mountains are located in Nagarparkar near the district Tharparkar on the northern edge of the Rann of Kutch. They mostly consist of granite rock and are likely an extension of the Aravalli Range of India.

The Karoonjhar area is geographically different from the surrounding desert and is very limited in expanse. The mountain range is around 19 kilometers long and 305 meters high. To the east of the main range lie smaller hills which are covered with sparse vegetation. From these hills originate two perennial springs, Achleshwar and Sardharo, and temporary streams, Bhetiani and Gordhro, which flow during the rainy season.

== Climate ==
Karoonjhar Dam is being constructed to supply water to people of Nagarparkar area. In the monsoon season, rainwater pours down from the mountain and flows in more than twenty streams, Bhatiani, Maoo, Gordaro, Ranaser, Sukhpur, Ghatiari, Madanwah, Moondaro, Bhodeser, Lolrai, Drah, Puranwah to the Rann of Kutch. The climate of this mountain range is extreme due to rocky terrain. August and September are only cool months due to monsoon.

== Economic significance ==
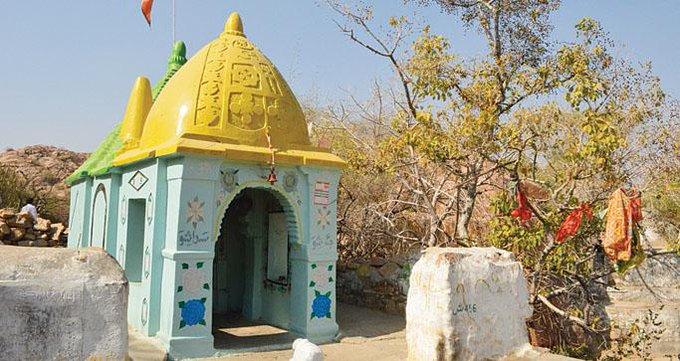
Sardharo temple in Karoonjhar Mountains

Karoonjhar has economic significance for the local people of the area, it is rich in deposits and plant medicinal values. These plants include shatavari, okra and wild onion. This mountain is economically so significant that there is a local saying "Karoonjhar yields a hundred kilos of gold regularly".

== History ==
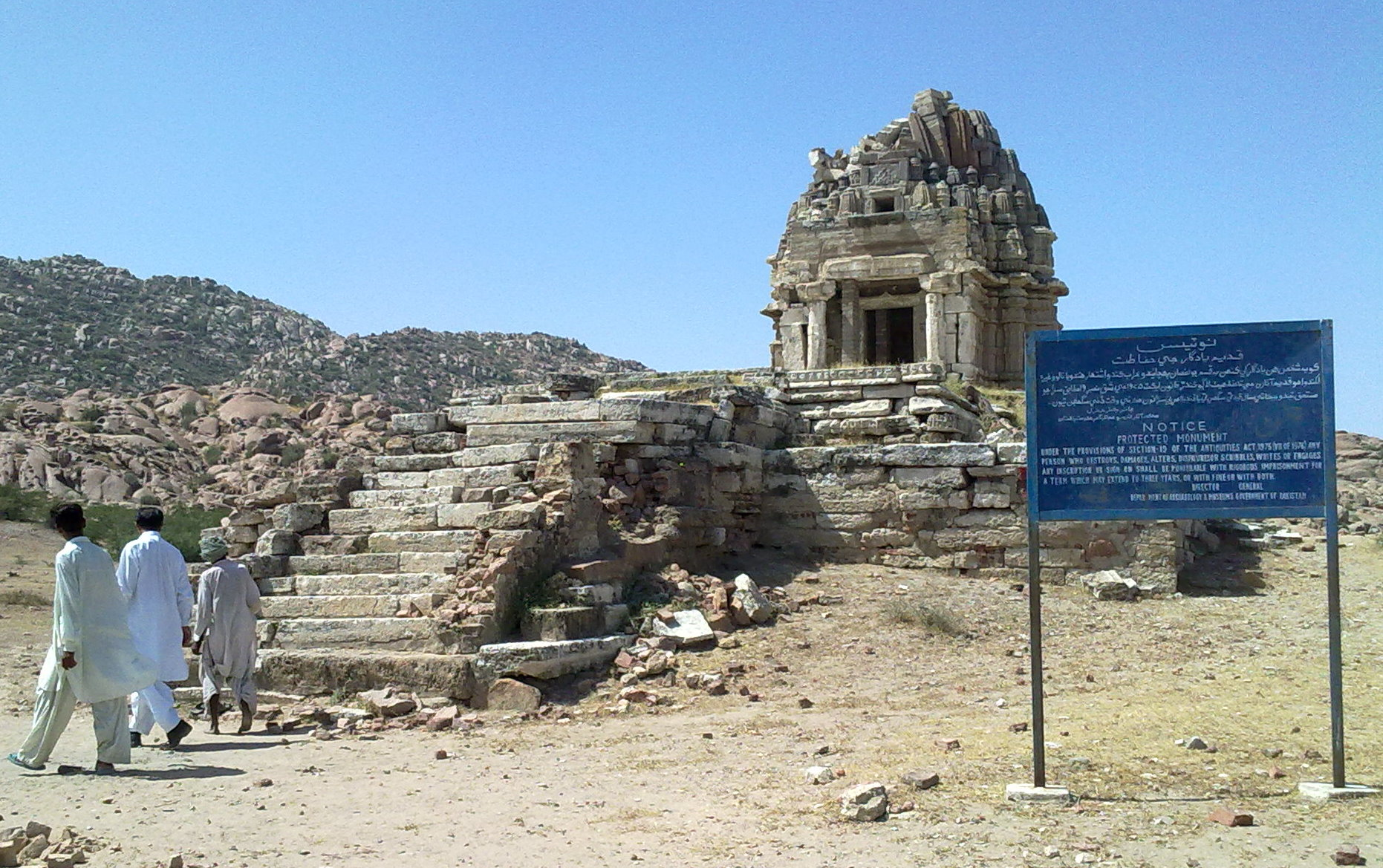
An old Jain temple located at the base of the mountains

Karoonjhar has been mentioned in many verses of Sindhi and Gujarati poets. Myths and lores of Sadwant & Sharanga, Hothlal Pari (nature's fairy), Odho Jam (Sindhi lore) and Bherio Garori (wolf's ring) are regarded to this range. Hothlal Pari is considered to have had appeared first in the Karoonjhar mountains. In old times, Karoonjhar was also famously known as "Kinro". The mountain range has several places of historical importance, like Bhodeser Talao, Alakh Wao (hidden well), Anchlechure, Sardharo, Gao Mukhi, Punraj Gadr, Nani, Chandan gadr, Bhaun jo bheesro, Jharno and Bhaunro. In the past, many individuals were exiled to the Karoonjhar by monarchs of nearby states.

The range was once a stronghold of Jainism in the region. Researcher Mashkoor Phulkaro has written that there are at least 108 holy sites among the surrounding hills Until 1226, the region of Thar was part of a large sea, and the current desert area served as a port and business centre for Jains who formed the business class. Subsequently, an earthquake in Parinagar, the main shipping port, changed its geography, forcing the Jains to move to Kutch and Bhuj in modern day India. Before their exodus, they had built several temples at Karoonjhar Mountain, Nagarparkar, and Parinagar. Of those, just four exist today, and only two of them are in good condition (in Veerawah and Nagarparkar). The last Jain family to leave this area did so in 1971.

== Flora and fauna ==
There are 89 distinct varieties of plants across 26 plant families on the mountains. The dominant families are Poaceae and Fabaceae. Grasses and herbs encompass 60% of the species, alongside a mix of trees, shrubs, and subshrubs.

The fauna of the Karoonjhar Mountains are thought to have included species such as the blackbuck, Indian gazelle, blue bull, and wild boar, which thrived despite the region's harsh climatic conditions and scarce water resources. Large mammals like the lion, cheetah, and desert lynx have vanished from the southern reaches of the desert, while populations of other species have dwindled to the brink of extinction. Karoonjhar is a habitat for a few species of conservation significance, including the Indian gazelle and the desert hare. Predatory carnivores like the jackal, wolf, desert cat, and desert fox, have been hunted for their pelts, which has threatened their presence in the area. Much of it remains unstudied from a conservation perspective. The rodents, comprising a significant portion of the mammalian population, play a crucial role in the desert ecosystem but also pose challenges due to their impact on vegetation and agricultural productivity.

== Illegal Mining of Karoonjhar Mountain ==
The Karoonjhar Mountains have been a subject of concern and legal debate due to proposed mining activities. These mountains, believed to contain extensive deposits of granite and China clay, hold immense cultural, historical, and religious significance.

In a series of historic judicial rulings, the Sindh High Court intervened to protect these mountains from any mining or excavation. The court emphasized that the entire range of Karoonjhar Hills is deemed a single monument under the law, safeguarding it from any form of prohibited excavation, except for exploration related to discovering historical artifacts, which must adhere to international guidelines.

The court underscored that these mountains are part of the Runn Kutch Wildlife Sanctuary and must be protected accordingly under the Sindh Wildlife Protection, Preservation, Conservation, and Management Act, 2020.

Additionally, the court directed the relevant authorities to ensure the restoration of the sanctuary for the local flora and fauna and to monitor the growth of plants and trees by maintaining a record of plantation for each hill in the range. Any commercial activity that could be categorized as mining or excavation within the Karoonjhar Hills was strictly prohibited.

The court further highlighted the historical significance of these mountains, tracing their existence back to approximately three billion years. It emphasized the importance of preserving Jain temples and statues declared as world heritage, urging their resurrection in their original form.

In essence, the legal interventions aim to protect the Karoonjhar Mountains from any form of mining or excavation, emphasizing their historical, cultural, and ecological value as a cherished heritage site in Sindh.

== See also ==
- Churrio Jabal Durga Mata Temple
