= Jainism in Pakistan =

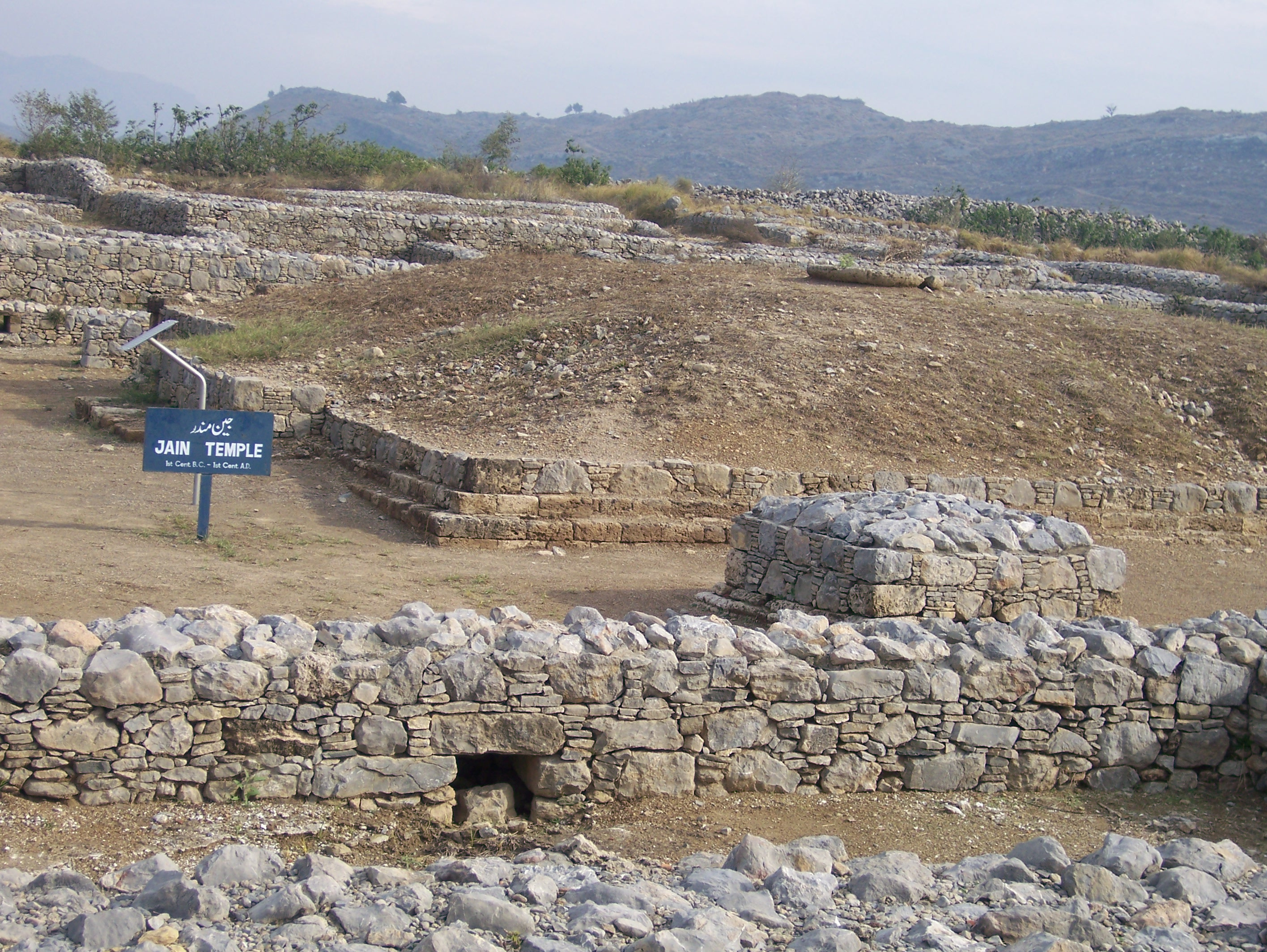
A Jain Temple at Sirkap, part of the Indo-Greek kingdom, near modern-day Taxila, Punjab, Pakistan

Jainism in Pakistan (پاکستان میں جین مت) has an extensive heritage and history. Prior to partition, Jains were less than 1% of the population of what is now Pakistan. There are several ancient Jain shrines scattered across the country. However, much of the Jain heritage is in poor-condition or has been demolished due to a lack of awareness or conservation efforts.

Jainism was prevalent in the region during the Mauryan (3rd century BCE), early Islamic polities (8th–10th centuries CE), Sultanates, Mughal, and British eras. Baba Dharam Dass was a holy man whose tomb is located near the bank of a creek called (Deoka, Deokay, or Degh) near Chawinda Phatic, behind the agricultural main office in Pasrur, near the city of Sialkot in Punjab, Pakistan. Another prominent Jain monk of the region was Vijayanandsuri of Gujranwala, whose samadhi (memorial shrine) still stands in the city.

== Periodisation ==
Muhammad Hameed divides the Jain history in Pakistan into three phrases:

- First phase (ancient phase): earliest confirmed traces of the religion in Sirkap and Taxila, dated to the second century BCE. A later part of this ancient phase was found at Murti, Chakwal district (finds now part of the Lahore Museum)
- Second phase: lasting between the 8th and 12th centuries CE, Jainism takes root in Tharparkar, Sindh, leading to the construction of temples
- Third phrase: lasting from the Mughals to the British, construction of numerous Jain temples, community halls, and houses, abandonment of the region in 1947 by Jains

== History ==
=== Origin ===
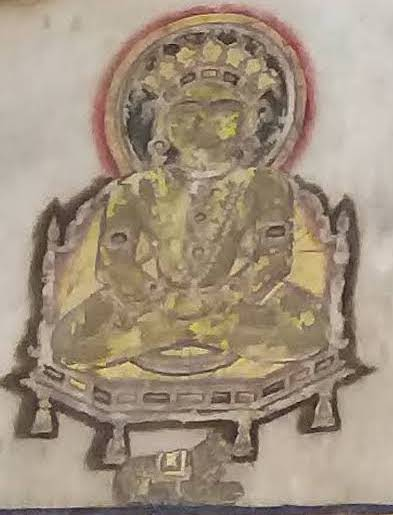
The 24th tirthankar Mahavira, detail from a mural depicting five tirthankars from Parshvanath Jain Shwetambar temple in Multan, Punjab, circa early 19th century

Jainism is one of the earliest belief-systems of the Indian subcontinent. According to Jain tradition, Jainism has been present in Pakistan since the period of Mahavira. Archeological finds at Sirkap can trace a Jain presence in what is now Pakistan to the 1st century BCE. As per Jain lore, Mahavira visited the site of Bhera in Punjab. A 15th century Jain temple was built at the same location. After this, Mahavira travelled to Gujarat, crossing the Punjab Plain and through Tharparkar district in Sindh. A few followers of Mahavira whom were motivated by the principles of non-violence and non-attachment from Punjab and Sindh may have existed during this early-stage of Jain history. The earliest Jain communities seem to have been in Taxila and Tharparkar, before they gradually began settling in different settlements in Punjab and Sindh linked by trade-routes.

=== Ancient period ===
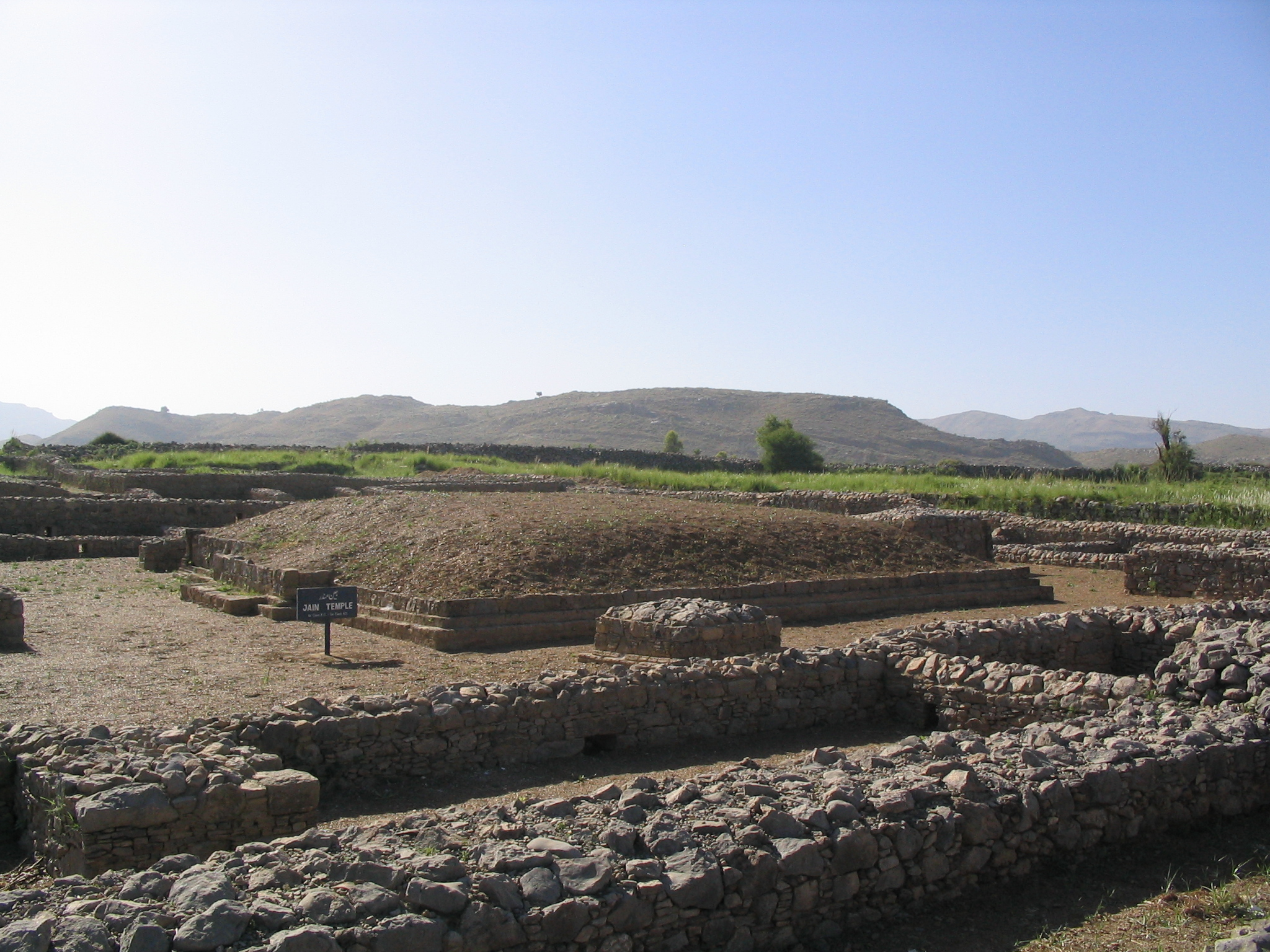
Jain sanctuary uncovered at Sirkap

Taxshila was closely associated with Jainism. According to the Jaina tradition, Rishabhanatha, the first Tirthankara, entrusted the region of Ayodhya to his son Bharata and the region of Takshashila to his son Bahubali.

As per canonical Śvetāmbara Jaina texts Āvaśyaka Cūrṇi and Āvaśyaka Niryukti, Tirthankara Rishabhanatha visited Takshashila while wandering after initiation as a monk millions of years ago. Upon learning of his arrival, Bahubali, who was not in the city at that moment, rushed to the city, but the Rishabhanatha had already departed before Bahubali arrived. His footprints were subsequently consecrated by Bahubali who erected a throne and a dharmachakra ('wheel of the law') over them several miles in height and circumference. The 14th century Vividha Tirtha Kalpa mentions this establishment, stating:

"तक्षशिलायां बाहुबलीविनिर्मितं धर्मचक्रम्॥"
- Ācārya Jinaprabhāsūri in "Vividha Tirtha Kalpa" (p. 85)

As per the canonical Jaina text Mahanishith Sutra, the Dharmachakra Tirtha established by Bahubali is recognized as the abode of Chandraprabha, and Takshashila is also referred to as "Dharmachakra Bhumi," marking its significance as a center of Jainism.

While there is limited information about the subsequent period, it is noted that during the medieval era, Takshashila faced challenges due to the proliferation of fraudulent ascetics and a lack of proper sustenance, leading to restrictions on Jaina ascetics' wandering in the region, as documented in six ancient Jaina texts known as the Chedasūtras.

Emperor Samprati built a Jaina temple known as "Kunala Stupa" in honor of his father Kunala. During Samprati's rule, the extent of the wandering of Jaina monks developed multifold times, and later also included this region.

According to the Prabhavakacharita, by the second or third century CE, Takshashila had approximately 500 Jaina temples and was home to a significant Jaina population. However, a devastating plague struck the city, leading to widespread death and chaos. The Jaina community sent a Sravaka named Virchand to Nadol, who conveyed their suffering to Acharya Manadevasuri. Suri gave "Laghu Shanti Stava," stating that reciting it would alleviate the plague. Following the recitation, the plague subsided within a few days. However, in the third year, the Turks devastated the city.

According to Acharya Dhaneswarasuri's "Shatrunjaya Mahatmya," Javad Shah, a merchant from Mahuva, renovated Palitana temples in Vikrama Samvat 108. He retrieved an image of Rishabhanatha from Takshashila and established it as the principal deity at the principal shrine amongst Shatrunjaya temples. The Gujarati Jain temple Shatrunjaya has a donation record from one Jadav Shah of Taxila.

During Alexander the Great's campaign and the Greek invasion of the Gandhara region in around the 1st century CE, the Greeks recorded encounters with "gymnosophists". The city of Taxila was noted for containing around a hundred Jain stupas (only one of which was identified by John Marshall). Subsequent excavations at the site have uncovered Jain-linked structures, such as the Chirana Padukas at the Murti temple site in Chakwal district.

Excavations in Takshashila support these traditions. Dr. Sir John Marshall noted that Indo-Greek kings displaced the city from its fortified position and settled it in Sirkap during the early years of the second century BCE. The city remained inhabited through the Greek, Shaka, Pahlava, and Kushan periods. Numerous small and large temples have been discovered along the main road of Sirkap. Dr. Marshall concluded that the temples in blocks 'F' and 'G' of Sirkap are Jaina temples due to their architectural similarities with Kankali Tila, a Jaina stupa, found in Mathura. In block 'G,' located on the right side of the main road, numerous ruins of large buildings have been found, characterized by the presence of small temples alongside these structures, which were accessible to devotees. This evidence strongly supports claims by the Jaina tradition that Takshashila was a significant center for Jainism.

While Jainism was present in northern Punjab through the 1st to 2nd centuries CE, there is a lack of ancient remains after this point that have been uncovered. However, Jainism remained active in the Tharparkar region of Sindh, whom were linked to the Jain merchants of Gujarat and Rajasthan.

=== Mediaeval period ===
Xuanzang records meeting Jain monks from both the Digambara and Svetambara sects while travelling in the Punjab in the 7th century. Jainism was active in Tharparkar in Sindh from the 8th century to the British colonial period, with the Jains being active in art, trade, and commerce. Furthermore, Jain temples are found from this period in all the major settlements of Punjab that were linked to trade-routes.

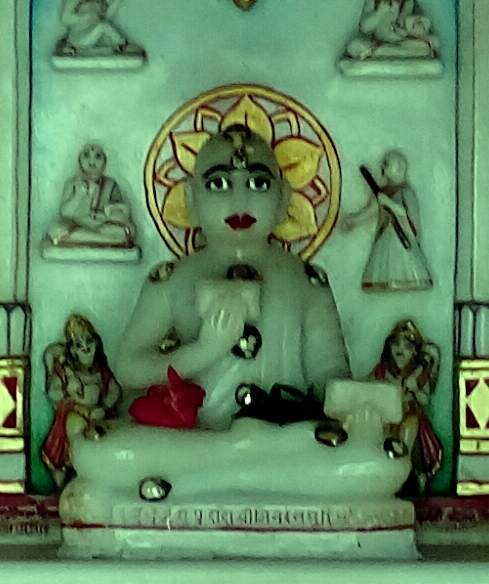
Idol of the first dādā guru Jinadattasuri of the Dādābadī cult of the Kharataragaccha tradition of Śvetāmbara Jainism, whom conducted missionary work in Sindh

During the early Muslim, Sultanate, and Mughal periods, Jainism in what is now Pakistan was mostly confined to Sindh. The main Jain tradition in the region was the Kharataragaccha tradition. Jinadattasuri (1075–1154) the first dadaguru of the Kharataragaccha tradition won converts in Sindh. The Jain merchants that settled west of the Rann of Kutch came under its influence due to the missionary work of Jinakuśalasūri (1280-1332). The dādābāṛī of Jinakuśalasūri conducted missionary work in Halla, Multan, Dera Ghazi Khan, Lahore, Narowal, and other places. At Tharparkar, the tradition of Jinakuśalasūri became the dominant Jain school of thought. During Akbar's reign, a Jain Osavāla official named Karam Chand Bachhawat, who was able to carry out meetings at Lahore between emperor Akbar and the fourth dādāguru Jinacandrasūri VI (1541–1613) in 1592, 1593, and 1594. Jinacandrasūri disemberked from Multan (Mūlasthāna) and Uch (Uccapuri) in 1595 to visit the samadhi of Jinakuśalasūri in Derawar. After this visit, he returned to Rajasthan. Due to Islamic influence and pressure, the image-venerating faction of Jainism (mūrtipūjaka), such as the Kharataragaccha tradition, declined in the region and the non-image-venerating faction (amūrtipūjaka) became popular. In Sindh, the Karoonjhar hill-range was a stronghold of Jainism and considered auspicious, where 109 hills had 108 holy-sites. An earthquake in 1226 CE caused many of the Jains of the Parinagar region to move to Kutch and Bhuj. The three temples of the Bodhesar Jain temples complex were built in 1375, 1449, and 1505.

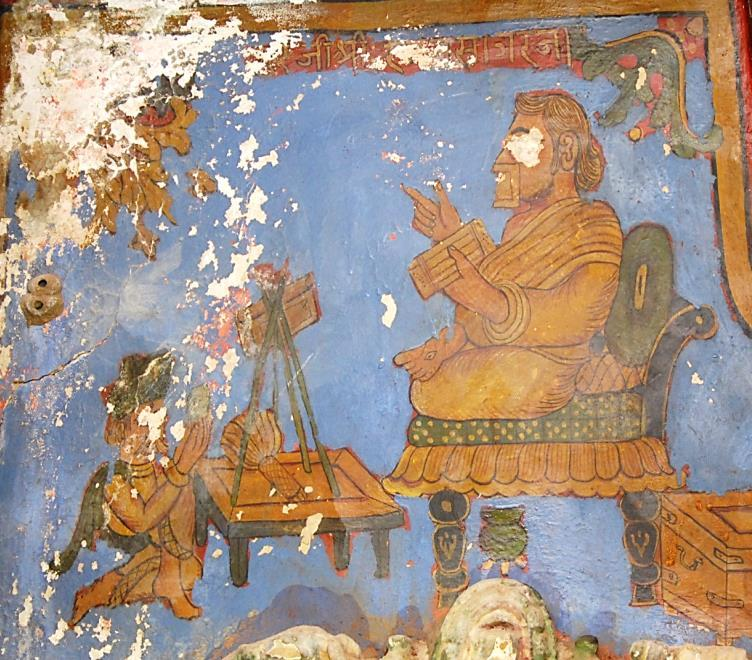
Mural depicting a Śvetāmbara monk and a śrāvaka from the antarala (praggriva) of the Bazaar Mandir of the Nagarparkar Jain temples complex

A Gujarati Jain who was a amūrtipūjaka named Loṅkāgaccha shifted from Gujarat to Lahore and founded the Lāhaurī- or Uttarārdha Loṅkāgaccha. This group founded a gaddī (seat) in Lahore, Jandiyala Guru, Phagvara, Nakodar, Ludhiana, Patti, Samana, Malerkotla, Patiala, Sunam, Ambala, Kasur, among other settlements. The sixth leader of this group, Yati Saravā, initiated the monks Rāyamalla and Bhallo, who were active in the Punjab between 1503–1551. This sect became the most popular Jain tradition in northern Punjab between the 17th and 18th centuries. The image-venerating faction of Jainism later experienced a revival in the Punjab via yatis, with this faction establishing temples at Ramnagar (Rasulnagar), Gujranwala, Sialkot, Pinda Dadan Khan, or Papanakha. Due to the reintroduction of image veneration, an orthodox monk named Haridāsa split between 1673–1693 from the Uttarārdha Loṅkāgaccha and became aligned with the Ḍhūṇḍhaka (Sthānakavāsī) tradition of Lavajī, Gujarat, leading to the foundation of an amūrtipūjaka reformist organization in Lahore, Punjab known as the Pañjāb Lavajī Ṛṣi Saṃpradāya. Eventually, the Uttarārdha Loṅkāgaccha organization was absorbed by the under the leadership of Ācārya Amarasiṃha (1805–1881), allowing the Pañjāb Lavajī Ṛṣi Saṃpradāya to become the most popular and dominant Jain tradition in the Punjab. The Pañjāb Lavajī Ṛṣi Saṃpradāya recruited from the Brahmin, Rajput (Kshatriya), Aggarwal, Jatt, and Bhabra communities, also from the lower-castes. Digambara Jains were generally not found northwest of Ambala.

During the Sikh period, Jains were a fundamental part of the local economy via their role as merchant, being heavily involved in the cloth, grains, general merchandise, jewelry, and banking trades.

=== Colonial period ===
The introduction of railways and more roads under British-rule allowed the Jains to spread further in the Punjab and, settling in places along trade routes. In-regards to caste, in West Punjab the Śvetāmbara Jains usually hailed from the Osavāla caste while in Sindh they usually belonged to the Poravāḍa and Śrīmālī castes. Despite the Punjabi Osavālas, who called themselves Bhābaṛās, having a Rajasthani origin, they gradually lost touch with their homeland and adopted Punjabi as their mother-tongue (also using Urdu and Persian) and stopped marrying Osavālas from Rajasthan. These Bhāvaṛā/Bhābaṛās were prevalent in mercantile, finance, education, and publishing fields, with many locations (such as villages, bazaars, and mohallas) being named after them in Pakistan. The organizations of the Bhabras controlled most of the Jain heritage sites in Pakistan prior to partition. Apart from the Bhabras, other Jain castes/communities were from Brahmin, Rajput, Aggarwal, Jatt, and lower-caste origin.

Digambara Jains were generally not found in the Punjab but due to them supplying the British military, some communities of Aggarwal (Agravālas) followers of the Terāpanth tradition arose in the cantonment sections of Rawalpindi, Sialkot, Lahore, and Karachi. A Digambar bhaṭṭāraka seat was also found in Multan. Between 1855–1875, another spilt in the Punjabi Jain community occurred when sixteen mendicants of the Ludhiana-based Sthānakavāsī Gaṅgārāma Jīvarāja Saṃpradāya and joined with an amūrtipūjaka tradition of Tapāgaccha from Gujarat. The Jain leaders of the most popular Punjabi branch of the Tapāgaccha, known as the Vallabha Samudāy, were Buddhivijaya (Sthānakavāsī name: Būṭerāya, 1806–1882), Vijayānandasūri or Ātmānanda (Sthānakavāsī name: Ātmārāma, 1836–1896), and Panjāb Kesarī Vijayavallabhasūri (1870–1954). The Vallabha Samudāy were fundamental in ensuring the survival of Jainism in Punjab during the colonial-period, where there were rival religious groups, such as Christian missionaries and the Arya Samaj, generating a revival of Jainism in the region through the construction of new temples. The Loṅkā tradition (Uttarārdha Loṅkāgaccha) was disappearing around this time, so its former temples were re-purposed by the followers of the Vallabha Samudāy. Meanwhile, the Sthānakavāsī tradition rejected any construction of new temples and halls, as they viewed this as being "violent" and against their tenets, preferring empty rooms or buildings, but they also began taking over former Loṅkā sites in the late 19th century.

In Rawalpindi in the 1930s, a Jain named Muni Khazāncan of the Pañjāb Saṃpradāya (Pañjāb Lavajī Ṛṣi Saṃpradāya), supported by Pañjāb Kesarī Ācārya Kāśīrām (1884-1945), began a movement against the Sthānakavāsīs by promoting the construction of new religious schools and libraries (sthānakas), starting first in Rawalpindi with his movement spreading later to Gujranwala, Jhelum, Kasur, Lahore, Sialkot, Maler Kotla, and Dhuri. Between 1855–1945, Vijayānandasūri also managed to convert śrāvakas of the Sthānakavāsī tradition to the Tapāgaccha tradition. The Pañjāb Lavajī Ṛṣi Saṃpradāya banned inter-sectarian marriages or people from different Jain sects from eating together, leading to communal divisions within the regional Osavāla caste.

The Nahata family constructed Jain temples in Multan, which was 0.04% Jain in 1941.

=== 1947–present ===
Prior to the partition of India, Jains constituted around 1% of what is now Pakistan. Most Jains fled the region during the partition of India in 1947, with them settling in the newfound Republic of India. Some Jains stayed behind but they too left during the religious riots of the 1970s and 1990s. In 1971, the last Jain family left the Karoonjhar region in Sindh. The fleeing Jain community took their tirthankar sculptures, artwork, and literature with them but their temples and other properties remained in Pakistan. Some Jain monks, such as Vijayavallabhasūri, broke religious vows to migrate to India for their survival by using trucks, trains or planes. Meanwhile, other Jains converted to Islam. The Jains refugees who moved eastward to India usually settled in Indian Punjab, Haryana, Rajasthan, Uttar Pradesh, and Delhi. A smaller minority of Jains remain in Pakistan, mostly confined to the Nagarparkar region of Sindh. The Jains of Multan, including the Nahata family, fled for India during partition, along with their monks and murtis. The Nahata family used an airplane to escape, with the Multani Jain artefacts and monks being shifted to a temple in Jaipur. Former Jain sites in Pakistan often became the residences of Muslim refugees from India, while Jain refugees from Pakistan often settled in former Muslim residences in India. The Shri Amar Jain Hostel Lahore was shifted to Chandigarh. Most of the Jain manuscripts and literature that were in Pakistan were transferred to the B. L. Institute in Delhi after partition, although other works were destroyed or went missing.

Jainism and Jain sites are classified as "Hindu" in Pakistan. In 1960, the Evacuee Trust Property Board (Awqaf) was formed to caretake the former sites of Sikhs and Hindus in Pakistan, with Jain heritage being classified as "Hindu" by them. Former Jain ghar-mandirs, upashraya, sthanaks, and sikhar band mandirs have been re-purposed for other uses by the Pakistani authorities and populace. Revenge attacks after the December 1992 Babri Masjid incident led to vandalism and destruction of Jain temples in Pakistan, as mobs were unable to differentiate between Hindu and Jain temples. A Jain temple in Lahore was destroyed in this manner but has since been rebuilt.

A few Jain families still live in Mithi, Islamkot and Nagarparkar, without any operational worship places and they are reluctant to reveal their religious affiliation. In Sindh today, some Kharataragaccha followers still exist. In 2018, it was noted that only Pakistanis living in former Jain-inhabited areas over the age of 80 had any memories of their former Jain neighbours (Bhabras). Very little research has been undertaken examining Jainism in Pakistan. Jain artefacts and artwork can be found in the Lahore Museum, Umerkot Museum, and Bahawalpur Museum. The museums fail to make a distinction between Jain and Hindu artefacts in their collection. The Murti collection that Stein excavated is in storage at the Lahore Museum and inaccessible. Jain literature can be found at Lahore Museum Library, Punjab University’s Woolner Collection, Khilafat Library Rabwah, and the Punjab Public Library Lahore. Some Jain literature written in Gurmukhi and Devangari scripts may exist at Khilafat Library Rabwah, Punjab Public Library, Punjab University Library, Iqbal Public Library Lyallpur, National Archives, National Documentation Center, and the Punjab Archives but this is yet to be ascertained due to the lack of indexing/cataloguing of these writings written in Indic scripts.

== Demography ==
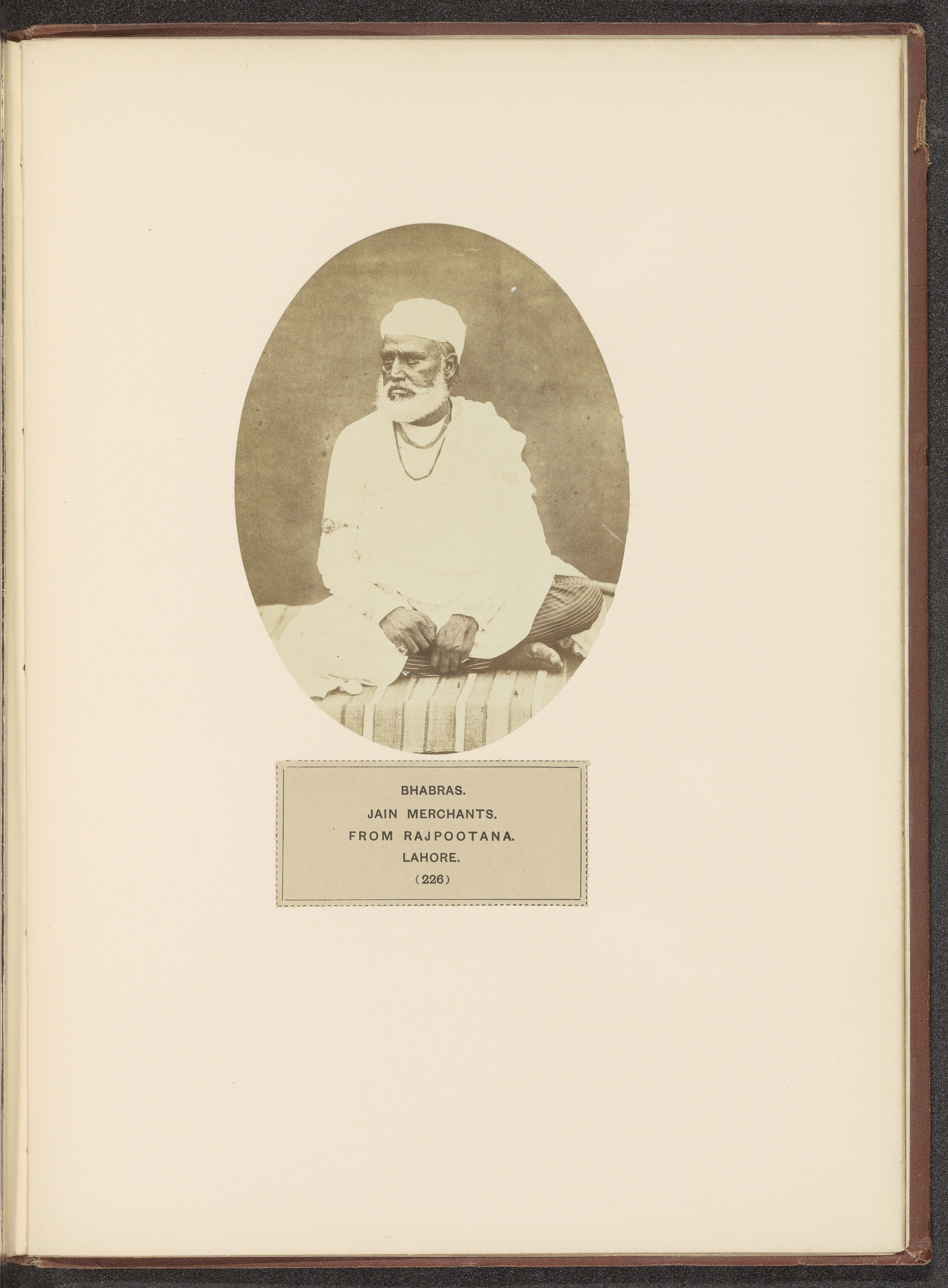
Portrait of an unknown Jain Bhabra merchant in Lahore, ca.1859–69

The presence of Pakistani Jains in modern Pakistan is unclear. Prior to 1947, there were Punjabi, Marwadi and Gujarati communities of Jains in the Punjab and Sindh regions. All of them migrated to India during the partition in 1947, thus ending the thousands of years of presence of Jainism in the region.

Bhabra (or Bhabhra) is an ancient merchant community from Punjab which mainly follows Jainism. The original home region of the Bhabras is now in Pakistan. While practically all the Bhabras have left Pakistan, many cities still have sections named after Bhabras.

- Sialkot: All the Jains here were Bhabra and mainly lived in Sialkot and Pasrur. The Serai Bhabrian and Bhabrian Wala localities are named after them. There were several Jain temples here before partition of India.
- Pasrur: Pasrur was developed by a Jain zamindar who was granted land by Raja Maan Singh. Baba Dharam Dass belonged to the zamindar family who was murdered on a trading visit.
- Gujranwala: Two old Jain libraries managed by Lala Karam Chand Bhabra were present here which were visited by Ramkrishna Gopal Bhandarkar.
- Lahore: There were Jain temples at localities still called Thari Bhabrian and Gali Bhabrian.
- Rawalpindi: Bhabra Bazar is named after them.
- Mianwali: A well known cast still present in majority there nowadays.

Some also lived in Sindh.

=== Colonial era ===
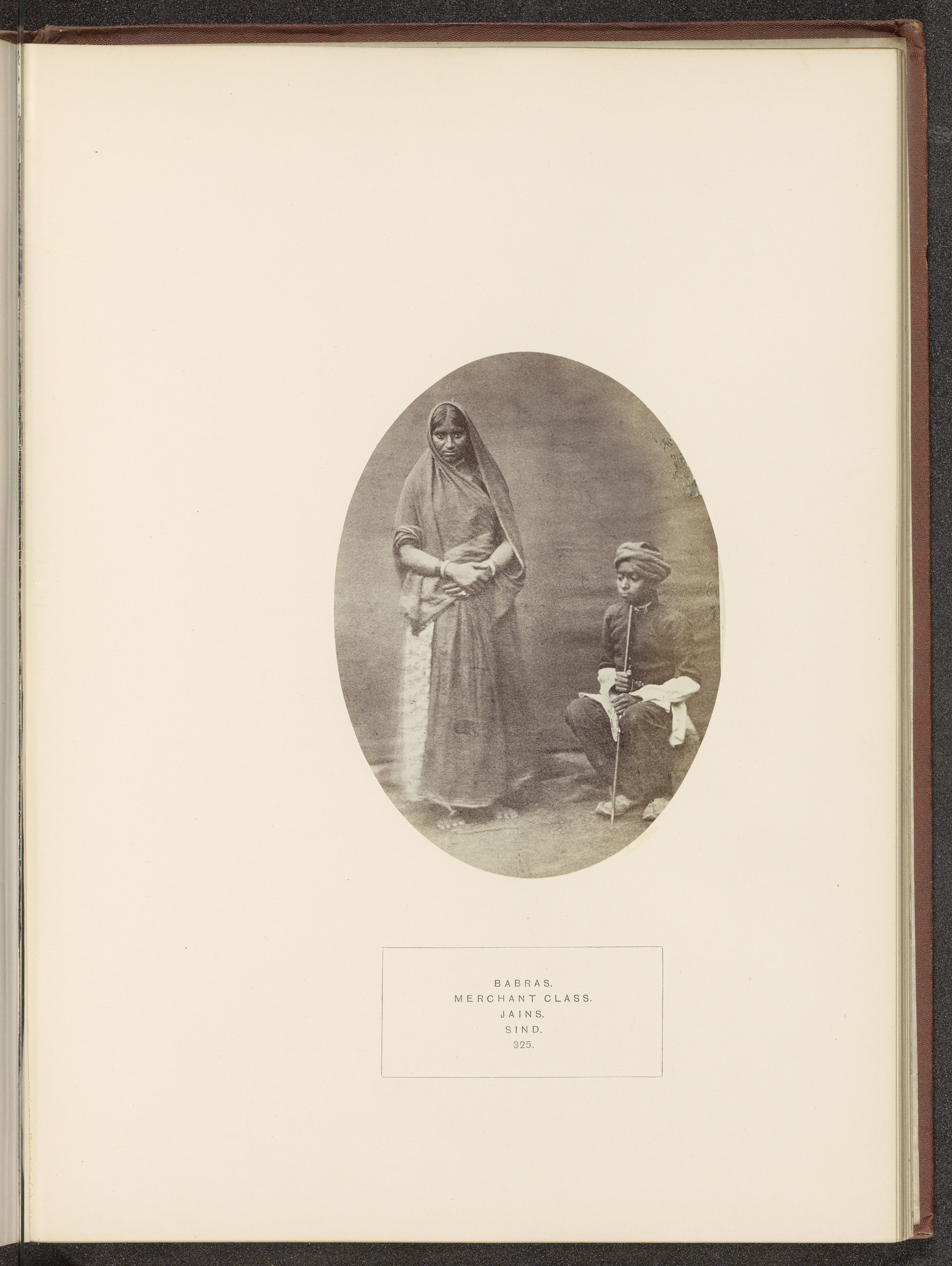
Jains of Sindh

The total population of the region that composes contemporary Pakistan was approximately 29,643,600 according to the final census prior to partition in 1941. With the exception of the Federally Administered Tribal Areas, all administrative divisions in the region that composes contemporary Pakistan collected religious data, with a combined total population of 27,266,001, for an overall response rate of 92.0 percent. Similar to the contemporary era, where censuses do not collect religious data in Azad Jammu and Kashmir and Gilgit–Baltistan, the total number of responses for religion is slightly smaller than the total population, as detailed in the table breakdown below.

Jainism in Pakistan by administrative division (Note: 1941 figure taken from census data by combining the total population of all administrative divisions that compose the region of contemporary Pakistan, including Punjab, (Note: 1941 figure taken from census data by combining the total population of all districts (Lahore, Sialkot, Gujranwala, Sheikhupura, Gujrat, Shahpur, Jhelum, Rawalpindi, Attock, Mianwali, Montgomery, Lyallpur, Jhang, Multan, Muzaffargargh, Dera Ghazi Khan), one tehsil (Shakargarh – then part of Gurdaspur District), one princely state (Bahawalpur), and one tract (Biloch Trans–Frontier) in Punjab Province, British India that ultimately fell on the western side of the Radcliffe Line. See 1941 census data here: Immediately following the partition of India in 1947, these districts and tract would ultimately make up the subdivision of West Punjab, which also later included Bahawalpur. The state that makes up this region in the contemporary era is Punjab, Pakistan.) Sindh, (Note: 1941 figure taken from census data by combining the total population of all districts (Dadu, Hyderabad, Karachi, Larkana, Nawabshah, Sukkur, Tharparkar, Upper Sind Frontier), and one princely state (Khairpur), in Sindh Province, British India. See 1941 census data here:) Khyber Pakhtunkhwa, (Note: Religious data only collected in North West Frontier Province, and not in the Federally Administered Tribal Areas. Total responses to religion includes North West Frontier Province (Khyber Pakhtunkhwa), and total population includes both North West Frontier Province and the Federally Administered Tribal Areas, both administrative divisions which later amalgamated to become Khyber Pakhtunkhwa.) Balochistan, Azad Jammu and Kashmir, (Note: 1941 figure taken from census data by combining the total population of two districts (Mirpur and Muzaffarabad) and one Jagir (Poonch) in the Princely State of Jammu and Kashmir that ultimately would be administered by Pakistan, in the contemporary self-administrative territory of Azad Jammu and Kashmir. See 1941 census data here:) and Gilgit–Baltistan. (Note: 1941 figure taken from census data by combining the total population of one district (Astore) and one agency (Gilgit) in the Princely State of Jammu and Kashmir that ultimately would be administered by Pakistan, in the contemporary administrative territory of Gilgit–Baltistan. See 1941 census data here:))
Administrative division	1941 census			
Administrative division	Jain Population	Jain Percentage	Total Responses	Total Population
Punjab	9,520	0.05%	17,350,103	17,350,103
Sindh	3,687	0.08%	4,840,795	4,840,795
Balochistan	7	0.001%	857,835	857,835
Khyber Pakhtunkhwa	1	0%	3,038,067	5,415,666
AJK	0	0%	1,073,154	1,073,154
Gilgit–Baltistan	0	0%	116,047	116,047
Pakistan	13,215	0.05%	27,266,001	29,643,600

==== Punjab ====
Jain population in West Punjab
Year	Pop.	±% p.a.
1881	4,352	—
1901	5,562	+1.23%
1911	5,977	+0.72%
1921	5,930	−0.08%
1931	6,921	+1.56%
1941	9,520	+3.24%

Jains in the administrative divisions that compose the contemporary Punjab, Pakistan region (1881–1941)
District or Princely State	1881		1901		1911		1921		1931		1941	
District or Princely State	Pop.	%	Pop.	%	Pop.	%	Pop.	%	Pop.	%	Pop.	%
Sialkot District	1,388	0.14%	2,008	0.19%	2,029	0.21%	2,147	0.23%	2,236	0.23%	3,250	0.27%
Rawalpindi District	1,033	0.13%	1,068	0.11%	1,028	0.19%	954	0.17%	1,077	0.17%	1,337	0.17%
Lahore District	970	0.1%	1,047	0.09%	1,139	0.11%	1,209	0.11%	1,450	0.11%	1,951	0.12%
Gujranwala District	577	0.09%	932	0.12%	950	0.1%	754	0.12%	1,071	0.15%	1,445	0.16%
Bahawalpur State	254	0.04%	0	0%	15	0%	1	0%	12	0%	351	0.03%
Jhelum District	58	0.01%	151	0.03%	163	0.03%	195	0.04%	209	0.04%	159	0.03%
Multan District	47	0.01%	134	0.02%	394	0.05%	28	0%	440	0.04%	552	0.04%
Muzaffargarh District	11	0%	0	0%	1	0%	6	0%	0	0%	0	0%
Shahpur District	9	0%	2	0%	5	0%	3	0%	14	0%	13	0%
Jhang District	4	0%	0	0%	4	0%	7	0%	0	0%	5	0%
Montgomery District	1	0%	8	0%	13	0%	12	0%	38	0%	49	0%
Gujrat District	0	0%	11	0%	48	0.01%	4	0%	32	0%	10	0%
Dera Ghazi Khan District	0	0%	143	0.03%	23	0%	296	0.06%	125	0.03%	106	0.02%
Shakargarh Tehsil (Note: Part of Gurdaspur District which was awarded to Pakistan as part of the Radcliffe Line.)	0	0%	0	0%	0	0%	0	0%	0	0%	0	0%
Mianwali District	—N/a	—N/a	35	0.01%	31	0.01%	0	0%	20	0%	23	0%
Lyallpur District (Note: District formerly inscribed as the Chenab Colony on the 1901 census, later renamed to Lyallpur District, created between Jhang District, Gujranwala District, Lahore District, Montgomery District, and Multan District to account for the large population increase in the region, primarily due to the Chenab Canal Colony.)	—N/a	—N/a	23	0%	125	0.01%	231	0.02%	95	0.01%	35	0%
Biloch Trans–Frontier Tract	—N/a	—N/a	0	0%	0	0%	0	0%	0	0%	0	0%
Attock District (Note: District created in 1904 by taking Talagang Tehsil from Jhelum District and Pindi Gheb, Fateh Jang and Attock Tehsils from Rawalpindi District.)	—N/a	—N/a	—N/a	—N/a	9	0%	5	0%	2	0%	13	0%
Sheikhupura District (Note: District created between Gujranwala District, Sialkot District, Amritsar District, Lahore District, Montgomery District, and Lyallpur District in 1920 to account for the large population increase in the region, primarily due to the Chenab Canal Colony.)	—N/a	—N/a	—N/a	—N/a	—N/a	—N/a	78	0.01%	100	0.01%	221	0.03%
Total Jains	4,352	0.05%	5,562	0.05%	5,977	0.05%	5,930	0.05%	6,921	0.05%	9,520	0.05%
Total Population	7,942,399	100%	10,427,765	100%	11,104,585	100%	11,888,985	100%	14,040,798	100%	17,350,103	100%

==== Sindh ====
Jain population in Sindh
Year	Pop.	±% p.a.
1881	1,191	—
1891	923	−2.52%
1901	921	−0.02%
1911	1,349	+3.89%
1921	1,534	+1.29%
1931	1,144	−2.89%
1941	3,687	+12.42%

Jains in administrative divisions in Sindh (1881–1941)
District or Princely State	1881		1891		1901		1911		1921		1931		1941	
District or Princely State	Pop.	%	Pop.	%	Pop.	%	Pop.	%	Pop.	%	Pop.	%	Pop.	%
Tharparkar District	1,038	0.51%	823	0.28%	657	0.18%	524	0.11%	268	0.07%	320	0.07%	212	0.04%
Hyderabad District	144	0.02%	0	0%	119	0.01%	171	0.02%	82	0.01%	187	0.03%	217	0.03%
Karachi District	9	0%	99	0.02%	126	0.02%	650	0.12%	1,118	0.21%	629	0.1%	3,215	0.45%
Shikarpur District/ Sukkur District (Note: 1901: District headquarters shifted from Shikarpur to Sukkur, while district bifurcation created Larkana District.)	0	0%	1	0%	0	0%	3	0%	16	0%	2	0%	0	0%
Upper Sind Frontier District	0	0%	0	0%	19	0.01%	0	0%	49	0.02%	4	0%	0	0%
Khairpur State	0	0%	0	0%	0	0%	0	0%	0	0%	0	0%	0	0%
Larkana District	—N/a	—N/a	—N/a	—N/a	—N/a	—N/a	1	0%	0	0%	1	0%	0	0%
Nawabshah District	—N/a	—N/a	—N/a	—N/a	—N/a	—N/a	—N/a	—N/a	1	0%	1	0%	0	0%
Dadu District	—N/a	—N/a	—N/a	—N/a	—N/a	—N/a	—N/a	—N/a	—N/a	—N/a	—N/a	—N/a	43	0.01%
Total Jains	1,191	0.05%	923	0.03%	921	0.03%	1,349	0.04%	1,534	0.04%	1,144	0.03%	3,687	0.08%
Total Population	2,542,976	100%	3,003,711	100%	3,410,223	100%	3,737,223	100%	3,472,508	100%	4,114,253	100%	4,840,795	100%

== Jain temples ==
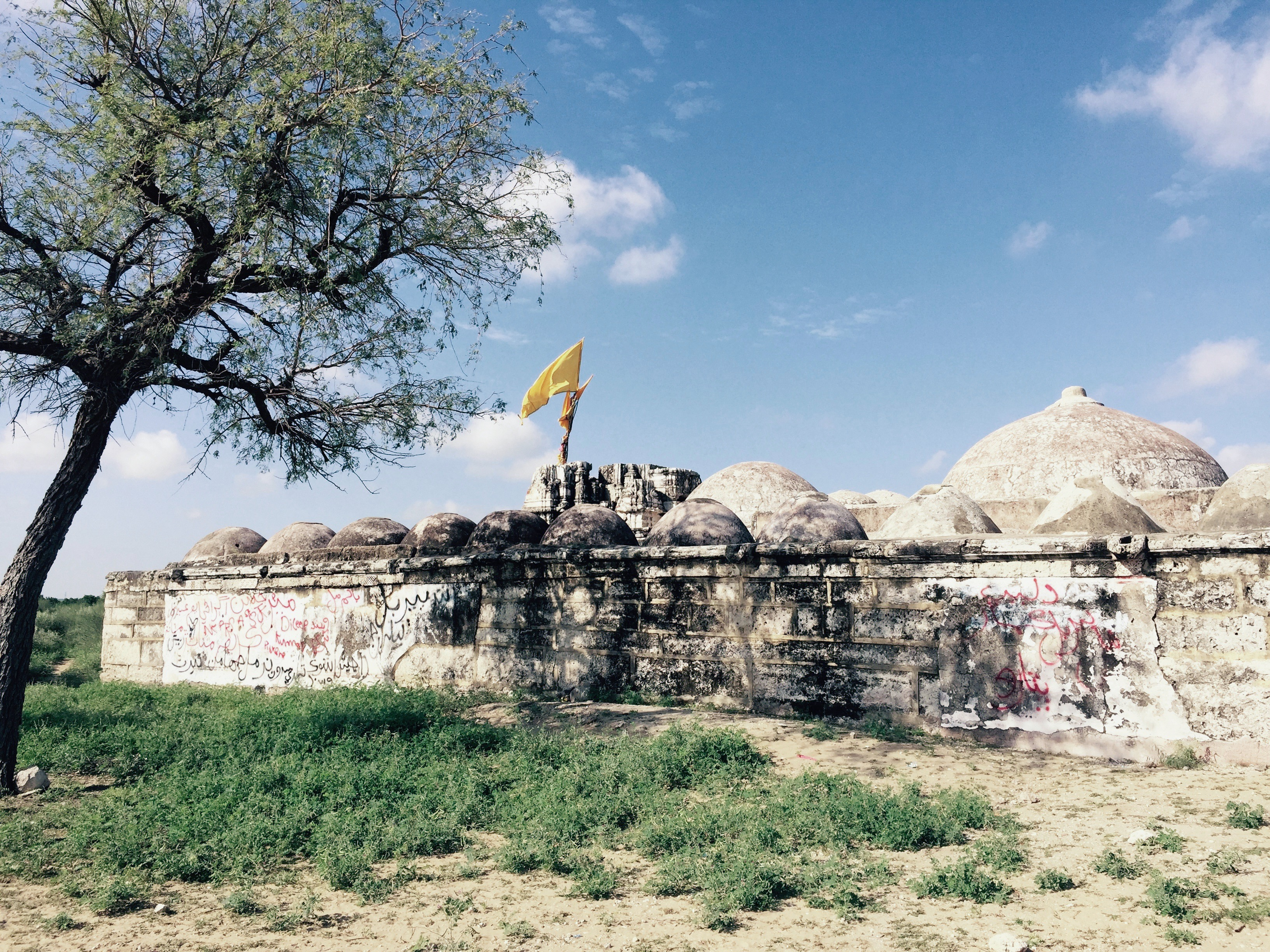
The original Gori Temple with 52 domes, Nagarparkar

Much of the Jain heritage in Pakistan remains unstudied and undeciphered. The Jains throughout their history in the region constructed temples (known as a derasar), memorials (samadhis), community-halls (especially the Sthanakvasi sect), and schools, especially in northern Punjab. Much of the remaining Jain heritage is located in the northern and southern parts of western Punjab. No Jain structures have been identified from the period of Mahavira in the 6th century BCE. However, remains of Jain temples at Sirkap dating to the 1st–2nd centuries CE has been identified. Some Jain architectural remains from the Murti site in Chakwal dating to a later period are known, with some of it being housed at the Jaina Gallery in the Lahore Museum.

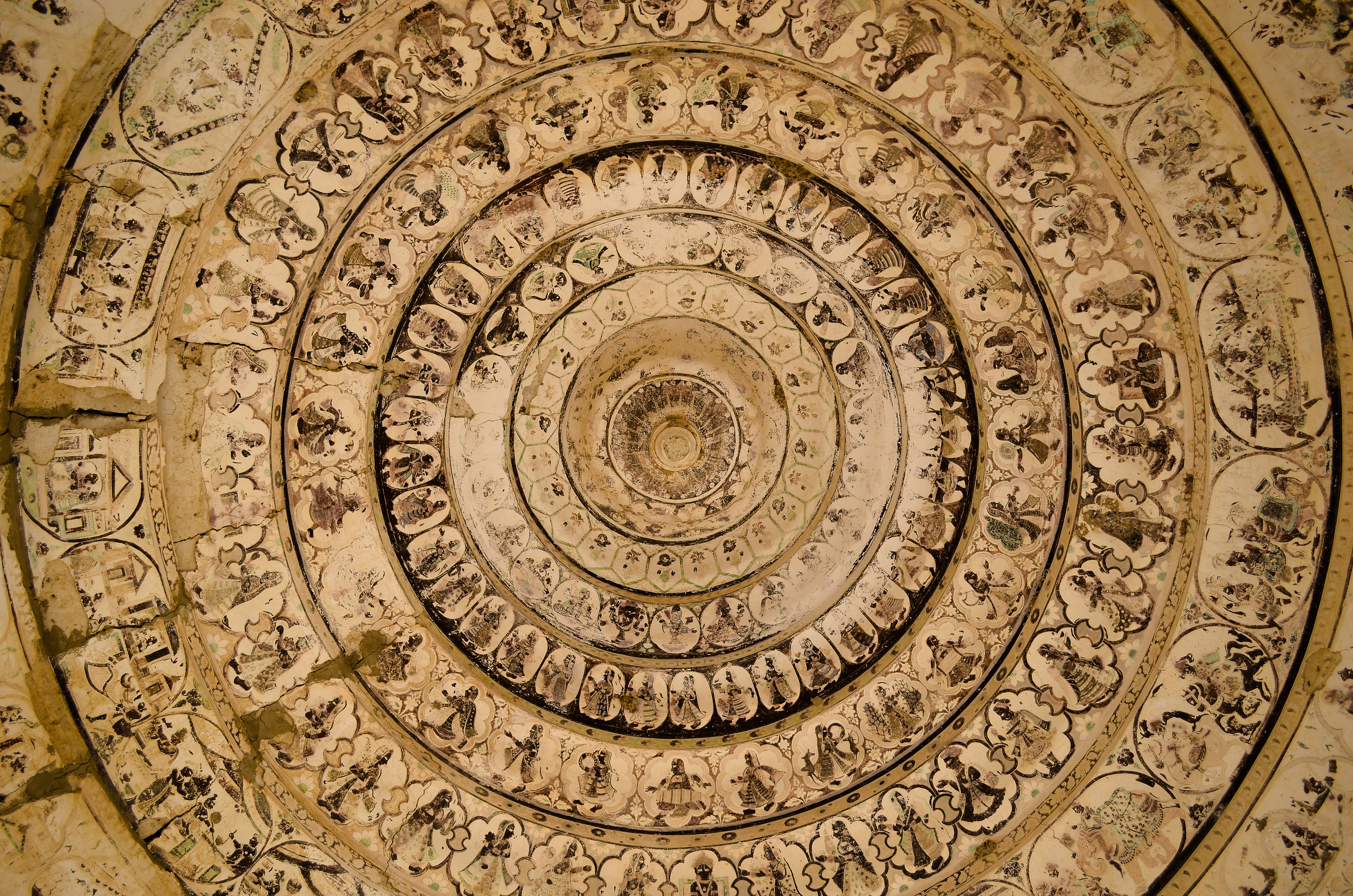
Symbolic and historical Artwork in the original Gori Temple

Later Jain structures from the mediaeval period are found at Tharparkar in Sindh, such as three temples at Bhodesar village near the Karoonjhar Hills, with one temple dating to the 10th-11th centuries CE. Meanwhile, there are also the Gauri and Virawah temples off of Mithi-Islamkot road. The Gauri temple is a large complex in the Thar desert dedicated to Parsvanatha or Godichi. There are a further two temples in Karojain. Within Nagarparkar city, there is the Bazaar Mandir Jain temple. The Nagarparkar temples are heavily influenced by Rajasthani and Gujarati art while their architecture is influenced by the North Indian Nagara style. The Jain temple remains in the region are at risk of total loss due to apathy and environmental conditions and disasters, such as earthquakes and rainfall. Some of the destruction is due to human activity, such as treasure-hunters. The Nagara spire of one of the Bhodesar temples recent collapsed but a team is attempting to restore it. The sculptures and paintings present within the temples have been vandalized, such as by scratching them. Furthermore, their marble floors are being damaged. It is uncertain if the Gori Jo Temple in Sindh was a temple or a residential learning facility. The Bodesar mosque near the Karoonjhar hills in Sindh combines Islamic and Jain architecture. There are at-least four Jain temples in the Karoonjhar mountains, Parinagar, and Nagarpakar in Sindh, with two of them being in decent-condition (in Veerawah and Nagarparkar).

In Punjab, the former Jain temples are often used as local residences and the sanctum santorum (gambhara) as store-rooms. Also, the prayer-halls (mandapas) are used as stables or scrap-yards. Examples of this repurposing of former Jain temples include the Jain Manzil Tehsil Bazaar in the walled-city of Lahore (used as a stable) and the temple at Bagh Mohalla in Jhelum (used as a scrap-yard).The Jain temple at Rasulnagar in Gujranwala district lost many of its paintings due to vandalism by scratching. Very few Jain temples of the Digambar sect survive in Pakistan, most of their former temples in the cantonment areas of Rawalpindi, Lahore, Sialkot, and Karachi have been demolished since 1947. However, a couple of Digambar temples can still be found in the bazaar areas of the old walled-city of Multan and the cantonment.

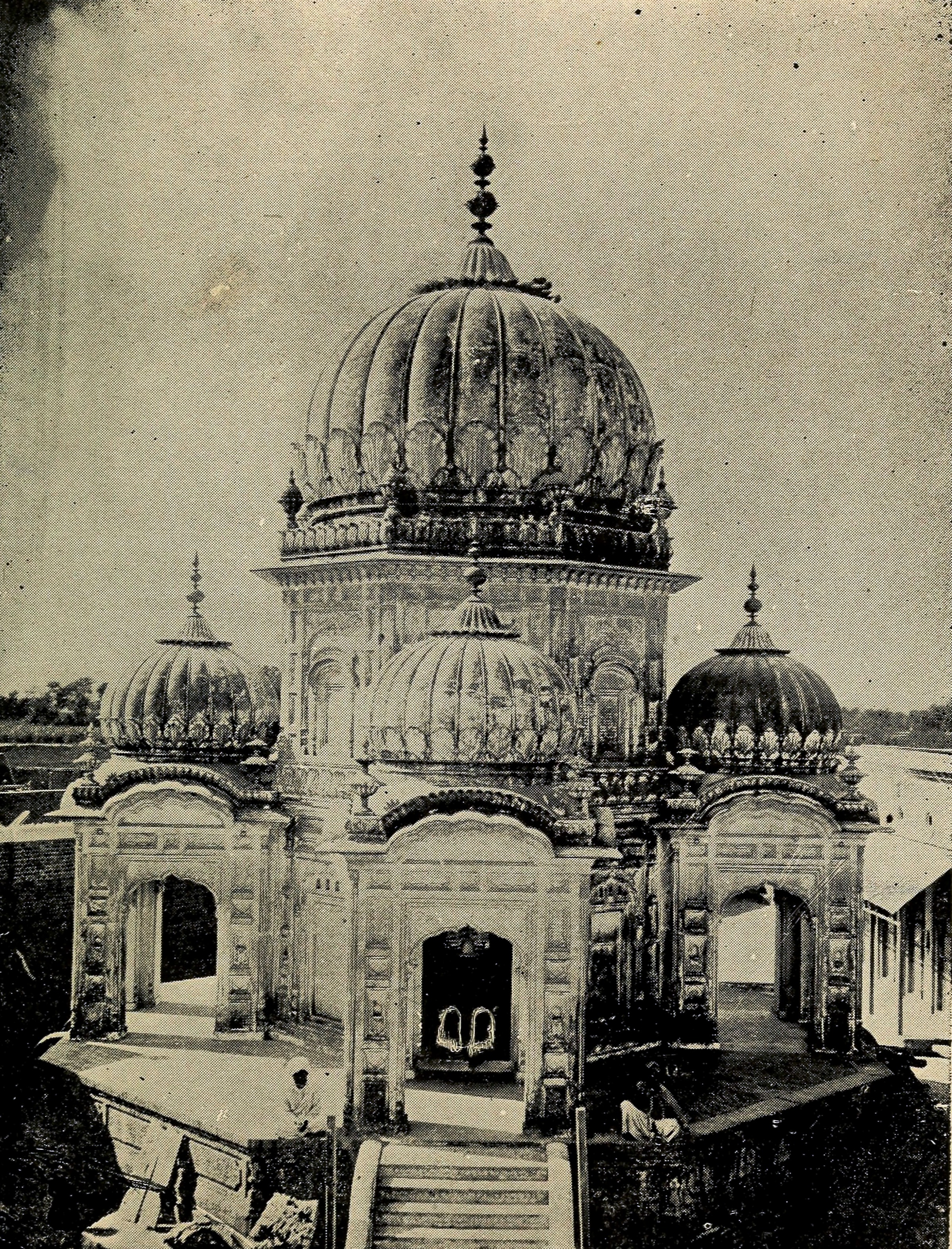
Memorial shrine of Vijayanandsuri in Gujranwala. Now used as a police station of Sabzi Mandi area.

The Adinatha temple in Lahore is in very poor-condition. In Multan, three Jain temples are traceable, two within Choori Saraey Bazaar near Bohar Gate within the old walled-city of Multan, the Parshvanath Jain Shwetambar temple and Digambar Jain temple, and another third temple is the Digambar temple in Multan Cantonment. A Jain temple in Multan is in good condition due to it now housing a madrasa which maintains it. A Jain temple located in Dera Ghazi Khan is architecturally a sister to the Parshvanath Jain Shwetambar temple in Multan, however most of its paintings have been white-washed by the current residents of the site. There is a samadhi dedicated to Atmaramji located off the Grand Trunk road in Sabzi Mandi, Gujranwala city, which also has an associated ghar mandir (small temple). There is also a samadhi dedicated to the Jain figure Jin Kushal Suraj in Derawar in Bahawalpur. A Jain temple at Farooqabad is in decent condition due to it being occurpied by a merchant. The Jain heritage of Tharkarpar fares better due to it being protected under an endowment trust fund. The temples of Bhodesar, Nagarparkar, and Virawah remain standing in comparatively better condition than other Jain temples in Pakistan. Gauri temple's frescoes require restoration as they are decaying and being vandalized. Other Jain temples' murals have been vandalized.

=== Restoration and research ===
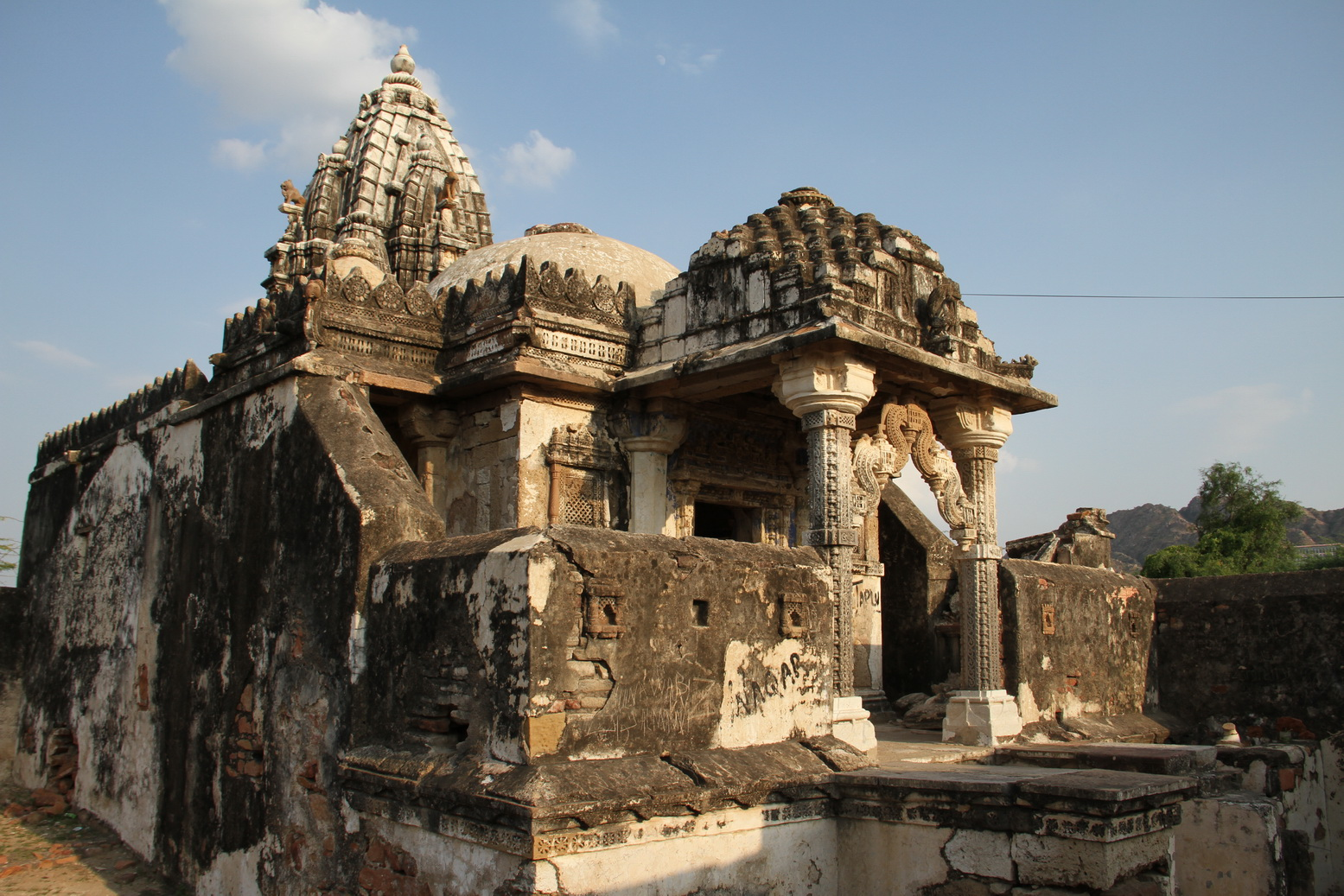
An ancient Jain temple at Nagarparkar

There are at-least forty extant Jain temples in Pakistan, with fourteen temples associated with the Nagarparkar Jain temple complex alone. However, the lack of a local Jain population means the temples are abandoned and in a dilapidated state. After the 1992 Babri Masjid incident, many Jain temples in Pakistan were vandalized and damaged by upset mobs. However, some Muslim locals saved the Jain temples from demolition during this time. According to historian Sam Dalrymple, there is a growing awareness of conserving Jain temples in Pakistan. In 2014, the Evacuee Trust Property Board was given the responsibility of renovating and restoring the former and current places of worship of religious minorities. The restoration of a Jain temple in Lahore began in 2021. Furthermore, the Atmaramji shrine in Gujranwala also underwent renovation, with the Parshvanath temple in Multan also slated for restoration. In 2022, the Evacuee Trust Property Board made plans to renovate and restore all forty known Jain temples located in the country. The Sindh endowment fund for heritage has been conserving Jain sites in its area. Meanwhile, the Department of Archeology of the University of the Punjab has been preparing artistic and architectural studies on Jain sites. A Sindhi court called for the protection and restoration of Jain sites in the Karoonjhar Hills. There have been suggestions to incoporate Jain sites into the religious tourism industry in Pakistan, especially in Sindh, such as by Ramesh Singh Arora.

A research survey by SOAS University of London and Nusrat Jahan College to map and document the remaining Jain heritage in Pakistan was carried out from 2015–2017 by Peter Flügel, Tahira Saeed, Mirza Naseer Ahmad, Muzaffar Ahmad, and Ahtesham Aziz Chaudhary. The study found ninety surviving Jain sites in Punjab, Sindh, and Khyber Pakhtunkhwa of both the Digambara and Śvetāmbara sects (temples, dādābāṛīs, sthānakas, samādhis, libraries, schools, hostels, and mohallās). The study classifies the remaining Jain temples into three groups: Śvetāmbara, Digambara, and Dādābāṛī temples. Some temples' sectoral affiliation was unable to be determined. The study gave the advice that control over the remaining Jain properties be transferred from the control of the Awqaf to the Department of Archaeology or to the Ministry of Culture to save them for posterity. They also recommended that written works in Devanagari and Gurumukhi scripts be catalogued to rediscover information useful to Jaina studies in the literary archives and collections in Pakistan. Another recommendation was that a Department of Jaina Studies be established a federally-run Pakistani university.

=== List of temples ===
==== Punjab ====
- Jain temple, Thari Bhabrian Lahore City.
- Jain Digambar Temple, Old Anarkali Jain Mandir Chawk: This temple was destroyed in the riots of 1992. an Islamic school was run from the former temple. 31.561389°N 74.308056°E. it was completely demolished in 2016, to make for construction of Lahore Metro and a Public Square.
- Parshvanath Jain Shwetambar temple, Multan
- Digambar Jain temple, Multan

==== Sindh ====
- Nagarparkar Jain temples, including the Gori temple
- Nagar Bazaar temple is present in the main bazar of the Nangar Parkar town. The structure of the temple, including the shikhar and the torana gateway is completely intact. It was apparently in use until the independence of Pakistan in 1947, and perhaps for some years even after that. There is also a ruined temple outside of the town.
- Bhodesar Jain mandir, 7.2 km from Nagar, was the region's capital during Sodha rule. Remains of three temples, are present. In 1897, two of them were being used as cattle stalls and the third had holes in the back. The oldest temple, was built in the classical style with stones without any mortar, built around 9th century. It is built on a high platform and reached by a series of steps carved into the rock. It has beautifully carved huge stone columns and other structural elements. The remaining walls are unstable and partially collapsed. Parts of the building had been dismantled by the locals who used the bricks to construct their homes. It is perhaps the most spectacular of the monuments in Sindh. The two other Jain temples are said to have been built in 1375 CE and 1449 CE built of kanjur and redstone, with fine carvings and corbelled domes.
- Karoonjar Jain mandir is at the base of the mountain.
- Virvah Jain mandir, are a number of ruins of Jain temples here. One of the temples had 27 devakulikas in it. The ruins of legendary Parinagar are nearby. One of the temples is in good preservation.
- Virvah Gori mandir is 14 miles from Viravah. The legendary temple with 52 subsidiary shrines was built in AD 1375–6. It is dedicated to Jain tirthankar Gori Parshvanatha.
- Jain Shwetamber Temple with Shikhar, Ranchore Line, Karachi
- Jain Shwetamber Temple, Hyderabad, Sindh

== Notable people ==
Prominent pre-partition Jains from or active in what is today Pakistan:

- Jinakuśalasūri
- Karmacand Bacchāvat
- Jinacandrasūri
- Loṅkāgaccha
- Yati Saravā
- Rāyamalla
- Bhallo
- Amarasiṃha
- Buddhivijaya
- Baba Dharam Dass
- Vijayānandasūri
- Vijayavallabhasūri
- Muni Khazāncan
- Ācārya Kāśīrām

== Gallery ==
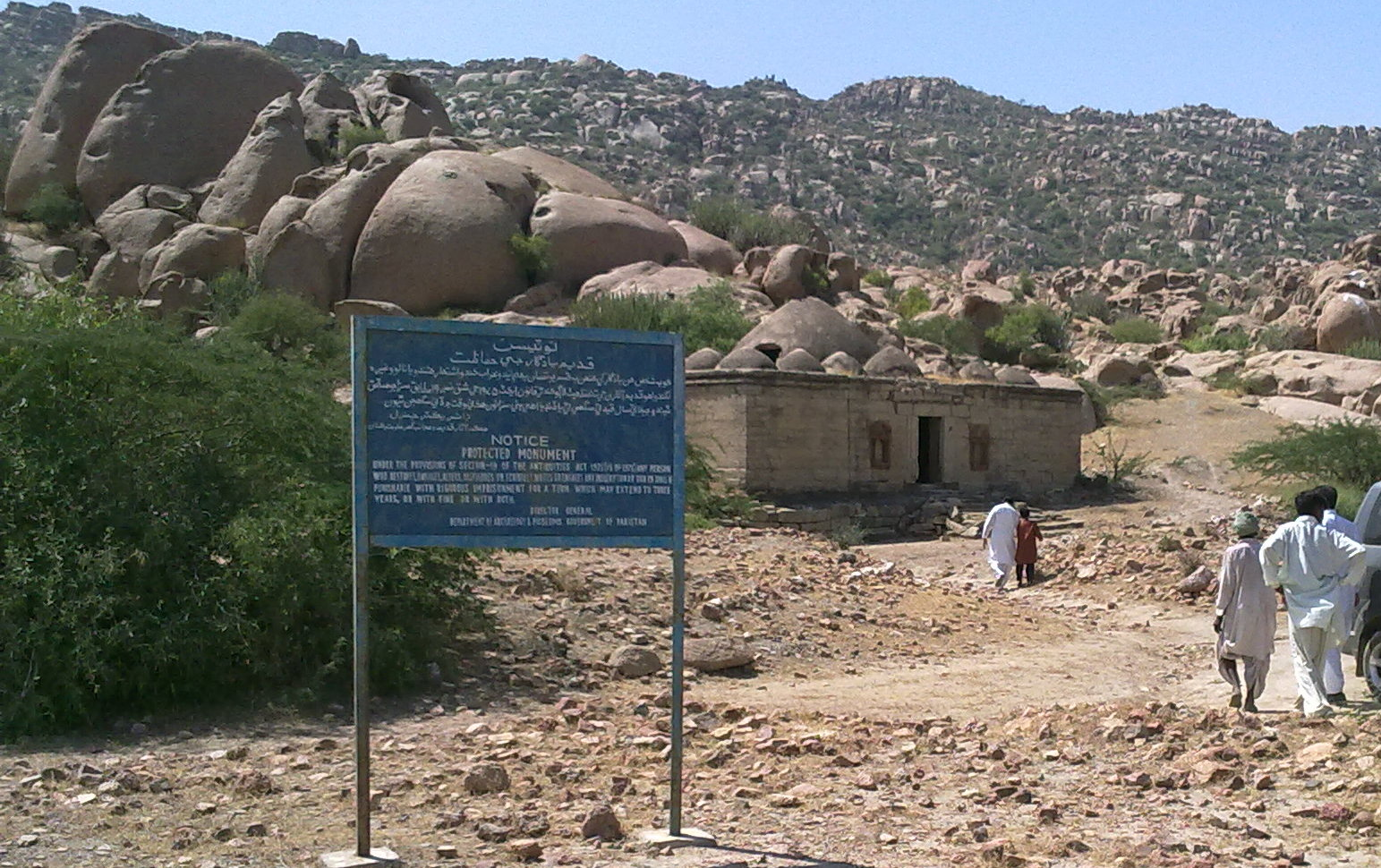
Ancient Jain temple located at the foot of Karoonjhar Mountains

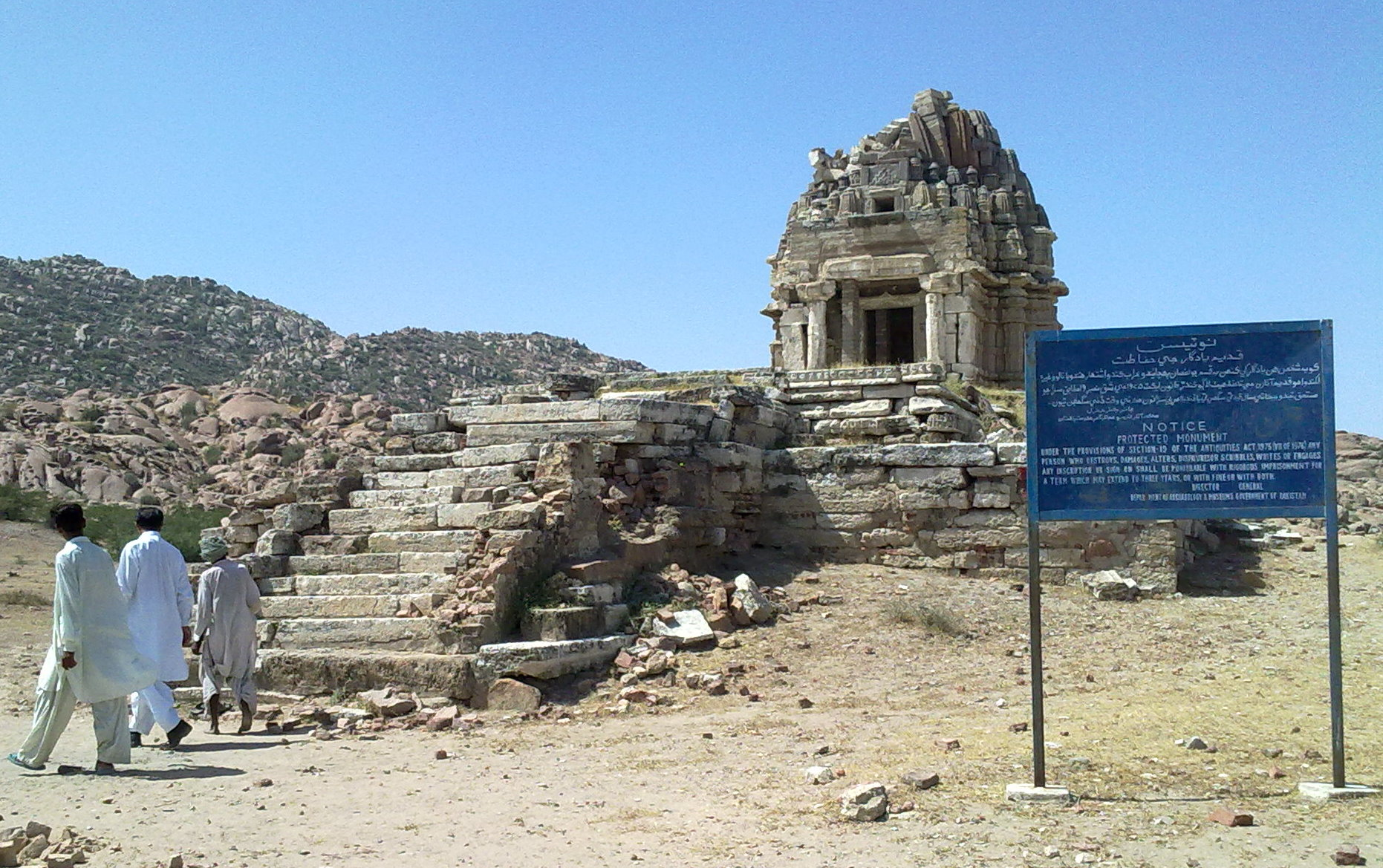
Jain Temple of Bhodesar

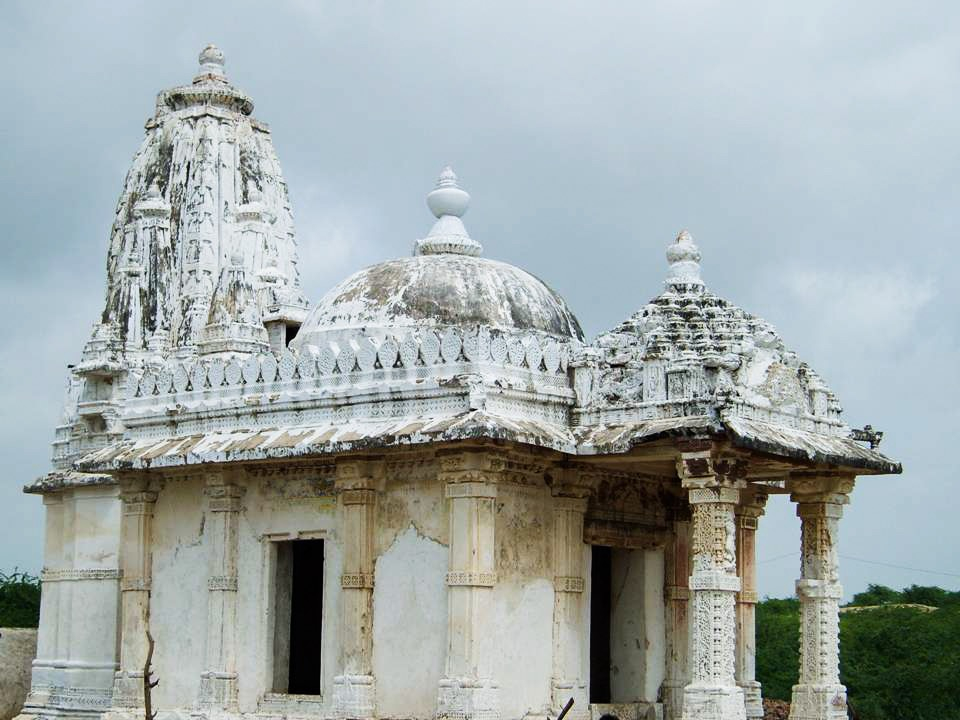
Virawah Jain Temple

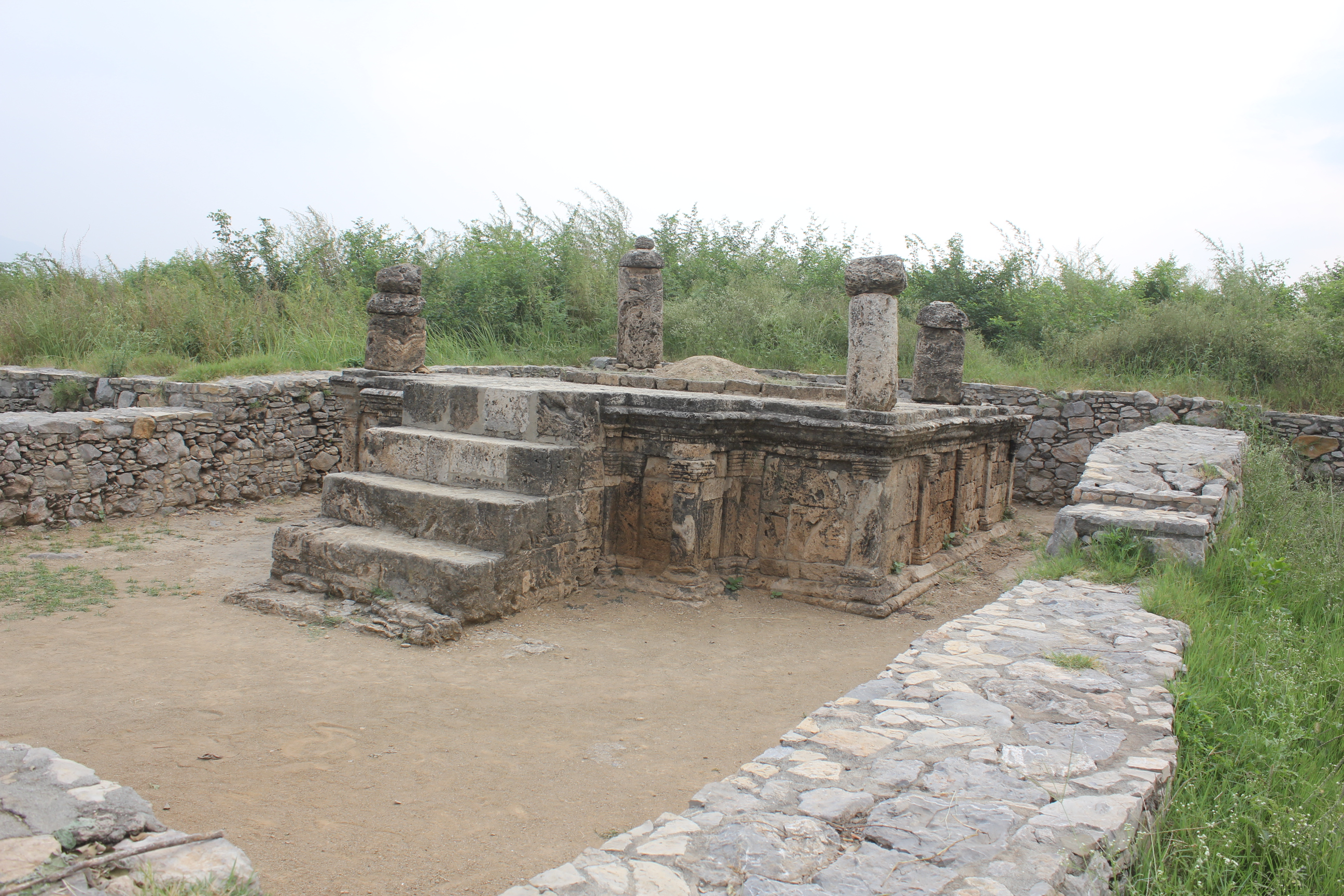
A Jain Stupa.

== See also ==
- Jainism in Punjab
- Hinduism in Pakistan
- Sikhism in Pakistan

== Sources ==
- Marshall, John (2013). A Guide to Taxila. Cambridge University Press. pp. 23–24. ISBN 9781107615441.
