= Parinagar =

Ancient port and settlement in Sindh, Pakistan

- Pari Nagar, Parinagarh
- Location within Sindh Location within Pakistan Location within South Asia
- 24°31′13″N 70°46′03″E
- Type: Settlement
- Cultures: Jain culture
- Location: Sindh, Pakistan

History
- Built: c. 500 BC

Site notes
- Condition: Ruined
- Owner: Public
- Public access: Yes

Parinagar (also spelled Pari Nagar or Parinagarh) is an abandoned historical port and settlement near the town of Virawah in Tharparkar District, Sindh, Pakistan, believed to have been established around the fifth century BCE, though some accounts place its founding as much as four centuries later. Remains of the port are visible in the nearby village of Dotar (also rendered Doo-ptar). The ruins are spread over a radius of four to five kilometres and consist of Jain temples, artefacts, and sculptures.

According to historical accounts and archaeological studies, the port at Parinagar was connected with the Maritime Silk Road. The settlement declined as geological changes pushed the sea further south, away from the port, leaving Parinagar landlocked. Together with the Nagarparkar Jain temples, it is considered part of the Nagarparkar Cultural Landscape, which is on the tentative list for UNESCO World Heritage status.

== Location ==
Parinagar lies in the Tharparkar desert in southeastern Sindh, near Virawah village, about 125 km southeast of Mithi, the nearest large town, and about 20 km from the border with India.

== Historical significance ==
At its peak, Parinagar was a prosperous port town with a population of around forty thousand. It functioned as an international port, through which trade was conducted with distant regions including Java and Sumatra. Traders exported grain, cotton, lac, and honey from Sindh, and imported cinnamon, cardamom, black pepper, and other spices in return.

The ruins extend for several kilometres and include temple remains, sculptures, and architectural fragments reflecting the town's former prosperity.

== Decline ==
Researchers have proposed several explanations for Parinagar's decline. One account holds that the town was attacked around 1223–1226 CE by forces led by Jalaluddin Mangburni (also known as Jalaluddin Khwarazm Shah), a Khwarazmian prince who had fled into Sindh; following the attack, the merchant class is said to have migrated to other areas. An alternative and long-standing local tradition attributes the port's destruction instead to an earthquake.

A separate, and not necessarily exclusive, explanation points to environmental change altering regional trade routes. Sedimentation in the Indus system and tectonic activity in the Rann of Kutch gradually transformed the area from a coastal maritime zone into landlocked, saline mudflats, rendering the port at Pari Nagar unusable and forcing its population to migrate elsewhere.

By the twentieth century, the site had largely fallen into ruin, though its remains continue to attract archaeologists, historians, and heritage researchers studying the cultural history of Sindh and the Jain diaspora.

== See also ==
- Jainism
- Jainism in Pakistan
