= Bhabra =

Jain caste found in Punjab

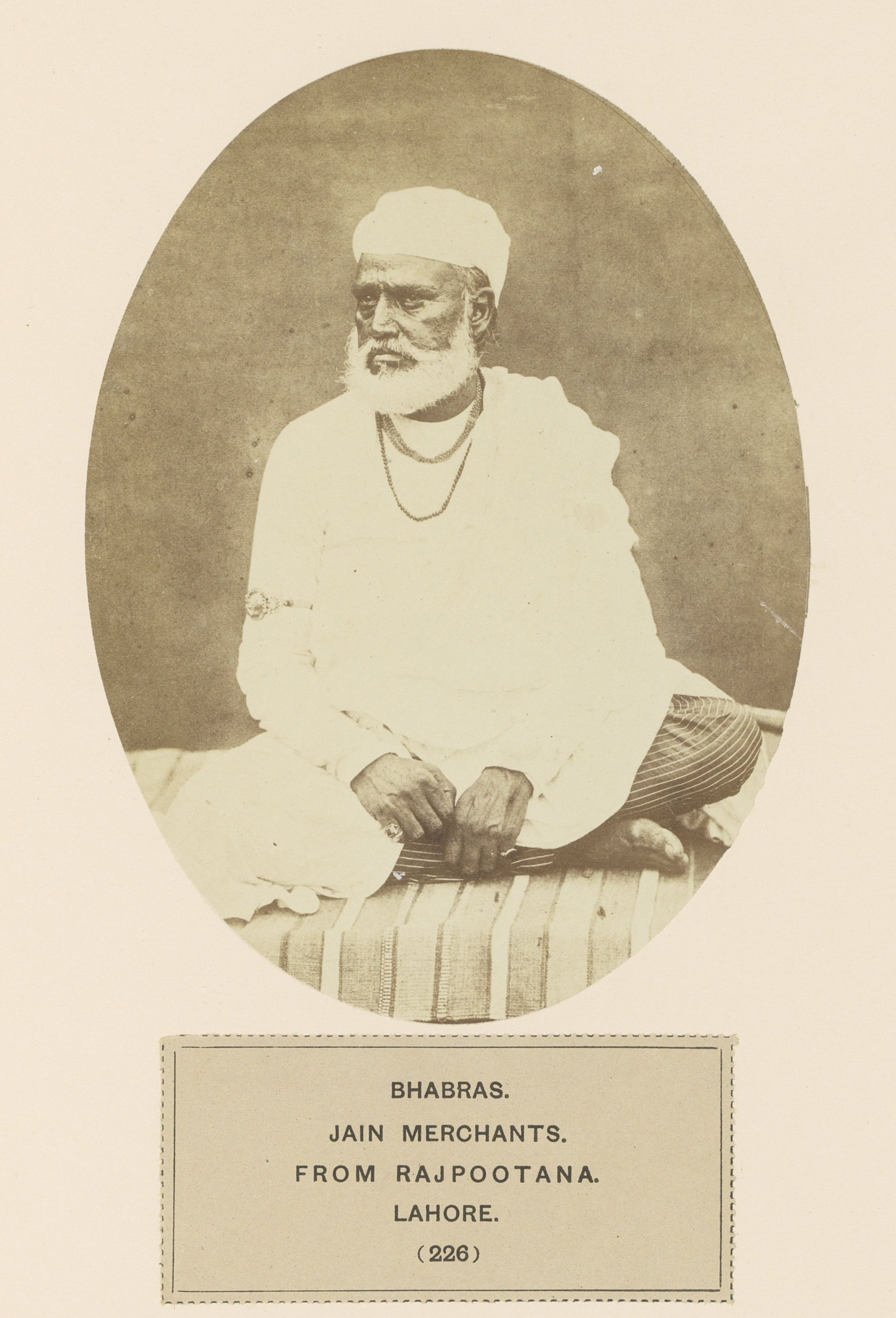
Portrait of an unknown Jain Bhabra merchant in Lahore, ca.1859–69

Bhabra or Bhabhra are a Jain community of Punjab.

== Name and origin ==
There are multiple theories regarding the origin of the Bhabra. According to Sumitta Bhikkhu (1949), the term derives from the compound word bhāva-baṛā (“great belief”). As per Duggaṛ (1979), the term originates from the name of a village south of Lahore called Bhāvaṛā/Bhabra (north-west of Kot Momin in present-day Punjab, Pakistan) where Karam Chand Bachhawat installed a foot-image (caraṇa-bimba) of Jinakuśalasūri, that was the local focus of the popular dādābāṛī cult. It is also believed to be connected with the Bhavadar or Bhavada gachchha to which the legendary Śvetāmbara Jain Acharya Kalakacharya belonged to. Inscriptions suggest that Bhavada Gachchha had survived until the 17th century.

== History ==
In western Punjab the Śvetāmbara Jains usually hailed from the Osavāla caste while in Sindh they usually belonged to the Poravāḍa and Śrīmālī castes. Despite the Punjabi Osavālas, who called themselves Bhābaṛās, having a Rajasthani origin, they gradually lost touch with their homeland and adopted Punjabi as their mother-tongue (also using Urdu and Persian) and stopped marrying Osavālas from Rajasthan. These Bhāvaṛā/Bhābaṛās were prevalent in mercantile, finance, education, and publishing fields. Apart from the Bhabras, other Jain castes/communities in Punjab were from Brahmin, Rajput, Aggarwal, Jatt, and lower-caste origin.

Vaar 8 Pauri 12 of 24 of Vaaran Bhai Gurdas (1550-1620 CE) says: "kaytarhiaan hee baaneeay kitarhay bhaabharhiaan suniaaray", there are many banias (traders) and many Bhabras are goldsmiths.

In "Romantic Tales from the Punjab" Charles Swynnerton relates a folk tale about several girls. It mentions a girl being a Bhabra, and mentions them being strictly vegetarian. In the 17th century, Fray Sebastien Manrique met them in Amritsar district. Their presence has also been noted in the Mughal period, and in the 19th century.

Many Bhabra Jains were converted to Sikhism by the preacher Naria of Jahman village in Lahore district.

The original home region of the Bhabras is now in Pakistan where a small community still exists. The organizations of the Bhabras controlled most of the Jain heritage sites in present-day Pakistan prior to the partition of India. Most of the Bhabras left Pakistan in 1947 for India, pre-partition many cities had locations (such as villages, bazaars, and mohallas) associated with the Bhabras.

- Sialkot: All the Jains here were Bhabra and mainly lived in Sialkot and Pasrur. The Serai Bhabrian and Bhabrian Wala localities are named after them. There were several Jain temples here before the partition of India.
- Pasrur: Pasrur was developed by a Jain zamindar who was granted land by Raja Maan Singh. Baba Dharam Dass belonged to the zamindar family who was murdered on a trading visit.
- Gujranwala: Two old Jain libraries managed by Lala Karam Chand Bhabra were present here which were visited by Ramkrishna Gopal Bhandarkar.
- Lahore: There were Jain temples at localities still called Thari Bhabrian and Gali Bhabrian.
- Rawalpindi: Bhabra Bazar is named after them.

After partition, most of the displaced Bhabra families were resettled in Ludhiana and Ambala. In Delhi, majority of the Jains in the neighborhood of Roop Nagar have their origins in western Punjab.

In India places named after them include:

- Amritsar: Kucha Bhabrian, Katra Bhabrian
- Hansi: Mohalla Bhabran
