= Parshvanath Jain Shwetambar temple, Multan =

Jain temple in Multan, Pakistan

Shiri Vishwanath Jain Shwetambar Mandir
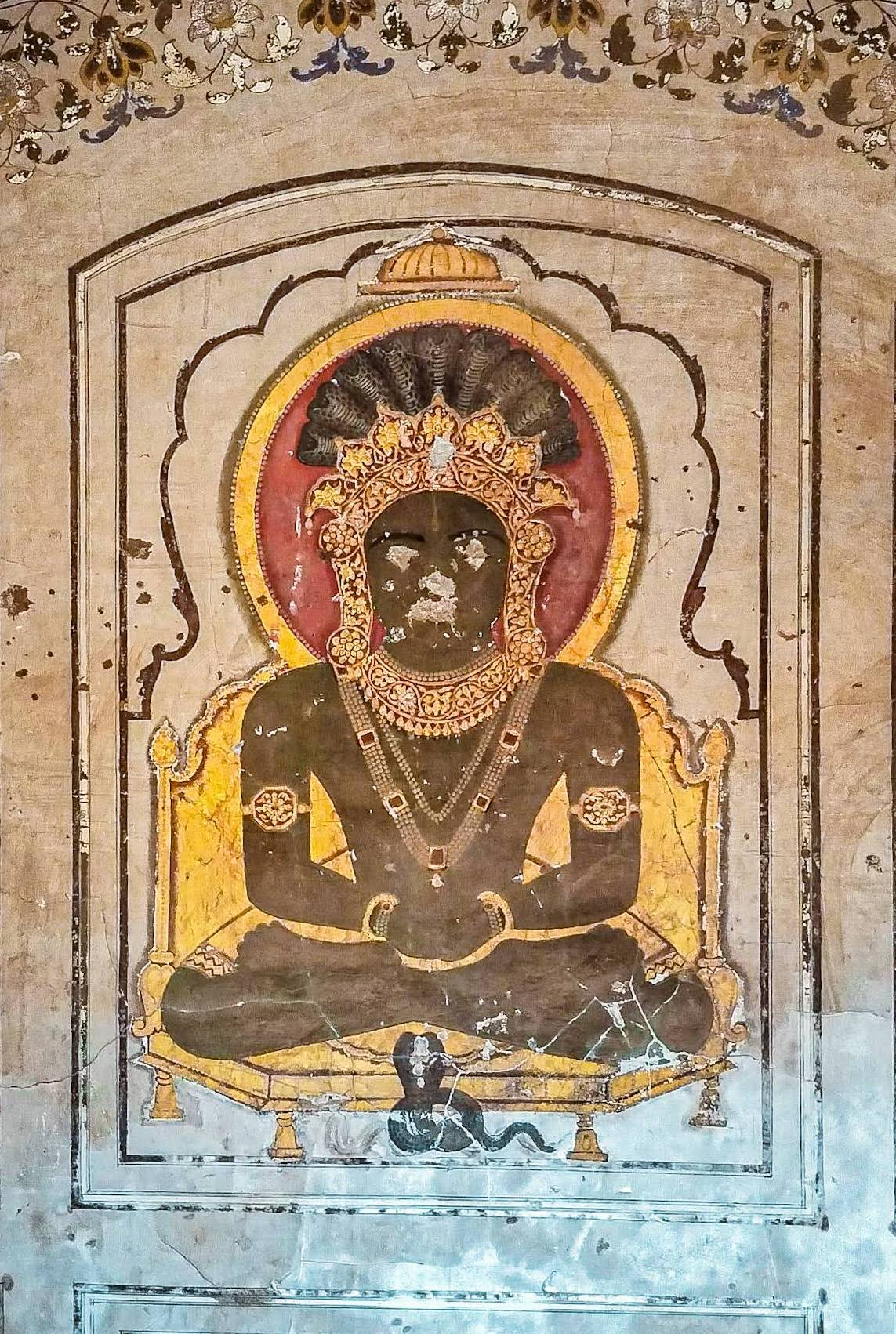
- Mural depicting the 23rd Tirthankar from Parshvanath Jain Shwetambar temple in Multan, Punjab, circa early 19th century

Religion
- Affiliation: Jainism
- Sect: Śvetāmbara
- Deity: Pārśvanātha
- Ownership: Evacuee Trust Property Board
- Status: Defunct

Location
- Location: Churi Sarai Bazaar, Multan, Punjab, Pakistan

Architecture
- Style: Jain (with Mughal and Sikh influences)
- Established: early 19th century (c. 1819)

Parshvanath Jain Shwetambar temple is a Jain temple located in the Churi Sarai Bazaar area of Bohar Gate, Multan in Punjab, Pakistan. The temple is a Parshvanath temple associated with the Śvetāmbara sect originally constructed in the early 19th century. The Digambar Jain temple is located in the same locality near Bohar Gate within the old walled-city of Multan.

== History ==
Historian Sam Dalrymple dates the temple's construction to a year after the Sikh conquest of Multan, which gives a year of c. 1819. He attributes its sponsor as being the Nahata family, who served as court-jewellers to the Nawabs of Bahawalpur and Khans of Kalat. However, Asif Mahmood Rana dates it later to the British period. Multan was 0.04% Jain in 1941 but these Jains left for India during partition.

The temple was vandalized and damaged by a mob in December 1992 the aftermath of the 1992 Babri Masjid demolition. However, it was mostly spared due to the intercession of a maulvi and his students, who protected the temple. Part of the complex currently serves as an Islamic school. Muslim students clean the temple daily, including the frescoes of Jain deities.

The property is currently owned by the Evacuee Trust Property Board and has no official protection status conferred onto it. A restoration of the structure led by a member of the Nahata family under the guise of the Evacuee Trust Property Board is planned.

== Architecture and artwork ==
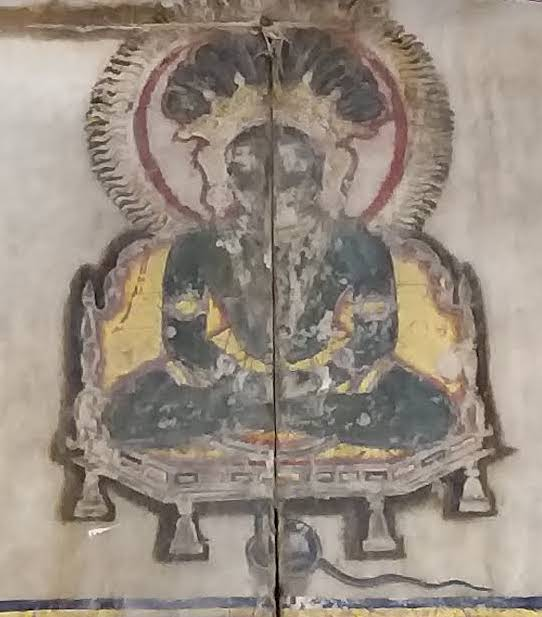
23rd Tirthankar, detail from a mural depicting five Tirthankars from Parshvanath Jain Shwetambar temple in Multan, Punjab, circa early 19th century

The structure has three-stories and a basement. Its bazaar level is occupied by shops. Its architecture shows both Mughal and Sikh influences. Within the building are frescoes depicting the twenty-four tirthankaras of Jainism.

== See also ==
- Digambar Jain temple, Multan
