= Shyama (Jain monk) =

Personal life
- Born: c. 247 BC
- Died: c. 151 BC

Religious life
- Religion: Jainism

Shyamacharya or Kalakacharya I (c.247 BC - 151 BC) was a Jain monk.

== Life ==
Shyamacharya or Kalakacharya I lived from c. 247 BC to 151 BC. He composed Prajnapaana Sutra, an encyclopaedia of Jain tenets.

== Sources ==
- Shah, Natubhai (2004) [First published in 1998], Jainism: The World of Conquerors, vol. I, Motilal Banarsidass, ISBN 81-208-1938-1
