= Digambar Jain temple, Multan =

Jain temple in Multan, Pakistan

Religion
- Affiliation: Jainism
- Sect: Digambara
- Deity: Adinath

Location
- Location: Multan, Punjab, Pakistan

Architecture
- Completed: Victorian era

Digambar Jain temple is a Jain temple located in Bohar Gate, Multan, Punjab, Pakistan. The temple is dedicated to the first tirthankar of Jainism, Adinath. According to Sam Dalrymple, the temple dates to the Victorian period and its construction was sponsored by the Nahata family. Its murtis were shifted to the Multan Digambar temple in Jaipur after partition. The temple is currently abandoned. Located in the same locality as this temple is the Shri Parsvanatha Svetambara Jain Mandir.

== See also ==
- Parshvanath Jain Shwetambar temple, Multan
