= Historical ports =

Aspect of maritime history

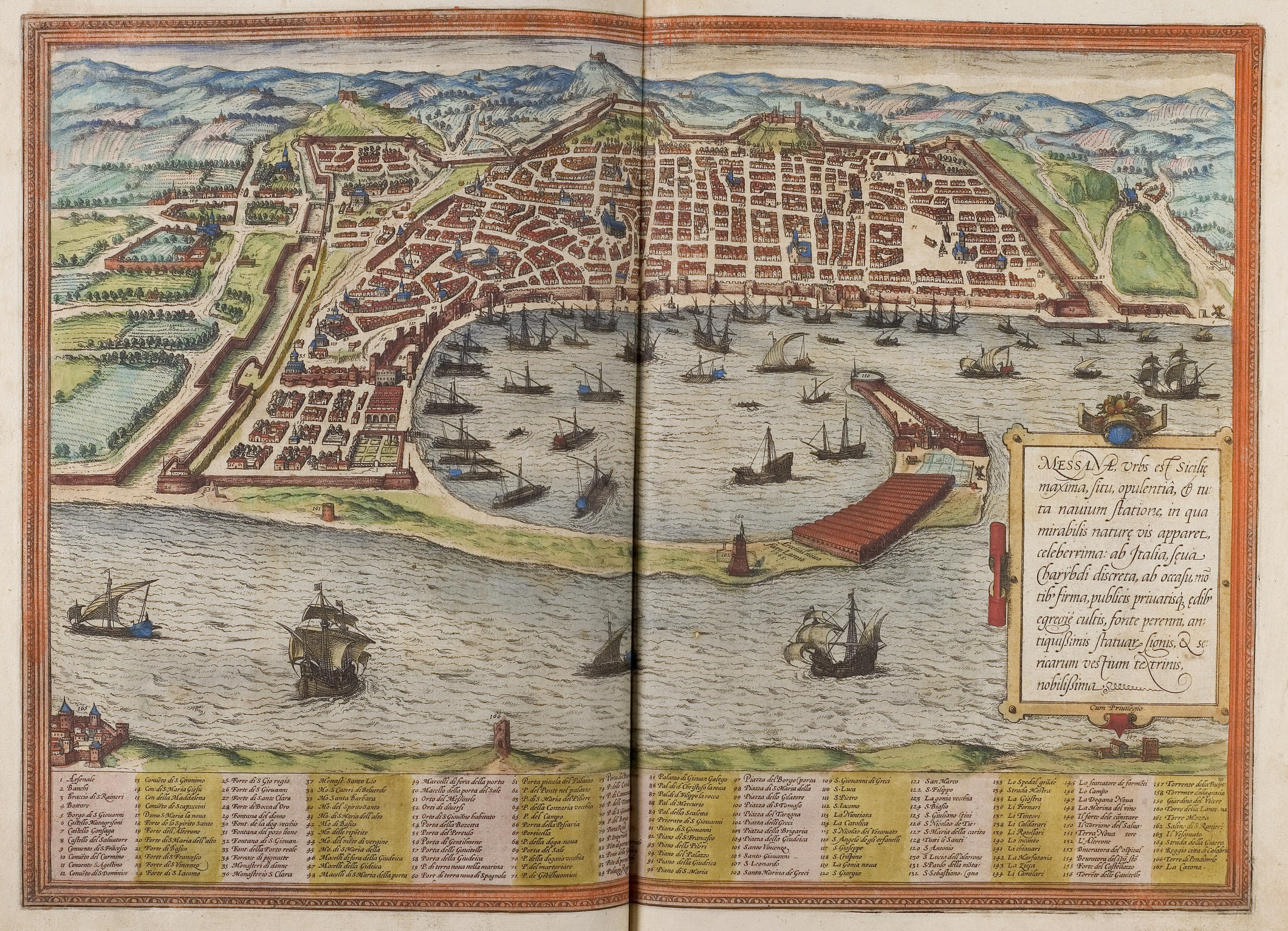
The port of Messina in Sicily (from book published circa 1572).

Historical ports may be found where ancient civilizations have developed maritime trade.

One of the world's oldest known artificial harbors is at Wadi al-Jarf on the Red Sea. Along with the findings of harbor structures, ancient anchors have also been found.

== Ancient Tunisia (Phonecia) ==
The cothon port of Carthage is possibly the most famous historical port in the world, as it's inner circular military harbour resembles the port at Atlantis as described in the writings of Plato. Several ports in the Mediterranean were cothons, including Motya in Sicily and Kition in Cyprus.

== Ancient China ==
Guangzhou was an important port during ancient times as far back as the Qin dynasty.

== Ancient Egypt ==
Canopus was the principal port in Egypt for Greek trade before the foundation of Alexandria.

== Ancient Greece ==
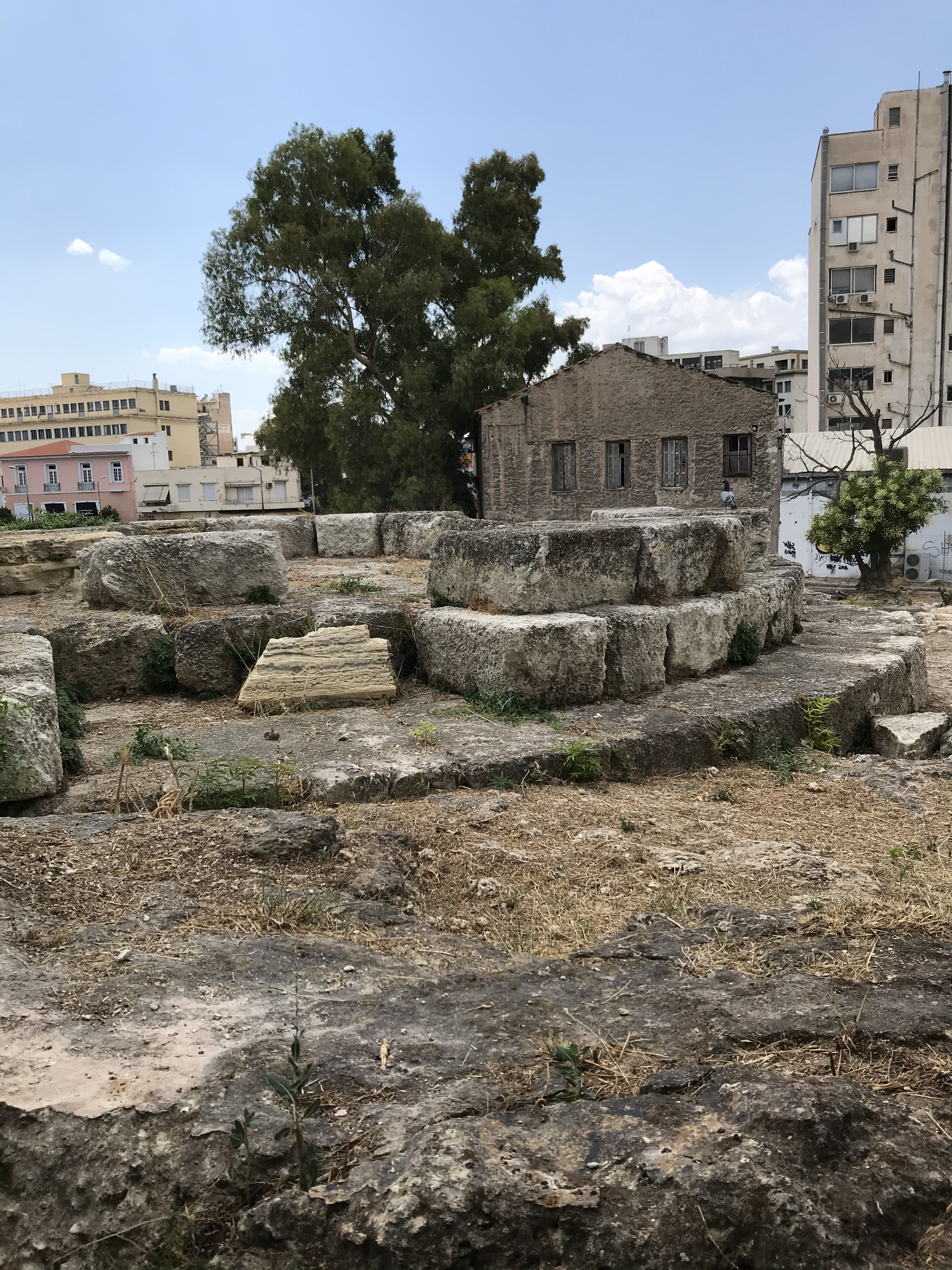
Remains of the ancient port of Piraeus, Greece

The port of Piraeus was the base for the Athenian fleet and this played a crucial role in the Battle of Salamis against the Achaemenid Empire in 480 BC.

== Ancient India ==
Lothal is one of the most prominent cities of the ancient Indus valley civilisation, located in the Bhāl region of the modern state of Gujarat, India. Lothal was one of the southern most cities of the Indus Valley Civilisation. The port was constructed around 2200 BCE and is believed to be world's earliest known dock. Port of Chittagong (located in present-day Bangladesh) has been a recorded seaport since the 4th century BCE. In the 2nd century, the harbor appeared on Ptolemy's map, drawn by the Claudius Ptolemy. The map mentions the harbor as one of the finest in the Eastern world. The Periplus of the Erythraean Sea documents trade between Chittagong and private merchants from Roman Egypt. Muziris was an ancient seaport and urban center on the Malabar Coast (in modern-day Kerala, India), active from at least the 1st century BCE. It was one of the key hubs of the Spice trade in the Indian Ocean, facilitating direct commerce between ancient South India and the Greco-Roman world, Egypt, and China. Mentioned alongside other ancient ports in the Periplus of the Erythraean Sea and Pliny the Elder's Naturalis Historia, Muziris was celebrated in Sangam literature as Muchiri, where Roman ships arrived bearing gold in exchange for black pepper. It is also marked on the 4th-century Roman map Tabula Peutingeriana with a temple dedicated to Augustus.

== Ancient Rome ==
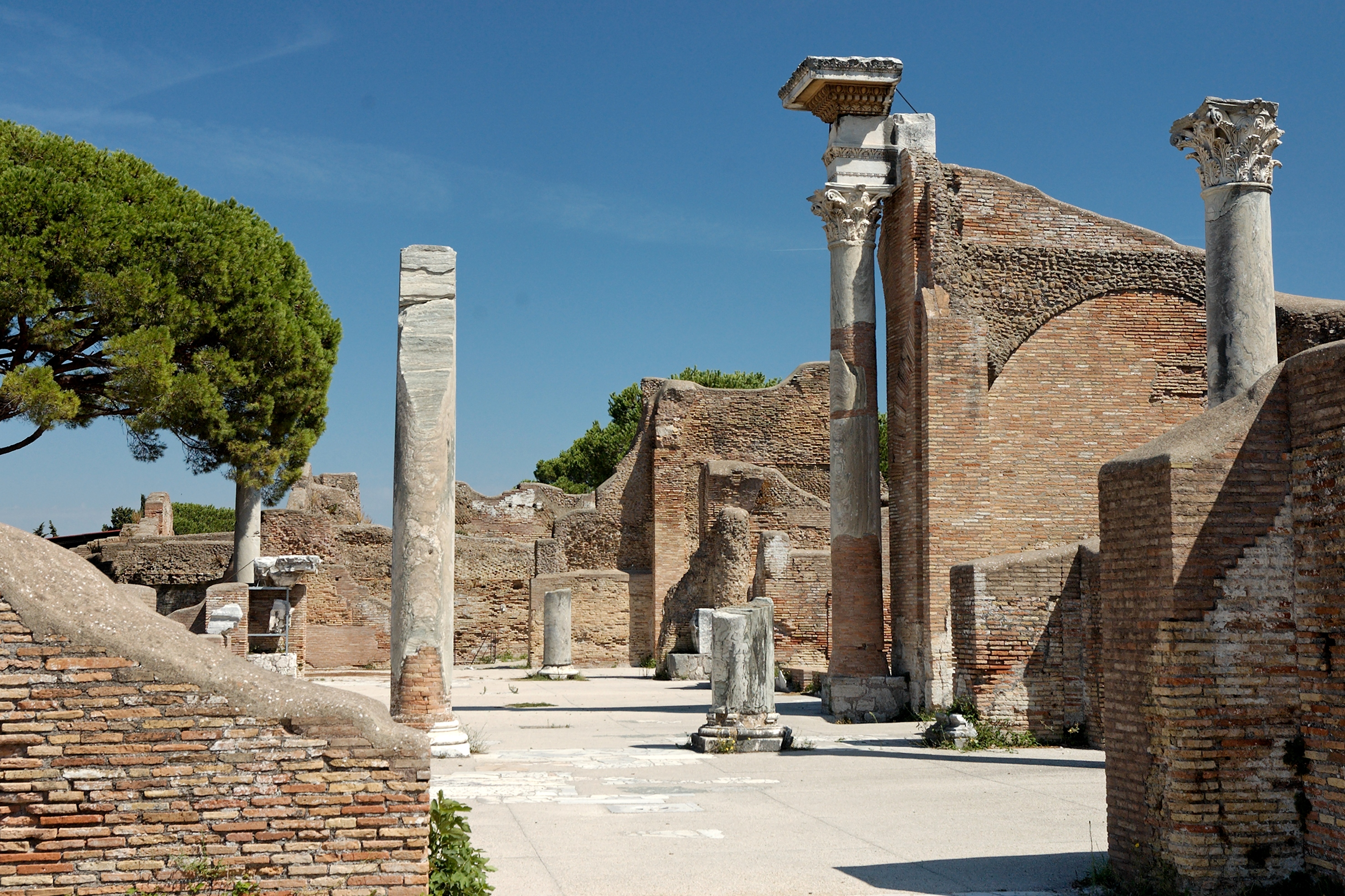
Remains of the Port of Ostia Antica, Italy

Ostia Antica was the port of ancient Rome with Portus established by Claudius and enlarged by Trajan to supplement the nearby Port of Ostia.

Messina, sited on the Strait of Messina, also has a history as an ancient port.

== East Africa ==
In East Africa, Post-classical Swahili kingdoms are known to have had trade port islands and trade routes with the Islamic world and Asia. They were described by Greek historians as "metropolises". Famous East African trade ports such as Mombasa, Zanzibar, Mogadishu, Adulis and Kilwa were known to Chinese sailors such as Zheng He and medieval Islamic historians such as the Berber Islamic voyager Abu Abdullah ibn Battuta.

== Japan ==
During the Edo period, the island of Dejima was the only port open for trade with Europe and only received the Portuguese and Dutch traders, due to their historical relations, whereas Osaka was the largest domestic port and the main trade hub for rice.

== Medieval Italy ==
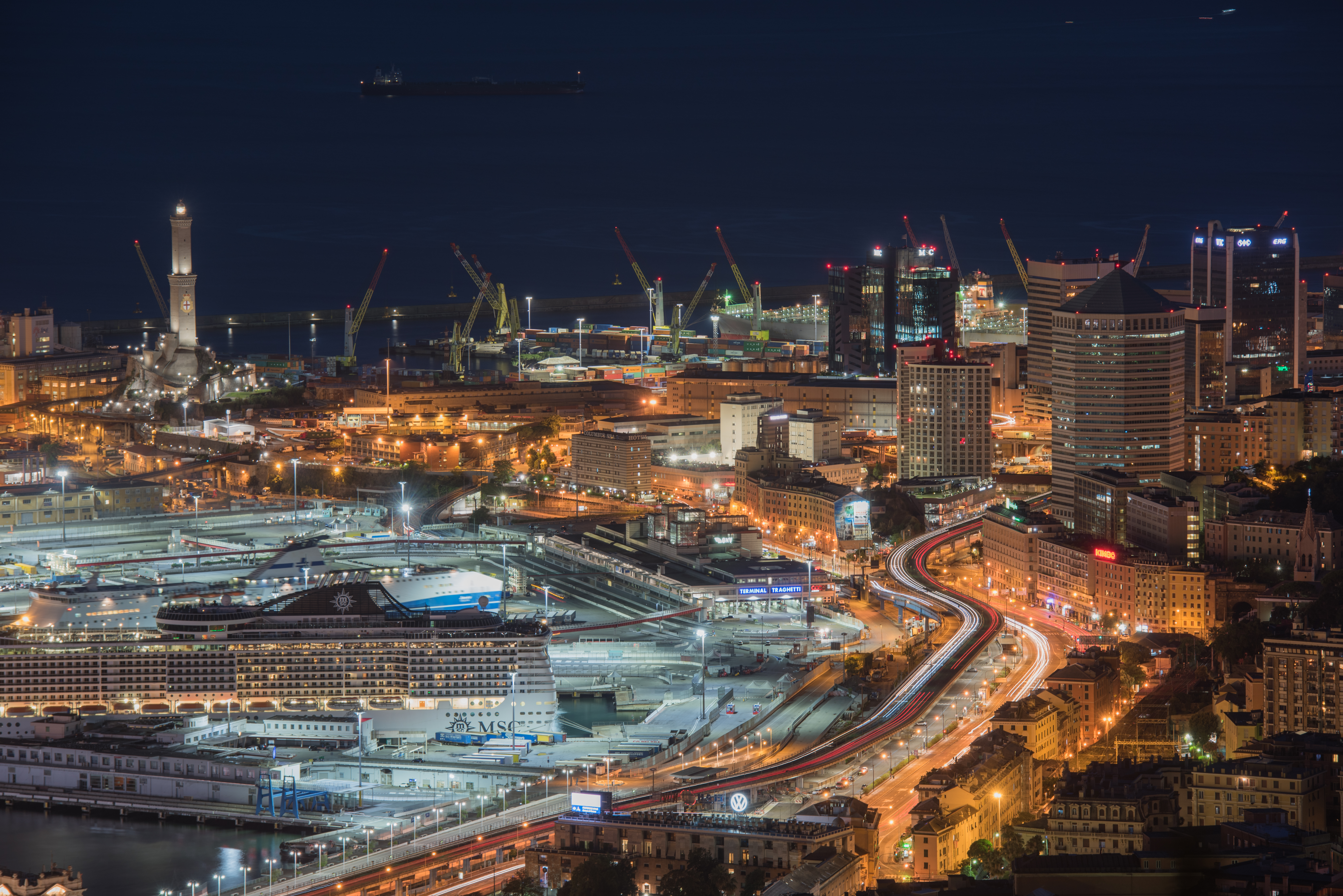
The ancient Port of Genoa, Italy

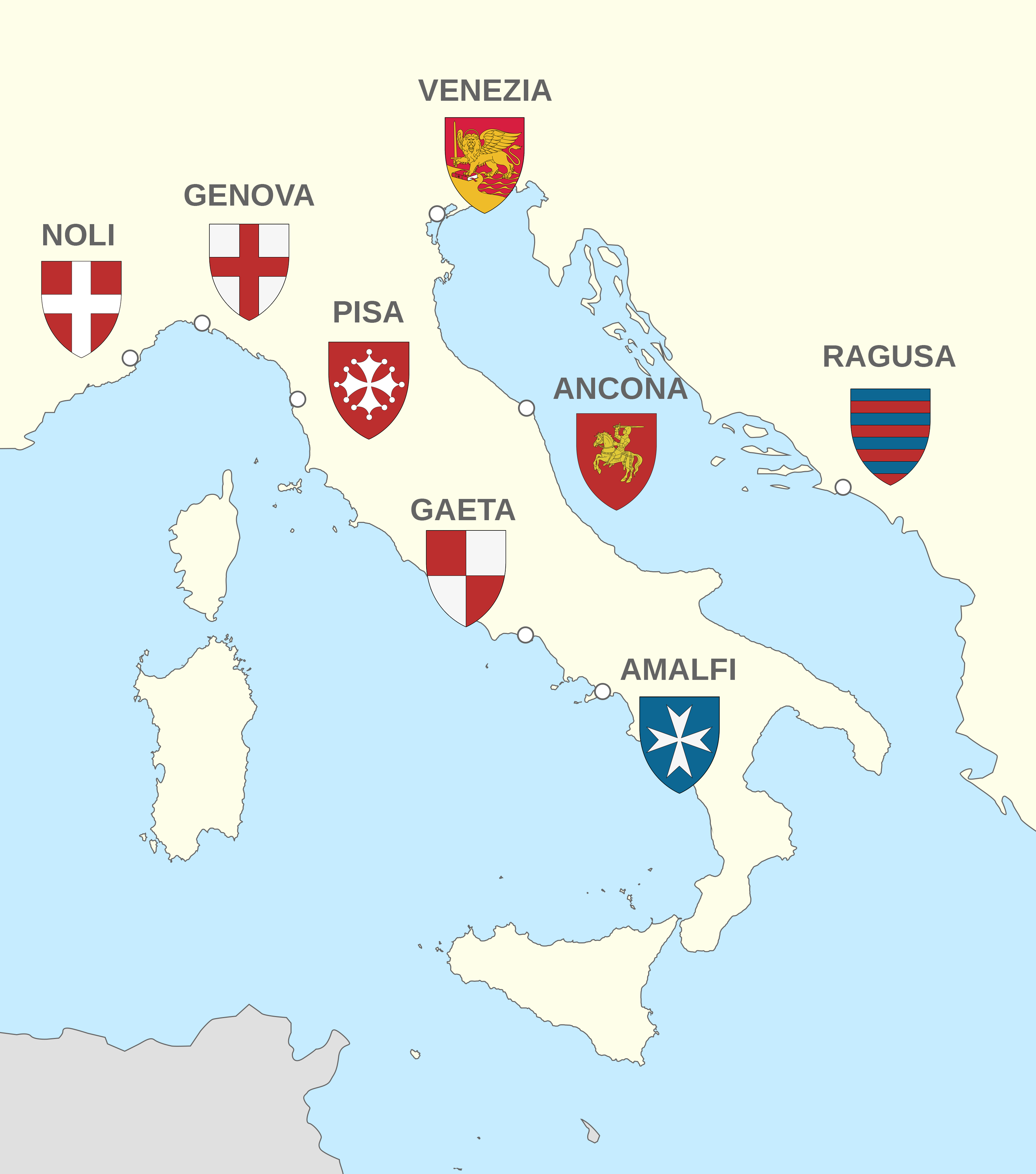
A map with the locations and coats of arms of the maritime republics of medieval Italy: Amalfi, Genoa, Pisa, and Venice, Noli, Ancona, Ragusa, Gaeta.

The maritime republics (Italian: repubbliche marinare), also called merchant republics (Italian: repubbliche mercantili), were Italian thalassocratic port cities which, starting from the Middle Ages, enjoyed political autonomy and economic prosperity brought about by their maritime activities. The term, coined during the 19th century, generally refers to four Italian cities, whose coats of arms have been shown since 1947 on the flags of the Italian Navy and the Italian Merchant Navy: Amalfi, Genoa, Pisa, and Venice. In addition to the four best known cities, Ancona, Gaeta, Noli, and, in Dalmatia, Ragusa, are also considered maritime republics; in certain historical periods, they had no secondary importance compared to some of the better known cities.

Uniformly scattered across the Italian peninsula, the maritime republics were important not only for the history of navigation and commerce: in addition to precious goods otherwise unobtainable in Europe, new artistic ideas and news concerning distant countries also spread. From the 10th century, they built fleets of ships both for their own protection and to support extensive trade networks across the Mediterranean, giving them an essential role in reestablishing contacts between Europe, Asia, and Africa, which had been interrupted during the early Middle Ages. They also had an essential role in the Crusades and produced renowned explorers and navigators such as Marco Polo and Christopher Columbus.

Over the centuries, the maritime republics — both the best known and the lesser known but not always less important — experienced fluctuating fortunes. In the 9th and 10th centuries, this phenomenon began with Amalfi and Gaeta, which soon reached their heyday. Meanwhile, Venice began its gradual ascent, while the other cities were still experiencing the long gestation that would lead them to their autonomy and to follow up on their seafaring vocation. After the 11th century, Amalfi and Gaeta declined rapidly, while Genoa and Venice became the most powerful republics. Pisa followed and experienced its most flourishing period in the 13th century, and Ancona and Ragusa allied to resist Venetian power. Following the 14th century, while Pisa declined to the point of losing its autonomy, Venice and Genoa continued to dominate navigation, followed by Ragusa and Ancona, which experienced their golden age in the 15th century. In the 16th century, with Ancona's loss of autonomy, only the republics of Venice, Genoa, and Ragusa remained, which still experienced great moments of splendor until the mid-17th century, followed by over a century of slow decline that ended with the Napoleonic invasion.

== See also ==
- Ports
- Ancient history
