= Baba Dharam Dass =

Holy man in 16–17th-century India

Baba Dharam Dass was a Jain holy man in Punjab during the reign of the Mughal emperor Akbar.

== Biography ==
Dharam Dass may have been a descendant of the original Oshowal Jain zamindars invited by Man Singh to settle in the Pasrur region. As per lore, Dharam Dass was a pious Jain from Pasrur who sold clothing bundles on horseback to take it to market in neighbouring areas. However, one day Dharam Dass' horse came back without him and it was assumed he was murdered and cremated him in a field. As per Madan Lal Jain, Dharam Dass died around 300 years ago.

== Shrines ==
A samadhi shrine was built dedicated to him on the outskirts of Pasrur, Punjab, which is now in ruins. It was one of the most sacred Jain sites in Pakistan. The shrine may be located near Gurdwara Manji Sahib in Deoka/Degh, Pasrur.

In the 1980s, some Indians visited the shrine to take some bricks to make replica shrines in India. Two shrines in India dedicated to him that are replicas of the original shrine in Pasrur are located in Meerut and Ludhiana. The Duggar lineage of Oswal Jains claim Dharam Dass as an ancestor worship him. When a male member of the Pasrur Jain community reaches the age of five, the mundan ceremony is performed at a shrine of Dharam Dass.

== See also ==
- Jainism in Punjab
