= Pamwal Das Shiv Mandir =

Hindu temple in Pakistan

- Location within Karachi Pamwal Das Shiv Mandir (Pakistan) Pamwal Das Shiv Mandir (Asia)

Religion
- Affiliation: Hinduism
- District: Karachi
- Deity: Shiva

Location
- Location: Soldier Bazaar
- State: Sindh
- Country: Pakistan
- Interactive map of Pamwal Das Shiv Mandir
- Coordinates: 24°51′23.5″N 66°59′52.8″E

Architecture
- Type: Hindu temple architecture

Pamwal Das Shiv Mandir at Pawaldass compound at Kakri Ground in Baghdadi area of Lyari Town. According to the Human Rights Commission of Pakistan and The News International, Muslim clerics have illegally turned this centuries-old historic temple into a Muslim pir and slaughterhouse for cows with the help of Baghdadi police after making series of attacks on Hindu families living in the area.

== See also ==
- Hinduism in Pakistan
- Swaminarayan
- Swaminarayan Sampraday
- Shri Varun Dev Mandir
- Evacuee Trust Property Board
- Pakistan Hindu Council
- Hinglaj Mata
- Kalat Kali Temple
- Katasraj temple
- Multan Sun Temple
- Prahladpuri Temple, Multan
- Sadh Belo
- Shiv Mandir, Umerkot
- Tilla Jogian
