= Evacuee Trust Property Board =

Pakistan Government Statutory Board

Evacuee Trust Property Board (ETPB), Pakistan
- State emblem of Pakistan

Agency overview
- Formed: 1960
- Jurisdiction: Government of Pakistan
- Headquarters: 9 Court Street, Lahore 54000, Punjab, Pakistan; 31.5546°N 74.3572°E
- Agency executive: Aamer Ahmed, Chairman
- Website: https://www.etpb.gov.pk/

The Evacuee Trust Property Board, (Urdu: متروکہ وقف املاک هیئت) a statutory board of the Government of Pakistan, is a key government department which administers evacuee properties, including educational, charitable or religious trusts left behind by Hindus and Sikhs who migrated to India after partition. It also maintains places of worship belonging to Hindus and Sikhs in Pakistan.

The Pakistan Hindu Mandir Management Committee and Pakistan Sikh Gurdwara Prabandhak Committee are bodies under it formed for the maintenance of the temples and gurudwaras respectively under ETPB.

== Members ==
The board has 6 official and 18 non-official members. In 2020, six of the official members are Muslims and of the total of the 18 non-official members, only eight are from the minority Hindu and Sikh communities.

== History ==
The Evacuee Trust Property Board was established in 1960 to look after the temples and land left over by Sikhs (gurdwaras), Hindus (mandirs), and Jains (derasars/mandirs) who migrated to India during partition in 1947 and 1948. The board functions under the Act (Management & Disposal) No. XIII of 1975. The board was started as a result of Nehru-Liaqat Pact in 1950 and Pant Mirza Agreement in 1955 to guarantee the rights of the minority Hindus and Sikhs.

After partition occurred, Muslim refugees were settled in former Hindu, Sikh, and Jain buildings in the newly formed Pakistan. This was only intended to be a temporary measure and it was originally planned that the refugee residents would vacate the properties once their rehabilitation had been arranged so that the ETPB could preserve and maintain the former places of worship. However, instead many structures continued to be inhabited by families of refugee-origin, sometimes across many generations. Essentially, former places of worship of the religious minorities became homes for Muslim refugees. In Gujranwala for example, some of these families have split from one another, leading them to make physical alterations to the former religious sites they inhabit by barricading off sections to divide them across different sections of the family. Many former sites belong to the religious minorities are now dilapidated or been demolished.

== Properties ==
There are over 1,130 Hindu temples and 517 gurdwaras in Pakistan. The board controls and manages 109,404 acres of agricultural land and 46,499 acres of built-up urban sub-units in accordance with “Scheme for the Lease of Evacuee Trust Agricultural Land, 1975” and “Schemes for the Management and Disposal of Urban Evacuee Trust Properties, 1977. (Evacuee Trust Properties essentially are the properties attached to charitable, religious or educational trust or institutions.)

=== Healthcare ===
The board runs the Janki Devi Jamiat Singh Hospital and seven health centers.

=== Educational Institutes ===
The following educational institutions are functioning and imparting free education to minorities:

- Hazrat Ayesha Sadiqa Degree College Lahore
- Dr. Mateen Fatima Trust model School
- Trust Model Public High School

== Corruption ==
In 2011, Pakistani Sikh Gulab Singh filed a case against Asif Hashmi, chairman of the board, claiming he was selling gurdwara property illegally to property developers. In December 2017, during the hearing of a case on Katas Raj Temple in Chakwal, the Chief Justice of Pakistan, Mian Saqib Nisar, expressed displeasure at the absence or displacing of idols from the temples, demanding to know why there were no statues in the temples of Shiri Ram and Hanuman. The bench was told that Asif Hashmi, a former chairman of Evacuee Trust Property Board, earned millions of rupees from corruption [during his tenure] and then left [Pakistan]. The chairman of the board, at that time, Mr. Saddique, also highlighted his "fight against corruption" [within the board] in his message on the board's website.

== Criticism ==
=== No minority representation ===
The ETP board is often criticised for not having enough Hindu and Sikh members on the board. During the signing of Liaqat-Nehru pact, both Pakistan and India agreed to appoint a Muslim head in India and a Hindu head in Pakistan to look after evacuee property. However, since independence, the Pakistan government never appointed a Hindu citizen as chairman. In 2020, all six official members are Muslims and of the 18 non-official members, only eight are from the minority Hindu and Sikh communities. In 2018, Ramesh Kumar Vankwani, Hindu member of the national assembly, presented the Evacuee Trust Properties (Management and Disposal) Bill 2018 which says that only a Hindu or Sikh should be appointed as the chairperson of the Evacuee Trust Property Board. However, the bill was rejected by the assembly's standing committee on religious affairs in 2019.

=== Leasing Hindu Temples ===
The Evacuee Trust Property Board has been criticised for leasing sacred Hindu temples to land grabbers. The board rented out the historic Kali Bari Hindu Temple to a Muslim party in Dera Ismail Khan in 2014. This historic temple is being converted and used as the Taj Mahal Hotel. Frontier Constabulary officials, with the help of the board, have occupied the Shamshan Ghaat in Dera Ismail Khan and the Hindu community is unable to cremate their dead because of the unavailability of Shamshan Ghaat and is forced to bury them in a graveyard shared by members of other faiths. Other temples which were misused include:

- Dagai Temple (Swabi District, Khyber Pakhtunkhwa): In March 2022 the 200‑year‑old temple faced demolition by a leaseholder citing an alleged ETPB NOC. Local protests halted the demolition and prompted an official inquiry.
- Shiv Temple, Kohat: Converted into a government primary school after being leased by the ETPB, effectively stripping it of its original religious function.
- Saidpur Ram temple, Islamabad: Several small temples and kunds transformed into picnic areas; many of the structures have been closed or allowed to fall into disrepair.
- Kalyan Das Temple, used as school.
- Wangri Garan Temple at Hashtnagri was demolished in 2016, and a three-storey commercial plaza was built despite opposition from Hindu community.
- Hindu temple in Bannu in the Teri area of Karak district is now converted to a bakery.
- Hindu temple in Kohat city is converted into a school.
- Gorakh Diggi, a holy place for Hindus is converted to a park
- The Asamai temple complex in Peshawar has been leased out to the families migrating from Kashmir.
- Pamwal Das Shiv Mandir, was slaughterhouse for cows

== See also ==
- Hinduism in Pakistan
- Hindu and Buddhist architectural heritage of Pakistan
- Scheduled Caste Federation of Pakistan
- Pakistan Hindu Council
- List of Hindu temples in Pakistan
- Central Wakf Council of India
- Mankiala stupa
- Hinglaj Mata
- Kalat Kali Temple
- Katasraj temple
- Malot
- Multan Sun Temple
- Prahladpuri Temple, Multan
- Sadh Belo
- Sakesar
- Shiv Mandir, Umerkot
- Shri Varun Dev Mandir
