= Shri Varun Dev Mandir =

Hindu temple on Manora Island, in Karachi, Pakistan

Shri Varun Dev Temple
- شْرِي وَرُڻَ ديوَ مَنْدِرَ
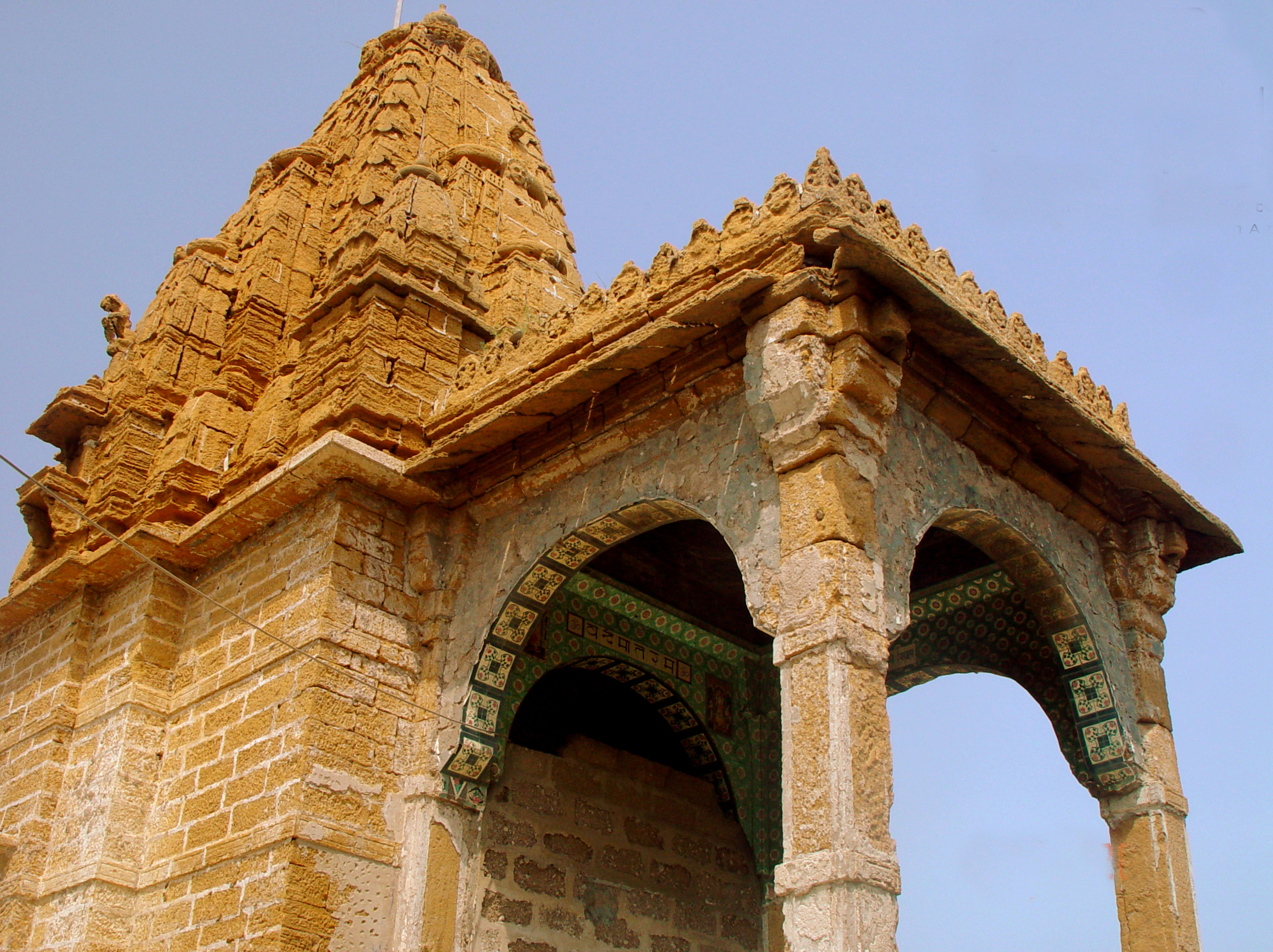

- Location within Sindh

Religion
- Affiliation: Hinduism
- District: Karachi
- Deity: Jhulelal (Varuna)
- Festivals: Cheti Chand, Chaliha Sahib
- Governing body: Pakistan Hindu Council

Location
- Location: Manora Beach
- State: Sindh
- Country: Pakistan
- Interactive map of Shri Varun Dev Temple
- Coordinates: 24°47′51.3″N 66°58′14.9″E

Architecture
- Type: Hindu temple

Specifications
- Temple: 1
- Monument: 1
- Inscriptions: 2

Website
- Pakistan Hindu Council

Shri Varun Dev Mandir (Sindhi: شْرِيْ وَرُڻَ ديوَ مَنْدِرَ ,श्री वरुण देव मंदिर, Urdu: شْرِیْ وَرُنَ دیوَ مَنْدِرَ) is a Hindu temple located on Manora Island in Karachi, Sindh, Pakistan. It is a historic temple and is devoted to Lord Varuna, the deity that represents water in Hinduism. The temple is believed to be the only temple dedicated to the Varuna in Pakistan. The temple is also associated with Jhulelal, an incarnation of Lord Varuna and has great significance to the Sindhi Hindus.

== Construction ==
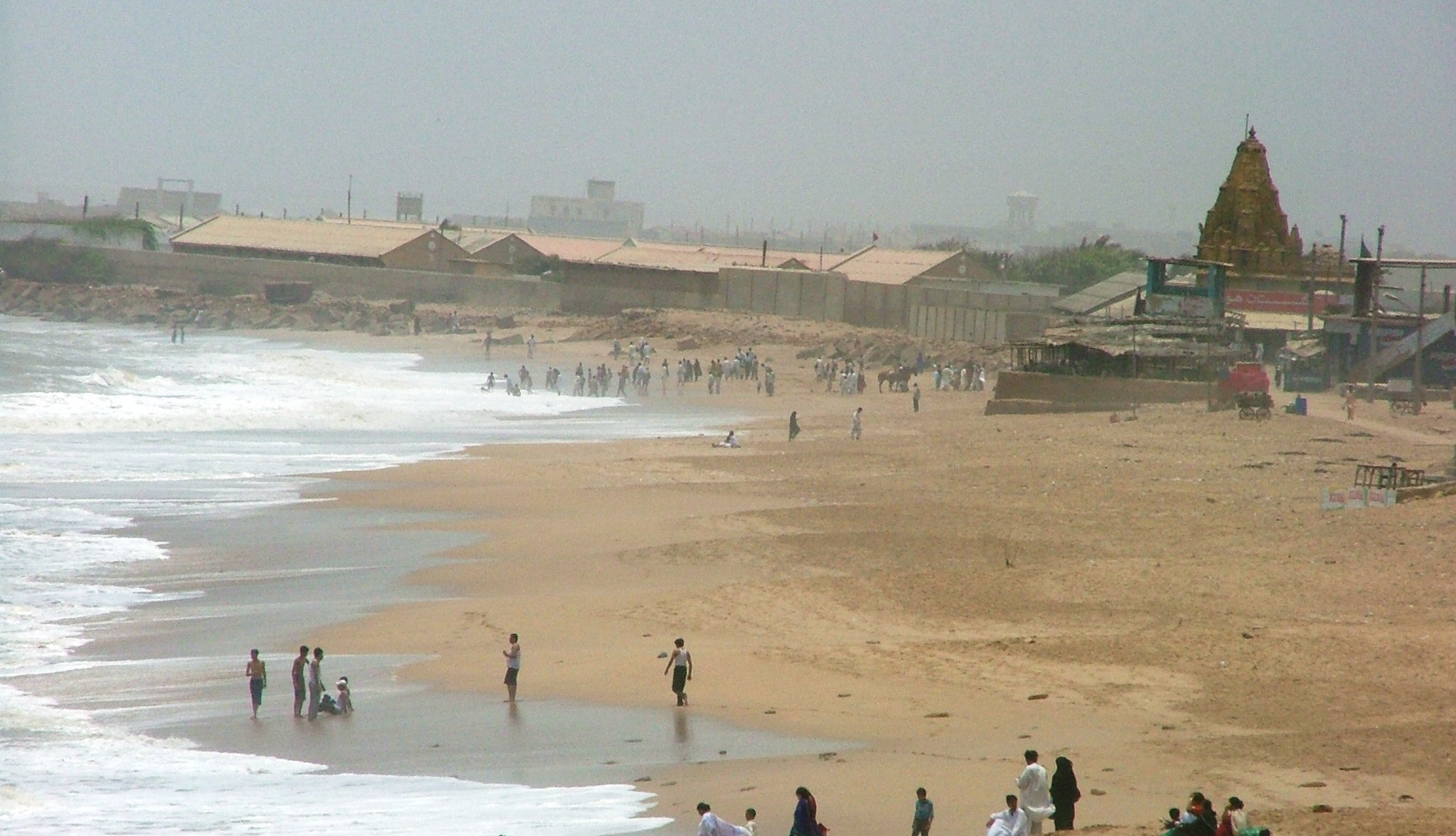
The temple was built near the seashore

According to a legend, it was built around 16th century when a wealthy sailor by the name of Bhojomal Nenshi Bhatia bought Manora Island from the Khan of Kalat, who owned most of the land along the coastline at that time and then his family commissioned a temple on the lay terrain.

The exact year of the temple's construction or foundation is estimated to be 1300 years ago but it is widely believed that the current structure was renovated in around 1917–18.

Inscription in devnagri script says, Om, Varun Dev temple.

The inscription in Sindhi on front gate says, dedication from sons in the sacred memory of Seth Harchand Mal Dayal Das of Bhriya. Bhriya is a town in Naushahro Feroze District, Sindh, Pakistan.

== Current status ==
Currently, this temple belongs to the Pakistan Hindu Council. The Evacuee Trust Property Board has completed restoration activities to protect and preserve this ancient heritage.

Previously, the temple was in a dilapidated state as humid winds were eating into the structure and the rich carvings on the walls of the temple were slowly eroding over time. There were efforts to protect and preserve the structure by the Sindh Exploration and Adventure Society (SEAS) under a US government-funded project, which managed to successfully restore the temple in 2018.

== See also ==
- Hinduism in Pakistan
- Evacuee Trust Property Board
- Pakistan Hindu Council
- Hinglaj Mata
- Kalat Kali Temple
- Katasraj temple
- Multan Sun Temple
- Prahladpuri Temple, Multan
- Sadh Belo
- Shiv Mandir, Umerkot
- Darya Lal Mandir
