= Pakistan Hindu Mandir Management Committee =

Pakistani organisation

- کمیٹی مدیریت ہندو مندیر پاکستان
- Abbreviation: PHMMC
- Formation: 29 December 2021
- Type: Government-appointed committee
- Location: Pakistan
- Region served: Pakistan
- President: Krishna Sharma
- Affiliations: Evacuee Trust Property Board
- Website: etpb.gov.pk/shrines/pakistan-hindu-mandir-management-committee/

The Pakistan Hindu Mandir Management Committee is a subordinate body under the Evacuee Trust Property Board to manage the Hindu temples under it.It was instituted by the Ministry of Religious Affairs and Inter-faith Harmony.

== History ==
This committee was formed on 29 December 2021. The inaugural meeting of the Pakistan Hindu Temple Management Committee was chaired by the then Federal Minister for Religious Affairs Noorul Haq Qadri. Krishna Sharma was appointed as its president. In May 2022, its first meeting was held.

== Composition ==
The current members of the committee are:

- President- Krishan Sharma
- General Secretary-Dewan Chand Chawla
- Members- Ameet Kumar Shahdani, Mohan Das Member, Niranajan Kumar, Ashok Kumar, Virse Mal Dewani, Amar Nath Randhawa, Haroon Sarab Diyal.

The committee also has focal person for administrative divisions.

== Responsibilities ==
The main objective of the committee is to act as a bridge between the non-Muslim population and the state. The committee is expected to help solve the problems faced by the Pakistani Hindu community.

The Committee shall also be responsible for facilitating the Hindu Yatris (pilgrims) and making their journey and stay within Pakistan as comfortable as possible, besides making other necessary arrangements for their reception and farewell on every religious occasion.

== Notable works ==
One of the notable steps taken by the committee is the recovery of the historic Nila Gumbad Valmiki Hindu temple in Lahore from illegal occupants. The temple was in dispute for 12 years and was finally reclaimed by the Evacuee Trust Property Board (ETPB) after a long court battle. In 2025, it formed a joint committee with Pakistan Sikh Gurdwara Prabandhak Committee to investigate a sacrilege incident in Sindh.

== See also ==
- Pakistan Hindu Council
- Pakistan Hindu Panchayat
- Pakistan Sikh Gurdwara Prabandhak Committee
