= Hinduism in Pakistan =

Pakistani Hindus پاکستانی ہندو
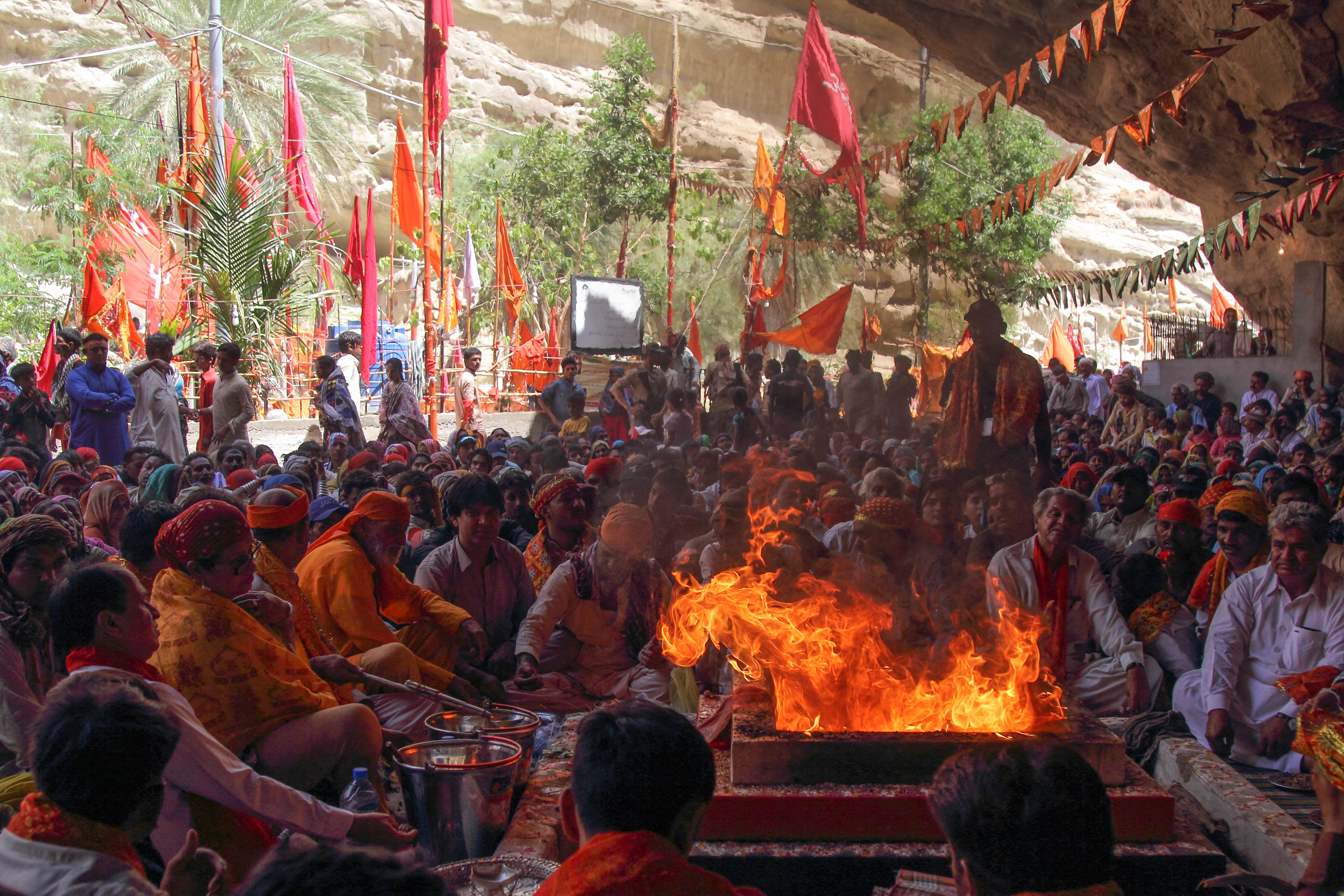
- Hawan at Shri Hinglaj Mata temple during Hinglaj Yatra in Lasbela, Balochistan

Total population
- ▲5,216,034 (2023 census) ▲ (2.17%) of Pakistan's population)

Regions with significant populations
- Sindh: 4,901,107 (8.81%)
- Punjab: 249,716 (0.2%)
- Balochistan: 59,107 (0.41%)
- Khyber Pakhtunkhwa: 6,104 (0.02%)

Scriptures
- Vedas, Upanishads, Puranas, Ramayana, and Bhagavad Gita

Languages
- Sanskrit (liturgical); Sindhi (majority), Punjabi, Brahui, Baluchi, Urdu, Pashto and others

Hinduism is the second largest religion in Pakistan after Islam. Pakistani Hindus are primarily concentrated in Sindh, speaking a variety of languages including Sindhi, Seraiki and Dhatki, with notable enclaves located in Umerkot District, where Hindus form 54.7 percent of the population, alongside Tharparkar District, which has the largest total Hindu population at 811,505 residents. Hindus are also found in smaller numbers in Balochistan, Punjab, and Khyber Pakhtunkhwa. While some Hindu youth associate themselves with ISKCON society, most Pakistani Hindus, especially in rural areas, adhere to a syncretic form of Hinduism which include following the teachings of 14th-century Hindu saint Ramdevji and revering "Mother Goddess" alonside the reverence of local Sufi pīrs and Guru Nanak. One of the most important places of worship for Hindus in Pakistan is the shrine of Shri Hinglaj Mata temple in Balochistan, highlighted by the annual Hinglaj Yatra being the largest Hindu pilgrimage in Pakistan.

Hinduism was the dominant faith in the region through the medieval ages, prior to the Muslim period in South Asia, Prior to the Partition of British India, the 1941 census detailed Hindus formed 14.6 percent of the population in West Pakistan (contemporary Pakistan), numbering approximately 4 million persons. (Note: 1941 figure taken from census data by combining the total population of all administrative divisions that compose the region of contemporary Pakistan, including Punjab, (Note: 1941 figure taken from census data by combining the total population of all districts (Lahore, Sialkot, Gujranwala, Sheikhupura, Gujrat, Shahpur, Jhelum, Rawalpindi, Attock, Mianwali, Montgomery, Lyallpur, Jhang, Multan, Muzaffargargh, Dera Ghazi Khan), one tehsil (Shakargarh – then part of Gurdaspur District), one princely state (Bahawalpur), and one tract (Biloch Trans–Frontier) in Punjab Province, British India that ultimately fell on the western side of the Radcliffe Line. See 1941 census data here: Immediately following the partition of India in 1947, these districts and tract would ultimately make up the subdivision of West Punjab, which also later included Bahawalpur. The state that makes up this region in the contemporary era is Punjab, Pakistan.) Sindh, (Note: 1941 figure taken from census data by combining the total population of all districts (Dadu, Hyderabad, Karachi, Larkana, Nawabshah, Sukkur, Tharparkar, Upper Sind Frontier), and one princely state (Khairpur), in Sindh Province, British India. See 1941 census data here:) Khyber Pakhtunkhwa, Balochistan, Azad Jammu and Kashmir, (Note: 1941 figure taken from census data by combining the total population of two districts (Mirpur and Muzaffarabad) and one Jagir (Poonch) in the Princely State of Jammu and Kashmir that ultimately would be administered by Pakistan, in the contemporary self-administrative territory of Azad Jammu and Kashmir. See 1941 census data here:) and Gilgit–Baltistan. (Note: 1941 figure taken from census data by combining the total population of one district (Astore) and one agency (Gilgit) in the Princely State of Jammu and Kashmir that ultimately would be administered by Pakistan, in the contemporary administrative territory of Gilgit–Baltistan. See 1941 census data here:)) Independence and the ensuing partition in 1947 resulted in millions of Hindus and Sikhs migrating to India as refugees; as a result, the 1951 census revealed Hindus numbered 531,131 persons and constituted 1.58 percent of the total population of West Pakistan (contemporary Pakistan), later falling in proportion to form 1.44 percent of the total population by the 1972 census. In the ensuing five decades, the Hindu population has risen to form 2.17 percent of the national population, with over 5.2 million Pakistanis adhering to the religion according to the 2023 Pakistani census.

Though the Constitution of Pakistan provides equal rights to all citizens and is not supposed to discriminate on the basis of caste, creed or religion, Islam remains the state religion, often meaning Muslims are afforded more privileges than Hindus or other religious minorities. There have been numerous cases of violence and discrimination against Hindus and other minorities, with periodic cases of violence and ill-treatment due to strict blasphemy laws. Notwithstanding, Sindh's significant Hindu heritage, cultural legacy, and historical influence continues to shape the landscape and identity of region into the contemporary era.

== History ==
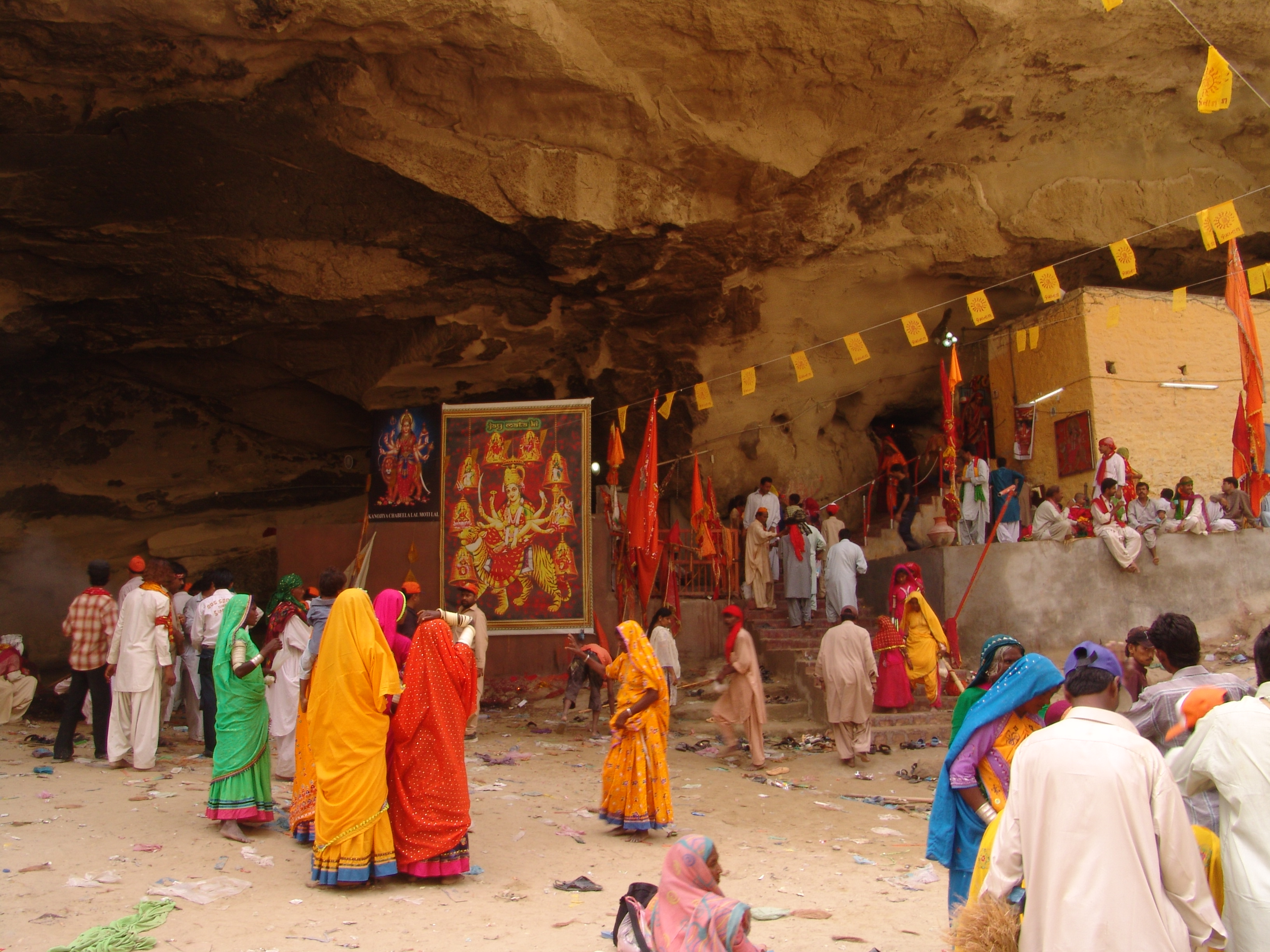
Hinglaj Mata Mandir Cave entrance

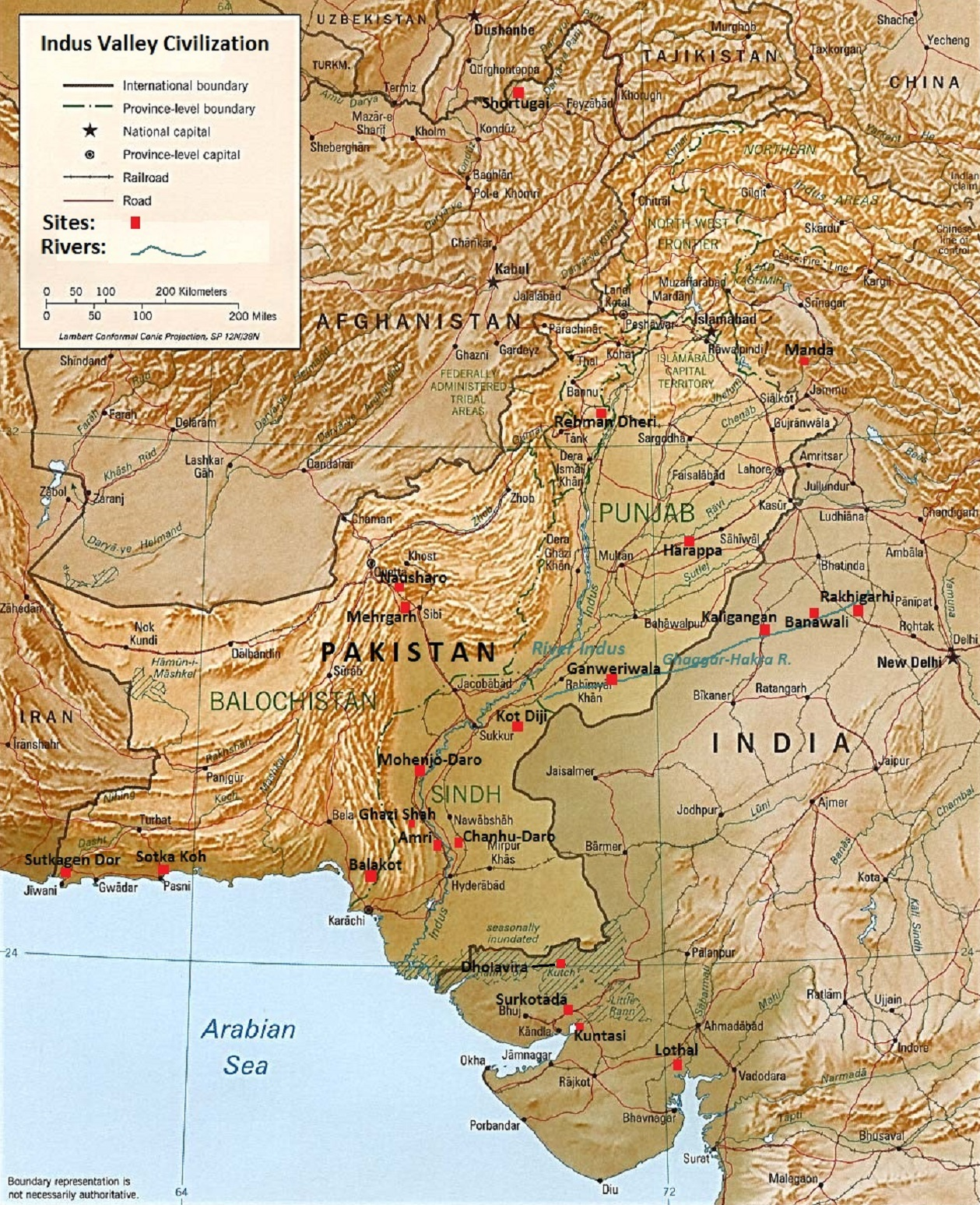
Extent of the Indus Valley Civilization sites

Though Hinduism was the dominant faith in the region a few centuries ago, its adherents presently accounted for 2.17% of Pakistan's population (approximately 5.2 million people) according to the 2023 Pakistani census, primarily due to large-scale migration and displacement of Hindus during the 1947 partition and, to a lesser extent, following the 1971 war, the liberation war of Bangladesh (then East Pakistan). Prior to the partition of India, according to the 1941 census, Hindus constituted 14.6% of the population in West Pakistan (contemporary Pakistan) and 28% of the population in East Pakistan (contemporary Bangladesh). After British India gained independence from the British Raj, estimates detailing the migratory flows following the ensuing partition detail between 4.7 and 5.0 million Hindus and Sikhs migrated from West Pakistan to India as refugees. The following census, taken in 1951 detailed Hindus formed 1.6 percent of the total population of West Pakistan (contemporary Pakistan), and 22 percent of East Pakistan.

=== Origins ===
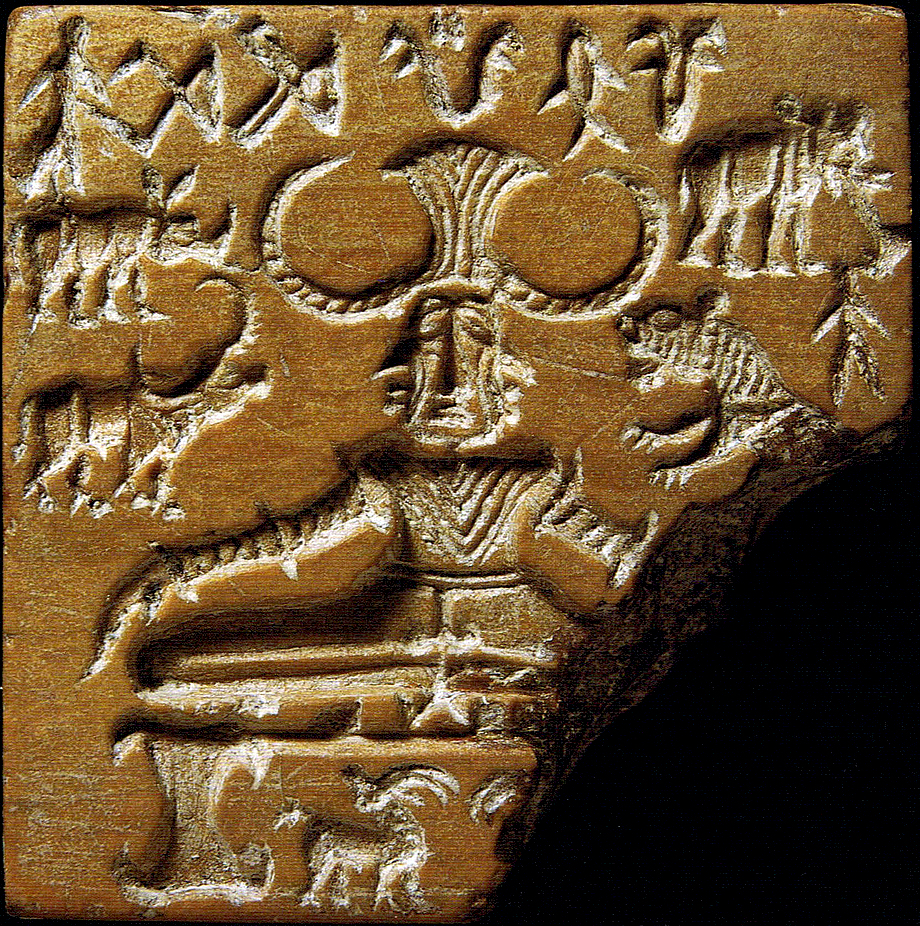
The Pashupati seal

During the Vedic period, the Rig Veda, the oldest Hindu text, is believed to have been composed in the Punjab region of modern-day Pakistan (and India) on the banks of the Indus River around 1500 BCE.

The Sindh kingdom and its rulers play an important role in the Indian epic story of the Mahabharata. In addition, a Hindu legend states that the Pakistani city of Lahore was first founded by Lava, while Kasur was founded by his twin Kusha, both of whom were the sons of Lord Rama of the Ramayana. The Gandhara kingdom of the northwest is also a major part of Hindu literature such as the Ramayana and the Mahabharata. Many Pakistani city names (such as Peshawar and Multan) have Sanskrit roots.

=== Pre-Islamic period ===
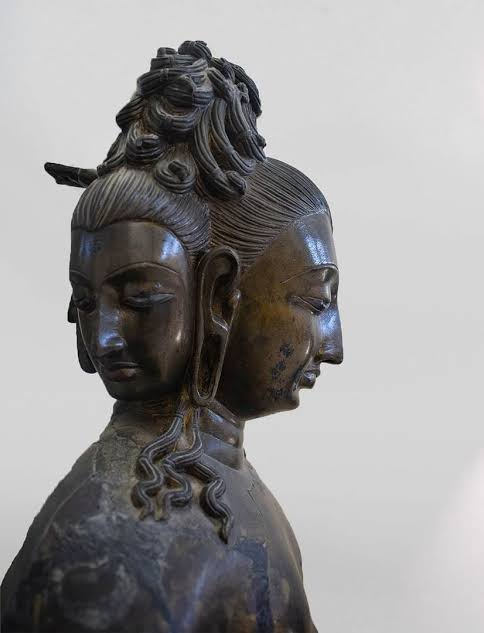
Excavation of a Brahma bronze from Mirpur Khas

The Vedic period (1500–500 BCE) was characterised by an Indo-Aryan culture; during this period the Vedas, the oldest scriptures associated with Hinduism, were composed, and this culture later became well established in the region. Multan was an important Hindu pilgrimage centre. The Vedic civilisation flourished in the ancient Gandhāran city of Takṣaśilā, now Taxila in the Punjab, which was founded around 1000 BCE. Successive ancient empires and kingdoms ruled the region: the Persian Achaemenid Empire (around 519 BCE), Alexander's empire in 326 BCE and the Maurya Empire, founded by Chandragupta Maurya and extended by Ashoka the Great, until 185 BCE. The Indo-Greek Kingdom founded by Demetrius of Bactria (180–165 BCE) included Gandhara and Punjab and reached its greatest extent under Menander (165–150 BCE), prospering the Greco-Buddhist culture in the region. Taxila had one of the earliest universities and centres of higher education in the world. The school consisted of several monasteries without large dormitories or lecture halls where the religious instruction was provided on an individualistic basis. The ancient university was documented by the invading forces of Alexander the Great and was also recorded by Chinese pilgrims in the 4th or 5th century CE.

At its zenith, the Rai dynasty (489–632 CE) of Sindh ruled this region and the surrounding territories.

=== Early Muslim conquests and invasion of Sindh ===
After the conquest of Sindh by Muhammad bin Qasim and the loss of Raja Dahir, Islamization in Pakistan started and the population of Hindus started declining. After that many other Islamic conquests in Indian subcontinent entered through the Pakistan's region, including that of Ghaznavids, Ghurids and Delhi Sultanate, due to which the Buddhists and Hindus were converted to Islam. In the era of Mughal Empire, the land of Pakistan became a Muslim-majority area.

=== Colonial era ===
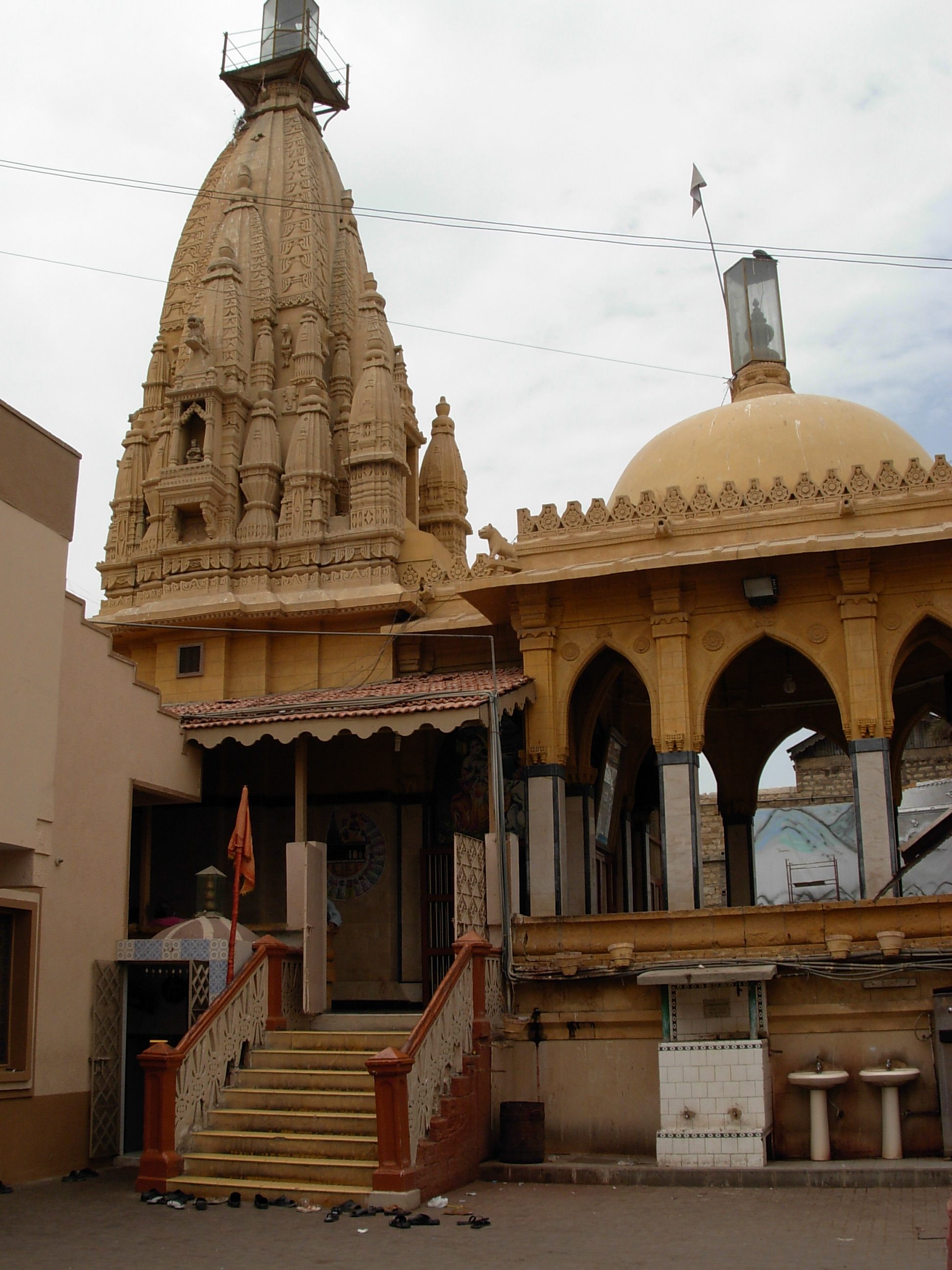
The Swaminarayan Temple in Karachi was a departure point for those migrating to India after independence.

Decadal censuses taken in British India revealed the religious composition of all administrative divisions that would ultimately compose regions situated in contemporary Pakistan, with the Hindu population numbering 3,009,842 persons or 17.1 percent of the total population in 1901. (Note: 1901 figure taken from census data by combining the total population of all administrative divisions that compose the region of contemporary Pakistan, including Punjab, (Note: 1901 figure taken from census data by combining the total population of all districts (Lahore, Sialkot, Gujranwala, Gujrat, Shahpur, Jhelum, Rawalpindi, Mianwali, Montgomery, Lyallpur (inscribed as the Chenab Colony on the 1901 census), Jhang, Multan, Muzaffargargh, Dera Ghazi Khan), one tehsil (Shakargarh – then part of Gurdaspur District), one princely state (Bahawalpur), and one tract (Biloch Trans–Frontier) in Punjab Province, British India that ultimately fell on the western side of the Radcliffe Line. See 1901 census data here: Immediately following the partition of India in 1947, these districts and tract would ultimately make up the subdivision of West Punjab, which also later included Bahawalpur. The state that makes up this region in the contemporary era is Punjab, Pakistan.) Sindh, (Note: 1901 figure taken from census data by combining the total population of all districts (Karachi, Hyderabad, Shikarpur, Tharparkar, Upper Sind Frontier), and one princely state (Khairpur), in Sindh Province, British India. See 1901 census data here:) Khyber Pakhtunkhwa, Balochistan, Azad Jammu and Kashmir, (Note: 1901 figure taken from census data by combining the total population of two districts (Bhimber and Muzaffarabad) and one Jagir (Poonch) in the Princely State of Jammu and Kashmir that ultimately would be administered by Pakistan, in the contemporary self-administrative territory of Azad Jammu and Kashmir. See 1901 census data here:) and Gilgit–Baltistan. (Note: 1901 figure taken from census data using the total population of Gilgit District in the Princely State of Jammu and Kashmir that ultimately would be administered by Pakistan, in the contemporary administrative territory of Gilgit–Baltistan. See 1901 census data here:)) Later, the final census conducted prior to independence in 1941 revealed Hindus numbered 3,981,565 persons or 14.6 percent of the total population.

During the independence of Pakistan in 1947, estimates detail between 4.7 and 5.0 million Hindus and Sikhs from West Pakistan migrated to India. The reasons for this exodus were the heavily charged communal atmosphere in British Raj, deep distrust of each other, the brutality of violent mobs and the antagonism between the religious communities. Over 1 million people perished, primarily due to large scale religious cleansing as witnessed during the Rawalpindi Massacres, Gujrat train massacre, Kamoke train massacre etc.

=== Post-independence period (1947–present) ===
At the time of Pakistan’s creation, the “hostage theory” had been espoused. According to this theory the Hindu minority in Pakistan was to be given a fair deal in Pakistan in order to ensure the protection of the Muslim minority in India. Muhammad Ali Jinnah, the founder of Pakistan, stated in an address to the constituent assembly of Pakistan, "You will find that in course of time Hindus will cease to be Hindus and Muslims will cease to be Muslims, not in the religious sense, because that is the personal faith of each individual, but in the political sense as the citizens of the State." However, Khawaja Nazimuddin, the 2nd Prime Minister of Pakistan stated: "I do not agree that religion is a private affair of the individual nor do I agree that in an Islamic state every citizen has identical rights, no matter what his caste, creed or faith be".

In 1956, the government of Pakistan declared 32 castes and tribes, the majority of them Hindus, to be Scheduled Caste, including Kohlis, Meghawars, and Bheels, thus bifurcating the members of scheduled castes from Jāti (Caste) Hindus. Throughout the post-independence era, scheduled caste activists have argued that the members elected on the minority reserved seats are upper caste Hindus despite scheduled castes Hindus forming majority of the Hindus in Pakistan, indicating the classification of both groups under the single category of "Hindu" would benefit mostly the upper caste Hindus, by increasing the overall reported Hindu population, while their comparatively greater economic influence enables them to secure most of the minority reserved seats. Organisations like the Dalit Sujag Tehreek and the Bheel Intellectual Forum support separate identity in Census for scheduled caste Hindus and have conducted awareness campaigns. In recent years, however, some other Hindu politicians like Mangla Sharma and Ramesh Kumar Vankwani were against this categorisation as it divides the Hindu community into two.

== Demography ==
Hindu population in Pakistan
Year	Pop.	±% p.a.
1901	3,009,842	—
1911	2,766,581	−0.84%
1921	2,957,680	+0.67%
1931	3,298,570	+1.10%
1941	3,981,565	+1.90%
1951	531,131	−18.24%
1961	621,805	+1.59%
1972	900,206	+3.42%
1981	1,276,116	+3.95%
1998	2,443,614	+3.90%
2017	4,444,870	+3.20%
2023	5,217,216	+2.71%
Including Jāti (Caste) and Scheduled Caste. Source: (Note: 1911 figure taken from census data by combining the total population of all administrative divisions that compose the region of contemporary Pakistan, including Punjab, (Note: 1911 figure taken from census data by combining the total population of all districts (Lahore, Sialkot, Gujranwala, Gujrat, Shahpur, Jhelum, Rawalpindi, Attock, Mianwali, Montgomery, Lyallpur, Jhang, Multan, Muzaffargargh, Dera Ghazi Khan), one tehsil (Shakargarh – then part of Gurdaspur District), one princely state (Bahawalpur), and one tract (Biloch Trans–Frontier) in Punjab Province, British India that ultimately fell on the western side of the Radcliffe Line. See 1911 census data here: Immediately following the partition of India in 1947, these districts and tract would ultimately make up the subdivision of West Punjab, which also later included Bahawalpur. The state that makes up this region in the contemporary era is Punjab, Pakistan.) Sindh, (Note: 1911 figure taken from census data by combining the total population of all districts (Hyderabad, Karachi, Larkana, Sukkur, Tharparkar, Upper Sind Frontier), and one princely state (Khairpur), in Sindh Province, British India. See 1911 census data here:) Khyber Pakhtunkhwa, Balochistan, Azad Jammu and Kashmir, (Note: 1911 figure taken from census data by combining the total population of two districts (Mirpur and Muzaffarabad) and one Jagir (Poonch) in the Princely State of Jammu and Kashmir that ultimately would be administered by Pakistan, in the contemporary self-administrative territory of Azad Jammu and Kashmir. See 1911 census data here:) and Gilgit–Baltistan. (Note: 1911 figure taken from census data by combining the total population of Gilgit District and the Frontier Ilaqas in the Princely State of Jammu and Kashmir that ultimately would be administered by Pakistan, in the contemporary administrative territory of Gilgit–Baltistan. See 1911 census data here:)) (Note: 1921 figure taken from census data by combining the total population of all administrative divisions that compose the region of contemporary Pakistan, including Punjab, (Note: 1921 figure taken from census data by combining the total population of all districts (Lahore, Sialkot, Gujranwala, Sheikhupura, Gujrat, Shahpur, Jhelum, Rawalpindi, Attock, Mianwali, Montgomery, Lyallpur, Jhang, Multan, Muzaffargargh, Dera Ghazi Khan), one tehsil (Shakargarh – then part of Gurdaspur District), one princely state (Bahawalpur), and one tract (Biloch Trans–Frontier) in Punjab Province, British India that ultimately fell on the western side of the Radcliffe Line. See 1921 census data here: Immediately following the partition of India in 1947, these districts and tract would ultimately make up the subdivision of West Punjab, which also later included Bahawalpur. The state that makes up this region in the contemporary era is Punjab, Pakistan.) Sindh, (Note: 1921 figure taken from census data by combining the total population of all districts (Hyderabad, Karachi, Larkana, Nawabshah, Sukkur, Tharparkar, Upper Sind Frontier), and one princely state (Khairpur), in Sindh Province, British India. See 1921 census data here:) Khyber Pakhtunkhwa, Balochistan, Azad Jammu and Kashmir, (Note: 1921 figure taken from census data by combining the total population of two districts (Mirpur and Muzaffarabad) and one Jagir (Poonch) in the Princely State of Jammu and Kashmir that ultimately would be administered by Pakistan, in the contemporary self-administrative territory of Azad Jammu and Kashmir. See 1921 census data here:) and Gilgit–Baltistan. (Note: 1921 figure taken from census data by combining the total population of Gilgit District and the Frontier Ilaqas in the Princely State of Jammu and Kashmir that ultimately would be administered by Pakistan, in the contemporary administrative territory of Gilgit–Baltistan. See 1921 census data here:)) (Note: 1931 figure taken from census data by combining the total population of all administrative divisions that compose the region of contemporary Pakistan, including Punjab, (Note: 1931 figure taken from census data by combining the total population of all districts (Lahore, Sialkot, Gujranwala, Sheikhupura, Gujrat, Shahpur, Jhelum, Rawalpindi, Attock, Mianwali, Montgomery, Lyallpur, Jhang, Multan, Muzaffargargh, Dera Ghazi Khan), one tehsil (Shakargarh – then part of Gurdaspur District), one princely state (Bahawalpur), and one tract (Biloch Trans–Frontier) in Punjab Province, British India that ultimately fell on the western side of the Radcliffe Line. See 1931 census data here: Immediately following the partition of India in 1947, these districts and tract would ultimately make up the subdivision of West Punjab, which also later included Bahawalpur. The state that makes up this region in the contemporary era is Punjab, Pakistan.) Sindh, (Note: 1931 figure taken from census data by combining the total population of all districts (Hyderabad, Karachi, Larkana, Nawabshah, Sukkur, Tharparkar, Upper Sind Frontier), and one princely state (Khairpur), in Sindh Province, British India. See 1931 census data here:) Khyber Pakhtunkhwa, Balochistan, Azad Jammu and Kashmir, and Gilgit–Baltistan. (Note: 1931 figure taken from census data by combining the total population of Gilgit District and the Frontier Ilaqas in the Princely State of Jammu and Kashmir that ultimately would be administered by Pakistan, in the contemporary administrative territory of Gilgit–Baltistan. See 1931 census data here:))

The 1901 Census in British India taken in administrative divisions that would ultimately compose regions situated in contemporary Pakistan indicated that Hindus comprised roughly 17.1 percent of the total population. In the final census taken prior to partition in 1941, Hindus constituted 14.6 percent of the population in West Pakistan (contemporary Pakistan); amongst administrative units, the noted the largest Hindu concentrations existed in Tharparkar District (Hindus formed 42.60 percent of the total population and numbered 247,496 persons), Shakargarh Tehsil (Note: Part of Gurdaspur District (British Punjab) which was awarded to Pakistan as part of the Radcliffe Line.) (39.98 percent or 116,553 persons), Hyderabad District (32.40 percent or 245,849 persons), Karachi District (31.18 percent or 222,597 persons), Sukkur District (28.22 percent or 195,458 persons), Nawabshah District (24.04 percent or 140,428 persons), Sialkot District (19.43 percent or 231,319 persons), Quetta–Pishin District (18.32 percent or 28,629 persons), Larkana District (17.81 percent or 91,062 persons), and Multan District (16.83 percent or 249,872 persons).

After Pakistan gained independence from Britain on 14 August 1947, approximately 4.7 to 5.0 million Hindus and Sikhs migrated from West Pakistan to India. In the 1951 census, Hindus numbered 531,131 persons and constituted 1.58 percent of the total population of West Pakistan (contemporary Pakistan). In the following two decades, the Hindu population would rise to 900,206 persons by the 1972 census, despite falling in proportion to form 1.44 percent of the total population; thereafter the Hindu population has seen a marginal proportional increase in each decadal census, rising to form 2.17 percent of the total population at the time of the 2023 census.

Hinduism in Pakistan (1901–2023)
Year	Number	Percent	Increase	Growth	Source(s)
1901	3,009,842	17.07%	-	-	
1911	2,766,581	14.71%	-2.36%	-8.08%	
1921	2,957,680	15.25%	+0.54%	+6.9%	
1931	3,298,570	14.65%	-0.6%	+11.52%	
1941	3,981,565	14.6%	-0.05%	+20.7%	
1951	531,131	1.58%	-13.2%	-86.66%	
1961	621,805	1.45%	-0.13%	+17.7%	
1972	900,206	1.44%	-0.01%	+44.77%	
1981	1,276,116	1.51%	+0.07%	+41.75%	
1998	2,443,614	1.85%	+0.34%	+91.48%	
2017	4,444,870	2.14%	+0.29%	+81.89%	
2023	5,217,216	2.17%	+0.03%	+17.37%	

=== Historical census data ===
Hinduism in Pakistan by administrative division (1901–2023)
Census year	Total Pakistan		Punjab		Sindh		KPK		AJK		Balochistan		Gilgit– Baltistan		ICT	
Census year	Hindu Population	Hindu Percentage	Pop.	%	Pop.	%	Pop.	%	Pop.	%	Pop.	%	Pop.	%	Pop.	%
1901	3,009,842	17.07%	1,944,363	18.65%	787,683	23.1%	129,306 (Note: All colonial–era (1855, 1868, 1881, 1891, 1901, 1911, 1921, 1931, and 1941) census counts in the territory of contemporary Khyber Pakhtunkhwa amalgamate all districts of North-West Frontier Province at the time, including Hazara, Mardan, Peshawar, Kohat, Bannu, and Dera Ismail Khan. Furthermore, all colonial–era census counts did not enumerate religious affiliation in the Federally Administered Tribal Areas alongside Amb, Chitral, Dir, Phulra and Swat princely states. Additionally, religious affiliation was not enumerated in the Federally Administered Tribal Areas during one modern–era census count (1972). All other modern–era (1951, 1961, 1981, 1998, 2017, 2023) census counts are an amalgamation of the North-West Frontier Province and Federally Administered Tribal Areas. Both administrative divisions would ultimately merge to form Khyber Pakhtunkhwa in 2018.)	6.31%	108,331	12.41%	38,158	4.71%	2,001	3.29%	—N/a	—N/a
1911	2,766,581	14.71%	1,645,758	14.82%	877,313	23.47%	119,942	5.46%	84,130	9.85%	38,326	4.59%	1,112	1.42%	—N/a	—N/a
1921	2,957,680	15.25%	1,797,141	15.12%	876,629	25.24%	149,881	6.66%	81,733	9.22%	51,348	6.42%	948	1.06%	—N/a	—N/a
1931	3,298,570	14.65%	1,957,878	13.94%	1,055,119	25.65%	142,977	5.9%	87,554 (Note: 1931 figure taken from census data by combining the total population of two districts (Mirpur and Muzaffarabad) and one Jagir (Poonch) in the Princely State of Jammu and Kashmir that ultimately would be administered by Pakistan, in the contemporary self-administrative territory of Azad Jammu and Kashmir. See 1931 census data here:)	9.03%	53,681	6.18%	1,361	1.41%	—N/a	—N/a
1941	3,981,565	14.6%	2,373,466	13.69%	1,279,530	26.43%	180,321	5.94%	93,559	8.72%	54,394	6.34%	295	0.25%	—N/a	—N/a
1951	531,131	1.58%	33,052	0.16%	482,560 (Note: Including Federal Capital Territory (Karachi))	7.98%	2,432	0.04%	—N/a	—N/a	13,087	1.13%	—N/a	—N/a	—N/a	—N/a
1961	621,805	1.45%	41,965 (Note: Including Rawalpindi Division, Sargodha Division, Lahore Division, Multan Division, and Bahawalpur Division.)	0.16%	568,530 (Note: Including Khairpur Division, Hyderabad Division, and Karachi Division.)	6.64%	1,474 (Note: Including Peshawar Division and Dera Ismail Khan Division.)	0.02%	—N/a	—N/a	9,836 (Note: Including Quetta Division and Kalat Division.)	0.85%	—N/a	—N/a	—N/a	—N/a
1972	900,206	1.44%	61,405 (Note: Including Rawalpindi Division, Sargodha Division, Lahore Division, Multan Division, and Bahawalpur Division.)	0.16%	815,452 (Note: Including Sukkur Division, Hyderabad Division, and Karachi Division.)	5.76%	5,014 (Note: Including Federally Administered Tribal Areas, Malakand Division, Peshawar Division and Dera Ismail Khan Division.)	0.06%	—N/a	—N/a	18,223 (Note: Including Quetta Division and Kalat Division.)	0.75%	—N/a	—N/a	112	0.05%
1981	1,276,116	1.51%	29,268	0.06%	1,221,961	6.42%	5,253	0.04%	—N/a	—N/a	19,598	0.45%	—N/a	—N/a	36	0.01%
1998	2,443,614	1.85%	116,410	0.16%	2,280,842	7.49%	7,011	0.03%	—N/a	—N/a	39,146	0.6%	—N/a	—N/a	205	0.03%
2017	4,444,870	2.14%	211,641	0.19%	4,176,986	8.73%	6,373	0.02%	—N/a	—N/a	49,133	0.4%	—N/a	—N/a	737	0.04%
2023	5,217,216	2.17%	249,716	0.2%	4,901,407	8.81%	6,102	0.02%	—N/a	—N/a	59,107	0.41%	—N/a	—N/a	884	0.04%

==== 2023 Census ====
Hindu Proportion of each Pakistani District in 2017 according to the Pakistan Bureau of Statistics

The 2023 census recorded 5,217,216 Hindus, which includes 3,867,729 categorised as Jāti (Caste) and 1,349,487 as Scheduled Caste Hindus. However, the actual population of Scheduled Caste Hindus is expected to be much higher, as the Scheduled Caste Hindus categorise themselves as Jāti (Caste) in the census rather than as Scheduled Caste. Also the Scheduled Caste may not include all Hindu scheduled castes, like Jogi community which are not formally listed as Scheduled caste in Pakistan. Provincial level Hindu population as per 2023 Census is shown below:

Province	Total Population	Hindu (Jati)		Scheduled Caste		All Hindus		Total Hindus %
Sindh	55,638,409	3,575,848	6.43%	1,325,559	2.38%	4,901,407	8.81%	93.95%
Balochistan	14,562,011	57,010	0.39%	2,097	0.01%	59,107	0.41%	1.13%
Punjab	127,333,305	228,559	0.18%	21,157	0.02%	249,716	0.20%	4.79%
Khyber Pakhtunkhwa	40,641,120	5,473	0.013%	629	0.002%	6,102	0.015%	0.12%
Islamabad Capital Territory	2,283,890	839	0.037%	45	0.002%	884	0.039%	0.02%
Pakistan (total)	240,458,089	3,867,729	1.61%	1,349,487	0.56%	5,217,216	2.17%	100.00%

Umerkot district (52.15%) is the only Hindu majority district in Pakistan. Tharparkar district has the highest population of Hindus in terms of absolute terms at 811,507. The four districts- Umerkot, Tharparkar, Mirpurkhas and Sanghar hosts more than half of the Hindu population in Pakistan.

All districts with a Hindu population greater than 1%, according to the 2023 census. In other districts the population of Hindus is less than 1%.

Administrative Unit	District	Percentage of Hindus
Sindh	Umerkot	54.66%
Sindh	Tharparkar	45.64%
Sindh	Mirpur Khas	41.48%
Sindh	Tando Allahyar	36.59%
Sindh	Badin	25.11%
Sindh	Sanghar	24.47%
Sindh	Tando Muhammad Khan	23.98%
Sindh	Matiari	18.03%
Sindh	Hyderabad	8.32%
Sindh	Ghotki	6.35%
Sindh	Jamshoro	4.76%
Sindh	Shaheed Benazirabad	4.49%
Sindh	Karachi South	4.24%
Sindh	Sukkur	3.63%
Sindh	Kashmore	3.21%
Sindh	Thatta	2.92%
Sindh	Khairpur	2.90%
Sindh	Sujawal	2.65%
Sindh	Jacobabad	1.89%
Sindh	Malir	1.66%
Sindh	Naushahro Feroze	1.63%
Sindh	Karachi East	1.57%
Sindh	Shikarpur	1.51%
Sindh	Larkana	1.45%
Punjab	Rahim Yar Khan	3.17%
Punjab	Bahawalpur	1.14%
Balochistan (Note: The Hub district was formed out of this district by merging Gadani, Winder, Hub and Dureji tehsils. So the data was obtained by removing the values for these 4 tehsils, The Usta Mohammad district was formed in 2022 by carving Usta Muhammad and Gandakha tehsils out of erstwhile Jaffarabad district. 2023 census data was obtained by removing the totals of these two tehsils.)	Lasbela	2.95%
Balochistan	Hub	2.01%
Balochistan	Sibi	1.90%
Balochistan	Usta Muhammad	1.37%
Balochistan	Jaffarabad	1.12%

Hindus form more than 50% of population in the tehsils of Mithi (69.87%), Nagarparkar (66.6%) and Islamkot (62.26%) in Tharparkar District; Kunri (56.37%), Umerkot (55.52%), and Samaro (53.98%) in Umerkot District; Kot Ghulam Muhammad (59.32%) and Shujaabad (50.24%) in Mirpur Khas District.

=== Population estimates ===
The official number of Hindus living in Pakistan is about 5.2 million or 2.17% as per 2023 census conducted by Pakistan government authority, which is consistent with estimates by the Pew Research Center in 2020.

However, at different time Pakistani Hindu organisations and community members have given numbers based on their estimation research which have led to various controversies with estimates ranging from 8 million to 10 million

According to a 2015 Pew Analysis Report, Hinduism is reported to be the fastest-growing religion in Pakistan. The report said there were 3.33 million Hindus in Pakistan making it the fifth largest Hindu Population in the world and by 2050, it is projected to climb to the fourth position with 5.63 million Hindus, surpasses Indonesia. However as of the 2023 Census, Pakistan hosts 5.2 million Hindus which is near to the Pew's 2050 estimate. A subsequent survey was released by Pew in 2025, in which Hindu population was estimated to be 5.03 million in 2020, highlighting it to have the fourth largest Hindu population, surpassing Indonesia.

== Religious conversions ==
=== Forced conversion of minority Hindu girls to Islam ===
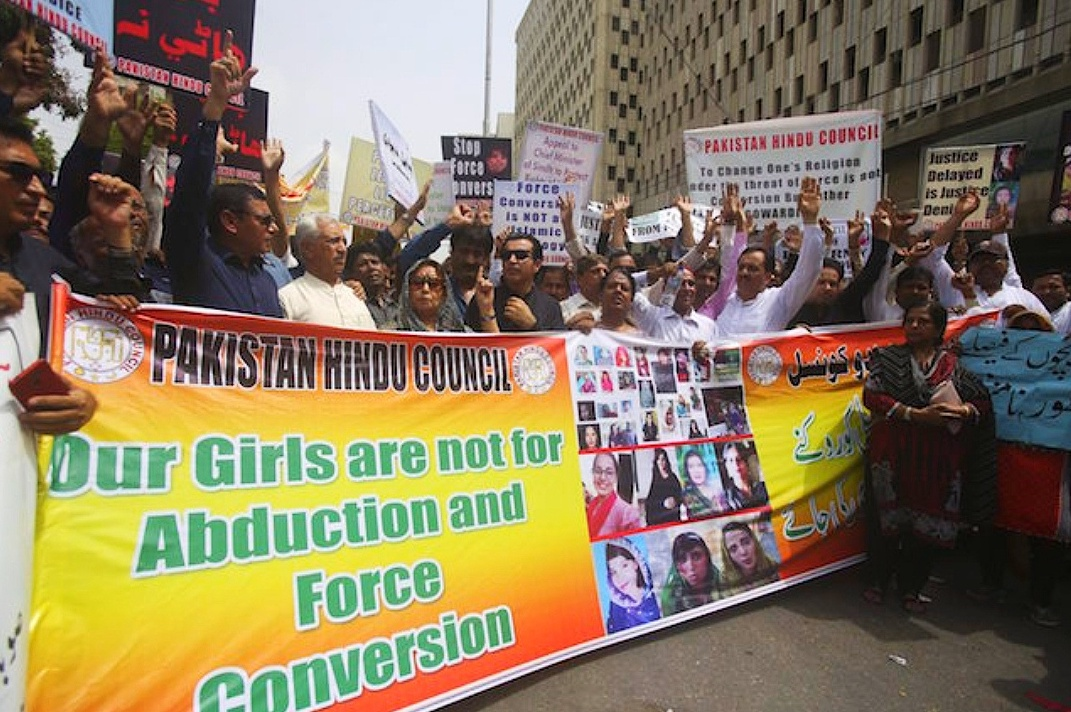
Protest against forced conversion of Hindu girls, procession conducted by Pakistan Hindu Council

One of the biggest issues the Hindu community faces in Pakistan is the forced conversion of minor Hindu girls to Islam. Religious institutions and persons like Abdul Haq (Mitthu Mian) politician and caretaker of Bharachundi Sharif Dargah in Ghotki district and Pir Ayub Jan Sirhindi, the caretaker of Dargah pir sarhandi in Umerkot District support these forced conversions and are known to have support and protection of ruling political parties of Sindh. According to the National Commission of Justice and Peace and the Pakistan Hindu Council (PHC) around 1000 non-Muslim minority women are converted to Islam and then forcibly married off. This practice is being reported increasingly in the districts of Tharparkar, Umerkot and Mirpur Khas in Sindh.

Bills have been introduced against forced conversion in legislative bodies, but it has been blocked by political parties like the Council of Islamic Ideology, Pakistan People's Party and Jamaat-e-Islami.

=== Conversions to Christianity ===
There are also Irish Christian missionaries and Ahmadiyya missionaries operating in the Thar region. The Christian and Ahmadi missionaries offer impoverished Hindus schools, health clinics etc. as an inducement for those who convert.

Korean Christian missionaries have converted more than 1,000 Hindu families in 2012 alone. According to the Sono Kangharani, a member of the Pakistan Dalit Network, the Korean missionaries have converted 200 to 250 Hindu villages between 2014 and 2016.

=== Incentivized Conversion to Islam ===
Many Hindus are induced to convert to Islam for easily getting Watan Cards and National Identification Cards. These converts were also given land and money. For example, 428 poor Hindus in Matli were converted between 2009 and 2011 by a Islamic seminary for pays off the debts of Hindus converting to Islam. Another example is the conversion of 250 Hindus to Islam in Chohar Jamali area in Thatta who were given financial help and gifts.

== Social, religious and political institutions ==
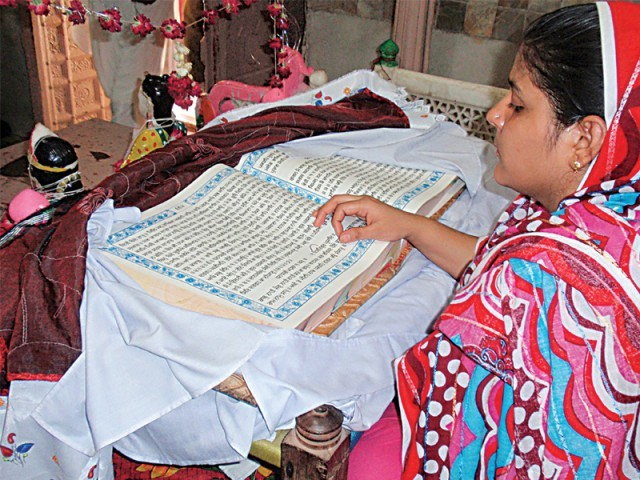
A woman reciting the Guru Granth Sahib at the Sadh Belo temple on the special occasion of the 150th death anniversary of Baba Bhankandi Maharaj

The Pakistan Hindu Panchayat and Pakistan Hindu Council are the major Hindu organisations in Pakistan. Pakistan Hindu Panchayat works for temple management and Hindu community services while Pakistan Hindu Council works for religious freedom and runs 13 schools across Tharparkar and also conducts mass wedding of poor Hindu couples.

Other organisations include Pakistan Hindu Youth Council, Pakistani Hindu Welfare Association, Shiv Temple Society of Hazara, which especially represents community interests in the Hazara region of Khyber Pakhtunkhwa, in addition to being the special guardians of the Shiva temple, at Chitti Gatti village, near Mansehra. The Dalit Sujag Tehreek is a Scheduled Caste Hindu movement representing the scheduled caste Hindu communities like Kolhi, Bheel, Meghwar, Oad, Bhagri etc.

ISKCON also has a presence in Pakistan. It is involved in preaching and distributing Urdu translated Bhagavad Gita. It has a large following among the Scheduled Caste Hindus in Urban areas of Pakistan. There is a significant increase in the influence of ISKCON due to its rejection of caste system. Iskcon has been conducting Rathayatras since 2015.

There was a Ministry of Minority Affairs in the Government of Pakistan which looked after specific issues concerning Pakistani religious minorities. In 2011, the Government of Pakistan closed the Ministry of Minority Affairs. And a new ministry Ministry for National Harmony was formed for the protection of the rights of the minorities in Pakistan. But in 2013, the Ministry of National Harmony was merged with the Ministry of Religious Affairs forming the Ministry of Religious Affairs and Inter-faith Harmony, despite opposition from the minorities.

=== Pakistan Army ===
Between 1947 and 2000, a policy of restricting Hindus prior enlisting in the Pakistan Army was in practice until the policy was reversed by the federal government. In 2006, army recruiters began recruiting Hindus into the army and people of all faith or no faith can be promoted to any rank or commanding position in the army. Pakistani Hindus have served in the Pakistan Armed Forces, with milestones including Captain Danish as the first Hindu officer commissioned in 2006, Major Dr Kelash Kumar and Major Dr Aneel Kumar as the first Hindu officers promoted to Lieutenant Colonel in 2022, and Dev Anand as the first Hindu pilot officer in the Pakistan Air Force in 2023. Three notable Pakistani Hindu martyrs include Heman Das Kohli, killed in the line of duty in 2023, Lance Naik Lal Chand Rabari, killed in the line of duty in 2017 and Ashok Kumar, posthumously awarded the Tamgha‑e‑Shujaat for bravery in Waziristan in 2013.

== In politics ==
As per the data from the Election Commission of Pakistan, as of 2022 there were a total of 2.21 million Hindu voters. Hindu voters were 49% of the total in Umerkot and 46% in Tharparkar in 2018. According to estimates in religious minorities in Pakistan's elections, Hindus have a population of 50,000 or more in 11 districts. All of these are in Sindh except the Rahim Yar Khan District in Punjab.

The Constitution's Article 51(2A) provides 10 reserved seats for non-Muslims in the National Assembly, 23 reserved seats for non-Muslims in the four provincial assemblies under Article 106 and four seats for non-Muslims in the Senate of Pakistan. Conventionally, Hindus were allotted 4 or 5 seats. The number of national Assembly seats were increased from 207 in 1997, to 332 in 2002. But the number of non-Muslim reserved seats were not increased from 10. Similarly, the number of seats in Provincial Assembly of Sindh and Punjab were increased from 100 to 159 and 240 to 363 respectively, but the non-Muslim reserved seats were not increased. Although a bill for increasing minorities' seats was introduced by Ramesh Kumar Vankwani, it was not passed. Political parties Jamiat Ulema-e-Islam (F) party is against giving reserved seats for minorities.

In 1980s Zia ul-Haq introduced a system under which non-Muslims could vote for only candidates of their own religion on separate electorates for Hindus and Christians, a policy originally proposed by Islamic leader Abul A'la Maududi. Seats were reserved for minorities in the national and provincial assemblies. Government officials stated that the separate electorates system is a form of affirmative action designed to ensure minority representation, and that efforts are underway to achieve a consensus among religious minorities on this issue, but critics argued that under this system Muslim candidates no longer had any incentive to pay attention to the minorities. Hindu community leader Sudham Chand protested against the system but was murdered. In 1999, Pakistan abolished this system. Hindus and other minorities achieved a rare political victory in 2002 with the removal of separate electorates for Muslims and non-Muslims. The separate electorate system had marginalized non-Muslims by depriving them of adequate representation in the assemblies. The Pakistan Hindu Welfare Association was active by convening a national conference on the issue in December 2000. And in 2001, Hindus, Christians, and Ahmadis successfully conducted a partial boycott of the elections, culminating in the abolishment of the separate electorate system in 2002. This allowed religious minorities to vote for mainstream seats in the National and Provincial assemblies, rather than being confined to voting for only minority seats. Despite the victory, however, Hindus still remain largely disenfranchised.

=== Senate (Upper House) ===
There are 4 seats reserved for minorities in the Pakistan Senate. In 2006, Ratna Bhagwandas Chawla became the first Hindu woman elected to the Senate of Pakistan, followed by Krishna Kumari Kohli in 2018, who is also the first women from the Sceduled caste community to get elected to Senate.

=== National Assembly (Lower House) ===
The Constitution's Article 51(2A) provides 10 reserved seats for non-Muslims in the National Assembly. In 2018, Pakistan general election Mahesh Kumar Malani became the first Hindu candidate who won a general seat in Pakistan National Assembly 2018. He won the seat from Tharparkar-II and thus became the first non-Muslim to win a general seat (non-reserved) in Pakistan national assembly.

=== Provincial Assemblies ===
The Article 106 provides 24 reserved seats for non-Muslims in the four provincial assemblies- Sindh (9), Punjab (8), Khyber Pakhtunkhwa (4), Balochistan (3). In the Sindh provincial assembly election which took place along with the Pakistan National Assembly election 2018, Hari Ram Kishori Lal and Giyan Chand Essrani were elected from the Sindh provincial assembly seats. They became the first non-Muslims to win a general seat (non-reserved) in a provincial assembly election.

== Hindu communities ==
=== Sindhi Hindus ===
Sindhi Hindus are the biggest groups of Hindus in Pakistan and majority of the Hindus, resides in the Sindh province. A large population of them have migrated to India after the partition. Historically, Sindhi Hindus have embraced forms of religious syncretism, through revering Sufi saints and respecting teachings of Guru Nanak but without necessarily following the other gurus. A large fraction of Sindhi Hindus are Nanakpanthis who revere Guru Nanak, the founder of Sikhism along with Hindu gods.

=== Tamil Hindus ===
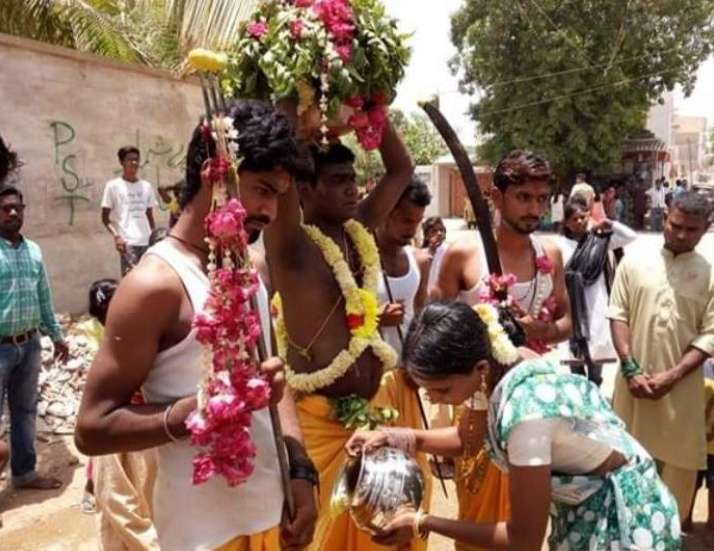
Tamil Hindus celebrating a religious festival in Karachi

Some Tamil Hindu families migrated to Pakistan in the early 20th century, when Karachi was developed during the British Raj, and were later joined by Sri Lankan Tamils who arrived during the Sri Lankan Civil War. The Madrasi Para area is home to around 100 Tamil Hindu families. The Maripata Mariamman Temple, which has been demolished, was the biggest Tamil Hindu temple in Karachi. The Drigh Road and Korangi also have a small Tamil Hindu population.

=== Kalasha people ===
The Kalasha people practice a religion which is based on an older set of Ancient Hinduism, but which has some Vedic influence, alongside animism and shamanism. Though having some cultural and religious similarities to the Hindus, they are considered a separate ethnic religion people by the government of Pakistan. They reside in the Chitral District of Khyber-Pakhtunkhwa province.

=== Baloch Hindus ===
Only a minority of Baloch people follows Hinduism. There are ethnic Hindu Balochs among the Bugti, Marri, Rind, Bezenjo, Zehri, Mengal, and other Baloch tribes. They also live under the Balochi tribal system.

=== Balmiki Hindus ===
The Valmiki or Balmikis are Hindu worshippers of Valmiki, the author of The Ramayana. Most Valmiki Hindus converted to either Christianity or Islam after the partition. However, many of those who converted still worship Valmiki and celebrate Valmiki Jayanti. One of the major temple dedicated to Valmiki in Pakistan include the 1200 year old Valmiki Mandir in Lahore. Most of the Balmikis (or Valmikis) belonged to the Schedule Caste.

=== Pashtun Hindus ===
In the early times, before the Islamic conquest of Afghanistan, most of the modern-day Pashtun people followed to the Hindu Religion. Though due to the repeated Islamic invasion in the Pakhtun areas, most of them have converted to Islam or migrated to other parts of the Asia. Still, there is a small Pashtun Hindu community, known as the Sheen Khalai meaning 'blue skinned' (referring to the color of Pashtun women's facial tattoos), migrated to Unniara, Rajasthan, India after partition. Prior to 1947, the community resided in the Quetta, Loralai and Maikhter regions of the British Indian province of Baluchistan. They are mainly members of the Pashtun Kakar tribe. Today, they continue to speak Pashto and celebrate Pashtun culture through the Attan dance. Currently in Balochistan there are Pashtun Hindus. They are called Sanzari Hindu, which is a Hindu sub-tribe of Kakar Sanzarkhel pashtun tribe. The Chaman city situated in the Afghan border also hosts Pashtun Hindu community.

=== Punjabi Hindus ===
There is a small population of Punjabi Hindus living in the Punjab province of Pakistan, most notably in Lahore where there are some 200 Hindu families. Though most of the Punjabi Hindus migrated en masse to India after the partition of India in 1947. In the modern times most of the Punjabi Hindus are settled in United States, Germany, England, Canada and Australia due to their mass migration (or diaspora). A small proportion of Afghan Punjabis are also there in Pakistan in Balochistan and Punjab, majority of them are Hindus who migrated from Afghanistan mainly after conflict due to the persecution of Taliban and religious fanatics.

== Community life and status ==
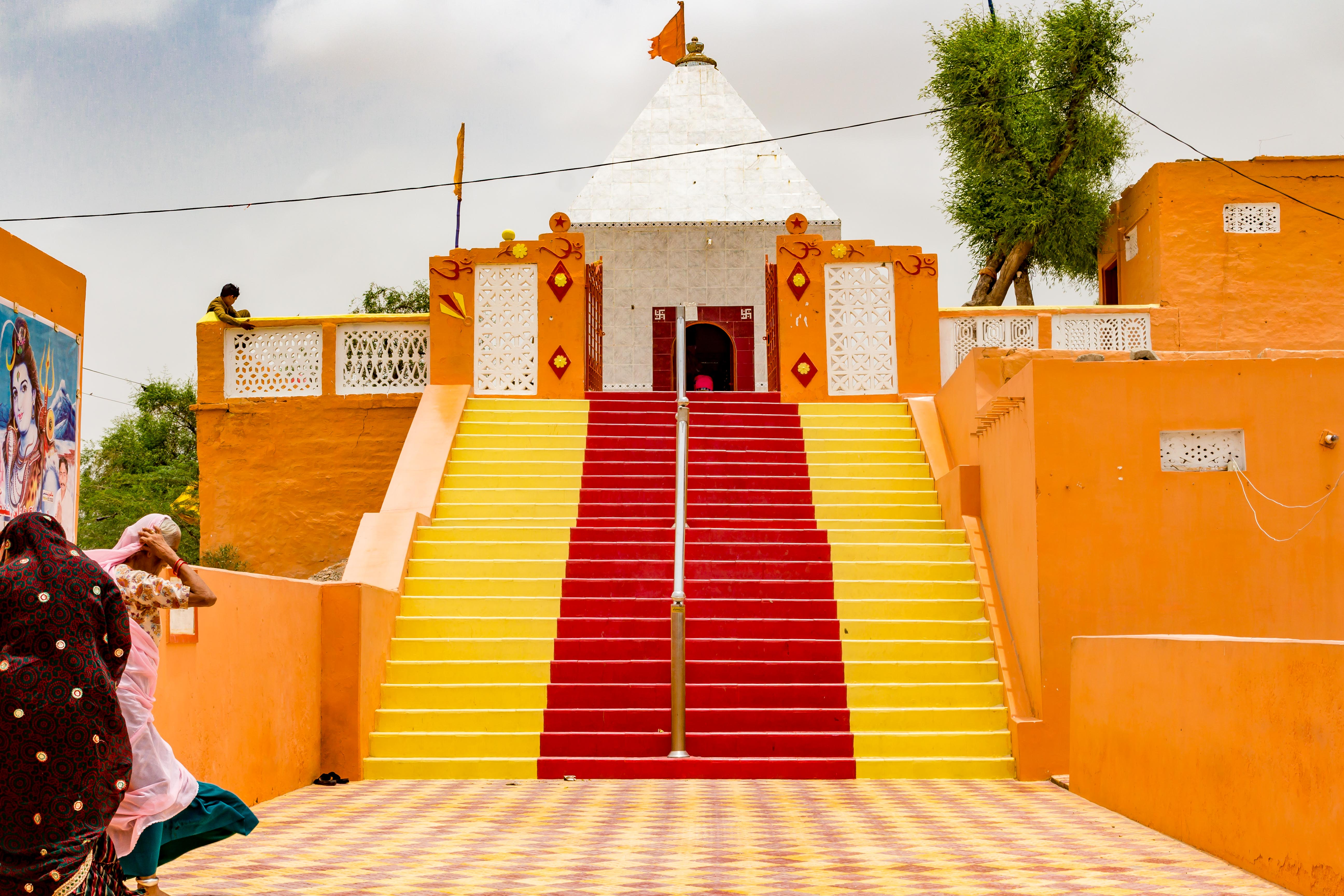
Umarkot Shiv Mandir in Umarkot is famous for the three-day Shivarathri celebration, which is attended by around 250,000 people.

According to a study on Scheduled Caste Hindus in Pakistan, the majority of scheduled caste Hindus (79%) in Pakistan have experienced discrimination. This discrimination is higher in southern Punjab (86.5%), compared to the rest of the country. The study found that majority (91.5%) of the respondents in Rahimyar Khan, Bahawalpur, Tharparkar and Umerkot districts believed that political parties are not giving importance to them.

In Balochistan province, Hindus are relatively more secure and face less religious persecution. The tribal chiefs in Balochistan, particularly the Jams of Lasbela and Bugti of Dera Bugti, consider non-Muslims like Hindus as members of their own extended family and allows religious freedom. They have never forced Hindus to convert. Also, in Balochistan Hindu places of worship are proportionate to their population. For example, between Uthal and Bela jurisdiction in Lasbela District, there are 18 temples for 5,000 Hindus living in the area, which is an indicator of religious freedom. However, in Khuzdar District and Kalat District, Hindus face discrimination.

In Peshawar, capital of Khyber Pakhtunkhwa, Hindus enjoy religious freedom and live peacefully alongside the Muslims. The city of Peshawar today is home to four Hindu tribes – the Balmiks, the Rajputs, the Heer Ratan Raths and the Bhai Joga Singh Gurdwara community. Since partition, the four tribes have lived in harmony with all religious communities including Muslims. However, there is the lack of upkeep of the dilapidated Hindu temples in the city. The local government always fails to assign caretakers and priests at temples. But in other parts of Kyber Pakhtunkhwa like Buner, Swat and Aurakzai Agencies, Hindu and Sikh families, have been targeted by Taliban for failing to pay Jizya (religious tax) and due to this more than 150 Sikhs and Hindu families in Pakistan's have moved to Hasan Abdal and Rawalpindi in Punjab in 2009

In central Punjab, Hindus are a small minority. After the partition, Hindus have been converting to Islam under pressure, particularly in Doda village near Sargodha. Due to the low population of Hindus in the Central Punjab, many of the Hindus have married Sikhs and vice versa. Intermarriages between the Hindus and Sikhs are very common there.

The Indus river is a holy river to many Hindus, and the Government of Pakistan periodically allows small groups of Hindus from India to make pilgrimage and take part in festivities in Sindh and Punjab. Rich Pakistani Hindus go to India and release their loved ones' remains into the Ganges. Those who cannot afford the trip go to Churrio Jabal Durga Mata temple in Nagarparkar.

=== Education and literacy rates ===
According to Pakistan's National Council for Justice and Peace (NCJP) report the average literacy rate among Hindu (upper caste) is 34 percent, Hindu Scheduled Caste is 19 percent, compared to the national average of 46.56 percent. According to a 2013 survey conducted by the Pakistan Hindu Seva Welfare Trust, the literacy rate among Scheduled Caste Hindus in Pakistan is just 16%. The survey noted that majority of the scheduled caste Hindu families do not send their girl children to schools due to the fear of forced conversion.

=== Hindu marriage acts and laws ===
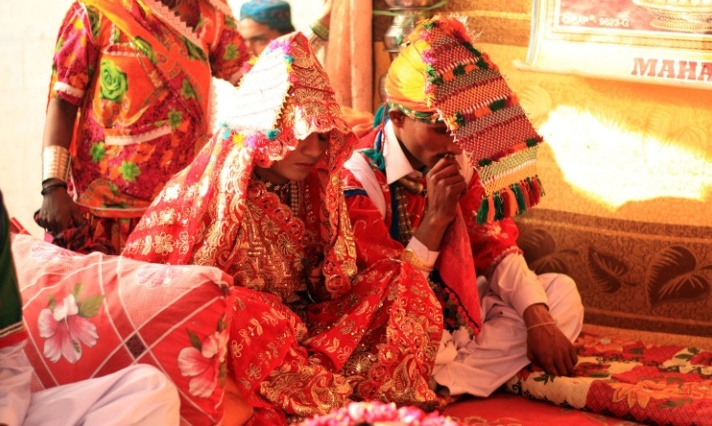
A Hindu marriage in Pakistan

There are two laws governing Hindu marriages-Sindh Hindu Marriage act of 2016 (applicable only in the Sindh province), Hindu Marriage Act of 2017 (applicable in Islamabad Capital Territory, Balochistan, Khyber-Pakhtunkhwa and Punjab provinces).

The Sindh Hindu Marriage Bill was passed by the Provincial Assembly of Sindh in February 2016. This was the first Hindu Marriage act in Pakistan. It was amended in 2018 to include divorce rights, remarriage rights and financial security of the wife and children after divorce.

At federal level, a Hindu Marriage Bill was proposed in 2016, which was unanimously approved by the National Assembly of Pakistan in 2016 and by the Senate of Pakistan in 2017. In March 2017, the Pakistani President Mamnoon Hussain signed the Hindu Marriage Bill and thereby making it a law. Prime Minister Nawaz Sharif also mentioned that the marriage registrars will be established in areas where Hindus stay. However, many have criticised the Clause 12(iii) of the Hindu Marriage Bill which says that "a marriage will be annulled if any of the spouses converts to another religion".

== Temples ==
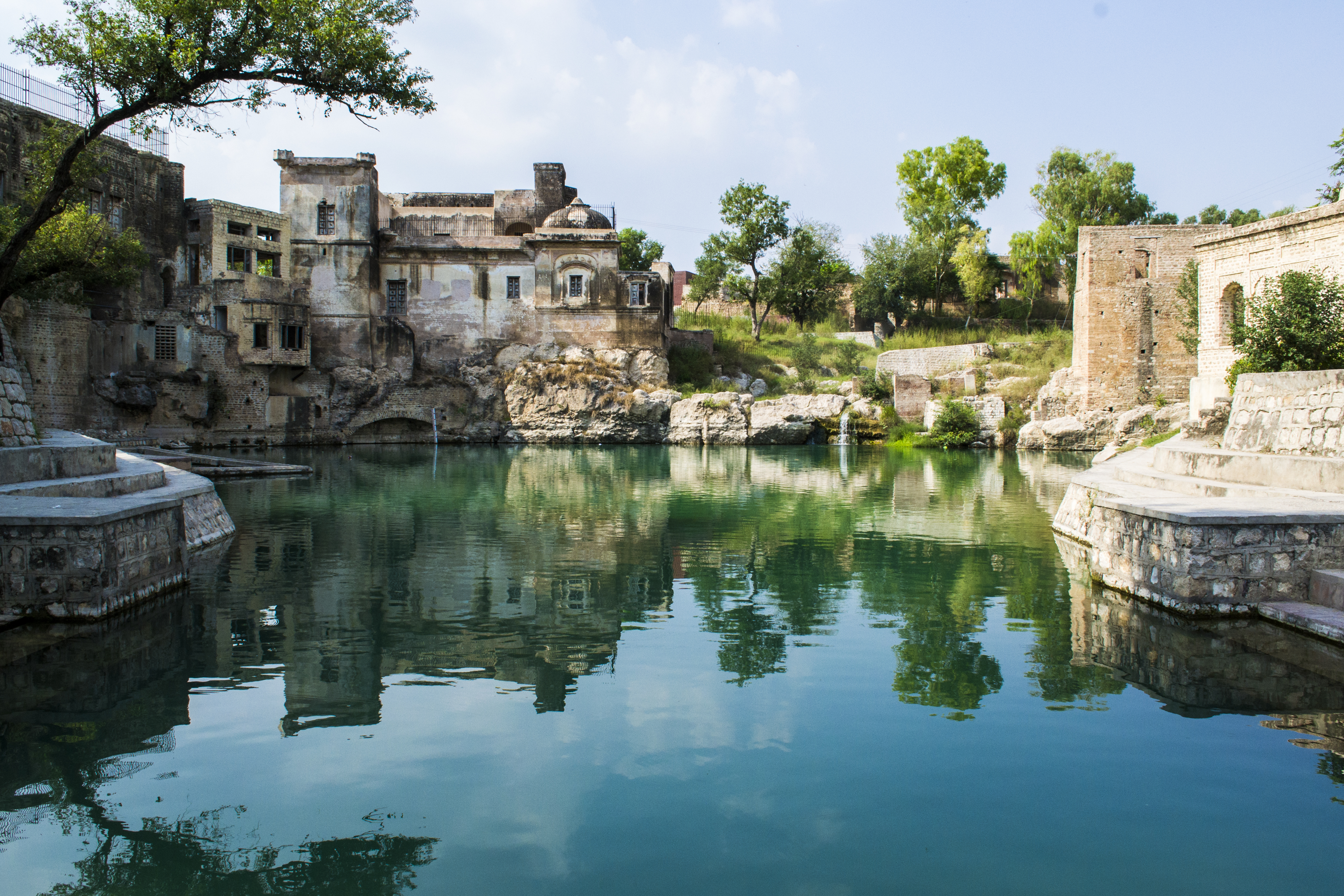
The Katas Raj Temples surrounding a sacred pond in Punjab

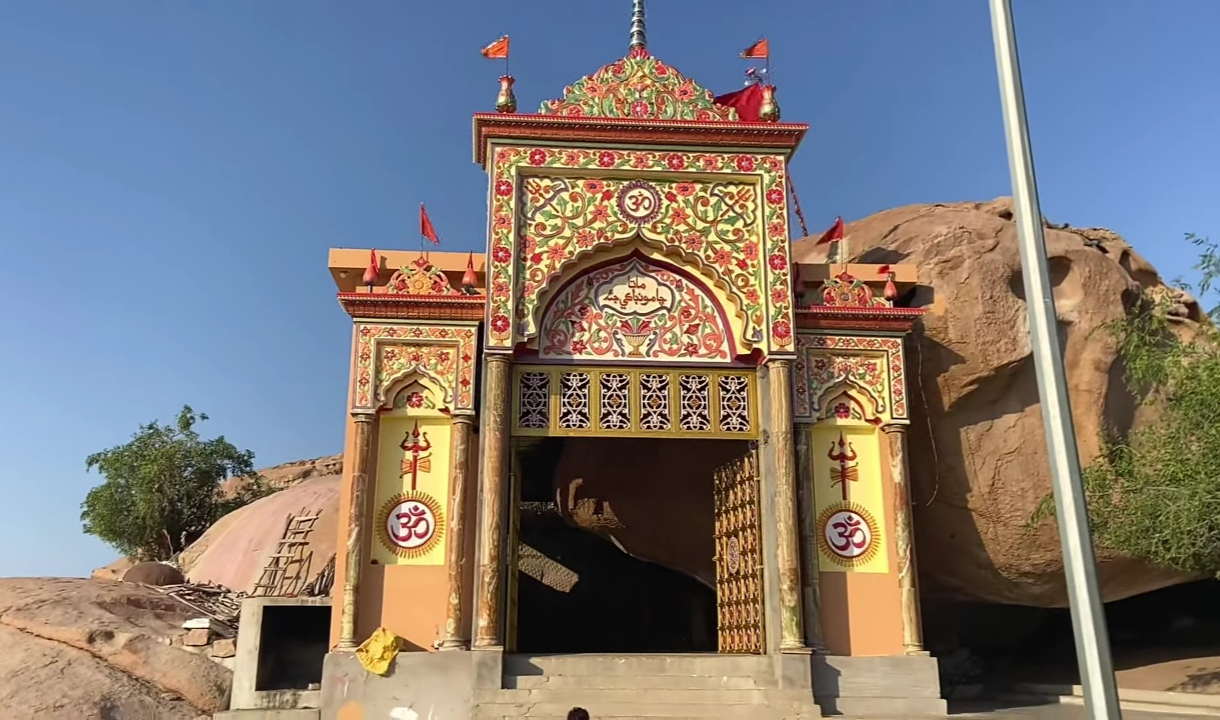
Churrio Jabal Durga Mata Temple, Tharparkar

The Communal violence of the 1940s and the subsequent persecutions have resulted in the destruction of many Hindu temples in Pakistan, although the Hindu community and the Government of Pakistan have preserved and protected many prominent ones. Some ancient Hindu temples in Pakistan draw devotees from across faiths including Muslims.

According to a survey, there were 428 Hindu temples in Pakistan at the time of Partition and 408 of them were now turned into toy stores, restaurants, government offices and schools. Among these 11 temples are in Sindh, four in Punjab, three in Balochistan and two in Khyber Pakhtunkhwa. However, in November 2019, government of Pakistan started the restoration process for 400 Hindu temples in Pakistan. After restoration, the temples will be reopened to Hindus in Pakistan.

The Pamwal Das Shiv Mandir, centuries-old historic temple in Baghdadi area of Lyari Town was illegally turned into a Muslim Pir and slaughterhouse for cows by Muslim clerics with the help of Baghdadi police after making series of attacks on Hindu families living in the area. The 135,000 acres of temple land is now controlled by the Evacuee Trust Property Board. Many of the historic temples like the Kali Bari Hindu Temple in Dera Ismail Khan, Ram Mandir Complex, Bhuwan temple complex in Chakwal etc has been converted to hotels or picnic spots for commercial purposes. The Shiv Temple in Kohat has been converted into a government primary school.

According to a report issued by a one-man commission to the Supreme Court in February 2021, out of 365 Hindu temples built before partition in Pakistan, 13 are being managed by the Evacuee Trust Property Board, 65 are being managed by the Hindu community, and the remainder of 287 have been abandoned to land mafias.

=== Reopened temples ===
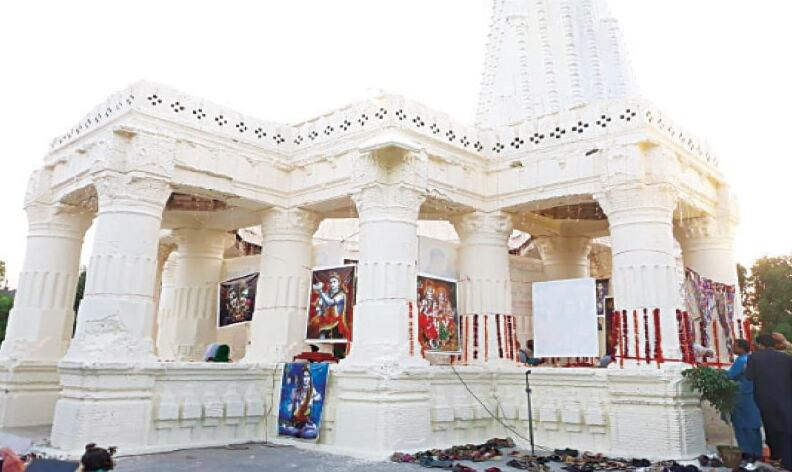
Shawala Teja Singh Temple after Renovation by the Government

The Goraknath Temple which was closed in the 1947 was reopened in 2011 after a court ruling which ordered the Evacuee Trust Property Board to open it. Some temples were reopened and renovated in a public-private partnership like the Darya Lal Mandir in Karachi.

In 2019, the Pakistan Prime Minister Imran Khan said that his government will reclaim and restore 400 temples to Hindus. Following this, the 1,000-Year-Old Shivala Teja Singh temple in Sialkot (which was closed for 72 years) and a 100-year-old Hindu temple in Balochistan was reopened.

=== Major Pilgrimage centres ===
- Shri Hinglaj Mata temple – Shakta pitha in Pakistan. The annual pilgrimage to the temple is the largest one in Pakistan. Nearly 300,000 people take part in the pilgrimage during the spring.
- Shri Ramdev Pir temple in Tando Allahyar District, in Sindh. The annual Ramdevpir mela in the temple is the second largest Hindu pilgrimage in Pakistan.
- Umarkot Shiv Mandir –The three-day Shivrathri festival in the temple is famous. It is one of the biggest religious festivals in the country. It is attended by around 250,000 people. All the expenses were borne by the Pakistan Hindu Panchayat.
- Churrio Jabal Durga Mata Temple – Famous for Shivrathri celebrations which is attended by 200,000 pilgrims. Hindus cremate the dead and ashes are preserved till Shivratri for immersion in into the holy water in Churrio Jabal Durga Mata Temple.

=== Riots, attacks and destruction of temples ===
- In 2006, a Hindu temple in Lahore was destroyed to pave the way for construction of a multi-storied commercial building. When reporters from Pakistan-based newspaper Dawn tried to cover the incident, they were accosted by the henchmen of the property developer, who denied that a Hindu temple existed at the site.
- In January 2014, a policeman standing guard outside a Hindu temple at Peshawar was gunned down. 25 March 2014 Express Tribune citing an All Pakistan Hindu Rights Movement (PHRM) survey said that 95% of all Hindu temples in Pakistan have been converted since 1990. Pakistani Muslims have attacked Hindu temples if anything happens to any mosque in neighbouring India.
- In 2014, a Hindu temple and a dharmashala in Larkana district in Sindh was attacked by a crowd of Muslims.
- In 2019, three Hindu temples were vandalised in Ghotki district in Sindh over blasphemy accusations.
- In 2019, a Hindu temple Pakistan's southern Sindh province was vandalism by miscreants, and they set fire to holy books and idols inside the temple.
- In January 2020, a Hindu temple in Chachro, Tharparkar district in Sindh was vandalised by miscreants, who desecrated the idols and set fire to holy scriptures.
- In December 2020, a Hindu temple in Teri village of Karak district was attacked and vandalised.
- In August 2021, a Hindu Temple in Rahim Yar Khan in Punjab province of Pakistan was attacked by a Muslim Mob, burning down parts of it and damaging idols.
- In July 2023, a Hindu temple was attacked with rocket launchers by a gang of dacoits in the Southern Sindh Province of Pakistan on July 16, in the second such incident of vandalism of a place of worship belonging to the minority community in less than two days. The assailants attacked the small temple built by the local Hindu community and adjoining homes belonging to members of the minority community in the city of Kashmore in Sindh. The attack came after the Mari Mata Temple in Karachi's Soldier Bazar was razed to the ground by bulldozers in the presence of a heavy contingent of police force late on Friday night. The temple believed to be nearly 150 years ago was demolished after being declared an old and dangerous structure in Karachi, the provincial capital of Sindh Province.

== Education curriculum ==
A 2005 report by the National Commission for Justice and Peace, a non-profit organization, found that Pakistan Studies textbooks in Pakistan have been used to articulate the hatred that Pakistani policy-makers have attempted to inculcate towards the Hindus. "From the government-issued textbooks, students are taught that Hindus are backward and superstitious", the report stated. Hindu students are often forced to study as per the Islamic curriculum. It has been reported that students are taught hatred against the Hindus in Pakistan's school. While speaking at the UN Working Group on Durban Declaration and Plan of Action in Genava, Munir Mengal, the president of Baloch Voice Association said, "I used to go to school in a very high standard state-run Army school called Cadet College the first lesson to us was Hindus are Kafirs, Jews are enemies of Islam both are liable to death for no other reason". He added, "Even today the same is the first most important and basic message from uniformed Army teachers that we have to respect guns and bombs because we have to use these against Hindu mothers to kill them otherwise they will give birth to a Hindu child".

In 1975, Islamiat or Islamic studies was made compulsory, resulting that a large number of minority students being forced to study Islamic Studies. In 2015, Khyber Pakhtunkhwa government introduced Ethics as an alternative subject to Islamiat for non-Muslim school children in the province followed by Sindh in 2016.

=== Post 2021 ===
In 2021, Single National Curriculum (SNC) was adopted by the Pakistan government in which instead of Islamiat for Muslims, the Non-Muslim students belonging to Hindu, Christian, Sikh, Kalash and Bahai religions will be taught separate books on their religion separately. As per the new Curriculum, Hindu students from Grade 1 to 12 will study about:

- Beliefs and Practices like Om symbol, Dharma, Moksha, Karma yoga, Bhakti yoga, arti song Om Jai Jagadeesh with meaning
- 4 Purusharthas
- Hindu scriptures- Ramayana, Mahabaratha and Bhagavad Gita
- Hindu celebrations (like Ram Navami, Diwali, Cheti Chand, Janmashtami),
- Hindu deities (like Ganesh, Jhulelal, Sita),
- Hindu Saints like Valmiki, Mira Bai, Kabir das, Tulsi das etc
- Sacred places of Hindus in Pakistan like Sant Nenuram Ashram, Sadhu Bela, Hinglaj Mata Mandir etc

In 2026, Punjab province introduced separate religious curriculum, with the subject for Hindu students named Sanathan Dharma followed by Sindh Province.

The Brookings Institution, in a recent report evaluating the SNC, points to the phenomenon of isomorphic mimicry in which developing states "pretend to do the reforms that look like the kind of reforms that successful countries do" without actually changing much.

== Religious persecution ==
There has been a historical decline of Hinduism, Buddhism, Jainism and Sikhism in the areas of Pakistan. This happened for a variety of reasons even as these religions have continued to flourish beyond the eastern frontiers of Pakistan. The region became predominantly Muslim during the rule of Delhi Sultanate and later Mughal Empire. In general, religious conversion was a gradual process, though it is mostly attributed to the works of Sufis, some converted to Islam to gain tax relief, land grant, marriage partners, social and economic advancement, or freedom from slavery and some by force. The predominantly Muslim population supported Muslim League and Partition of India. After the independence of Pakistan in 1947, the minority Hindus and Sikhs migrated to India while the Muslims refugees from India migrated to Pakistan. Approximately 4.7 million Hindus and Sikhs moved to India while 6.5 million Muslims settled in Pakistan. Jogendranath Mandal, Pakistan's first minister of Law and Labour, left for India in 1950, 3 years after taking office, citing anti-Hindu bias by the bureaucracy. He quoted, "I have come to the conclusion that Pakistan is no place for Hindus to live in and that their future is darkened by the ominous shadow of conversion or liquidation".

Religious discrimination remains common to this day throughout the country, and Pakistan has been designated a 'Country of Particular Concern' by the United States Commission on International Religious Freedom (USCIRF) for engaging in or tolerating "systematic, ongoing, egregious violations of religious freedom". The London-based Minority Rights Group and Islamabad-based International and Sustainable Development Policy Institute state that religious minorities in Pakistan such as Hindus face "high levels of religious discrimination", and "legal and social discrimination in almost every aspect of their lives, including political participation, marriage and freedom of belief".

=== Migration motivated by religious persecution ===
Some Hindus in Pakistan feel that they are treated as second-class citizens and many have continued to migrate to India. According to the Human Rights Commission of Pakistan data, around 1,000 Hindu families fled to India in 2013. In May 2014, a member of the ruling Pakistan Muslim League-Nawaz (PML-N), Dr Ramesh Kumar Vankwani, revealed in the National Assembly of Pakistan that around 5,000 Hindus are migrating from Pakistan to India every year. The sexual harassment of Hindu girls and mocking of Hindu religious practices were also cited as reasons for migration. In 2019, India passed the Citizenship (Amendment) Act, 2019 that allows the persecuted Pakistani Hindus and Sikhs who arrived in India before the end of December 2014 to obtain Indian citizenship.

However, many Pakistani Hindus who migrated to India had returned back to Pakistan. For example, according to the official estimates by Indian government between January-July 2021, about 1,500 Pakistani Hindu refugees migrated back to Pakistan, and between January-July 2022, 334 Pakistani Hindus returned to Pakistan.

=== Discrimination, Kidnapping and attacks ===
In the aftermath of the 1992 Babri Masjid demolition in India, widespread violence erupted against Hindus. Temples and properties owned by Hindus were also attacked.

The rise of Taliban insurgency in Pakistan has been an influential and increasing factor in the persecution of non-Muslims in Pakistan. Hindus have been selectively kidnapped for ransom, with high profile cases include those of kidnapping of a priest of the Kalat Kali temple in 2018 and the chairman of the Hinglaj Mata temple in 2012.

Between 2011 and 2012, 23 Hindus were kidnapped for ransom, and 13 Hindus were killed as a part of targeted killings of non-Muslims. In January 2014, a policeman standing guard outside a Hindu temple at Peshawar was gunned down. Pakistan's Supreme Court has sought a report from the government on its efforts to ensure access for the minority Hindu community to temples – the Karachi bench of the apex court was hearing applications against the alleged denial of access to the members of the minority community.

In 2019, former Pakistani cricketer Danish Kaneria alleged mistreatment by team members and management for being a Hindu. In June 2023, the Pakistan Higher Education Commission banned the celebration of the Hindu festival Holi on institute campuses to preserve "Islamic identity" and "socio-cultural values" which flared the issue of religious discrimination in the country. The ban was later removed a month later by the education commission, following outrage on social media.

As per a written response to parliament by Indian Minister of State for External Affairs Kirti Vardhan Singh in December 2024, a total of 112 cases of violence against Hindus and other minorities have been reported in Pakistan in 2024 till October.

== See also ==
- Religion in Pakistan
- List of Hindu temples in Pakistan
- Pakistan Hindu Council
- Pakistan Hindu Panchayat
