= Pakistan Hindu Panchayat =

Socio-political representative organization of the Hindu community in Pakistan

- پاکستان ہندو پنچایت
- Formation: 2005 (21 years ago)
- Type: Religious organization
- Legal status: Foundation
- Purpose: Religious studies, Spirituality, Social Reforms
- Region served: Pakistan
- Website: aphptrustpakistan.org

The Pakistan Hindu Panchayat (abbreviated as PHP) is the leading socio-political representative organization of the Hindu community in Pakistan.

== Hindus of Pakistan ==
As per 2023 Census, Hindus form 2.14 % of the population of Pakistan, about 5.2 million people. They are mainly concentrated in Sindh where they constitutes 8.81% of population. The Hindu minority are elected to National Assembly and Senatue under Minority reserved seats.

== Mission and Organization ==
The PHP represents the Hindu community on social and political issues, bringing them together to protect their interests, advance education and opportunity and protect the basic rights and freedoms, especially of worship and assembly, of Hindus all over Pakistan. The organisation has .The organisation raises the issues raised by the Hindu community with the executive and legislative members. and protested against injustices to the community.

The PHP has protested against the forced conversion of underage Hindu girls in Pakistan, abduction of Hindu members, etc.

== Representation with Government ==
The PHP organizes support for the Hindu candidates in Hindu electorates, and lobbies the Government of Pakistan on issues important to Hindus, such as the security of temples, and contentious issues like protests against the abduction of Hindus for ransoms and forcible conversions.

The PHP holds an annual national conference, and has branches in all Pakistani provinces, champions the minority rights. Another important and linked organization is the Pakistani Hindu Welfare Association.

== Issues ==
The PHP was in a rustle with Pakistan Hindu Council for the ownership of the temple land in the Defence Housing Authority in Karachi. The land for the temple was allocated by the government in 2015. The PHP chief Ramesh Kumar Vankwani claimed that "APHP was not a true representative body of Hindus and therefore did not deserve the plot." The PHP secretary claimed that PHC doesn't have experience in managing temple and it is an NGO.

In 2016, the nomination paper of lawyer and social activist Kalpana Devi for the position of chairperson of PHP was rejected, claiming that she is a woman and only men is able to handle these matters, despite the fact that she already served as chairperson of Larkana Hindu panchayat for 3 years. She petitioned against this in the Sindh High Court. The court ruled in her favour.

== See also ==
- Pakistan Hindu Mandir Management Committee
- Dalit Sujag Tehreek
- Shri Hinglaj Mata temple
- Hinduism in Pakistan
- Hindu and Buddhist architectural heritage of Pakistan
- Pakistan Hindu Council
