= Forced religious conversion in Pakistan =

Abduction and forced religious conversion of underage minority girls in Pakistan

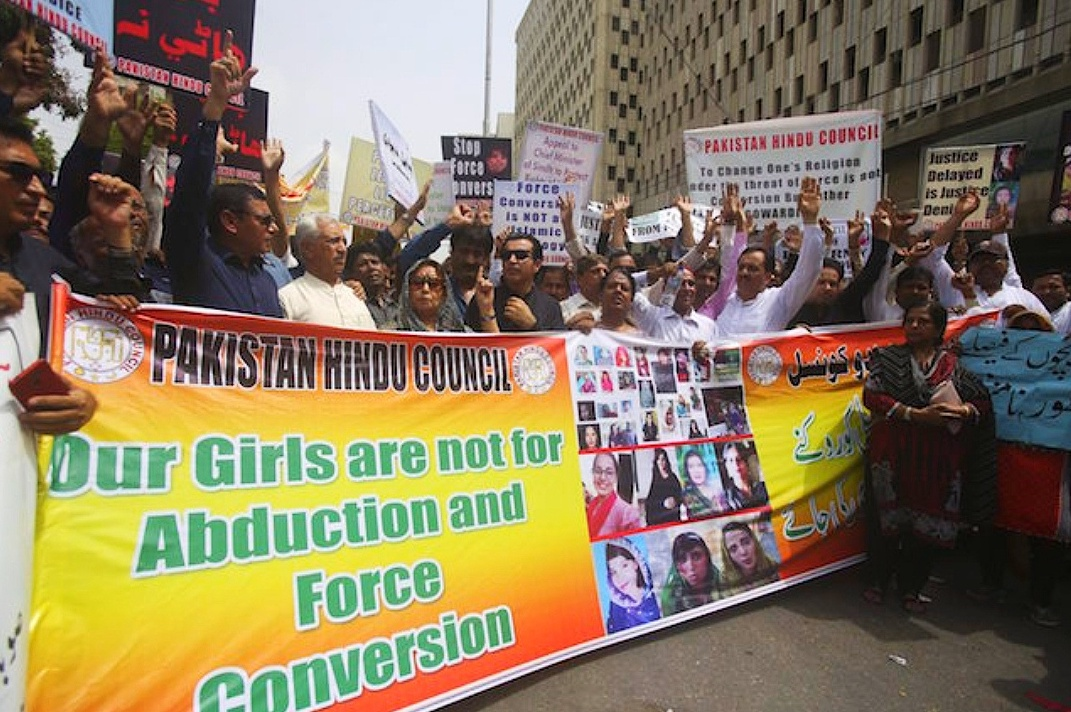
Protest against forced conversion of Hindu girls conducted by Pakistan Hindu Council

In Pakistan, girls from religious minority communities are abducted and forced into converting to Islam, often followed by forced or disputed marriages. Most of the girls affected are primarily from Hindu and Christian communities. Many of the reported victims are minors under the age of 18, including documented cases of children as young as 12, raising grave human rights and child protection concerns.

The perpetrators are typically religious extremists, some of whom may be affiliated with far-right Islamist political parties in Pakistan.

== Causes ==
Some Islamic institutions and clerics have been alleged to be involved in coercing religious minorities to convert to Islam by threatening to harm or withhold economic opportunities to members of minority groups who refuse to convert.

Some coerced conversions are results of kidnappings or violent threats while others are due to the systemic discrimination that many Hindus face in their professional, public, and private lives, and conversion is seen by many as a way to avoid religious discrimination and violence.

According to some child protection activists, the forced conversion of young girls is part of a moneymaking scheme involving corrupt public and religious figures who allow underaged girls to be converted to Islam and married to older men in exchange for money.

Jürgen Schaflechner, a cultural anthropologist specializing on Hindus in Pakistan, states that conversions are rarely motivated by religious zeal, and are instead a consequence of the commodification of and denial of agency to women in a deeply patriarchal society.

== Notable incidents ==
In May 2007, Christian citizens of Charsadda (a city which is close to the border with Afghanistan) reported that they had received letters purportedly from the Taliban threatening them with violence if they do not convert to Islam, and that the police did not take the threats seriously. In 2015, Christians in Charsadda again received threatening letters asking them to convert; in response the local police say increased security at churches.

In April 2012, three Hindu sisters were allegedly threatened into converting to Islam. Their cases were appealed all the way to the Supreme Court of Pakistan, where the appeal was admitted but has remained unheard.

=== Reno Kumari Case (2019) ===
In 2019, Reno Kumari, 15 year old Hindu girl from Sindh who was going to college in Rohri. On the way she was abducted, forcibly converted to Islam and married to a Muslim man. Her family filed case and the local court ordered to summon her. In court she said she wants to return to her family. The PTI lawmaker Ramesh Kumar said this case is unique as its the that "this is the first time a kidnapped Hindu girl has been reunited safely with her family."

== Statistics ==
According to a report by the Movement for Solidarity and Peace in Pakistan, an estimated 1000 girls are forcibly converted to Islam and married to Muslim men in every year. In 2019, a report by South Asia Partnership-Pakistan (SAP-PK) in collaboration with the Aurat Foundation, also estimates the figure of 1000 every year.

Amarnath Motumal, vice chairperson of the Human Rights Commission of Pakistan (HRCP) in 2012, states that at least 20 Hindu girls are abducted and forcibly converted each month, while emphasizing that the true scale of the problem is likely underreported due to difficulties in data collection. The Human Rights Observer 2024 report, produced by the Centre for Social Justice in Lahore, documents 34 reported cases of abduction and 102 alleged forced conversions between January and December 2023.

According to the United Nations analysis in 2025, roughly 75% of women and girls subjected to forced conversion through marriage were Hindu, while 25% were Christian. Nearly 80% of these cases took place in Sindh province. Most of these victims are in the age bracket of 14 to 18, though some victims are even younger. According to the report by Centre for Social Justice (CSJ) in 2024, 71% of the victims were minors, with under the age of 14 constituting 22 % and between the ages of 14 and 18 constituting 49 %. Only 13% of the victims were adults, and the age of the remaining 16% could not be unverified.

== Consequences ==
A survey conducted by a Pakistani Hindu organization found that a majority of scheduled caste Pakistani Hindu families do not send their female children to schools due to the fear of forced conversion and kidnapping.

According to Ramesh Kumar Vankwani, a member of the National Assembly of Pakistan, around 5,000 Hindus migrate from Pakistan to India every year due to fear of forced conversions. The Pakistan Hindu Council says that forced conversions are the primary reason for the declining Hindu population in Pakistan.

== Legality ==
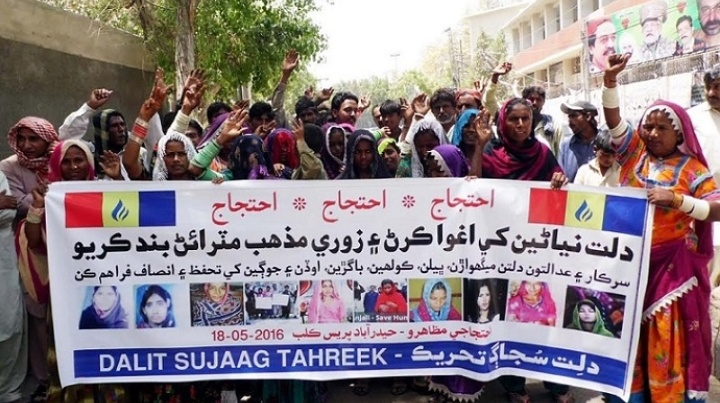
Dalit Sujag Tehreek protesting against forced conversion of Dalit Hindu girls

Pakistan lacks strong laws prohibiting coerced conversions, which has drawn criticism for allowing coerced conversions to go largely unpunished.

In November 2016, a bill prohibiting forced conversion was passed by the Sindh Provisional Assembly, punishing perpetrators with a minimum of 5 years in jail, and a fine paid to the victim. The bill was opposed by religious parties for two reasons. First, the bill prohibited any religious conversion for a person under the age of 18; critics argued children should be able to voluntary convert giving the example of Ali, who converted at the age of 10. Second, the bill imposed a 21-day waiting period for voluntary adult conversion; the religious parties also opposed this. Thus, due to pressure from religious parties, the governor did not sign the bill into law.

In 2020, a bill aimed at preventing coerced conversions was introduced in the Senate of Pakistan that could prevent forced conversions of minority girls, but it was turned down by the Senate Standing Committee on Religious Affairs and Interfaith Harmony. Krishna Kumari Kolhi, a Hindu Pakistan Peoples Party Senator, walked out of the Senate during the meeting as a form of protest.

In 2021, a bill was introduced. But it was rejected by the Ministry of Religious Affairs, Parliamentary Committee for Protection of Minorities and Council of Islamic Ideology. Senator Mushtaq Ahmed of Jamaat-e-Islami and Maulvi Faiz Ahmed of Jamiat Ulema-e-Islam (F) called the bill anti-Islam and denied forced conversions happens in Pakistan.

== Response ==
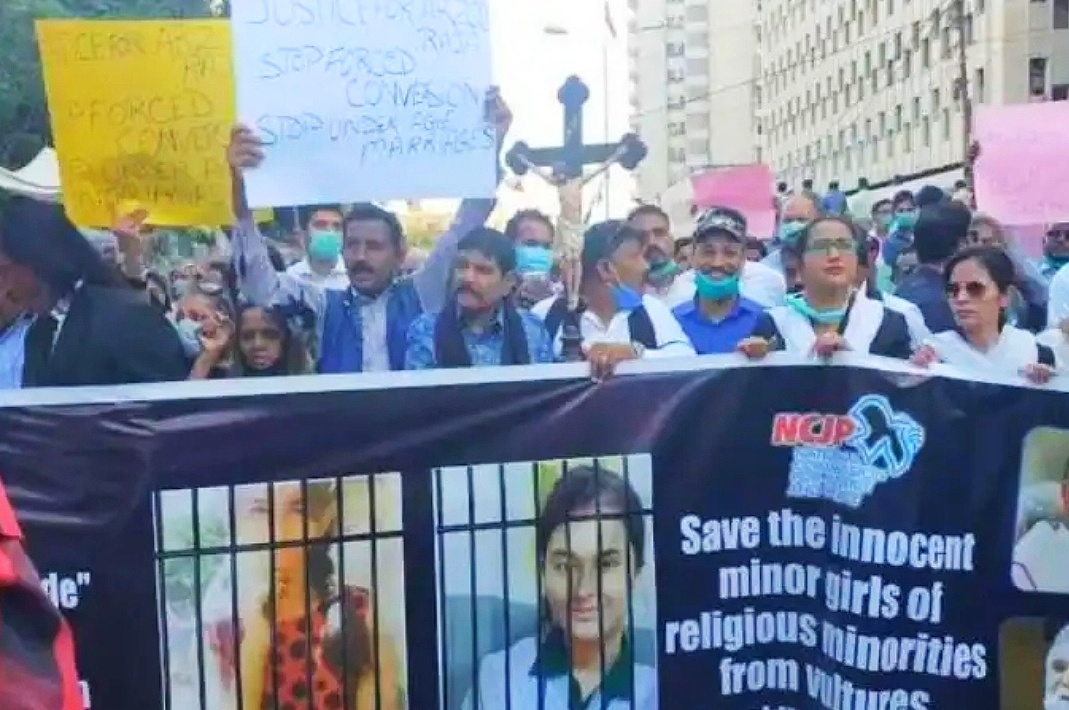
Protest against forced conversion of Christian girls in Pakistan organised by NCJP

The Pakistani Nobel Laurette Malala Yousafzai spoke against forced conversions in Pakistan and said "It should be a personal choice and no one, especially a child shouldn’t be forced to accept any faith or convert to any other religion out of the will".

The former Pakistani Prime minister Imran Khan has said that forced conversions are 'un-Islamic' and are against the commands of Allah.

=== Canada ===
Candice Bergen, the Deputy Leader of Conservative Party of Canada, has commented that "The reports coming out of Pakistan of Christian and Hindu girls being abducted, raped, forced into marriages and coerced to convert from their faith are deeply concerning and need to be addressed". She also called for the re-establishment of Office of Religious Freedom in Canada to address the issue.

=== United Nations ===
In January 2023, members of the Office of the United Nations High Commissioner for Human Rights expressed their alarm at the reported rise in kidnappings, coerced religious conversions and weddings of underaged girls from among religious minorities in Pakistan. They appealed the Government of Pakistan to stop the alleged abuse where people in their teens had been "kidnapped from their families, trafficked … far from their homes (and) made to marry men sometimes twice their age". In 2024, UN human rights experts expressed concerns for lack of protects from forced conversions. They also expressed concern that forced marriages and religious conversions of girls from minority communities were being “validated by the courts, often through the invocation of religious law, resulting in victims being kept with their abductors rather than being allowed to return to their parents.” In 2026, UN experts expressed similar concern and said "Any change of religion or belief must be genuinely free from coercion, and marriage must be based on full and free consent, which is not legally possible when the victim is a child”.

=== European Union ===
At an event organised against forced conversion, the Dutch politician and European Parliamentarian member Anja Haga, said "The human rights abuses in Pakistan are deeply alarming and require urgent attention. We cannot stand idly by while the fundamental rights of minority women and girls are violated." Swedish politician and European Parliamentarian member Charlie Weimers said "It is imperative that we work collectively to end the injustice faced by minority communities. Our role in the European Parliament is to raise awareness and advocate for change."

In 2025, EU parliament passed resolution against forced conversion of minority girls in Pakistan, who became victim of forced conversion and marriage to their abductor.

=== United States ===
In 2020, US designated Pakistan as "a country of particular concern" for religious freedom noting the report by the U.S. Commission on International Religious Freedom that minor girls from minority communities were "kidnapped for forced conversion to Islam … forcibly married and subjected to rape." In 2021, Congressman Brad Sherman highlighted the forced conversion case of Rinkel Kumari in the US legislature and also sent a letter to then president Asif Ali Zardari regarding this.

The US Commission on International Religious Freedom chair criticised Pakistan in 2026 over the issue of forced conversions of Hindu and Christian girls.

In 2026, 11 US lawmakers headed by Chris Smith sent a letter to Law and Justice Minister Azam Nazeer Tarar for taking appropriate action against the forced conversion of an 18 year old minority girl.

== In Culture ==
- The movie The Losing Side is based on the issue of forced religious conversion in the Sindh. In 2023, it bagged the award in the category of Best Human Rights Film at the Cannes World Film Festival.
- The 2023 documentary film, Hum Saya - Neighbor is on the issue of forced conversions and marriages of minority girls in Pakistan. It won the Best Short Documentary on Human Rights award at the Venice Intercultural Film Festival 2023.
- The Sindh Story is a Sindhi film on forced conversion of Hindu girls in Sindh.

== See also ==
- Asia Bibi blasphemy case
- Freedom of religion in Pakistan
- Religion in Pakistan
