= Scheduled castes in Pakistan =

Scheduled Castes in Pakistan consist of non-Muslim communities recognized as socio-economically disadvantaged and historically marginalized. To ensure social inclusion and support, the Government of Pakistan officially designated 40 castes as Scheduled Castes through Ordinance No. XVI of 1957. This recognition aims to facilitate targeted policies and programs to uplift these communities and improve their access to education, employment, and social welfare.

== History ==
The Government of India Act 1935 introduced the term "Scheduled Castes", defining the group as "such castes, parts of groups within castes, which appear to His Majesty in Council to correspond to the classes of persons formerly known as the 'Depressed Classes', as His Majesty in Council may prefer". The Scheduled Castes law was passed through Ordinance No. XVI to provide a 6% quota in employment to uplift the marginalized communities. However, the law was never implemented and was altogether abolished in favor of the quota for all minorities by the government in the late 1990s under the government of Nawaz Sharif.

== Demographics ==
The Scheduled Caste population is predominantly concentrated in Sindh province and is considered to represent a substantial segment of the country's Hindu community. Although precise population figures vary due to differences in census data and demographic estimates, it is generally considered that Scheduled Castes make up about 90-95% of the Hindu population there.

Hindus are estimated to account for 1.85% of Pakistan's total population, translating to roughly 4 million people. Given that Scheduled Castes constitute a majority within this group, their population is estimated to be between 3.6 million to 3.8 million individuals.

== List of scheduled castes ==
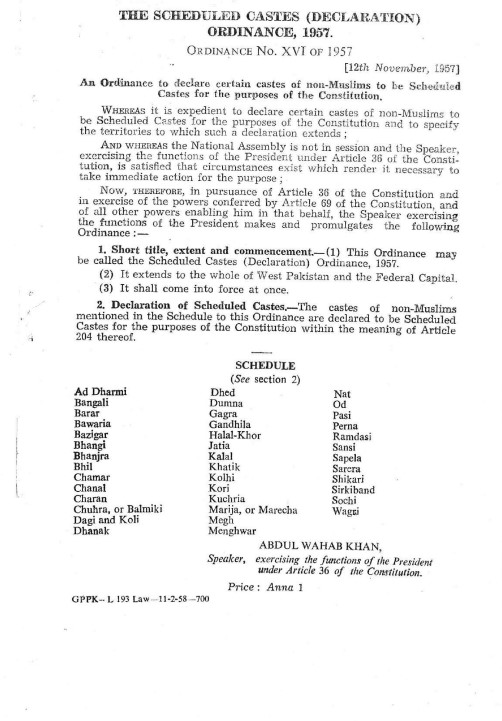
Constitution of Pakistan Scheduled Caste Ordinance 1957

Scheduled castes:

1. Ad Dharmi
2. Bangali
3. Barar
4. Bawaria
5. Bazigar
6. Bhangi
7. Bhanjra
8. Bhil
9. Chmar
10. Chanal
11. Charan
12. Chuhra or Balmiki
13. Dagi and Koli
14. Dhanak
15. Dhed
16. Dumna
17. Gagra
18. Gandhila
19. Halal-Khor
20. Jatia
21. Kalal
22. Khatik
23. Kolhi
24. Kori
25. Kuchria
26. Mareja or Marecha
27. Megh (Meghwar)
28. Menghwar
29. Nat
30. Odh
31. Pasi
32. Perna
33. Ramdasi
34. Sansi
35. Sapela
36. Sarera
37. Shikari
38. Sirkiband
39. Sochi
40. Wagri

== See also ==
- Scheduled Castes and Scheduled Tribes in India
- Dalit Sujag Tehreek
