= Molvi Faiz Muhammad =

Pakistani politician

Senator Molvi Faiz

Member of the Senate of Pakistan
- Incumbent
- Assumed office 12 March 2018

Personal details
- Party: Jamiat Ulema-e Islam (F)

Molvi Faiz Muhammad is a Pakistani politician who has been a Member of the Senate of Pakistan, since March 2018.

== Political career ==
Muhammad was elected to the Senate of Pakistan as a candidate of Jamiat Ulema-e Islam (F) on general seat from Balochistan in the 2018 Pakistani Senate election. He took oath as Senator on 12 March 2018.
