= Pakistan Hindu Council =

Representative body of Pakistani Hindus

Pakistan Hindu Council پاکستان ہندو کونسل
- Official logo
- Abbreviation: PHC
- Formation: 2005 (21 years ago)
- Founder: Ramesh Kumar Vankwani
- Type: Religious organization
- Legal status: Foundation
- Purpose: Religious studies, Spirituality, Social Reforms
- Region served: Pakistan
- Website: pakistanhinducouncil.org.pk

Pakistan Hindu Council (Urdu: پاکستان ہندو کونسل) is a non-profit organization founded in 2005 by Ramesh Kumar Vankwani. The council aims to promote interfaith harmony between various religions.

== History ==
The Pakistan Hindu Council was founded by Ramesh Kumar Vankwani, Hindu activist and member of the National Assembly of Pakistan. It was registered in 2005.

== Mission and Organization ==
The Pakistan Hindu Council represents the Pakistani Hindu community on social and political issues and aims to protect the basic rights and freedoms, especially of worship and assembly, of Hindus all over Pakistan.

=== PHC schools ===
Currently, Pakistan Hindu Council is running 17 schools across Tharparkar District, where as many as 1200 students are getting an education.

=== Mass wedding ===
The Pakistan Hindu Council organises mass wedding for poor Hindu couples annually. Around 1,100 couples have tied the knot through these ceremonies over the last eleven years.

=== Others ===
PHC also organises job fair which is open to all religious communities to join.

== Governing body ==
The governing body has 15 seats, contested by the Hindus all over the Pakistan.

== Minority Rights ==
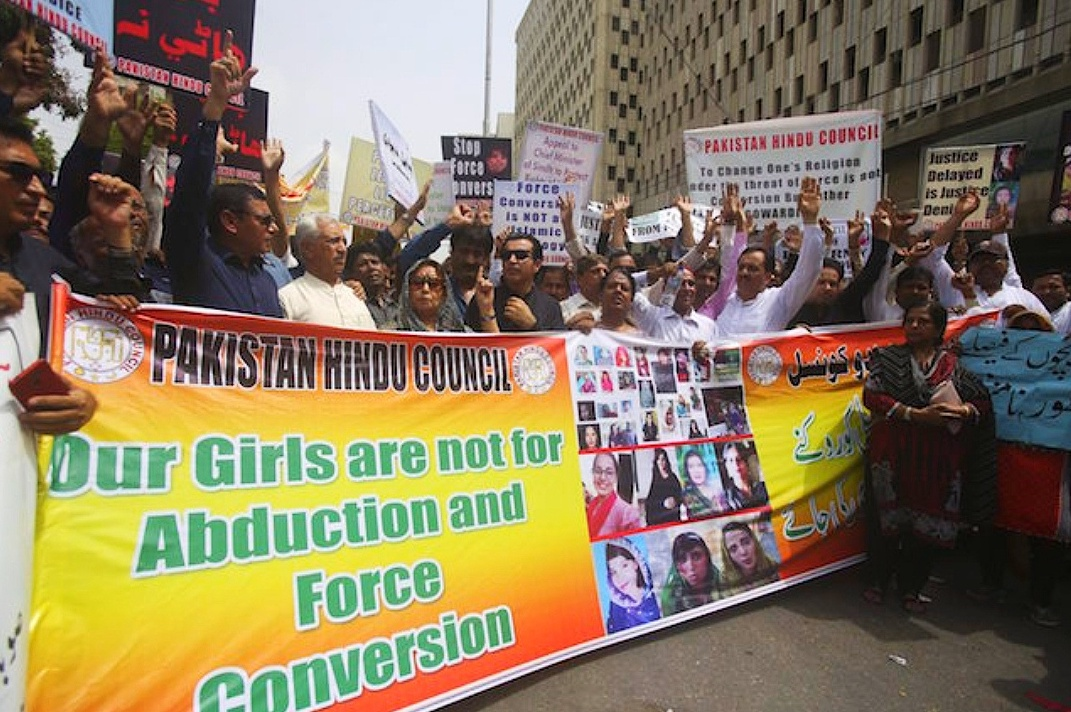
Protest against forced conversion of Hindu girls conducted by Pakistan Hindu Council

The council champions the Hindu's minority rights and it has been in the news for raising these issues including against the kidnapping, rape and forced conversions of Hindu girls.

== Collaboration ==
The Pakistan Hindu Council actively seeks cooperation of other like-minded organizations and individuals to protect minorities's rights and raise awareness.

With the technical assistance of the Press Network of Pakistan, an Islamabad-based media house, a nationwide photo contest has been organized under the subject "All Pakistan Minorities Heritage Photo Contest" seeking photos from Pakistani nationals related to Non-Muslim religious heritage sites of worship, including Hindu, Christian, Sikh, Buddhist, Jain, Parsi and others.

== See also ==
- Pakistan Hindu Mandir Management Committee
- Dalit Sujag Tehreek
- Hinduism in Pakistan
- Hindu and Buddhist architectural heritage of Pakistan
- Pakistan Hindu Panchayat
- Evacuee Trust Property Board
- List of Hindu temples in Pakistan
- Shri Hinglaj Mata temple
