= Dalit Sujag Tehreek =

Pakistani scheduled caste representatives

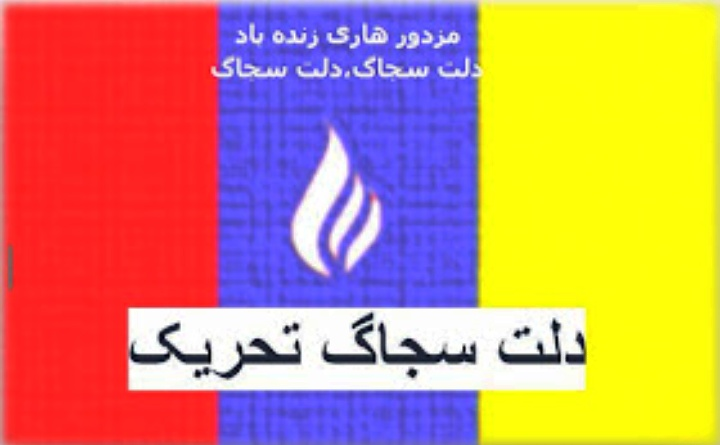
- Dalit Sujag Tehreek flag
- Abbreviation: DST
- Formation: 2016 (10 years ago)
- Type: Religio-political organization
- Legal status: Foundation
- Purpose: Social Reforms, Political rights
- Region served: Pakistan
- Chairman: Radha Bheel
- Convener: Dr Sono Khangarani
- Vice-chairperson: Manga Ram Oad and Vesaki Mal Bhagri
- Main organ: 21 member Core Committee

The Dalit Sujag Tehreek (DST) is a movement and organisation representing the scheduled caste Hindu communities in Pakistan. Its core committee consists of 21 people from different scheduled caste Hindu communities such as Kolhi, Bheel, Meghwar, Oad, Bhagri.

== History ==
The movement was launched in 2016 during the 125th anniversary of the birth of Baba Saheb Ambedkar at Mirpurkhas. It was formed by the combination of different Scheduled Caste organisations in Pakistan like Bheel Intellectual Forum (BIF), Oad Samaji Tanzeem, Pakistan Meghwar Council, Baghri Welfare Association, All Sindh Kolhi Association, Sindh Kolhi Itehad (Nemdas group), Sindh Kolhi Itehad (Ranshal Group), Qaumi Awami Tehreek and the Scheduled Caste Federation of Pakistan (SCFP). It was launched as a campaign against social discrimination faced by scheduled caste Hindus in Pakistan from both Muslims and upper caste Hindus.

Although Scheduled caste Hindus form majority of the Hindu population in Pakistan, they are underrepresented in the political sphere. According to the Radha Bheel the Pakistan Hindu Council (PHC) has about 2,000 Hindu members, among them only 7 are from Scheduled Castes.

== Activities ==
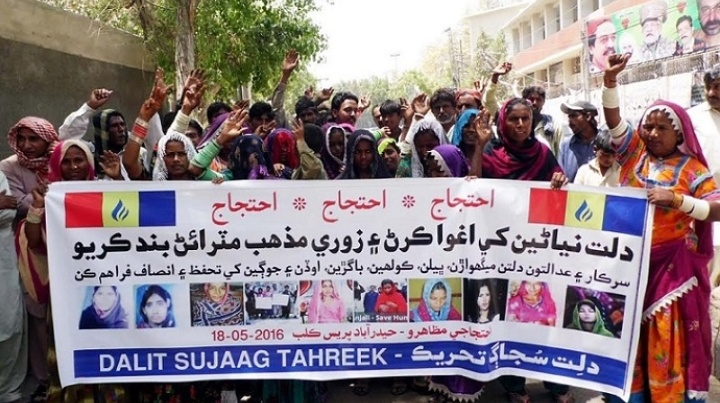
Dalit Sujag Tehreek protesting against forced Conversion of Scheduled Caste Hindu girls

- The DST has formed protests against forced Conversion of scheduled caste Hindu girls to Islam.
- The DST has made campaigns to make the Scheduled Caste Hindu community to put their religion as Scheduled Caste Hindus rather than just Hindus in the Census.
- DST members has contesting elections under the DST banner.

== Politics ==
During the formation of the DST, Chander Kolhi, the leader of Progressive Human Front said that the DST will take shape of a Dalit political party in Pakistan. In the 2018 Pakistan General Election, five members of DST including 3 women contested in the General election under the DST banner.

== See also ==
- Hinduism in Pakistan
