= Ramesh Kumar Vankwani =

Pakistani politician

- رميش ڪمار وانڪواڻي

Member of the National Assembly of Pakistan
- Incumbent
- Assumed office 13 March 2024
- Constituency: Reserved seat for minorities
- In office 13 August 2018 – 10 August 2023
- Constituency: Reserved seat for minorities
- In office 1 June 2013 – 31 May 2018
- Constituency: Reserved seat for minorities

Founder of PHC
- In office 2005–2025

Member of the Provincial Assembly of Sindh PML(Q)
- In office 2002–2007
- Constituency: Reserved seat for minorities

Personal details
- Born: 1974 (age 51–52) Islamkot, Sindh, Pakistan
- Party: MQM-P (2025-present)
- Other political affiliations: PPP (2024-2024); IPP (2023-2024); PTI (2018-2023); PMLN (2013-2018); PML(Q) (2002-2013)
- Occupation: Politician

Ramesh Kumar Vankwani (Sindhi: رميش ڪمار وانڪواڻي) is a Pakistani politician who had been a member of the National Assembly of Pakistan, from August 2018 till August 2023. But in 2022 he left PTI to join PPP. Previously he was member of the National Assembly from June 2013 to May 2018 and a member of the Provincial Assembly of Sindh from 2002 to 2007. He was considered a strongest candidate to contest general elections 2024 from NA-241 Karachi on the ticket of PPP. However, he was not awarded the ticket and his nomination on the reserved seats in the National Assembly was not liked by the ideological workers of PPP on the bases that he had been known changing political parties in the past two decades.

== Education and background ==
Vankwani was born in Islamkot, Tharparkar in 1974, to a Sindhi Hindu family. His father's name was Seetal Das Bankwani. Vankwani has a bachelor's degree of medicine and surgery.

== Political career ==
Vankwani ran for the seat of the Provincial Assembly of Sindh as an independent candidate from Constituency PS-61 (Tharparkar-II) in the 2002 Pakistani general election, but was unsuccessful. He received 34 votes and lost the seat to a candidate of National Alliance. In the same election, he was elected to the Provincial Assembly of Sindh as a candidate of Pakistan Muslim League (Q) on a reserved seat for minorities. He founded Pakistan Hindu Council in 2005.

Vankwani was elected to the National Assembly of Pakistan as a candidate of Pakistan Muslim League (N) (PML-N) on a reserved seat for minorities in the 2013 Pakistani general election.

Vankwani came to the limelight in September 2014, when he, along with Rehman Malik, was removed from a flight from Karachi to Islamabad because of their late check-in, which caused the flight to be delayed.

In January 2018, he was elected as the chairman of the National Assembly's Standing Committee for Statistics. In April 2018, he quit PML-N and joined Pakistan Tehreek-e-Insaf (PTI).

He was re-elected to the National Assembly as a candidate of PTI on a reserved seat for minorities in the 2018 Pakistani general election. In 2022, he defied PTI party policy by supporting the no-confidence motion against Prime Minister Imran Khan.

On 13 May 2024, the Election Commission of Pakistan (ECP) suspended his membership as a member of the National Assembly. This action followed a Supreme Court of Pakistan decision to suspend the verdict of the Peshawar High Court, which had denied the allocation of a reserved seat to the PTI-Sunni Ittehad Council bloc.

== See also ==
- Mahesh Kumar Malani
