= Kalat Kali Temple =

Hindu temple in Balochistan, Pakistan

Coordinates: 29°01′48″N 66°35′20″E

Kalat Kali Mandir
- کلات کالی مندر कलात काली मंदिर
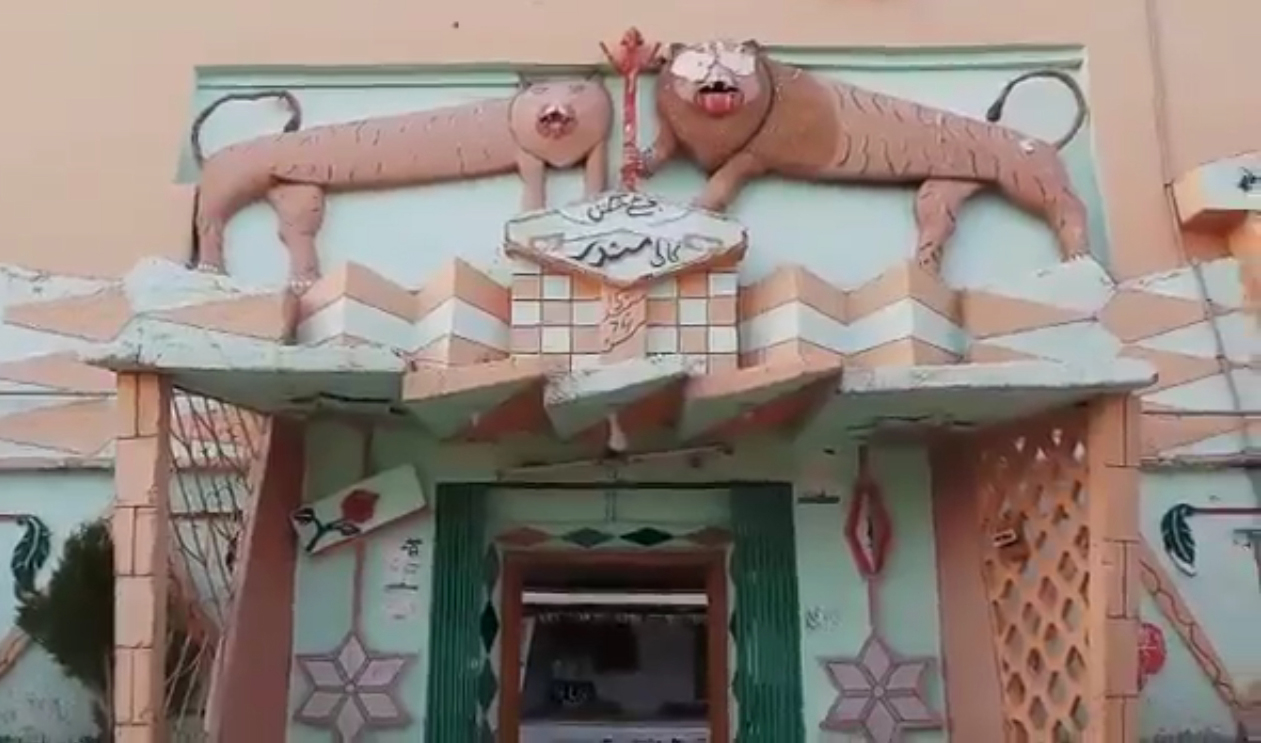
- Entrance to the shrine

- Location within Balochistan, Pakistan Location within Pakistan

Religion
- Affiliation: Hinduism
- District: Kalat District
- Deity: Kali
- Governing body: Pakistan Hindu Panchayat

Location
- Location: Kalat, Balochistan
- State: Balochistan, Pakistan
- Country: Pakistan

Architecture
- Type: Hindu temple
- Temple: 1

Kalat Kali Mandir is situated in the Shahi Bazaar in the Kalat in the Balochistan province of Pakistan and is dedicated to Goddess Kali. It is one of the oldest Hindu temples in Pakistan, and hosts the second biggest Kali statue in Asia. The temple is visited by Hindus from all over Pakistan and also from India.

== History ==
The temple was built by the Sewa dynasty, which is before the arrival of Islam in South Asia.

"At that time, the temple was known as Kalat-i-Seba (after a legendary Hindu king) and Kalat-i Nichari (after the Brahui-speaking Baloch Nichari tribe). The Nicharis are generally recognized as the oldest branch of the indigenous Brahuis."

The Kalat region along with the neighbouring Mastung and Bagh was noted as region with Shakta followers with the Kali temple being the oldest in the region. During the 1909–10, the temple was looted including the idol of the goddess. Later the idol was found broken. It was mended and was consecrated again.

== Significance ==
It is believed by the local Hindu community that goddess Kali spend most of her life in the Kalat region.

The idol of the goddess is made of marble. The idol kept inside a glass case. The goddess is shown as standing on the chest of Shiva and wearing a garland made of human skulls.

== Festival ==
The annual three day festival is celebrated during the January month. Devotees from different parts of Pakistan comes here for the festival. Special prayers will be held during the time and food will be distributed to the devotees.

== Issues ==
In 2010, Lakki Chand Garji, the chief priest of the temple and one of the main Hindu spiritual leaders in Pakistan was abducted. The temple faced issue with the accommodation of devotees during festivals. This was pointed out before the Supreme Court Commission during their visit to temple in January 2021. In April 2021, Balochistan government announced plan for the renovation of the temple.

== See also ==
- Hinglaj Mata Temple
- Bhadrakali temple, Lahore
