= List of Hindu temples in Pakistan =

Historic Hindu temple in Pakistan

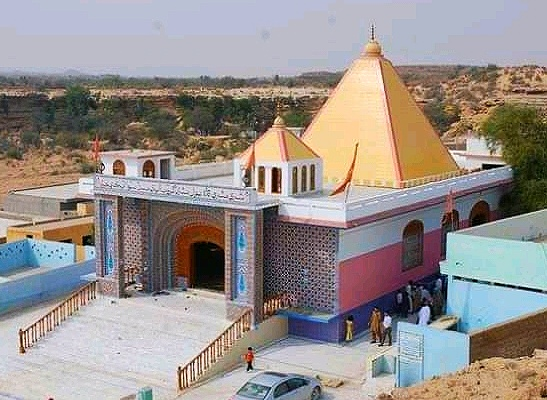
Guru Balpuri Ashram in Thana Bulla Khan

The major Hindu temples in Pakistan are Shri Hinglaj Mata temple (whose annual Hinglaj Yatra is the largest Hindu pilgrimage in Pakistan, which is participated by more than 250,000 pilgrims), Shri Ramdev Pir temple (whose annual Ramdevpir Mela in the temple is the second largest Hindu pilgrimage in Pakistan, Umarkot Shiv Mandir (which is famous for its annual Shivrathri festival, which is one of the biggest religious festivals in Pakistan, and the Churrio Jabal Durga Mata Temple (famous for Shivrathri celebrations which is attended by 200,000 pilgrims).

== Pakistan Administration Kashmir ==
=== Bhimber District ===
- Shiv Temple at Barnala

=== Kotli District ===
- Banganga Temple at Khuiratta
- Hindu Temples at Kotli City

=== Mirpur District ===
- Baba Balaji Temple at Ratta, Dadyal
- Raghunath Temple at Mangla Dam Lake
- Shivala Temple, at Mangla Dam Lake

=== Muzaffarabad District ===
- Sita Ram Temple at Muzaffarabad City

=== Neelum District ===
- Sharada Peeth at Sharda

=== Poonch District ===
- Mandhol Sun Temple at Mandhole

== Balochistan ==
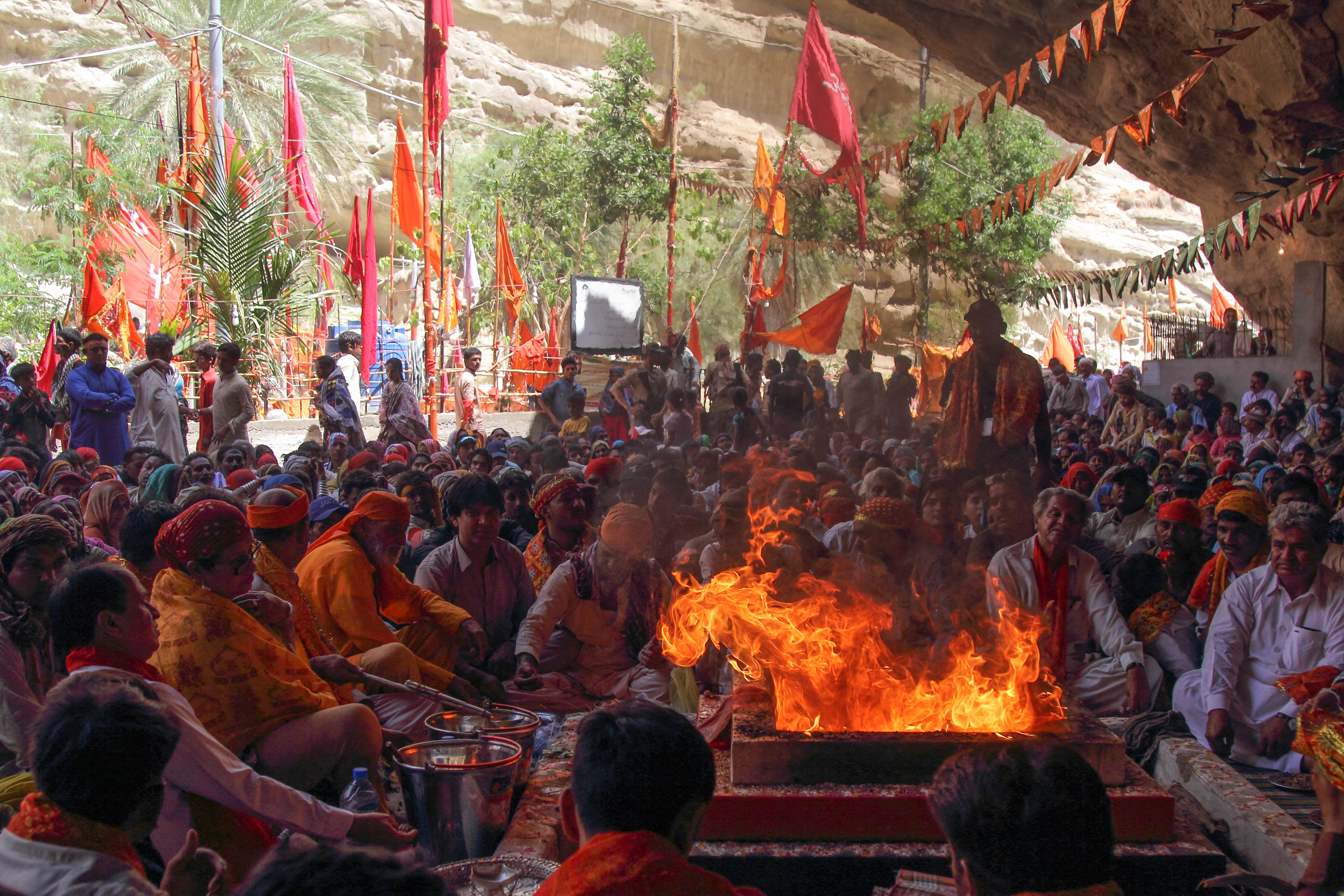
Hawan at Hinglaj Mata temple

=== Lasbela District ===
- Shri Hinglaj Mata temple is located in Hingol National Park. The shrine of the Goddess Hinglaj is located in the desert of Balochistan, Pakistan, about 215 kilometers west of the city of Karachi. The annual Hinglaj Yatra is the largest Hindu pilgrimage in Pakistan, which is participated by more than 250,000 pilgrims.
- Baba Chandragup is a mud volcano. It is an important stop for pilgrims on their way to the shrine of Shri Hinglaj Mata temple. The volcano is considered as the embodiment of Lord Shiva.

=== Dera Bugti District ===
- Marrhi Mandir at Dera Bugti

=== Kachhi District ===
- Baba Madho Das Temple at Bhag Tehsil.

=== Kalat District ===
- Kalat Kali Mata Temple at Kalat

=== Gwadar district ===
- Shri Krishna Mandir, Gwadar

=== Quetta District ===
- Arya Samaj Temple at Quetta
- Krishna Temple on Shawaksha Road
- Sidh Pani Nath Ji Temple at Mir Fort
- Musafir Khana Temple on Dr Bano Road
- Musafir Khana Matha Temple on Jinnah Road

=== Sibi District ===
- Sibi Mandir
- Tili Van Mandir
- Pooja Mata Mandir at Lehri

=== Zhob District ===
- Hindu temple, Babu Mohalla. It was not functional after 1947. In 2020, it was returned to the Hindu community.
- Arya Samaj Temple, Zhob

== Islamabad ==
- Rama Temple at Saidpur village
- Krishna Temple at Islamabad

== Khyber Pakhtunkhwa ==
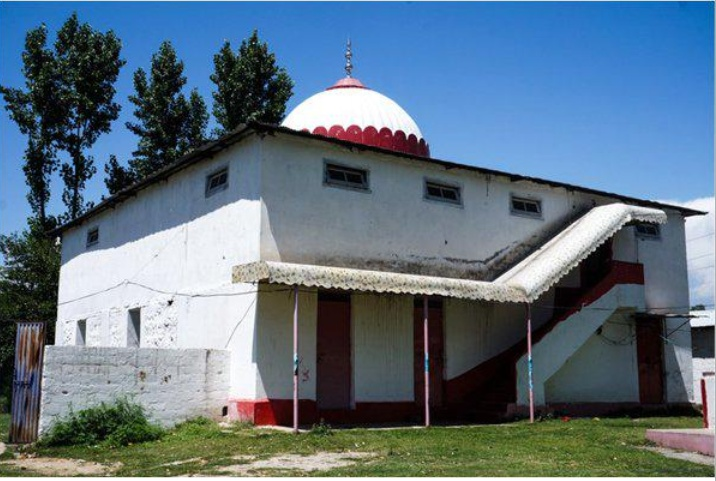
Mansehra Shiva Temple

=== Abbottabad District ===
- Krishna Temple

=== Dera Ismail Khan District ===
- Temple of Garur Bhagwan at Kali Bari area- It is now converted to hotel.
- Balmik Mandir at Jogianwala Mohallah
- Kafir Kot Hindu temple complex - 7th Century Hindu temple Complex.

=== Haripur District ===
- Krishna Temple at Main Bazar
- Maa Shairan Wali Temple at Main Bazar
- Hindu temple at Khanpur area. It was discovered in 2019. The temple is believed to be around 1000 years old.

=== Karak District ===
- Shri Paramhans Dayal Ji Maharaj at Teri. It was affected during the 2020 Karak temple attack (Note: Demolished in December 2020 again)
- Hindu temple in Bannu in Teri area, now converted to a bakery.

=== Kohat District ===
- Hindu temple in Kohat city- converted to school

=== Mansehra District ===
- Bareri Mata/Durga Temple and Shrine on Bareri Hill, (no longer in regular use but sometimes visited by pilgrims and tourists. The edicts of Ashoka are inscribed on three large boulders nearby.)
- Mansehra Shiva Temple at Chitti Gatti

=== Mardan District ===
- Guides Infantry Temple at Hoti

=== Nowshera District ===
- Balmeek temple, Nowshera Cantonment

=== Peshawar District ===
- Asamai Temples Complex at Asamai Gate - now leased to a families migrating from Kashmir.
- Balmiki Mandir at Kalibari
- Dargah Pir Ratan Nath at Jhanda Bazaar
- Gorakh Nath Temple at Gor Khatri
- Kalibari Mandir at Kalibari
- Nandi Mandir- closed for years
- Panj Tirath at Hashtnagri
- Wangri Garan Temple at Hashtnagri It was under the Khyber-Pakhtunkhwa Department for Archaeology and Museums, which give the temple on lease. In 2016, the temple was demolished and a three-storey commercial plaza was built despite opposition from Hindu community.

=== Swat District ===
- Vishnu temple

== Punjab ==
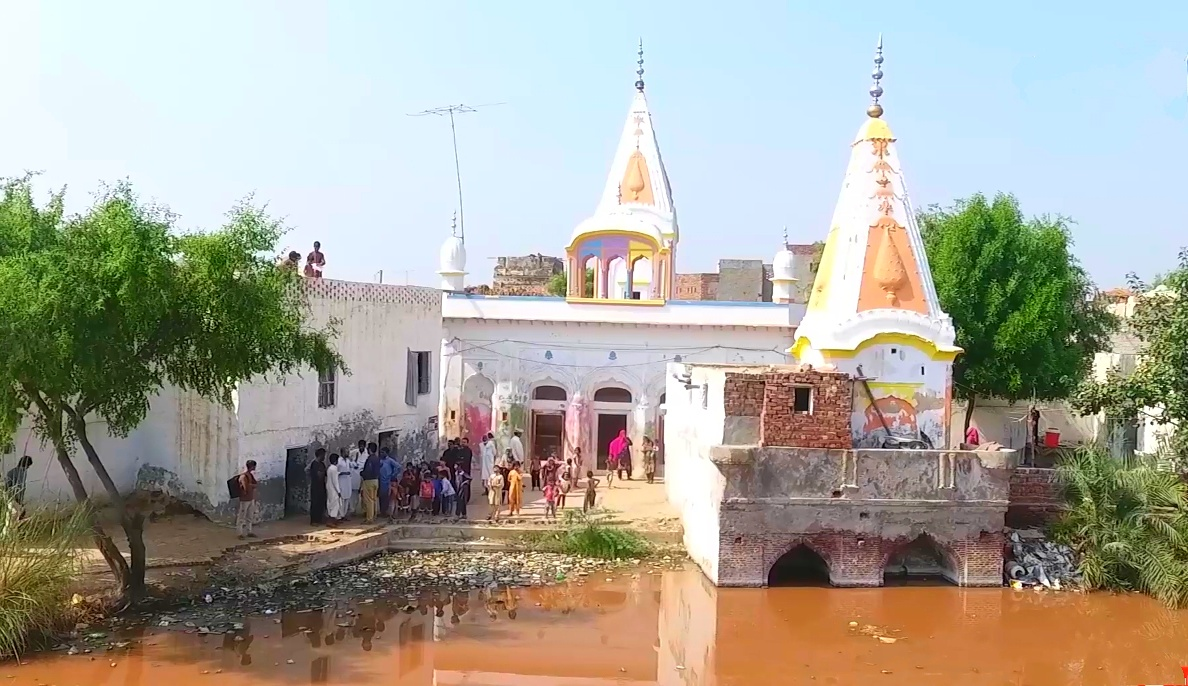
Baba Ram Thaman Shrine in Kasur district

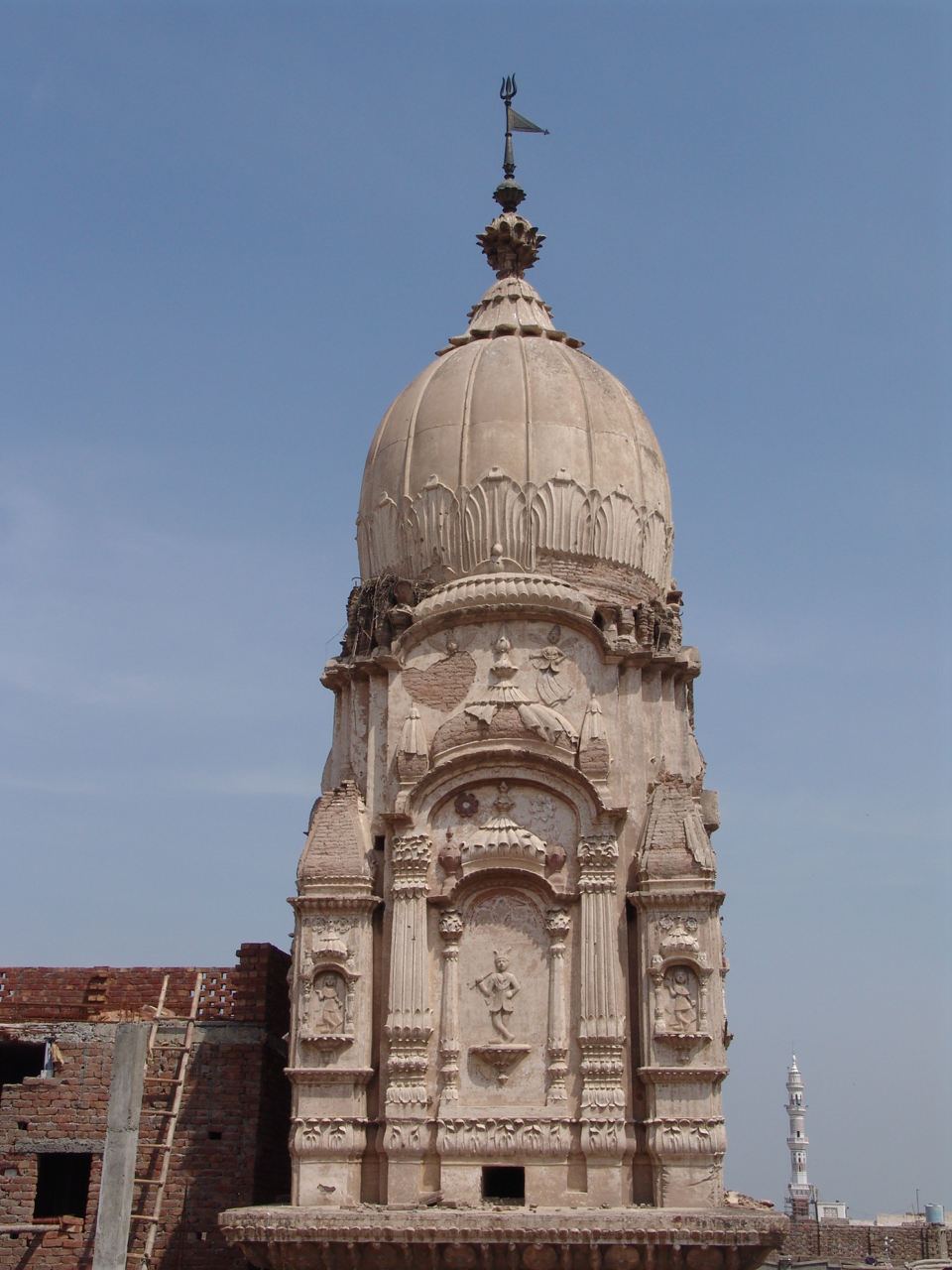
Bavalakh Nath Temple in Jhang

=== Attock District ===
- Hari Temple at Hazro (non-functional)
- Ghairmumkin Shawala Temple at Hassanabdal (non-functional)
- Mandir/Dharamshala Premdas at Hassanabdal (non-functional)
- Shawala Mandir at Fateh Jang (non-functional)
- Mandir Pandat Lal at Pindigheb (non-functional)

=== Bahawalpur District ===
- Kala Dhari Mandir

=== Rahim Yar Khan District ===
- Krishna Temple, Sadiqabad
- Sidhi Vinayak Temple, Bhong

=== Bhakkar District ===
- Old Sheraan Wala Temple at Main Bazar. (non-functional)

=== Chakwal District ===
- Katasraj Temple at Choa Saidanshah
- Malot Temple at Malot

=== Chiniot District ===
- Bawa Lal Mandir (non-functional)
- Kartari Lal Mandir (non-functional)

=== Faisalabad District ===
- Arya Samaj Mandir (non-functional)
- Thakar Dewara Mandir (non-functional)
- Mandir Jawala Nagar at Jawalanagar (non-functional)
- Sri Ragunath temple (non-functional)
- Sita-Ram Temple at Jhang Bazar Chowk (non-functional)

=== Gujranwala District ===
- Jalianwala Mandir at Wazirabad (non-functional)
- Hindu temple at Bhabarian Wala (non-functional)

=== Gujrat District ===
- Shwala Mandir (non-functional)

=== Hafizabad District ===
- Raghunath temple (non-functional)

=== Jhang District ===
- Bawalal nath mandir (non-functional)

=== Jhelum District ===
- Shankar Dass Mandir (non-functional)

=== Kasur District ===
- Baba Ram Thaman Shrine

=== Khanewal District ===
- Sanatan Dharam Mandir at Mian Channun (non-functional)

=== Khushab District ===
- Amb Shareef Temple in Sakesar

=== Lahore District ===
- Basuli Hanuman Temple at Anarkali Bazaar
- Bhadrakali Temple, Lahore at Gulzar Colony
- Krishna Temple at Ravi Road, Qasurpura
- Lava Temple at Lahore Fort
- Valmiki Temple at Anarkali Bazaar

=== Layyah District ===
- Mata Rani Mandir at Layyah (non-functional)

=== Lodhran District ===
- Bara Mandir at Kehror Pcca (non-functional)

=== Mandi Bahauddin District ===
- Krishna Mandir (non-functional)

=== Mianwali District ===
- Mari Indus Temples near Kalabagh at Mari Indus

=== Multan District ===
- Aditya Sun Temple at Suraj Kund
- Sri Narasimha Temple at Prahladpuri

=== Nankana Sahib District ===
- Sri Krishna Temple at Nankana Sahib (non-functional)

=== Narowal District ===
- Ramlalla Mandir at Mouza Sukho Chak (non-functional)
- Hindu temple at Baoli Sahib. It was non-functional. In 2024, ETPB announced its renovation.

=== Okara District ===
- Hari Bol Mandir at Okara (non-functional)

=== Pakpattan District ===
- Sanatan Dharam Mandir at Pakpattan Sharif (non-functional)

=== Rajanpur district ===
- Hindu Temple at Sadar Bazar (non-functional)

=== Rawalpindi District ===
- Shri Krishna Temple at Saddar in Rawalpindi city
- Valmiki Swamiji Mandir, Gracy Lines
- Ambardaran Temple at Bohar Bazar
- Bagh Sardaran Temple Complex at Ghazni Colony
- Ganesha Temple, Landa Bazar
- Ganj Mandi Hindu Temple at Raja Bazar
- Jandial Temple at Taxila (Zoroastrianism)
- Kalyan Das Temple at Kohati Bazar
- Krishna Temple at Purana Qila
- Lal Kurti Temple at Lalkurti
- Sagri Temple at Saagri

=== Sahiwal District ===
- Akali Chand Mandir (non-functional)

=== Sargodha District ===
- Baoliwala Temple at Bhera
- Shiv Temple at Bhera
- Kirana Hills- The hill is sacred to the Hindu community. It was an active pilgrimage site before partition, with annual festival being celebrated.

=== Sialkot District ===
- Jagannath Temple at Hassanpura, Sialkot (non-functional)
- Puran Bhagat Temple at Rasulpur Road
- Shivala Teja Singh temple at Kashmiri Mohalla. It was not functional after 1947. In 2019, the Pakistan government renovated and handed over the temple to the Hindu community.

=== Toba Tek Singh District ===
- Hindu temple at Gojra. It was non-functional after partition and was occupied by families. In 2021, the temple was collapsed due to rain.

== Sindh ==
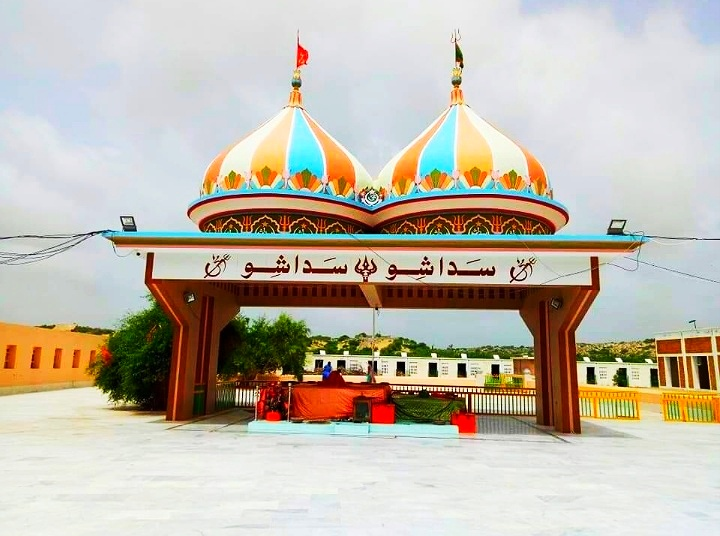
Parbrahm Ashram

Temples in Sindh province:

=== Badin District ===
- Samnath Mandir (non-functional)

=== Dadu District ===
- Gorakh Hill of Gorakhnath
- Shiva Mandir Johi at Johi (non-functional)
- Sant Baba Bhagat Ram Darbar Mandir
- Bhai Sant Thawan Das Mandir
- Bhai Gurdas Ram Mandir (non-functional)
- Veernath Temple at Khairpur Nathan Shah

=== Ghotki District ===
- Sacho Satram Dham (SSD), is one of biggest Hindu shrines in Sindh. Its spread over 300 acres.
- Devri Sahib temples at Raharki village is situated In the opposite river site of SSD. It is connected to the Sacho Satram Dham by SSD Century Celebration bridge.
- Shadani Darbar at Mirpur Mathelo

=== Hyderabad District ===
- Goswamiparshotam Gir Chela Goswami Nihal Gir
- Guru Gurpat Mandir at Hyderabad
- Durga Shiv Mandir at Circuit House

=== Jacobabad District ===
- Baba Kalyan Dass Mandir
- Derbaar Manjhand at Manjhand

=== Jamshoro District ===
- Daharan Tirth at Lakki hills
- Gobindram Darbar at Manjhand
- Guru Mangal Gir Temple in Thana Bulla Khan
- Guru Balpuri Ashram in Thana Bulla Khan

=== Karachi District ===
- Darya Lal Sankat Mochan Mandir (also called Jhoolay Lal Mandir) at Custom House
- Pamwal Das Shiv Mandir at Lyari Town.
- Panchmukhi Hanuman Temple at Soldier Bazar, is 1500 years old and houses a 2.5m tall statue of lord Hanuman. Renovation of the temple commenced in 2012 and it is popular among Maharashtrian, Sindhi and Balochi devotees. Half of the temple's 2,609 square feet of land has been encroached upon by Muslims, The temple has won back four of six small plots after the lease was cancelled by a district court and is still fighting to reclaim two remaining plots.

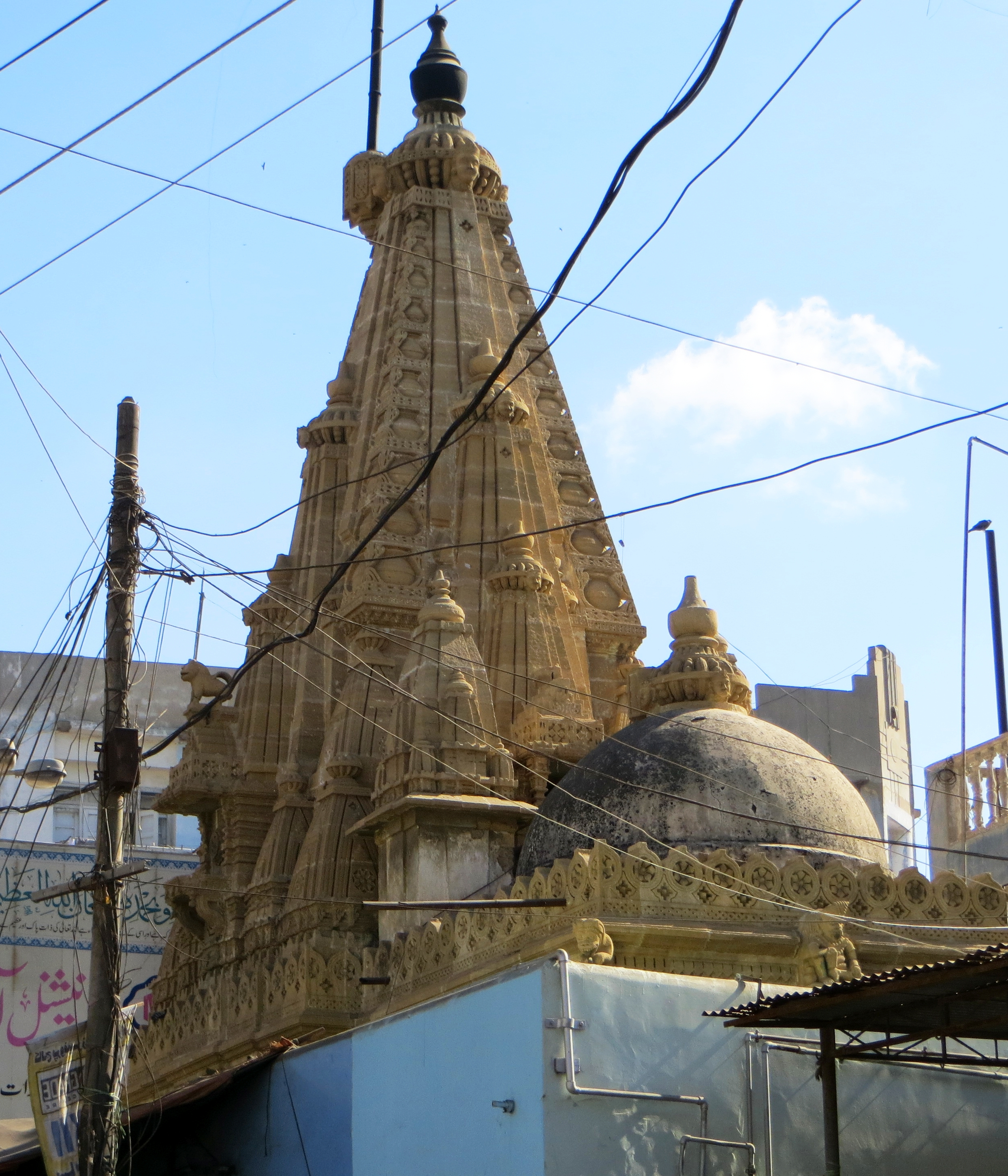
Panchmukhi Hanuman Temple in Karachi's Soldier Bazaar

- Shri Laxmi Narayan Mandir at Native Jetty area
- Shri Mari Amman Temple at Madrasi Para. Worshipped by the Tamil Hindu community in Pakistan.
- Bhagnari Mandir
- Shri Punch Mukhi Hanuman Mandir at Garden East
- Shree Ratneshwar Mahadev Mandir at Clifton
- Shri Swaminarayan Mandir
- Shri Varun Dev Mandir at Manora beach

=== Khairpur District ===
- Bhai Sant Das Mandir Khairpur (non-functional)

=== Larkana District ===
- Shiva Mandir (non-functional)
- Sawami Dharm Das Mandir (non-functional)

=== Matiari District ===
- Jhulelal Mandir at Oderolal Village

=== Mirpur Khas District ===
- Ganga Bai Trust Mandir (non-functional)
- Mochi Ram Mandir (non-functional)

=== Shikarpur District ===
- Jamun Ki Dharam Shala at Somro Muhalla (non-functional)
- Samadha Ashram at Shikarpur (non-functional)
- Budheshwar Mahadev temple at Shikarpur
- Swami Shankaranand Bharti at Shikarpur
- Jog Mata Temple, an 18th-Century temple

=== Sukkur District ===
- Kalka Cave Temple in Rohri

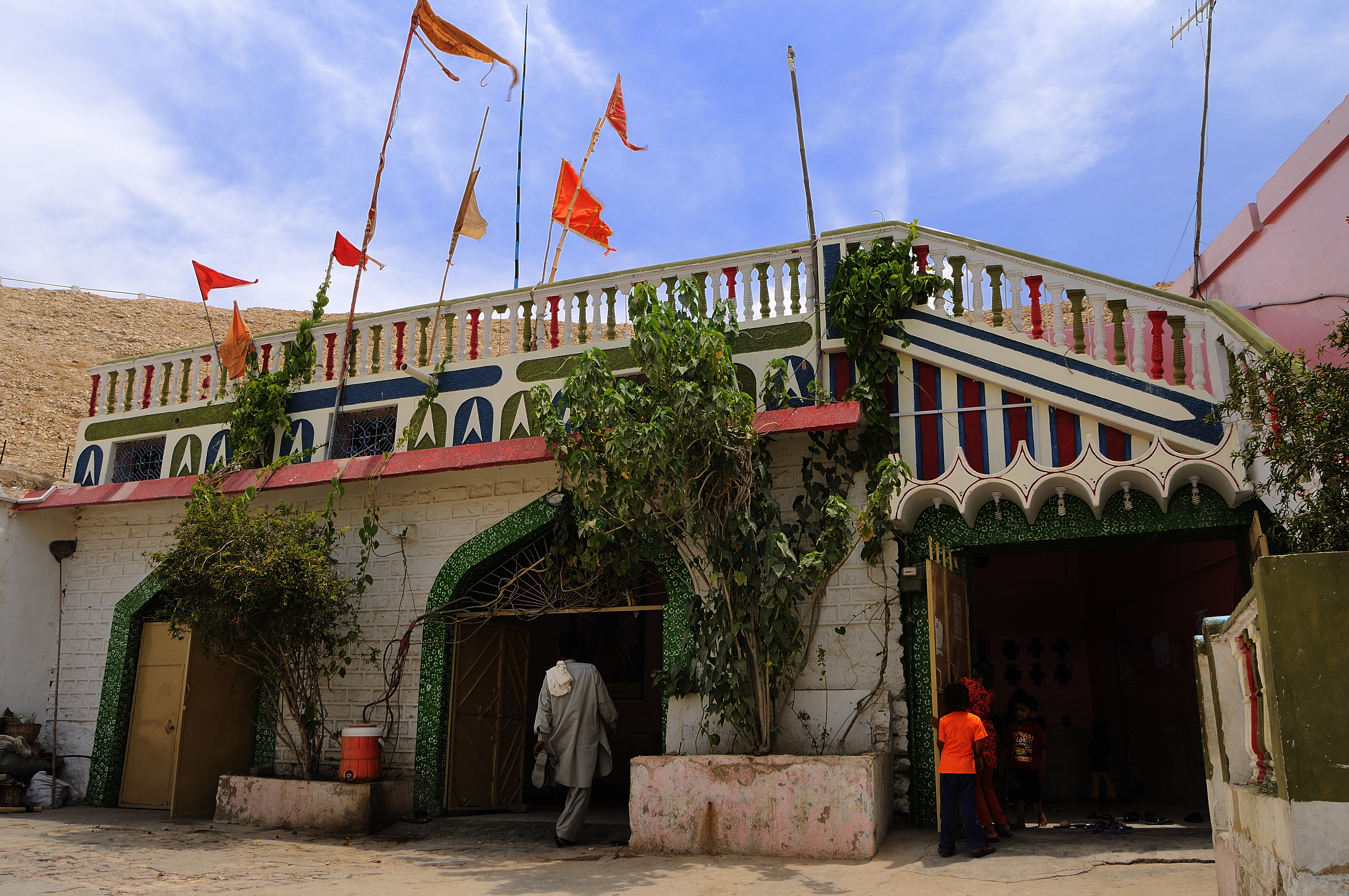
Kalka Cave Temple in Rohri

- Sadh Belo Island Temple
- Ramapir temple at Sukkur

=== Tando Allahyar District ===
- Ramapir Temple Tando Allahyar

=== Tharparkar District ===
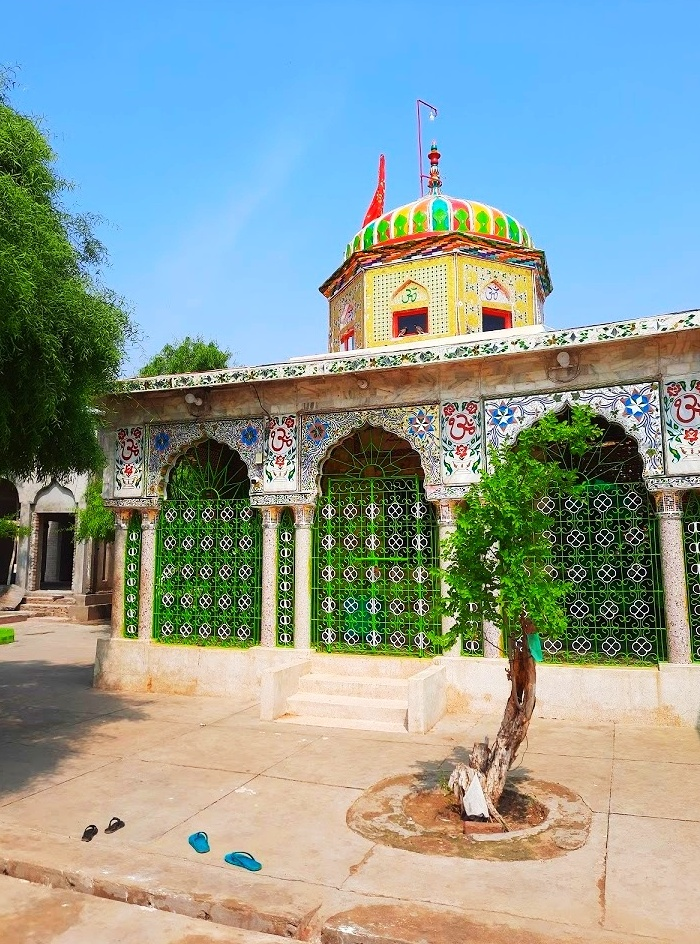
Sant Nenuram Ashram

- Sant Nenuram Ashram in Islamkot
- Parbrahm Ashram at Diplo
- Sardharo Shiv temple at Nagarparkar
- Churrio Jabal Durga Temple at Nangarparkar
- Krishna Mandir at Mithi
- Krishna Mandir at Kantio
- Nagarparkar Temples at Nagarparkar

=== Thatta District ===
- Baba Srichand Darbar
- Lal Sahib Mandir (non-functional)
- Shree Mamai Dev Ashthan at Makli

=== Umerkot District ===
- Aasmaniyan Ro Thaan at Umarkot
- Dargah Pir Pithoro at Pithoro
- Umarkot Shiv Mandir, at old Amarkot

== Threats ==
A survey carried out by All Pakistan Hindu Rights Movement Pakistan's revealed that out of 428 Hindu temples in Pakistan that existed before Partition, only around 20 survive today and they remain neglected by the Evacuee Trust Property Board which controls those, while the rest had been converted for other uses. Nearly 1000 active and former Hindu temples were attacked in 1992 riots and in other attacks like the 2014 Larkana temple attack, 2019 Ghotki riots, 2021 Bhong temple attack and the 2020 Karak temple attack. Idols in some temples in Pakistan have gone missing and the ponds outside those temples that are considered necessary for a holy dip are drying up due to neglect, which has irked the Supreme Court of Pakistan. However, some of the closed temples have been reopened following the Court rulings, and government intervention.

== Gallery ==
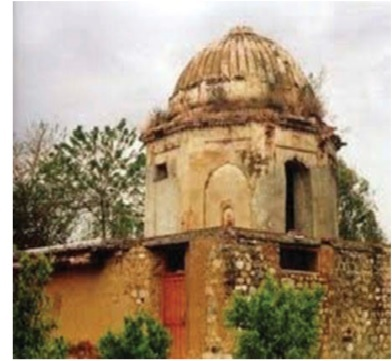
Mansehra Shiva Temple before renovation.

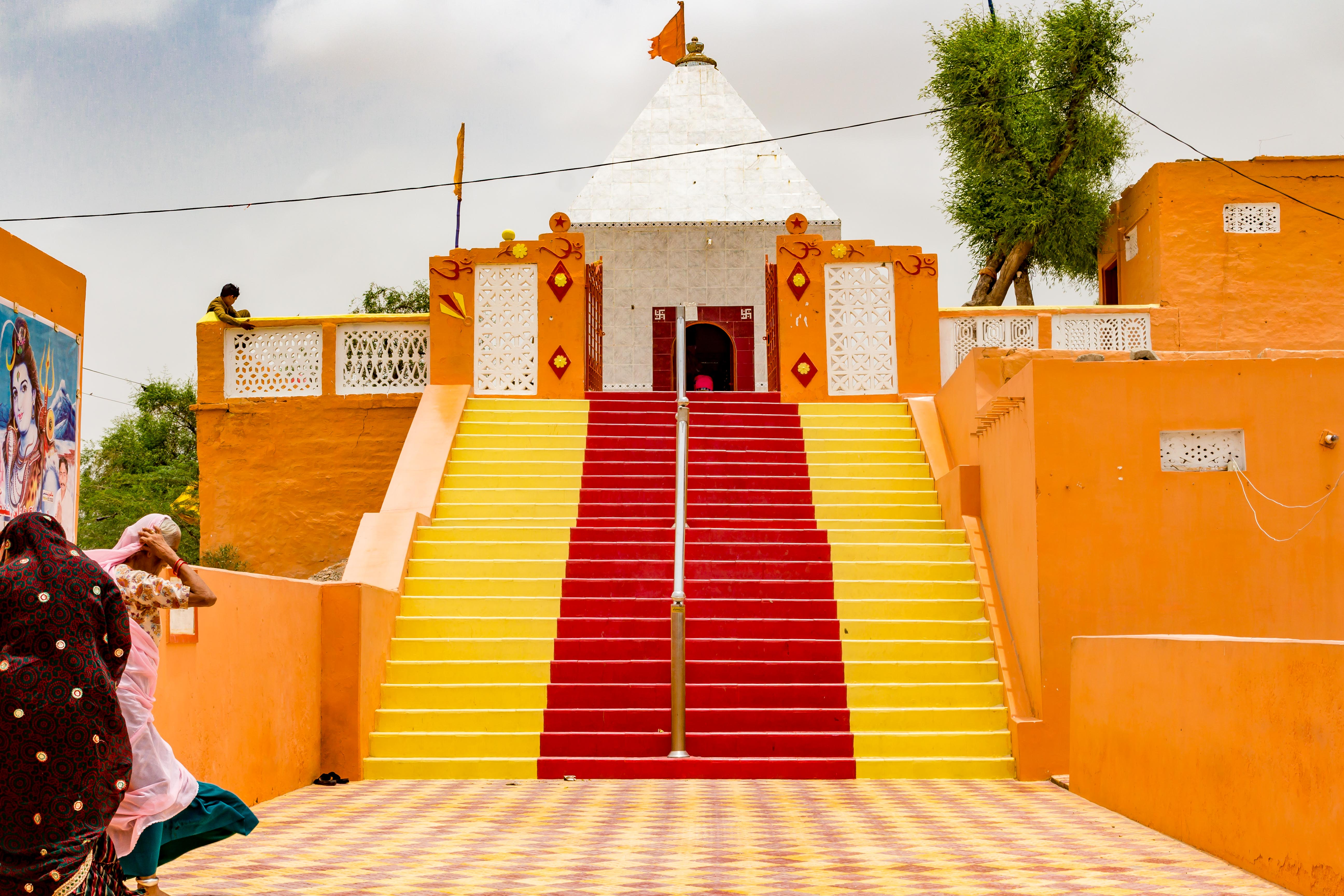
View of Umarkot Shiv Mandir.

View of Shive and Pithoro Temple, Pabuhar.

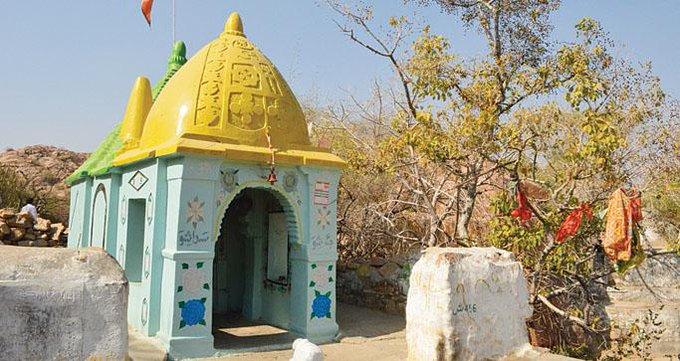
View of Shiv Temple at Sardharo.

Shiv Temple, Chelhar.

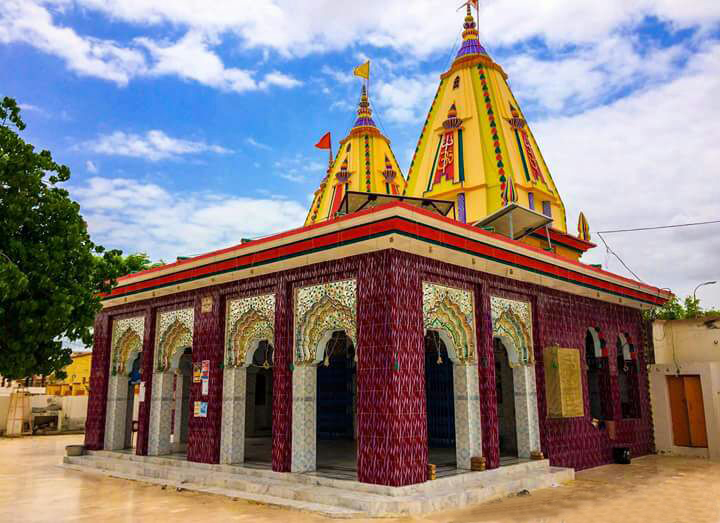
Shiv Parvati Temple, Mithi.

Anchlasar Temple, Nagarparkar.

== See also ==
- Hinduism in Pakistan
- Lists of Hindu temples
- Hindu marriage laws in Pakistan
- Minorities in Pakistan
- Pakistan Hindu Council
- Persecution of Hindus in Pakistan
- Religious discrimination in Pakistan
