= Krishna Temple, Islamabad =

Religious building in Islamabad, Pakistan

- Location within Pakistan Location within Asia

Religion
- Affiliation: Hinduism
- District: Islamabad
- Deity: Krishna

Location
- Location: H-9 Area
- State: Islamabad Capital Territory
- Country: Pakistan
- Coordinates: 33°39′51.2″N 73°02′50.3″E

Architecture
- Type: Hindu temple

Shri Krishna Mandir, still under construction, is the first Hindu temple to be granted permission to be built in Islamabad, capital of Pakistan, on 0.5 acre land in the H-9 area of Islamabad Capital Territory. It will be a place of worship for the 3,000 Hindu families living in Islamabad. The temple will be managed by the Pakistan Hindu Panchayat. The construction of the temple is controversial, since the approval the construction was challenged by many Islamic extremists and the construction site has been attacked and vandalised four times. Following which the CDA cancelled the land allocation. As of 2025, the temple construction has not been started.

== Background ==
Before 1947, temple structures were present in Islamabad and surrounding regions, such as the temple-like structures in Saidpur village, but they have been abandoned and are not used. The Saidpur village was declared as a heritage site and since the temple is surrounded by shops and restaurants. The Hindus were not allowed to pray there. The temple-like structure in Saidpur village is not actually a temple but a dharamshala. According to the 1941 census, a majority of the population of the adjacent city of Rawalpindi was non-Muslim, and about 1/3rd of the total population there was Hindu. Therefore, likely many Hindu temples and other non-Muslim places of worship existed in the area, but were abandoned after the partition. Islamabad was built in the immediate vicinity of Rawalpindi during the 1960s.

There are 737 Hindus living in Islamabad. Most of them are migrants from Sindh and Balochistan, and are businessmen, doctors or public and private sector employees. The Hindu community has been demanding the allocation of land where they could build a temple. In 2016, the Capital Development Authority (CDA) allocated half an acre in sector H-9 for building a temple. However, the small Hindu community of Islamabad was unable to collect the money required to build the temple: the money they collected through donations was only enough to build the boundary wall. So in 2018 the Hindu Community pleaded for help from the Prime Minister Imran Khan. This demand was raised again in January 2020. In June 2020, the Pakistan Religious Affairs Minister said that the government will give money for the construction of the temple. The groundbreaking ceremony of the temple construction was performed on 24 June 2020. On 27 June 2020, the Prime Minister Imran Khan released ₹175,000,000 (equivalent to ₹220 million or US$2.3 million in 2026) for the construction of the temple.

== Controversy ==
In 2018, some miscreants encroached the temple plot and made tents inside it. They were allegedly backed by the people from Seminary. They were cleared from the plot by the Islamabad capital administration after several months

Following the decision to construct a Hindu temple in Islamabad in 2020, some extremists spoke against it. A petition was filed in the Lahore High Court against the construction of the temple. According to the petitioner, "Pakistan was created in the name of Islam and Pakistan's Constitution does not allow any action against the principal of Islam". Three other petitions were filed in the Islamabad High Court against the temple construction. The Islamabad High Court rejected the petition to stay the temple construction and the Court said that the rights of minorities are protected in the Constitution and it must be protected. Fatwa was issued by the Jamia Ashrafia against the construction of a new Hindu temple in Pakistan. The Pakistan Muslim League (Q) (PML-Q) opposed the construction of a Hindu temple. The PML-Q leader Chaudhry Pervaiz Elahi argued that Pakistan was created in the name of Islam and to build a Hindu temple is against Islam. The religious parties like Jamiat Ulema-e-Islam (F), Jamiat Ahle Hadith and Jamaat-e-Islami were against the construction of a Hindu temple as according to them it is against Pakistan's ideology. The Jamaat-e-Islami held a protest rally outside the Rawalpindi Press Club against the temple construction. The Jamiat Ulema-e-Islam (F) is planning to file a petition in the Federal Shariat Court. The Ittehad-e-Tanzeem Madaris (an umbrella body of the madrassa boards) also opposed the temple construction. Certain media criticized the fundamentalists and stated that Islamabad has five wine shops and the fundamentalist were not opposing that but selectively criticising the temple construction. However, Muslim groups like Pakistan Ulema Council, Shia Ulema Board and the Catholic Human rights organisation NCJP, supported the temple construction.

Following the controversy, the Capital Development Authority (CDA) stopped the construction of the boundary wall around the temple plot and the Ministry of Religious Affairs decided to take advice from the Council of Islamic Ideology on the decision to give money for the temple construction. However, the Pakistan Hindu Panchayat said that they had already submitted an application to the CDA for construction the wall but no response was provided. Meanwhile, the partially build boundary wall was demolished by a group of extremists. The videos of extremists demolishing the boundary wall went viral on social media and the Pakistanis heavily criticized the demolition. One video was of an extremist demolishing the temple wall and the other was of another fundamentalist who is standing on the demolished wall and saying Azaan. Following the incident the netizens in Pakistan started trending #MandirTauBanega on Twitter, which became one of the top trends on the social media. The Amnesty International also urged Pakistan to reverse the decision of stopping the temple construction. The extremists who demolished the wall were not arrested. A video circulating on social media also showed a bearded man recording a message with his toddlers threatening to "kill every single Hindu", igniting controversy.

On 8 June, the Islamabad High Court disposed all petitions against the construction of the temple and ordered that the construction can continue the after the building plan was approved by the CDA. An Intra Court Appeal (ICA) was filed challenging this decision of the Islamabad High Court and Court decided to take the Intra Court Appeal. Later the Court dismissed the Intra Court Appeal. On 8 June, first public protest supporting the construction of temple was held in Islamabad. On 10 July, another protest was held outside the UN Headquarters in Geneva. Protest also happened in Nepal outside the Pakistan Embassy. The United Kingdom government also expressed their displeasure over the opposition of the Temple construction. In June, the Ministry of Religious Affairs asked advise from the Council of Islamic Ideology on the temple construction and whether the government can grant money for the temple construction. On 28 October 2020, the Council of Islamic Ideology (CII) ruled that the construction of temple is not against the constitutional and the Sharia. The CII stated that the Hindu community in Islamabad have the right to have a place where they can perform last rites of the deceased according to religious instructions like all other religious groups in the country. However, the CII didn't supported the govt funding for construction of temple but it recommended two solutions for funding. One suggestion was that the government could create a block fund and hand the amount to the minority community. Another was to amend the Act of the Evacuee Trust Property Board to meet the finances expenses to execute religious activities. On 21 December 2020, the CDA gave permission for the construction of a boundary wall around the temple and cremation site. In November 2021, the CDA cancelled the land allocation.

In 2025, the Pakistan’s state minister for religious affairs Kheal Das Kohistani, pledged to raise the issue of the temple construction with the Ministry of Interior and the Capital Development Authority.

== Composition ==
In the proposed site, in addition to the main Temple, there will be a community hall, a crematorium, accommodation space for visitors and parking space.

== See also ==
- List of Hindu temples in Pakistan
- Hinduism in Pakistan
- Ramapir Temple Tando Allahyar
- Hinglaj Mata mandir
- Kalka Cave Temple
- Umarkot Shiv Mandir
- 2019 Ghotki riots
