= Inayatabad =

U.C Inayatabad
- Village and union council
- Country: Pakistan
- Region: Khyber-Pakhtunkhwa
- District: Mansehra District
- Elevation: 3,224 m (10,577 ft)
- Time zone: UTC+5 (PST)
- Postal code: 22010

Inayatabad (Urdu: عنایت آباد) is a village and union council (an administrative subdivision) of Mansehra District in Khyber-Pakhtunkhwa province of Pakistan. It is located in Mansehra Tehsil and lies to the north of the district capital Mansehra and lies in area affected by the 2005 Kashmir earthquake.

== Villages ==
Villages that lies within the Union Council of Inayatabad are:

- Bhanda Peeraan
- Chak
- Chitti Gatti
- Gandhian
- Inayatabad
- Nara
- Tootkay

== Education ==
The union council contains several private sector educational institutions alongside public facilities such as Inayatabad Public School. Residents of the area have entered professions across education, the armed forces, and the civil service

== Languages ==
90% population of this village speaks Hindko as their mother tongue, while remaining speaks Gojari, Pashto and other languages.

== Tribes ==
Main tribes of this area are Swati, Tanoli, Gujjars, Kashmiries, Awans and Parachas.

== See also ==
- Bhanda Peeraan
