= Panchamukha =

Iconography of five-faced deities in Hinduism

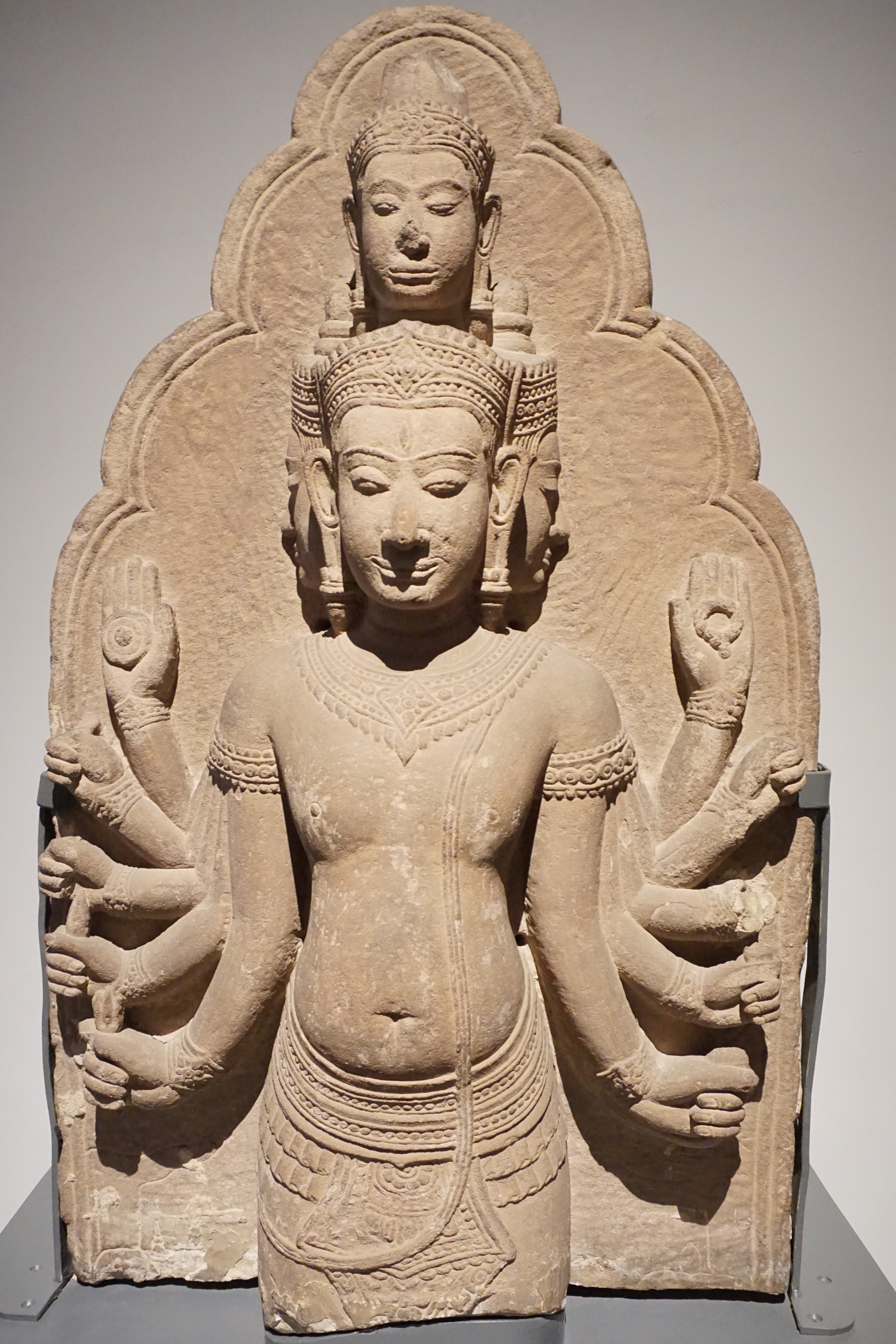
Panchamukha Shiva, 16th century, Ayutthaya. Photograph from the National Museum, Bangkok, Thailand.

Panchamukha (Sanskrit: पञ्चमुख, romanized: Pañcamukha, lit. 'five faces'), also rendered Panchamukhi, is a concept in Hindu iconography in which a deity is represented with five heads. Several Hindu deities are depicted with five faces in their iconography, such as Hanuman, Shiva, Brahma, Ganesha, and Gayatri.

== Iconography ==
=== Hanuman ===
The deity Hanuman is sometimes featured with five-faces in his iconography, known as Panchamukhi Hanuman, or Panchamukha Anjaneya. Each head is that of a deity associated with Vishnu, and is depicted to be facing a cardinal direction: Hanuman faces the east, Narasimha faces the south, Varaha faces the north, Garuda faces the west, and Hayagriva faces the sky. This iconography is not regarded to exist in mainstream Hinduism, and has been primarily featured in the Tantra tradition only since the 15th century CE. The description of the appearance of Panchamukha Hanuman is found in a Tantric treatise called the Hanumat Rahashyam. The section of the text called the Panchamukhahanumat Kavacham contains a description of this form.

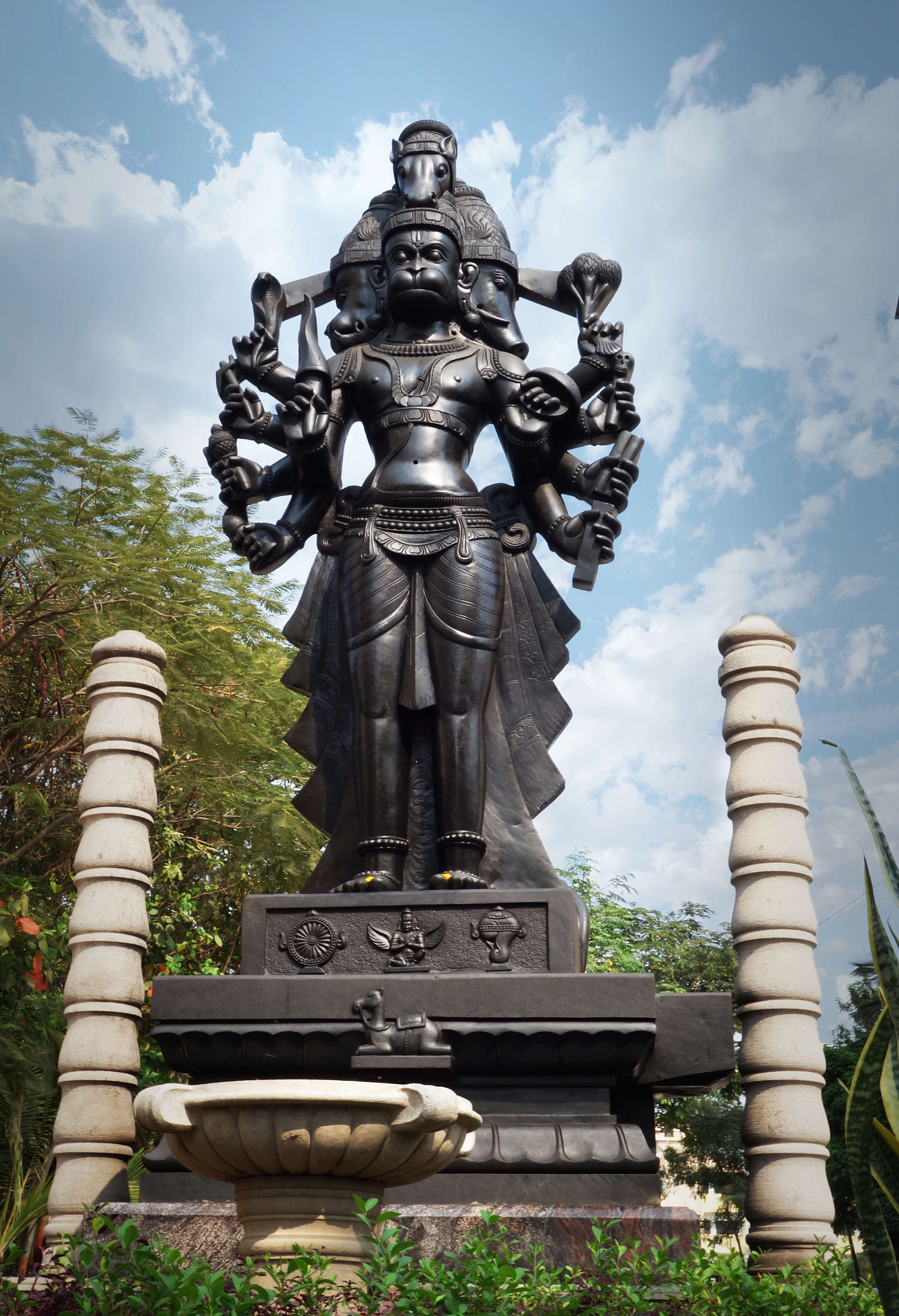
The Panchamukhi Hanuman Statue at Shirdi in Maharashtra, India.

This form of the deity also appears in regional traditions of the Ramayana. In one version, Rama and Lakshmana are captured by Ahiravana, and are offered to a goddess as sacrifices in Patala, the netherworld. Hanuman rescues the brothers from their captivity, slaying the goddess, and defeats Ahiravana by extinguishing five lamps simultaneously by manifesting his five faces.

=== Shiva ===
The deity Shiva is sometimes represented in his panchamukha aspect, each connoting one of his attributes:

1. His upward face is called iśānam, and represents knowledge and nature. It is supposed to be depicted in a copper hue.
2. His eastern face is called tatpuruṣam, and represents the organs of touch and action. It is supposed to be depicted in a yellow hue.
3. His western face is called vāmadevam, and represents the ego and fire. It is supposed to be depicted in a red hue.
4. His southern face is called aghoram, and represents intellect and righteousness. It is supposed to be depicted in a blue hue.
5. His northern face is called sadyojātam, and represents the mind and the substance called soma. It is supposed to be depicted in a white hue.

=== Brahma ===
The deity Brahma, while most commonly depicted with four heads, is often stated to have once possessed five heads in Hindu literature. According to one legend, after Brahma created a goddess, named either Saraswati, Savitri, or Gayatri, he grew infatuated by her, despite the protests of sages that she was his spiritual daughter. The goddess is said to have offered her respects to her creator by circumambulating him. Unable to control himself, in desperation to maintain his sight of her, Brahma manifested three heads to his sides and also one atop his head. This exhausted him of all of his merit. in another legend, Brahma asserted his superiority over Shiva, his fifth head making a number of incendiary remarks against him. Shiva responded by manifesting his own panchamukha aspect, and sliced off Brahma's fifth head with his fingernail, or commanded his aspect of Bhairava to perform the deed.

=== Ganesha ===
The deity Ganesha is sometimes represented with five faces in his iconography, called Heramba or Panchamukha Ganesha. Each head of the deity is said to represent the five koshas, the sheaths of annamaya, pranamaya, manomaya, vijñānamaya, and anandamaya.

=== Gayatri ===
The deity Gayatri, the personification of the Gayatri mantra, is depicted to possess five faces in her iconography. Four of her heads are stated to depict the four Vedas, while the fifth head stands for the Ultimate Reality.

== Temples ==
=== Panchmukhi Hanuman temple, Basatiyawala ===
The Panchmukhi Hanuman temple of Basatiyawala is situated in the Yamunanagar district of Haryana near Bilaspur.

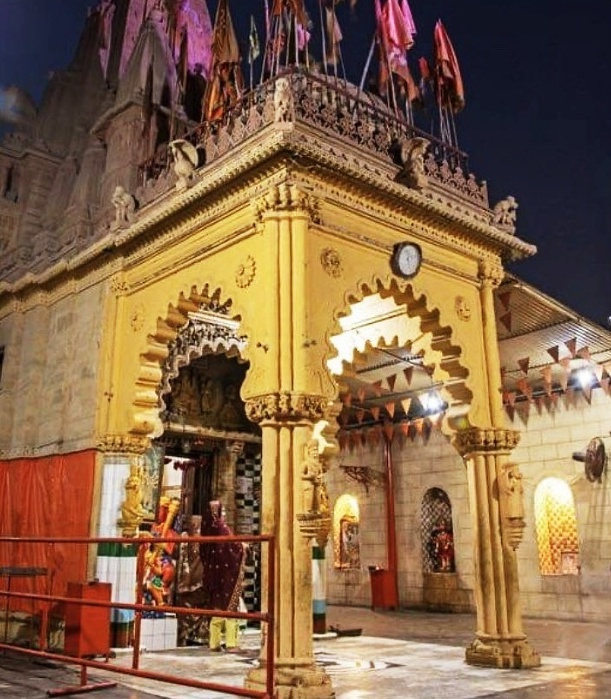
Shri Panchmukhi Hanuman Temple

=== Panchmukhi Hanuman Temple, Karachi ===
A Panchmukhi Hanuman temple is located in Karachi in the Sindh Province of Pakistan. It is claimed to be a 1,500 year old temple.

== Gallery ==
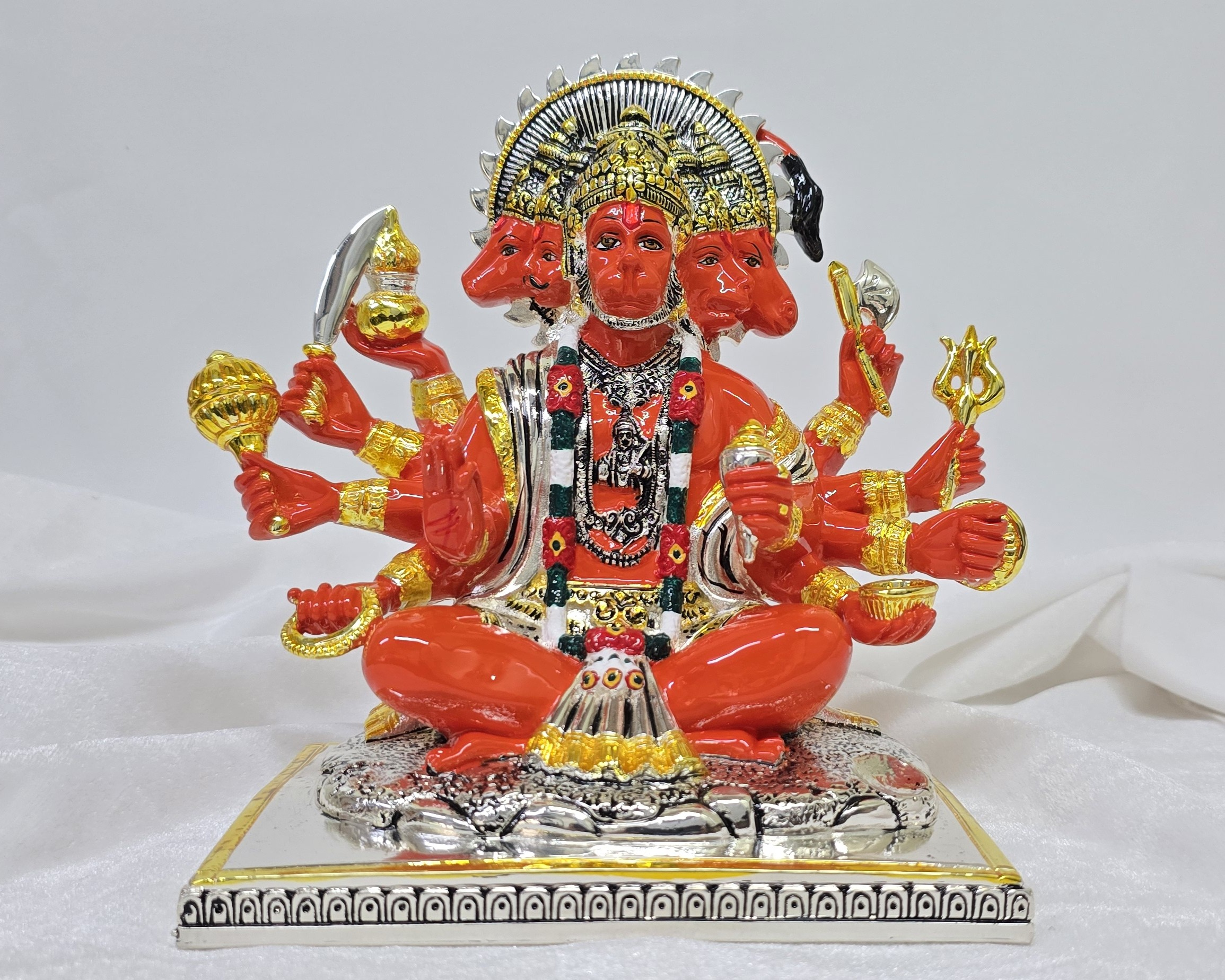
A handcrafted idol of Panchamukhi Hanuman

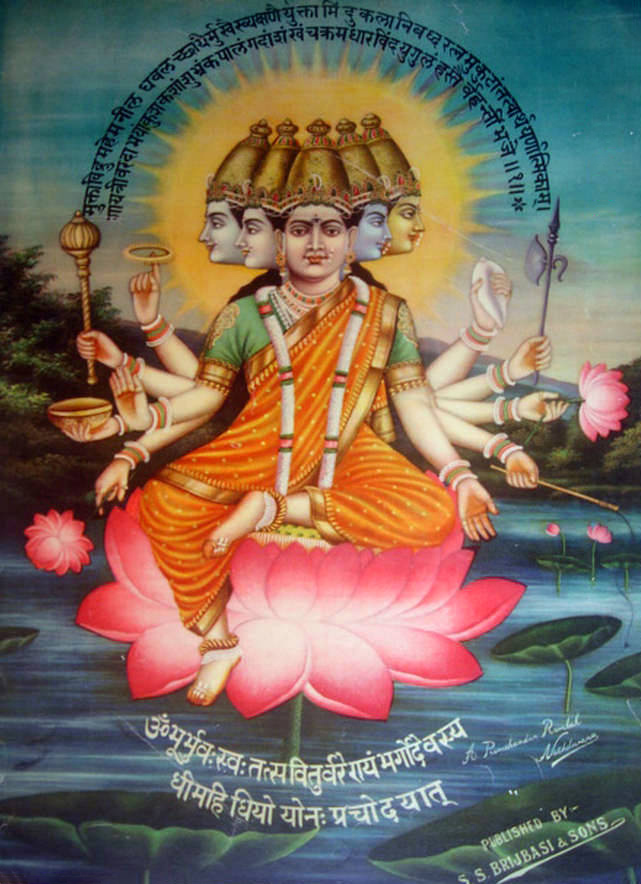
Bazaar art of Gayatri

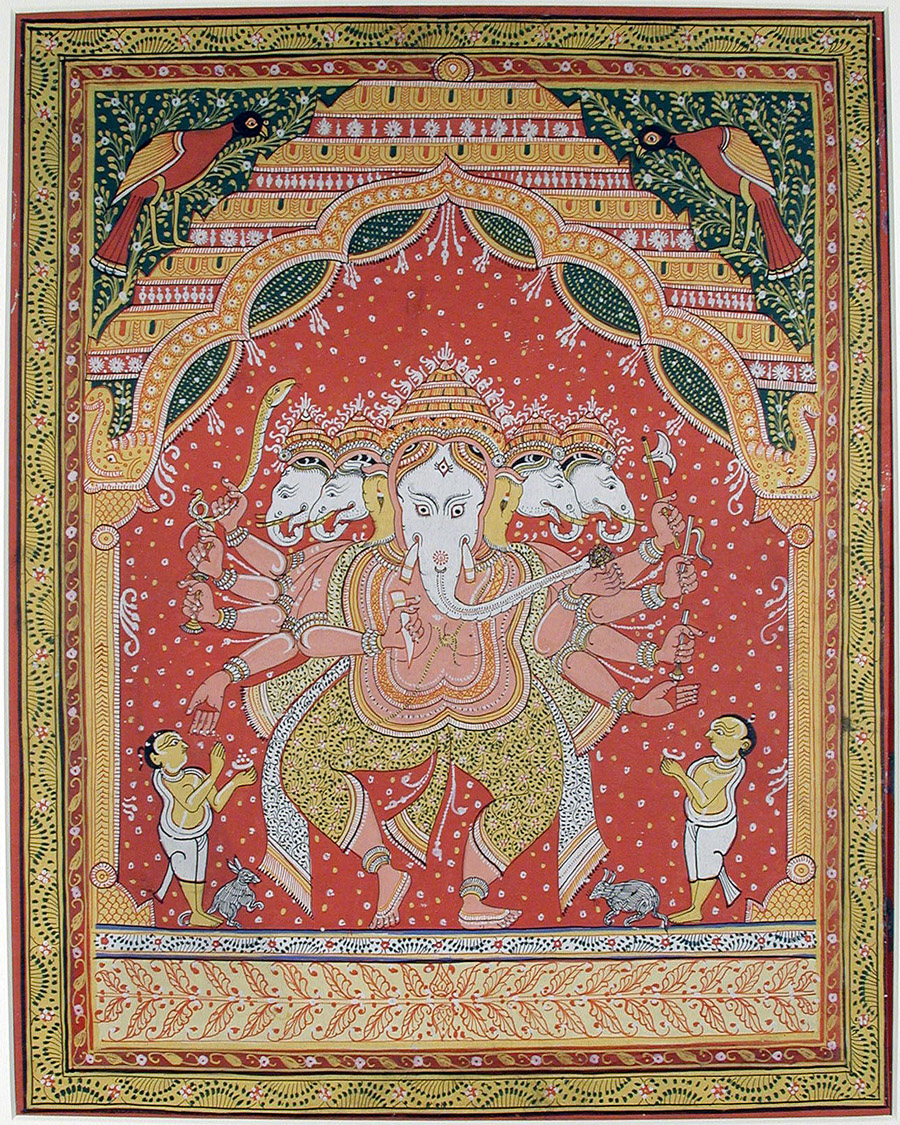
Painting of a five-headed Ganesha

== See also ==
- Hindu iconography
- Third eye
- Lingam
