= Parbrahm Ashram =

Hindu temple in Pakistan

- پاربرهم ڌام
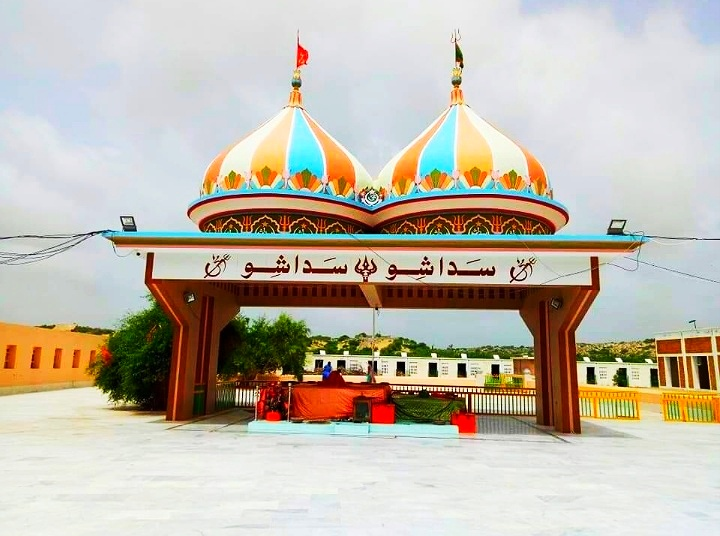
- Parbrahm Ashram

- Location within Sindh

Religion
- Affiliation: Hinduism
- District: Tharparkar
- Festival: Dada Parbriham/ Faqeer Parbirham Mela

Location
- Location: Diplo
- State: Sindh
- Country: Pakistan
- Coordinates: 24°34′58″N 69°36′10″E

Website
- https://verijhapdham.com

Fakeer Parbraham Astan or Parbirham Ashram or Faqir Parbraham ashram or Parbraham Ashram Verijhap is an ashram located in Verhi Jhap village in Diplo in Tharparkar district in the Sindh Province of Pakistan. The ashram is famous for its annual Dada Parbriham (Faqeer Parbirham) Mela which is attended by a large number of Hindus from Sindh and Balochistan.

== Faqeer Parbirham Mela ==
The festival is usually celebrated in the first week of June. The main ritual in the festival is the Chharhi Saheb Yatra and the sighting of the jyoti (light or flame). The Chharhi Saheb Yatra is the procession of devotees led by a man carrying the Chharri (elaborately decorated "trishul") to the temple in Verhi Jhap. The Chharri symbolises the spiritual power of the Shri Parbirham Sahib. During the procession, devotees recite religious chant. The next ritual is the sighting of the jyoti. It is a mysterious flame that is said to rise from a thick bush tree near the temple after the sunset. The devotees wait for hours to witness the Jyoti.

== See also ==
- Sant Nenuram Ashram
- Churrio Jabal Durga Mata Temple
- Ramapir Temple Tando Allahyar
- Umarkot Shiv Mandir
- Hinglaj Mata mandir
