= Diplo (disambiguation) =

Diplo (born 1978) is the stage name of Thomas Wesley Pentz, an American DJ, producer and songwriter.

Diplo may also refer to:

- Diplo (album), by Diplo, 2022
- Diplo, Sindh, Pakistan
- DiploFoundation, or simply Diplo, an international non-profit foundation
- Ramón Rivero (1909–1956), Puerto Rican actor, comedian and composer known by the mononym Diplo

== Other uses ==
- Le Monde diplomatique, an international monthly publication nicknamed Le Diplo

== See also ==
- Duplo, a version of Lego designed for toddlers
