= Mansehra Shiva Temple =

Hindu temple in Pakistan

Mansehra Shiv temple
- مانسہرہ شیو مندر د مانسهرې د شېوا معبد
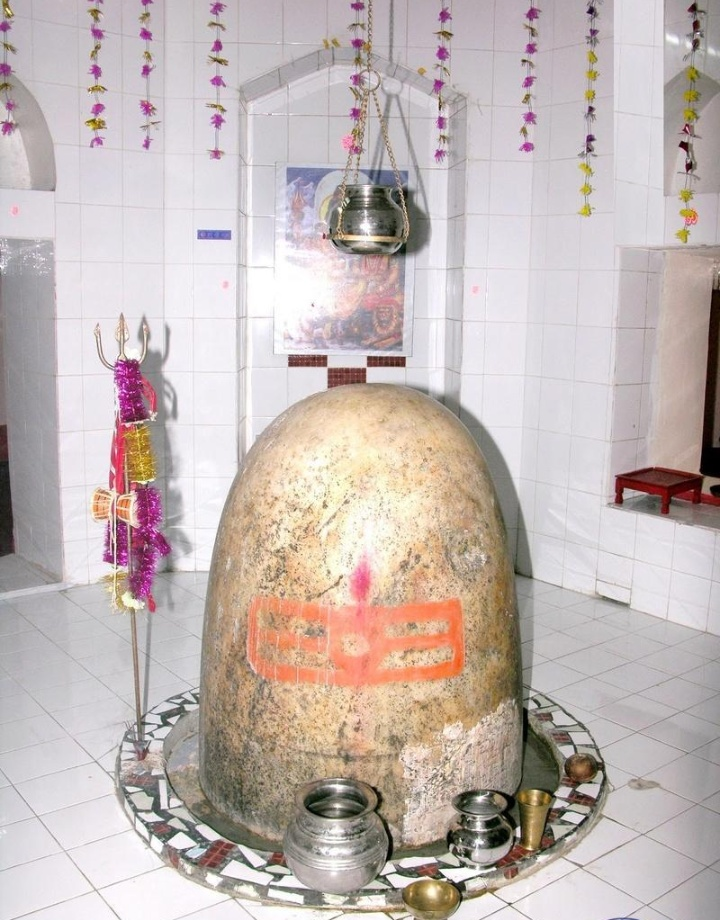
- 2000 year old Shivlinga in the Mansehra Shiv temple

- Location within Pakistan Location within Pakistan Location within Asia

Religion
- Affiliation: Hinduism
- District: Mansehra district
- Deity: Shiva Shivaratri
- Governing body: Shiv Temple Society

Location
- State: Khyber Pakhtunkhwa
- Country: Pakistan
- Coordinates: 34°23′51.5″N 73°13′07.3″E

Architecture
- Completed: 2000 years old (reconstructed in 1830s)
- Temple: 1

Mansehra Shiv Temple is one of the oldest Hindu temples in Pakistan that is still in existence. The Shiva lingam inside the temple is 2000 years old and the temple itself was reconstructed in the 1830s by the Raja of Jammu. The temple is situated in Chitti Gatti, 15 kilometres from Mansehra in Khyber Pakhtunkhwa in Pakistan. The annual Shivarathri festival in the temple is visited by people all around Pakistan and from abroad.

== History ==
According to the archaeological research there existed Hindu temples on the site where now the temple stands and the Shiva Lingam inside the temple is at least 2000 years old. The temple was restored in the 1830s by the Raja of Jammu as an act of devotion. During 1947–48, the temple was forcibly seized by some people and started occupying illegally. They also sealed up the temple on this site.

From 1948 to 2008, the temple remained sealed and abandoned. The temple remained inaccessible to Hindus till 1998. After that, the temple has been partially restored by the Pakistani Hindus.

== Gallery ==
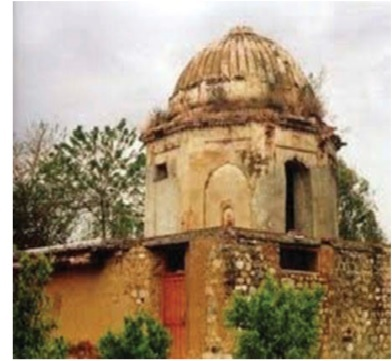
Mansehra Shiva Temple before renovation

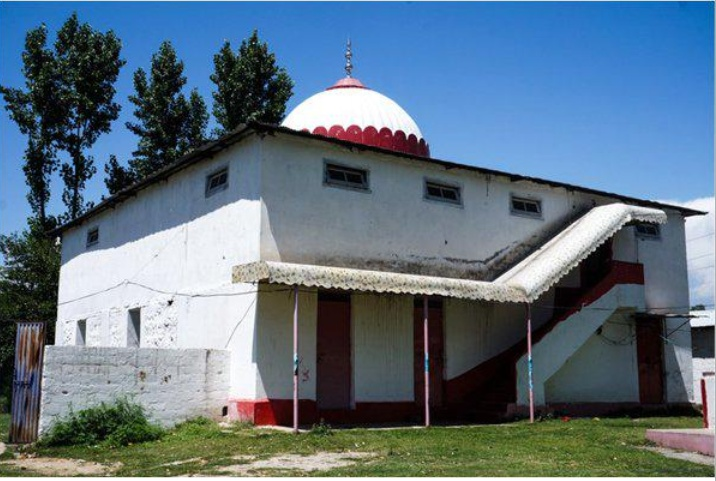
Mansehra Shiva Temple after renovation

== See also ==
- Churrio Jabal Durga Mata Temple
- Hinduism in Pakistan
- Goswamiparshotam Gir Chela Goswami Nihal Gir
- Hinduism in Khyber Pakhtunkhwa
