= Panchmukhi Hanuman Temple =

Historic Hindu temple in Pakistan

Shri Panchmukhi Hanuman Mandir
- شری پنکھ مکھی ہنومان مندر
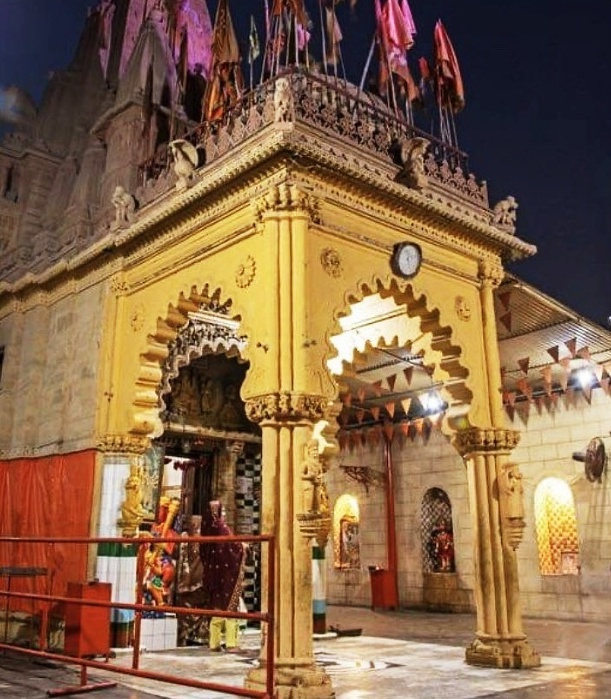

- Location within Sindh Location within Pakistan Location within Asia

Religion
- Affiliation: Hinduism
- District: Karachi East District
- Deity: Panchamukhi Hanuman
- Festivals: Diwali, Holi, Hanuman Jayanti

Location
- Location: Soldier Bazaar
- State: Sindh
- Country: Pakistan
- Coordinates: 24°51′38.2″N 67°01′14.1″E

Architecture
- Type: Hindu Temple
- Established: around 500 AD
- Temple: 1

Website
- Official website

The Panchmukhi Hanuman Mandir is a historic Hindu mandir in Karachi, Pakistan. The mandir was declared as a national heritage under the Sindh Cultural Heritage (Preservation) Act 1994 and is believed to be at least 1,500 years old.

== History ==
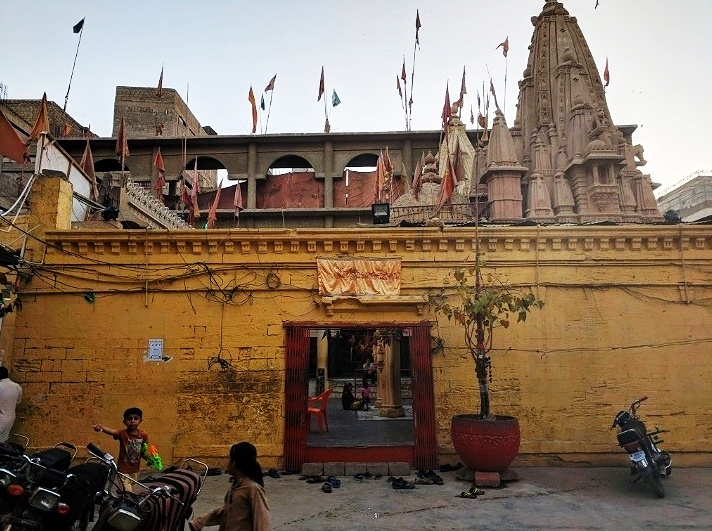
Side view of the temple.

The mandir is estimated to be built about 1500 years ago. It is believed that during exile, Rama visited the place where the temple stands. Centuries ago, an image of Hanuman was excavated and a mandir was built on the spot. Hindus believe that the image of Hanuman was divinely revealed, and that it was not man made.

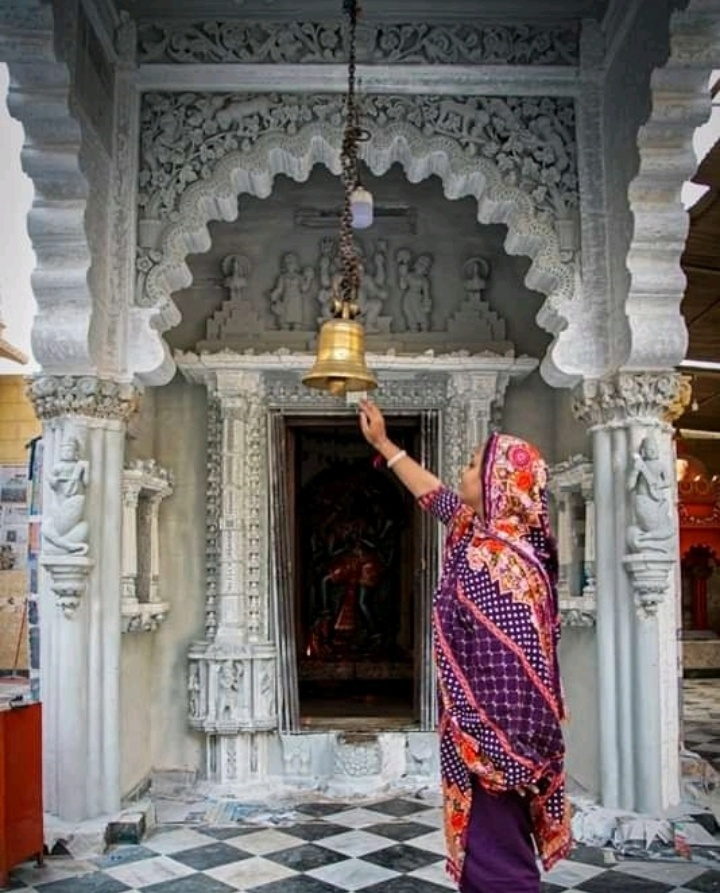
Devotee at Punchamukhi Hanuman temple

The mandir initially resided on a 2,609 square foot plot of land, but about half the land was later stolen. In 2006, the City District Government Karachi ordered that the land be returned to the temple in 2006. Despite the notice, the illegal land owners continue to reside on the land. In 2012, supported through donations collected from Hindu's locals and the Muttahida Qaumi Movement, renovation of the mandir began. In 2019, more artifacts were excavated including eight to nine images of Hanuman, preliminarily thought to be at least 300 years old by the director of the National Museum of Pakistan, Muhammad Shah Bukhari.

== See also ==
- Ramapir Temple Tando Allahyar
- Umarkot Shiv Mandir
- Darya Lal Mandir
- Hinglaj Mata mandir
- Kalka Cave Temple
- Parbrahm Ashram
