= Kalyan Das Temple =

19th-century Hindu temple in Rawalpindi, Pakistan

- Kalyan Das Mandir
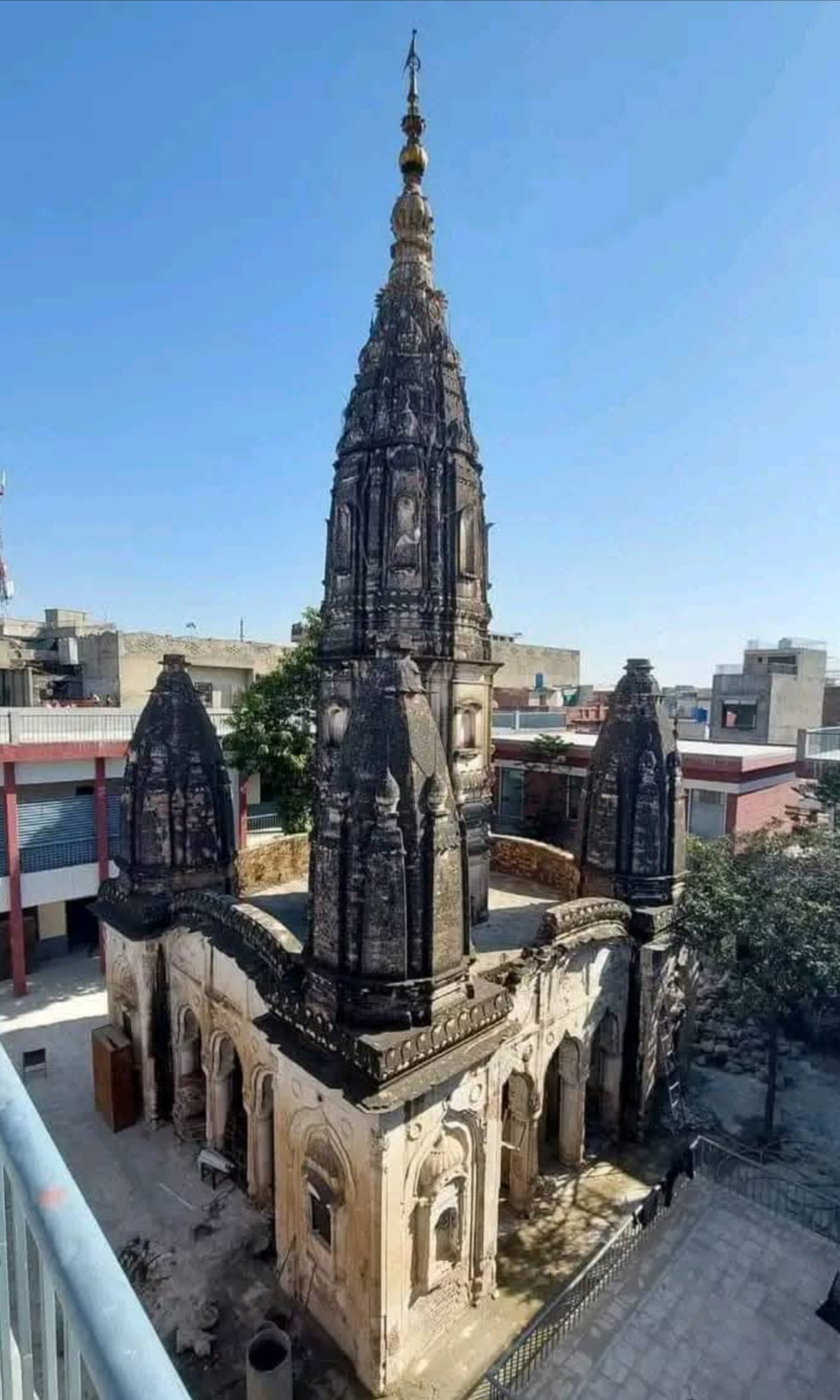

- Location in Pakistan

Religion
- Affiliation: Hinduism
- District: Rawalpindi District

Location
- Location: Kohati Bazaar, Rawalpindi
- State: Punjab
- Country: Pakistan
- Interactive map of Kalyan Das Temple
- Coordinates: 33°37′19″N 73°03′47″E

Architecture
- Type: Hindu temple, with shikhara towers and Mughal-influenced decorative motifs
- Founder: Kalyan Das Suri (Suri family)
- Established: c. 1850 (foundation)
- Completed: c. 1880

Kalyan Das Temple (Kalyan Das Mandir) is a 19th-century Hindu temple in Kohati Bazaar, Rawalpindi, Punjab, Pakistan. Commissioned by the Suri family and named after Kalyan Das Suri, the complex is distinguished by its tall shikhara-like towers and its interior murals and painted panels. Since the mid-twentieth century the temple compound has been occupied by a government school for visually impaired children, and the temple building itself has been reported as being in a state of neglect.

Before the Partition of 1947, the temple served as the traditional starting point for the Hindu community's pilgrimage to the Amarnath cave shrine in Jammu and Kashmir (princely state), with devotees reportedly walking barefoot from the temple through the Murree hills towards the caves.

== History ==
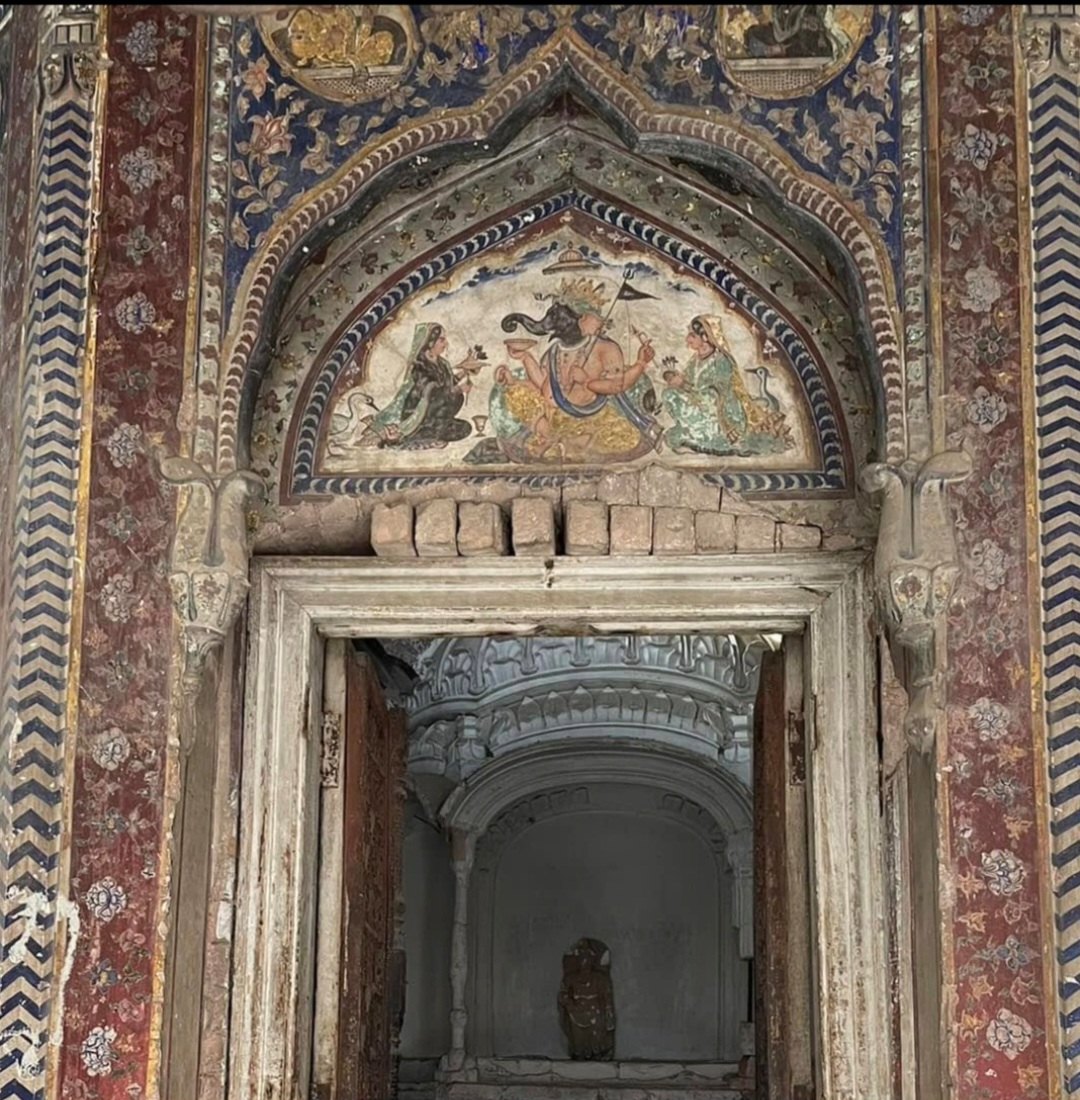
Murals depicting Ganesha at the Kalyan Das Temple

Construction of the Kalyan Das Temple is reported to have begun around 1850 and to have been completed by about 1880. The temple was commissioned by a prominent Hindu family of Rawalpindi, commonly identified in contemporary sources as the Suri family, and was named after Kalyan Das Suri.

Following the Partition of 1947, the temple ceased to serve a regular Hindu congregation as most of Rawalpindi's Hindu population migrated to India. Custodianship of the property subsequently passed to the Evacuee Trust Property Board. Portions of the temple compound were later developed as the site of the Government Qandeel Secondary School for the Blind, an institution for visually impaired children which has operated at the site since the 1950s and was nationalised in the early 1970s.

== Architecture and artwork ==
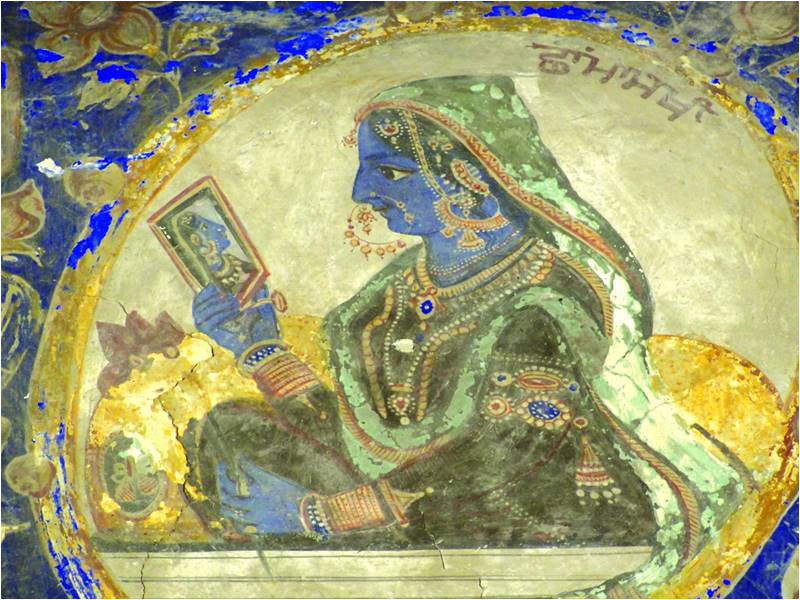
A depiction associated with the sakhi tradition of Krishna

The temple complex is distinguished by a cluster of prominent domed towers, known as shikharas, which rise above a modest courtyard. Carved panels and painted murals decorate the interior and the upper part of the temple entrance. These include representations of Hindu deities, among them Ganesha, as well as panels depicting scenes associated with Krishna and the nayika tradition.

Among the interior murals are depictions of the Trimurti, Brahma, Shiva and Vishnu, alongside frescoes bearing Gurmukhi inscriptions, one of which has been read as Shamaskhi, a reference to the narrative tradition of Krishna. Some of the murals are reported to incorporate pigments derived from lapis lazuli, a mineral historically sourced from Afghanistan. Architectural observers have noted that several decorative elements, particularly the arches and carved detailing, reflect Mughal-influenced motifs integrated with traditional Hindu temple forms.

== Current condition ==
Recent news reporting describes the temple as structurally intact but suffering from prolonged neglect and a lack of formal conservation. The main temple structure stands within the courtyard of the adjoining school for visually impaired children; school buildings and subsequent alterations have reduced its visibility from surrounding streets. Journalists and heritage commentators have called for preservation measures, noting that the temple continues to receive occasional visitors and remains a reminder of Rawalpindi's pre-Partition religious landscape.

== See also ==
- Hinduism in Punjab, Pakistan
- Hinduism in Pakistan
- List of Hindu temples in Pakistan
