= Shri Krishna Mandir, Gwadar =

Hindu temple in Gwadar, Pakistan

Shri Krishna Mandir
- شری کرشنا مندر

Religion
- Affiliation: Hinduism
- District: Gwadar District
- Deity: Krishna
- Governing body: Maintained by local Hindu community

Location
- Location: Shahi Bazaar, Gwadar
- State: Balochistan
- Country: Pakistan

Architecture
- Established: Estimated during Omani rule
- Completed: Unknown

Shri Krishna Mandir also known locally as Om Mandir, is a Hindu temple located in the historic Shahi Bazaar area of Gwadar, in the Balochistan province of Pakistan. It is situated opposite to the Third FP Marine Camp (Gwadar Marine Camp). The temple is situated adjacent to a Sunni mosque and an Ismaili Jamatkhana, exemplifying the city's tradition of religious harmony.

== History ==
The temple is believed to have been constructed during the period when Gwadar was under the rule of the Sultanate of Oman before the territory was ceded to Pakistan in 1958. The exact date of construction is unknown, but the structure is thought to be several decades or even centuries old. By the late 20th century, the temple had fallen into disrepair due to lack of resources and the gradual decline of the Hindu population in Gwadar.

== Restoration ==
In 2002, Shri Krishna Mandir was restored with the support of the local Muslim community and members of the Jamiat Ulema-e-Islam (JUI-F). The restoration effort was notable for its spirit of interfaith harmony and cooperation, as the temple is located in close proximity to a Sunni mosque and an Ismaili Jamatkhana.

== Community and Worship ==
Although the Hindu population in Gwadar is very small, the temple remains active and continues to host religious functions during festivals such as Janmashtami, Diwali, and Holi.

== See also ==
- Hinduism in Balochistan
- List of Hindu temples in Pakistan
- Gwadar
