= Soldier Bazaar =

Soldier Bazaar سولجر بازار
- Neighborhood
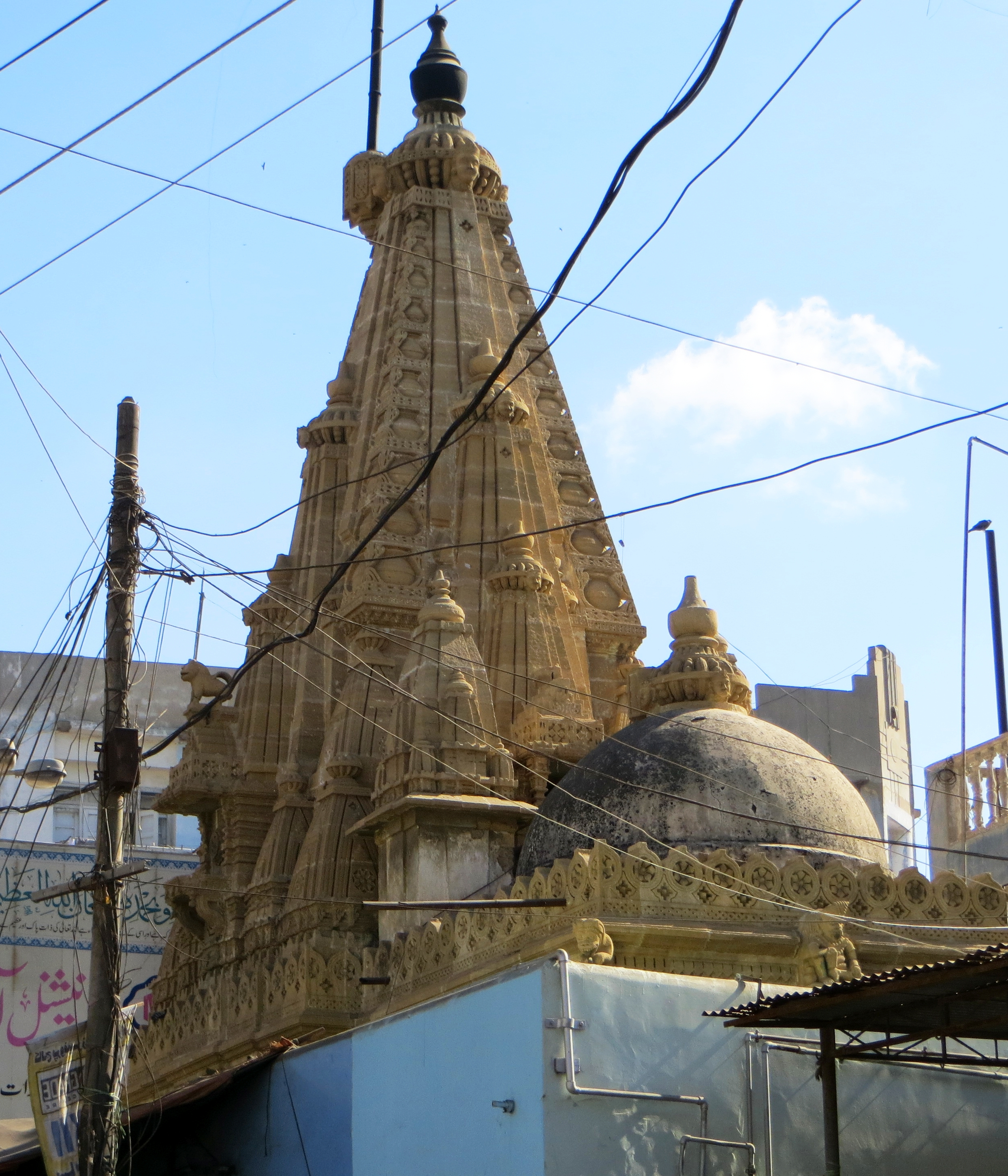
- Panchmukhi Hanuman Temple in Soldier Bazaar
- Interactive map of Soldier Bazaar
- Coordinates: 24°52′31.6″N 67°01′53.6″E
- Country: Pakistan
- Province: Sindh
- City: Karachi

Soldier Bazar (Urdu: سولجر بازار) is a bazaar and neighborhood in Karachi East district of Karachi, Pakistan. It was previously administered as part of Jamshed Town, which was disbanded in 2011.

== History ==
Soldier Bazar was constructed in 1857 next to Mazar Roshan Shah run by Muslim committee Muslim Jamaat Soldier Bazaar. Muslim Jamaat Soldier Bazaar donated funds of 3000 gold coins to All-India Muslim League in 1906, which were collected by Quaid-e-Azam Muhammad Ali Jinnah in Karachi.

The father of former Prime Minister Zulfikar Ali Bhutto, and the Khan of Kalat both owned bungalows here. G. M. Syed, who spearheaded the Pakistan Movement in Sindh also owned a bungalow here named Hyder Manzil. According to Syed's family, the Pakistan Resolution of 1943 was written there before its introduction and passage in the Sindh Assembly.

In 1954, the Soldier Bazaar Market was established. The building serves as a marketplace for food items, and was built in a 1950s modernist style.

== Location ==
The market is centered on Clayton Road, and runs from Madina Road in the west near the Holy Family Hospital, to Gurmandir in the east near Mazar-e-Quaid. Several roads run parallel to Clayton Road that form part of the neighborhood. Chaitram Street runs parallel to the north of Clayton Road. North of Soldier Bazaar is Cincinnatus Town, established by Goan Catholics with its neo-Mughal St. Lawrence's Church. Rodrigues Road, Tailor Street, and Shahnawaz Bhutto Road run parallel to the south of Clayton Road. To the south of Shahnawaz Bhutto Road is a posh area where Nishtar Park and Parsi Colony are located.

== See also ==
- Urdu Bazaar
- Bohri Bazaar
- Panchmukhi Hanuman Temple
