= Basuli Hanuman temple =

Hindu temple in Lahore, Pakistan

Religion
- Affiliation: Hinduism
- Sect: Vaishnavism
- Deity: Hanuman
- Ecclesiastical or organisational status: Defunct as a religious site, used as a private residence

Location
- Location: Old Anarkali, Lahore, Punjab, Pakistan

Architecture
- Completed: c. 1890's or early 20th century

Basuli Hanuman temple, also known as the Bansi Mandir, is a Hindu temple located in Anarkali Bazaar, Lahore in Punjab, Pakistan. It was constructed in the 19th century (perhaps in the 1890s) or early 20th century. It was abandoned after the partition in 1947 and the complex has since been repurposed as a place of residence. After the 1992 Babri Masjid incident, locals carved off the faces in the depictions of the deities Hanuman and Krishna found in the temple. No conservation attempts have been made on the temple. In 2024, footage emerged of the temple's premises being used as a toilet.

The temple complex contains a tall shikhara, a courtyard, and a haveli, which consists of jharokha on its facade. The wall engravings written in Sanskrit and the sculptures of the gods are scratched out.
