= Banda Piran =

Coordinates: 34°25′N 73°13′E

Bhanda Peeran Pir killey
- Village
- Interactive map of Bhanda Peeran
- Country: Pakistan
- Province: Khyber Pakhtunkhwa
- District: Mansehra
- Time zone: UTC+5 (PST)

Banda Piran or Bhanda Peeran (Urdu: بانڈه بيران) is a village of Mansehra District in the Khyber Pakhtunkhwa province of Pakistan. The River Siran flows from north to south of the village where mostly farmers use its water for agricultural purposes.

== History ==
The Commonwealth War Graves Commission has details of a Sepoy with the surname Kachkol of the Royal Indian Army Service Corps who died in October 1943 during World War 2 in Burma - he is recorded as being the son of Nawab and Suban Jan; husband of Sosan Jan, of Banda Piran, Hazara.

Following the 2005 earthquake hundreds of people in Banda Piran took to the streets in heavy rain to protest the lack of action by the government to rebuild infrastructure and also for police action to tackle rising crime.

== Etymology ==
Banda Piran, also known as Peran Da Bandha in Hindko and Peer Keeley in Pushto, means "The Land of Saints." Banda means land and piran means saints similarly peer means saint and kalay means village. Historians say that Muslim Saints used to live in this area at the beginning of the 15^{th} century.
