= Gandhian, Mansehra =

Pakistani village

Gandhian
- Village
- Location within Pakistan
- Coordinates: 34°23′44″N 73°12′30″E
- Country: Pakistan
- Province: Khyber-Pakhtunkhwa
- Division: Hazara
- District: Mansehra
- Tehsil: Mansehra
- Elevation: 1,020 m (3,350 ft)
- Time zone: UTC+5 (PKT)
- ISO 3166 code: PK

Gandhian is a village of Mansehra District in the Khyber Pakhtunkhwa province of Pakistan. It is located at 34°23'44N 73°12'30E with an altitude of 1020 metres. The village contains an ancient temple that attracts Hindus for the annual Maha Shivaratri festival which has grown in popularity over recent years from small beginnings in 1988.

In July 1848, during the Second Anglo-Sikh War, there was a Sikh Brigade based in Gandhian that was reportedly disaffected with the British authorities - the following month a wholesale rebellion began in Hazara.

== About Gandhian ==
Gandhian is located on the main Karakoram Highway and is about 7 km away from the district capital Mansehra. A tributary of the Siran River flows through this village. Natural springs in Gandhian are source of fresh natural water. Gandhian is known for being the site of the unique Shiv Temple which lies in of Chitti Gatti - which thousands of Hindus travel to from across Pakistan.

The terrain of this area consists of plain fields, plateau and hilly areas. Land used for agriculture purpose is very rich and fertile in nature. The main crops of village are wheat, vegetables, maize and tobacco. Whereas fruits like apricot, plum, almond, apple and peach are also found here. The literacy rate of this village is quite encouraging. Private sector educational institutions are growing in number.

Most of the population of Gandhian are Sunni Muslim with a minority being Shia and there is also a Hindu community in the region. 90% of the population of this village speaks Hindko as their mother tongue, while remaining speaks Gojari, Pashto and other languages. Main tribes of this area are Tanoli, Gurjars, Ghakkar (Raja), Syed, Maliktanoli and Sulemani.

The village name "Gandhian" is derived from the name of the indigenous Khatri tribe, "Gandhi" being the name of a Khatri Clan. Sikh presence in this region was also pronounced during the Sikh Empire era. In the ensuing violence of the Partition of India, tribes formerly native to this area including Hindko-speaking Khatris and Brahmins fled for the newly formed Republic of India where they settled in large numbers in Delhi, along with other non-Muslim Hindkowans. Some, having converted to Islam, were subsumed into Islamic tribes and Biradris.
