= Kheal Das Kohistani =

Pakistani politician

Member of the National Assembly of Pakistan
- In office 13 August 2018 – 10 August 2023
- Constituency: Reserved seat for minorities

Personal details
- Born: Karachi, Sindh, Pakistan
- Party: PMLN (2018-present)

Kheal Das Kohistani (کھیل داس کوہستانی) is a Pakistani politician who had been a member of the National Assembly of Pakistan from August 2018 till August 2023. He is the Minister of State for Religious Affairs and Interfaith Harmony.

== Political career ==
He was elected to the National Assembly of Pakistan as a candidate of Pakistan Muslim League (N) on a reserved seat for minorities in the 2018 Pakistani general election.

In 2025, he was attacked by nationalist party members. This was strongly condemned by Prime Minister Shehbaz Sharif.
