= Chitti Gatti =

Pakistani hamlet

Coordinates: 34°24′N 73°13′E

Chitti Gatti is a hamlet that is part of Gandhian village in Mansehra District in the Khyber-Pakhtunkhwa province of Pakistan. It is part of Inayatabad union council and lies in the Mansehra Tehsil of Hazara. Since early times, it is especially notable for two Hindu festivals which occur on 6th Phagan and on 1st Baisakh, as mentioned by an early Settlement Report;, dedicated to the worship of the deity Shiva. The present old Mansehra Shiva Temple here on this site, which has been recently restored, was originally constructed by a Raja of Jammu in the 1830s as an act of devotion. According to the latest archaeological research, there were probably earlier Hindu temples on this same site, but the ancient Shiva Lingam (or Ling) inside the temple's precincts is truly ancient and at least 2000 years old. The temple and Lingam still attract many Hindu pilgrims and tourists each year, especially at the time of the annual Maha Shivratri festival.
