= Goswamiparshotam Gir Chela Goswami Nihal Gir =

Hindu temple in Pakistan

Coordinates: 25.4005406°N 68.3712331°E

- Shiv Shanker Mahadev Temple

Religion
- Affiliation: Hinduism
- District: Hyderabad
- Deity: Shiva, Hanuman

Location
- State: Sindh
- Country: Pakistan
- Interactive map of Goswamiparshotam Gir Chela Goswami Nihal Gir

Architecture
- Type: Hindu temple
- Established: 1895

The Shiv Mandir, Hyderabad or Shiv Shanker Mahadev temple or Goswamiparshotam Gir Chela Goswami Nihal Gir temple is a Hindu temple located in the Tando Wali Muhammad area in the Hyderabad District in the Sindh province of Pakistan. It is a century old temple.

== History ==
The temple was built in 1895. Later it was rebuilt in 1945 by Parshotam Gir, who was a student (chelo) of Shaivite renouncer Swami Nihal Gir.

After the formation of Pakistan the temple had not been operational for a long time and its surrounding areas were encroached upon. In 2021, the temple was renovated.

== See also ==
- Hinglaj Mata mandir
- Ramapir Temple, Tando Allahyar
- Churrio Jabal Durga Mata Temple
