= Panj Tirath =

Hindu pilgrimage site in Peshawar, Pakistan

- Location within Pakistan Location within Pakistan Location within Asia

Religion
- Affiliation: Hinduism
- District: Peshawar District
- Governing body: Government of Khyber Pakhtunkhwa

Location
- Location: Hashtnagri
- State: Khyber Pakhtunkhwa
- Country: Pakistan
- Interactive map of Panj Tirath
- Coordinates: 34°00′36″N 71°34′14″E

Architecture
- Completed: c. 1st millennium
- Temple: 2

Panj Tirath (Urdu: پنج تیرتھ) is an ancient Hindu pilgrimage site located in the Hashtnagri area of Peshawar, Khyber Pakhtunkhwa, Pakistan. The site historically consisted of five sacred water pools and associated temple structures and is regarded as one of the oldest Hindu religious sites in the city.

== History ==
Panj Tirath is believed to be more than 1,000 years old. According to historical accounts, the site included two temples, five water pools, and a large open area shaded by trees, and served as a pilgrimage destination for Hindus from across the region. Local tradition associates the site with ritual bathing during the Hindu month of Kartik, and annual gatherings were historically held at the complex prior to the mid-20th century.

Following the Partition of India in 1947 and the migration of much of the local Hindu population, religious activity at Panj Tirath declined and the site gradually fell into disrepair.

== Heritage designation ==
In January 2019, the Government of Khyber Pakhtunkhwa declared Panj Tirath a protected heritage site under the Khyber Pakhtunkhwa Antiquities Act, 2016. The notification made damage or unauthorised alteration of the site a criminal offence, punishable by fines and imprisonment.

== Legal dispute ==
Despite its protected status, Panj Tirath became the subject of a legal dispute concerning land use and management. Portions of the site were located within the premises of a privately operated amusement park established on land leased by local authorities, leading to disagreements over access and preservation.

In February 2023, the Peshawar High Court took up petitions related to the site and expressed concern that the dispute had remained unresolved for several years despite the heritage declaration. The court summoned senior provincial officials and sought clarification regarding land demarcation and access for the archaeology department.

Later in 2023, the dispute was addressed through a memorandum of understanding between the Evacuee Trust Property Board and the Khyber Pakhtunkhwa Directorate of Archaeology and Museums. Under the agreement, a defined portion of land was allocated for heritage protection and conservation responsibilities were shared between the two bodies.

Following the agreement, the Peshawar High Court disposed of the pending petitions related to the site.

== See also ==
- Gorakhnath Temple
- Kalibari Mandir, Peshawar
- Katasraj temple
