= Churrio Jabal Durga Mata Temple =

Hindu temple in Sindh, Pakistan

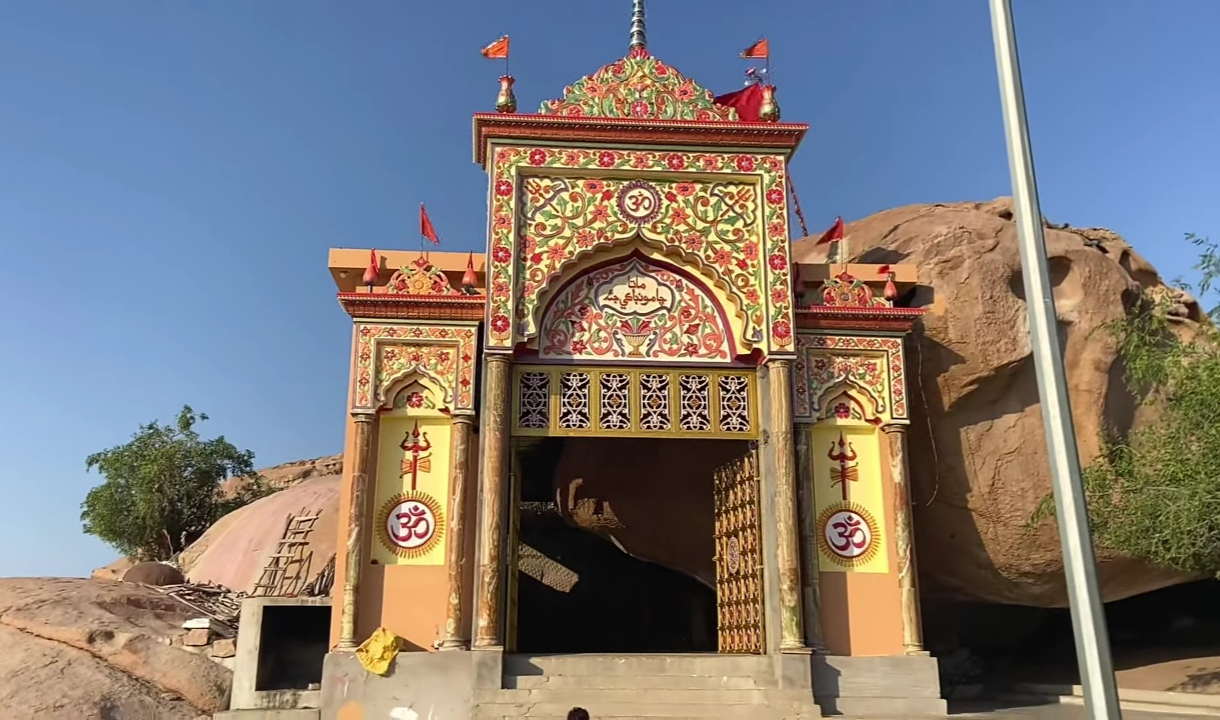
- Entrance of Churrio Jabal Durga Mata temple.

- Location within Sindh

Religion
- Affiliation: Hinduism
- District: Tharparkar
- Deity: Durga

Location
- Location: Nagarparkar
- State: Sindh
- Country: Pakistan
- Interactive map of Churrio Jabal Durga Mata Temple
- Coordinates: 24°24′01.5″N 71°03′53.0″E

Architecture
- Type: Hindu temple

Churrio Jabal Durga Mata Temple (چوڙيو جبل, pronunciation: choo-ryo ja-bal) is situated on a hill named Churrio, located in Nangarparkar in the Tharparkar District in the Sindh province of Pakistan. Hindus bring cremated ashes of their departed beloveds to immerse in the holy water in the temple. The valuable and multi-coloured hill supporting the temple is mined for its rare and expensive granite, which is posing a serious threat to the temple.

== Etymology ==
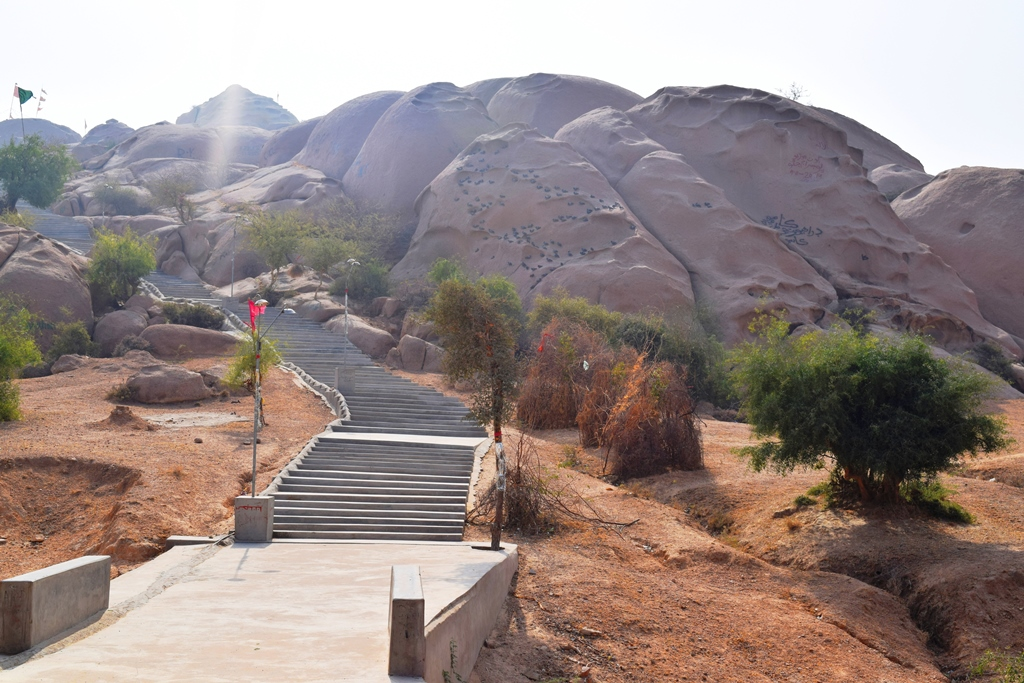
Way leading to the Temple

Churrio (Choryo) is a Sindhi language word, derived from a word (چوڙي), pronounced as (Choo-rree), which means 'a bangle'; thus the word Churrio — an adjective in Sindhi language — means "belonging to/related to bangles", because in the vicinity of the hill there are a number of small villages that have historically remained attached to the profession of manufacturing bangles for women. These locally manufactured bangles are then transported to the nearby towns like Nangarparkar up to Mithi in the west and Umerkot in the north. Accordingly, culturally, the women of the area dress in heavily embroidered clothes with bangles adorning their wrists.

== Significance ==
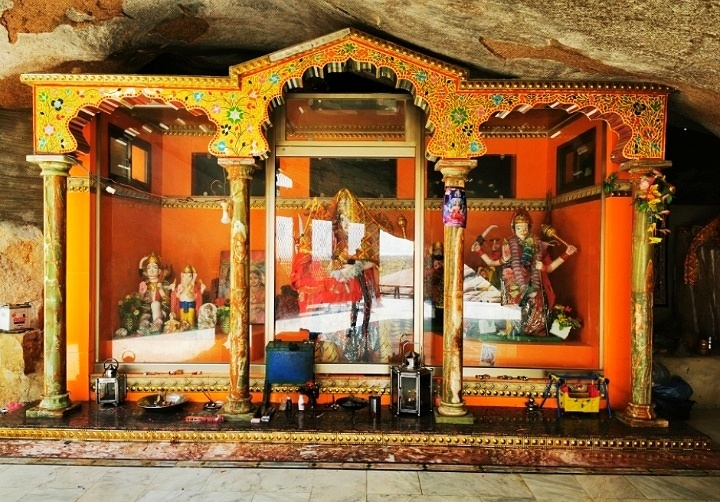
Inside the Churio jabal temple

Durga Mata temple, on Churrio Jabal hill in Chorrio village is dedicated to the Hindu goddess Durga, who is attributed as destroyer of evil, triumph of good over evil, the mother of universe, and power behind the creation, preservation, and destruction of the world. Thousands of pilgrims, not only from Pakistan, especially the provinces of Sindh, Baluchistan, Punjab and Khyber Pakhtunkhwa, but also from Nepal, India and other countries visit Churrio Hill for their religious festivals. The temple is a part of Hindu religious and cultural heritage in Sindh, Pakistan. On Shivratri 200,000 pilgrims visit the temples. Hindus cremate the dead and ashes are preserved until Shivratri for immersion into holy water. Richer Pakistani Hindus go to India to immerse the ashes in Ganges and the rest visit Nagarparkar to immerse the ashes. However the area has been leased by the government for the mining by dynamite blasting of the hills on which the temples are located. This is posing a threat to the temples. Pilgrims held a protest against the destruction of this area by the miners.

== Mining ==
The Churrio Hill on which the temple exist is formed of granite. Compared to the neighbouring areas of Rajasthan in India, where the granite is grey, the granite colour formation in Churrio is multicoloured and hence expensive.

Mining is posing serious danger to the Hindu temples of the area. The Hindu community protested against the mining. Despite opposition by local Hindus, the digging work is going ahead. Instead of trying to put a stop to the digging activity, the Sindh government has issued a lease to a contractor to carry out the work.

== Gallery ==
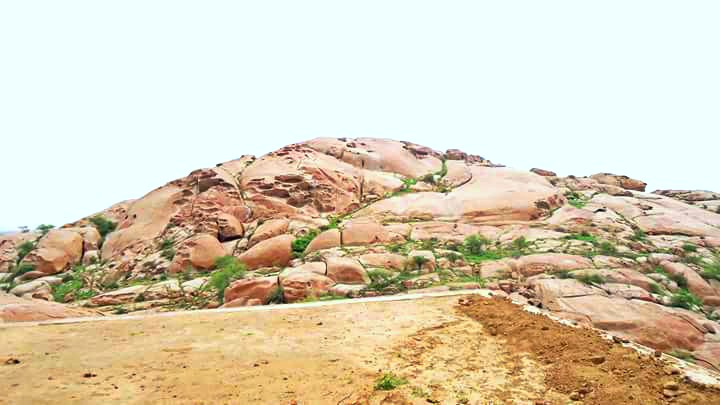
Churrio Jabal (Churrio Hill)

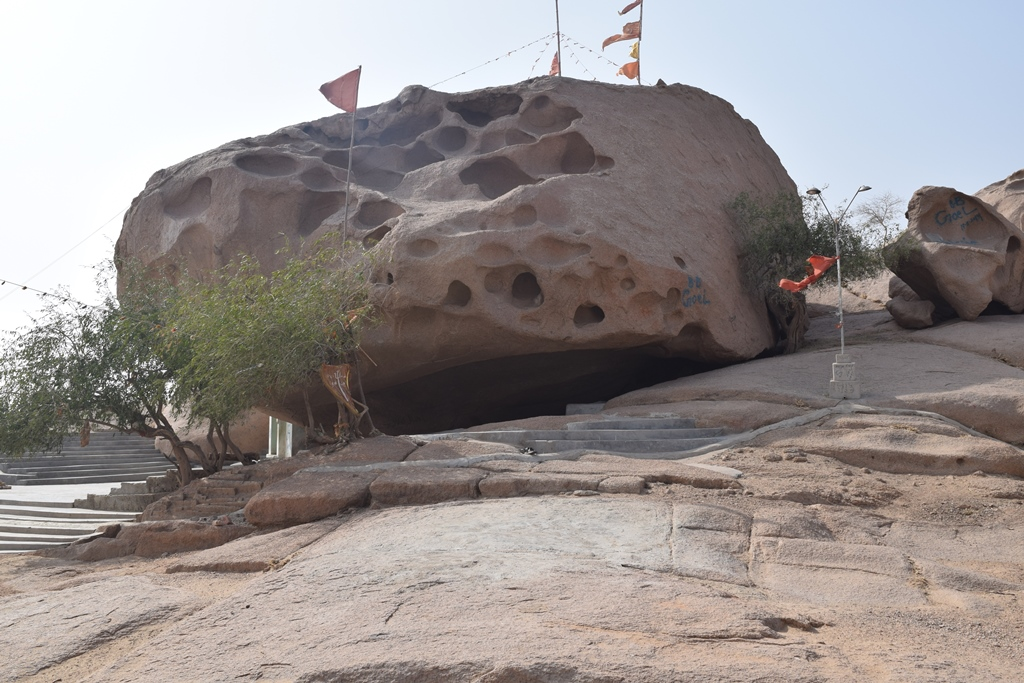
Way leading to Churrio Jabal temple

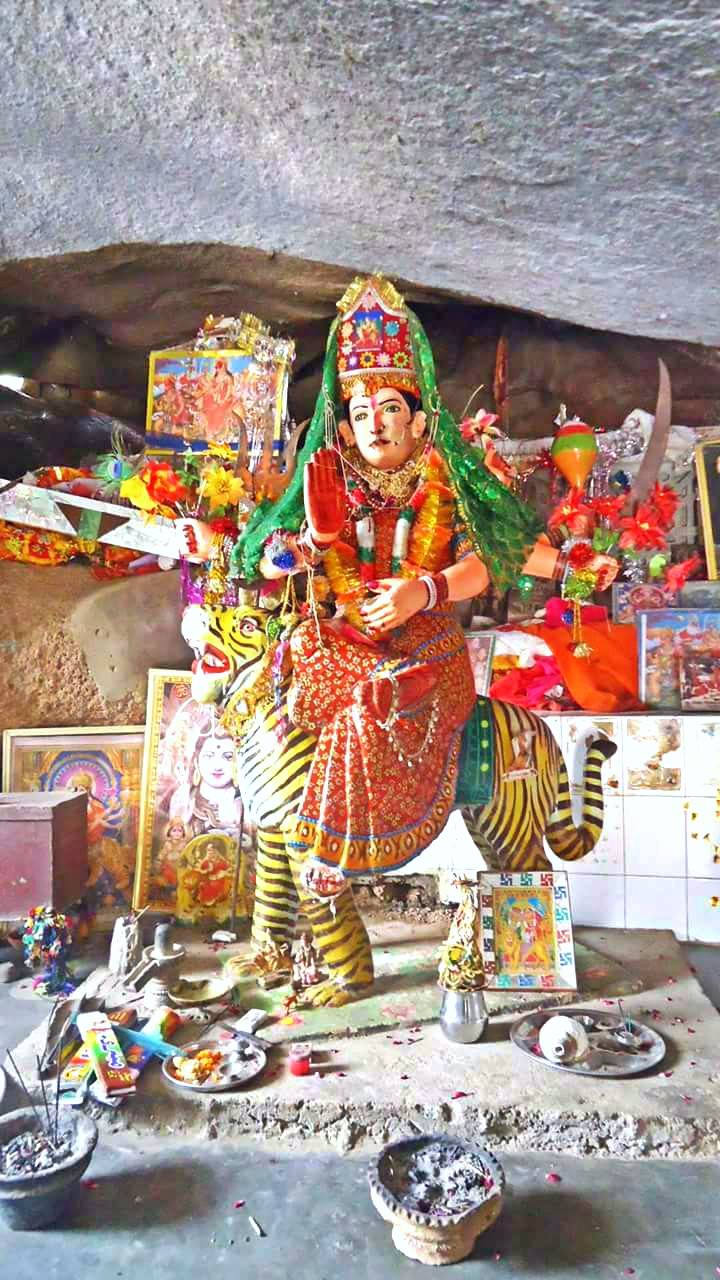
Churrio Durga temple is under threat from the dynamite mining

== See also ==
- Panj Tirath
- Ramapir Temple Tando Allahyar
- Umarkot Shiv Mandir
