= Diplo, Sindh =

Town in Sindh, Pakistan

Diplo ڏيپلو
- Town
- Location within Sindh Location within Pakistan
- Coordinates: 24°28′0″N 69°35′2″E
- Country: Pakistan
- Province: Sindh
- Division: Mirpur Khas
- District: Tharparkar

Population (2023)
  - Total: 13,257
- Time zone: UTC+5 (PST)

Diplo (Sindhi: ڏيپلو, pronounced [deː.ploː], Urdu: ڈِپلو, pronounced [dɪp.loː]) is a town in south-eastern Sindh, Pakistan. According to the 2023 census, it had a population of 13,257. The settlement functions as a town council and serves as the administrative centre of Diplo Tehsil in Tharparkar District.

It is situated in the Thar Desert, about 45 kilometres (28 mi) south-west of the district headquarters at Mithi, and lies near the international border with India, adjoining the Kutch District of Gujarat. The town is a Hindu majority town, with about 60% following it.
