= Kalka Cave Temple =

Hindu temple in Sindh, Pakistan

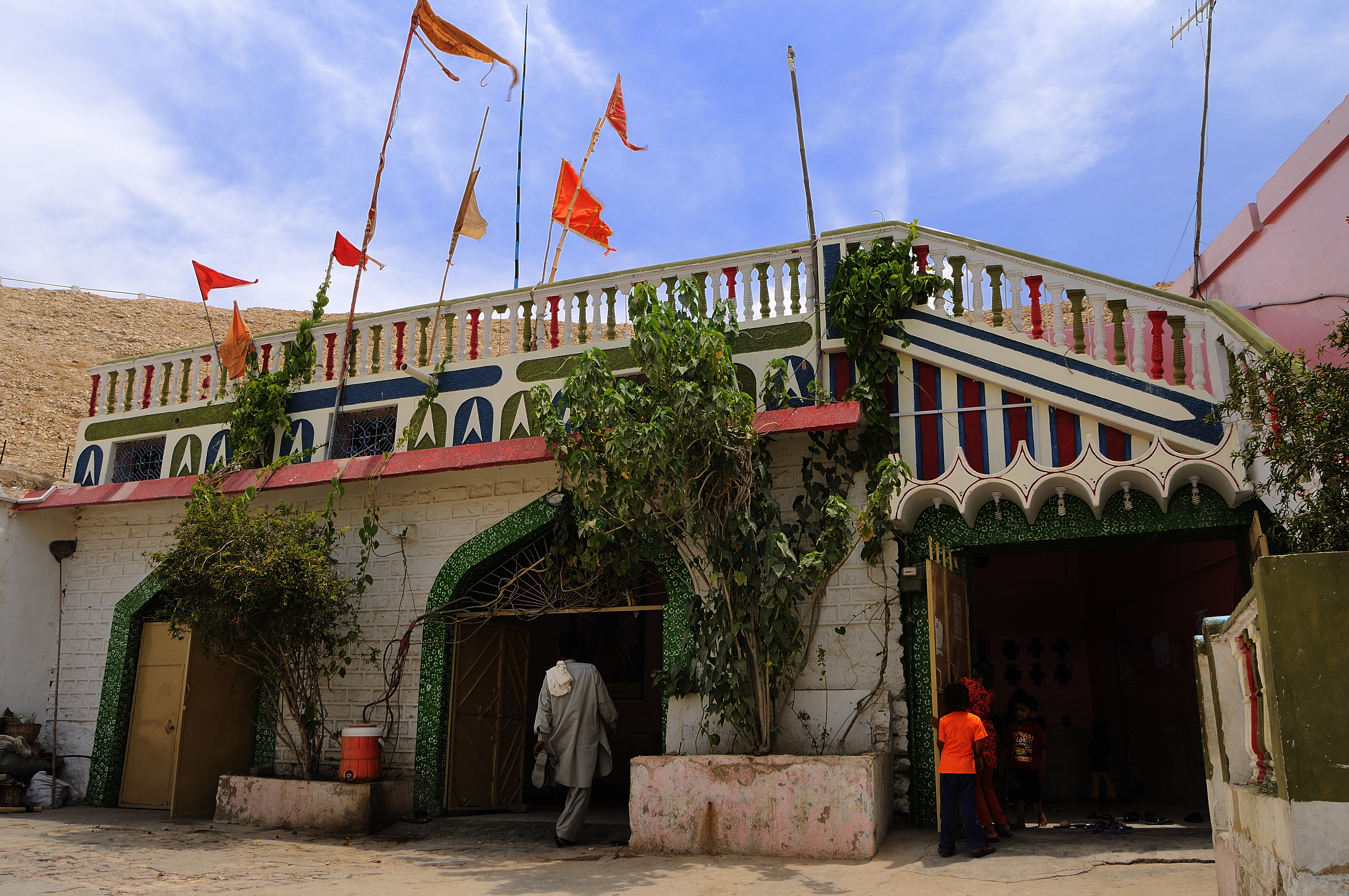
- View of Kalka Cave Temple

- Location within Sindh Location within Pakistan Location within Asia

Religion
- Affiliation: Hinduism
- District: Sukkur District
- Deity: Kali
- Festival: Navaratri

Location
- Location: Rohri
- State: Sindh
- Country: Pakistan
- Coordinates: 27°37′33.8″N 68°55′51.3″E

Architecture
- Type: Hindu Temple

The Kalka Devi Temple, Kalka Devi Cave Temple or Kalka Devi Mandir is considered by Hindus to be one of their holiest temples in Pakistan. It is situated inside a natural cave in the Kalka hills in Rohri (near the ruins of Aror), Sindh province, Pakistan. The temple is known as the Asthan of Kalka Devi. It is visited by both Hindus and Muslims. Hindus from India also visit. The majority of devotees visiting the temple are non-Hindus.

== Significance ==
It is a historic Hindu temples in Pakistan. According to the legend, the Hindu goddess Kalka Devi appeared on this place on her way to the Hinglaj Mata temple. According to the caretaker of the temple, there are two tunnels in the Kalka Cave temple which connect to the Hinglaj Mata temple. The temple is dedicated to the Hindu goddess Kali. Devotees visit the temple on evening of the first Monday of every month.

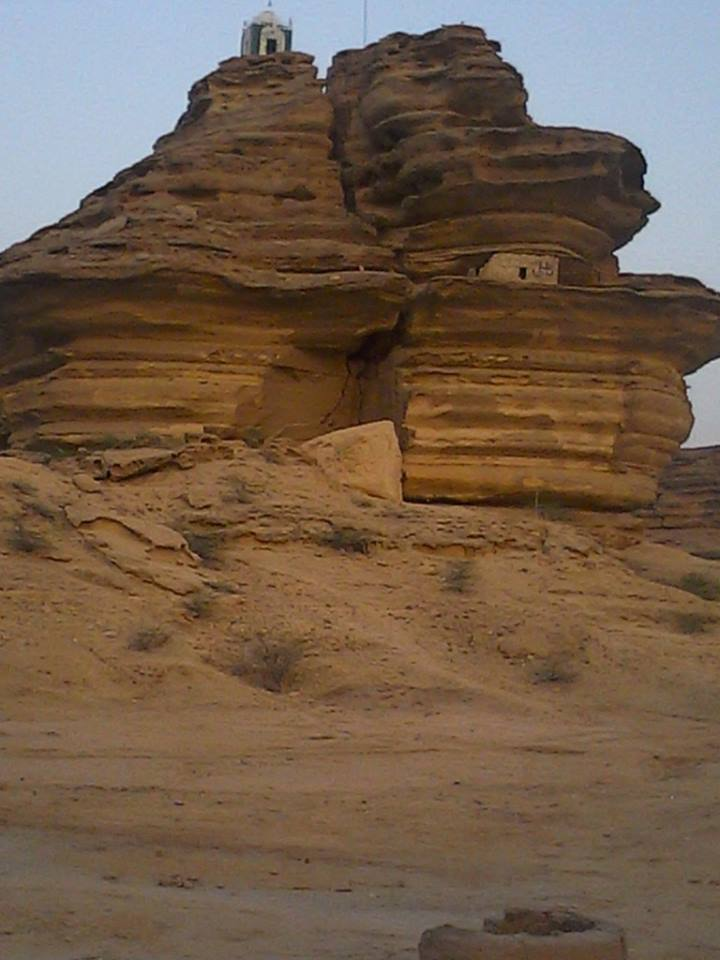
Behind Kalka cave temple, 2015.
