= Umarkot Shiv Mandir =

Hindu temple in Sindh, Pakistan

- عمرڪوٽ شيو مندر عمرڪوٽ شيو مندر उमरकोट शिव मन्दिर
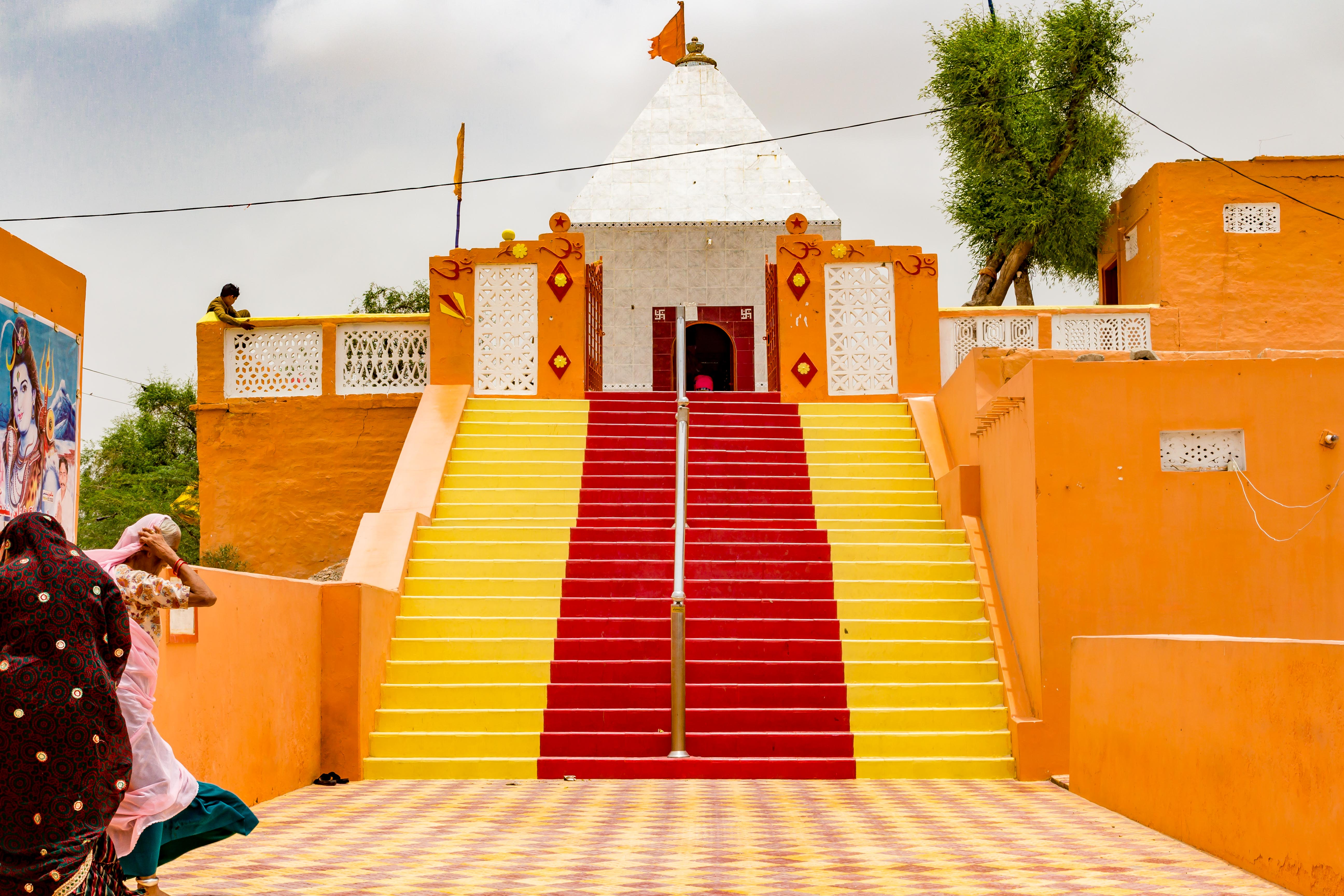
- Umerkot Shiv Mandir

- Location within Sindh

Religion
- Affiliation: Hinduism
- District: Umerkot District
- Deity: Shiva
- Festivals: Shivaratri, Diwali
- Governing body: Pakistan Hindu Panchayat

Location
- Location: Umerkot
- State: Sindh
- Country: Pakistan
- Coordinates: 25°24′58.7″N 69°46′34.5″E

Architecture
- Type: Hindu temple
- Temple: 1

Umarkot Shiv Mandir (Urdu: شِو مندِر), also known as Amarkot Shiv Mandir, is a Hindu temple situated in Umerkot District, near Rana Jaageer Goth, in Sindh province of Pakistan. This temple is one of the most sacred, and perhaps the oldest, Hindu places of worship in Sindh.

== History ==
According to the legend, thousands of years ago a man used to nourish cows here, where there was wide patches of grown grass. But eventually he noticed that one of his cows would go somewhere else and give her milk to a Lingam nearby. The man kept an eye on his cow and investigated her peculiar behaviour. Subsequently, people visited the area and after checking they concluded that it was a Shiv Lingam. Thus, Shiv Mandir was built. The current structure of the temple was built by a Muslim man a century ago.

== Deity ==
The presiding deity of the temple is Shiva in the form of a magnificent Shiv Lingam. Behind the main temple, there is a shrine dedicated to Goddess Durga.

== Festival ==
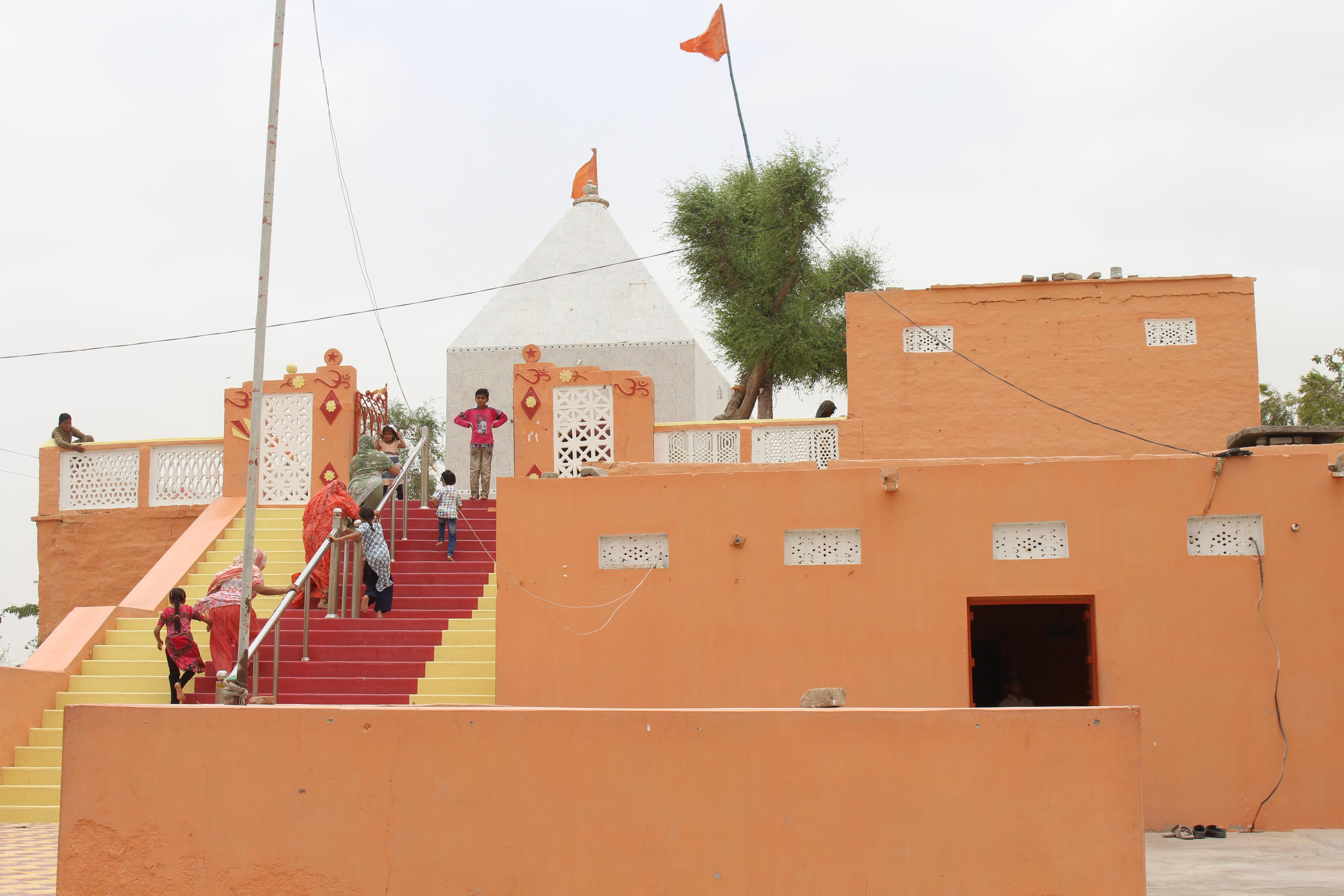

Every year on Maha Shivaratri, there is a huge three-day festival. On Maha Shivratri, many pilgrims from lower and upper Sindh come and most of them stay for the three days of festivities. It is one of the biggest religious festivals in the country. It is attended by around 250,000 people. All the expenses were borne by the All Hindu Panchayat of Umarkot.

== See also ==
- Hinduism in Pakistan
- Shiv temple, Hyderabad
- Shri Hinglaj Mata temple
- Kalat Kali Temple
- Katasraj temple
- Prahladpuri Temple, Multan
- Sadh Belo
- Shri Varun Dev Mandir
