= Umerkot (disambiguation) =

Umerkot is a town in Sindh, Pakistan.

Umerkot may also refer to:

- Umerkot District, an administrative unit of Sindh, Pakistan
- Umerkot Fort, a fort in Pakistan

== See also ==
- Umerkote, a town in Odissa, India
- Umerkote (Odisha Vidhan Sabha constituency), a constituency of Nabarangpur district, India
