= Pir Pithoro =

Muslim Pir venerated by Meghwar Hindus

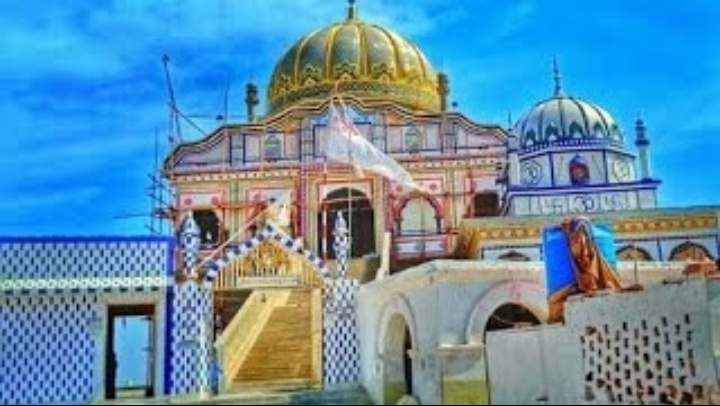
Pir Pithoro Sahib shrine in Umerkot

Pir Pithoro is a saint venerated in the Sindh region of Pakistan. Despite being a saint of Muslim origin, he is venerated predominantly by the Hindus and far less by Muslims. He has been called the pir of Menghwars community.

The main temple dedicated to Pithoro Pir is the Pir Pithoro Sahib in Pithoro town in Umerkot District. The annual mela at Pithora Sahib is mentioned as one of the largest one in the Thar region in 19th century records.

== Legend ==
=== Birth ===
In most of the versions of the tale the sgory goes like- When the Sufi saint Bahauddin Zakariyya was traveling through Sindh, he was approached by a man named Madan and asked for his blessing to have a child. The saint gave him pithu, a small piece of a dried date. It was consumed by his wife and she conceived immediately. Their son was born and was named Pithoro, after the pithu. Later he became a devoted follower of the saint.

In some versions of the story the Bahauddin Zakariyya is replaced by Shah Rukn-e Alam, who was the grandson and successor of Bahauddin Zakariyya.

=== Legend of Hamir and Pithoro ===
The Umarkot region, where the Pir lived, was marked by ongoing rivalries between two Rajput clans—the Somras and the Sodhas. In 1439, the Sodha chief Hamir defeated the Somras, establishing his dominance. By then, Pithoro Pir had already earned a reputation as a revered spiritual leader with many followers. However, Hamir grew wary, suspecting that the saint might threaten his authority. Determined to confront him, he marched with his army. As the legend goes, a miraculous event altered the course of events, leading Hamir to surrender, ask for forgiveness, and ultimately honor Pithoro Pir.

=== Protector of Meghwars ===
According to the tradition, he defended the Meghwars by defeating a Hindu Rajput King.

== Identity ==
The Rajput guardians of the Pithoro Pir Sahib recognize that Pithoro Pir as Muslim Sufi initiated by Bahauddin Zakariyya of Sohrawardiyya Sufi order. His identity as a Muslim saint is supported by the researchers and by the Hindu community including the gaddi nashin of the shrine.

The pir belonged to the Meghwar community which is supported by earlier records. Hathesingh asserts that he is of Rajput (Sodha) origin. The later view is not supported as the Sodhas, a well-known Rajput community in Sindh, are described in the Gazetteer of 1907 as Shiva worshippers, with no prior documented association with Pithoro Pir.

The Pithorpir Potas are Rajputs who claimed to be descendants of Pir Pithoro. However it is factually wrong and not supported by researchers. They claim to be descended from the brother of Pir Pithoro named Bhanwarji.

== Iconography and worship ==
The Iconography of the Pithoro Pir is similar to Ramdeo Pir or Darya Pir (Jhulelal) as saviors of Hindus. His is worshipped predominantly by the Meghwars Hindu community.

He is portrayed as a medieval warrior, a depiction that may draw either from the ideal of a ghazi (Islamic warrior) or from Rajput martial imagery. He is accompanied by two figures: the first, called Megha in the Kutch tradition, likely alludes to the Meghwar community; the second, Brahman Shri Djivan Joshi, remains unidentified. The background often varies, reflecting regional interpretations. This imagery differs from that of Ramdeo Pir and Udero Lal, who are typically shown surrounded by numerous disciples. The temple at Bhuj is largely defined by its shikhara (spire), suggesting a claim to Hindu identity, whereas the shrine of Pithoro Pir shows little reference to normative Hindu tradition. Recently, an ashram dedicated to Virnath has been added at Pithoro. This figure may be connected to the Nath tradition, and the presence of a trident there clearly points to a Shaivite association.

== See Also ==
- Ramdev Pir
