= Kingdom of Amarkot =

Kingdom in Sindh, Pakistan, 1226 to 1947

- 1226 - 1947
- Flag
- Motto: अखीतण अमराण गढ़ सोढाण (Devanagari script) اَکھیٹڻ اَمَراڻ گَڙھ سوڍاڻ (Perso-Arabic script Sindhi/ dhakti) Akhīṭaṇ Amarāṇ Gaṛh Soḍhāṇ (Roman transliterationwith diacritics)
- Capital: Amarkot
- Other languages: Thari; Sindhi; Gujarati; Sanskrit (religious language)
- Religion: Hinduism, Islam
- Historical era: Late Medieval Period
  - Established: 1226 AD
  - Acceded to Pakistan: 1947

The Sodhas of Amarkot were a Rajput dynasty who ruled Amarkot, which is now located in the Sindh province of Pakistan. The Sodha Rajput clan is a branch of the Parmar clan of Rajputs, who once ruled the region of Malwa and later the northwestern parts of Rajasthan. The kingdom was known for giving refuge to the Mughal emperor Humayun when he was fleeing from the forces of Sher Shah Suri; as a result, Akbar was born in the kingdom of Amarkot.

== Origins ==
The area around Suratgarh was called 'Sodhawati' and south-east of Bhatner was once occupied by the Sodha Rajputs before being evicted from these regions by Bhati Rajputs, after which they moved their base to Thar Desert.

== Major Jagirs and Princely States of Dhaat ==
The following is a list of the principal territories traditionally associated with the Sodha Rajputs of Amarkot (Dhaat), including their branch origins and territorial areas.

=== Princely States ===
- Amarkot: Branch origin: Surtan; Area: 31,910 km².
- Nagarparkar: Branch origin: Akha; Area: 4,190 km² (additional seat associated with the Amarkot Sodhas , semi independent).

=== Main Jagirs and Parganas ===
- Diplo: Branch origin: Maldev; Area: 3,892 km².
- Mithi: Branch origin: Naba; Area: 4,045 km².
- Chachro: Branch origin: Bhojraj; Area: 7,239 km².
- Pithoro: Branch origin: Not specified; Area: 1,248 km².

== History ==
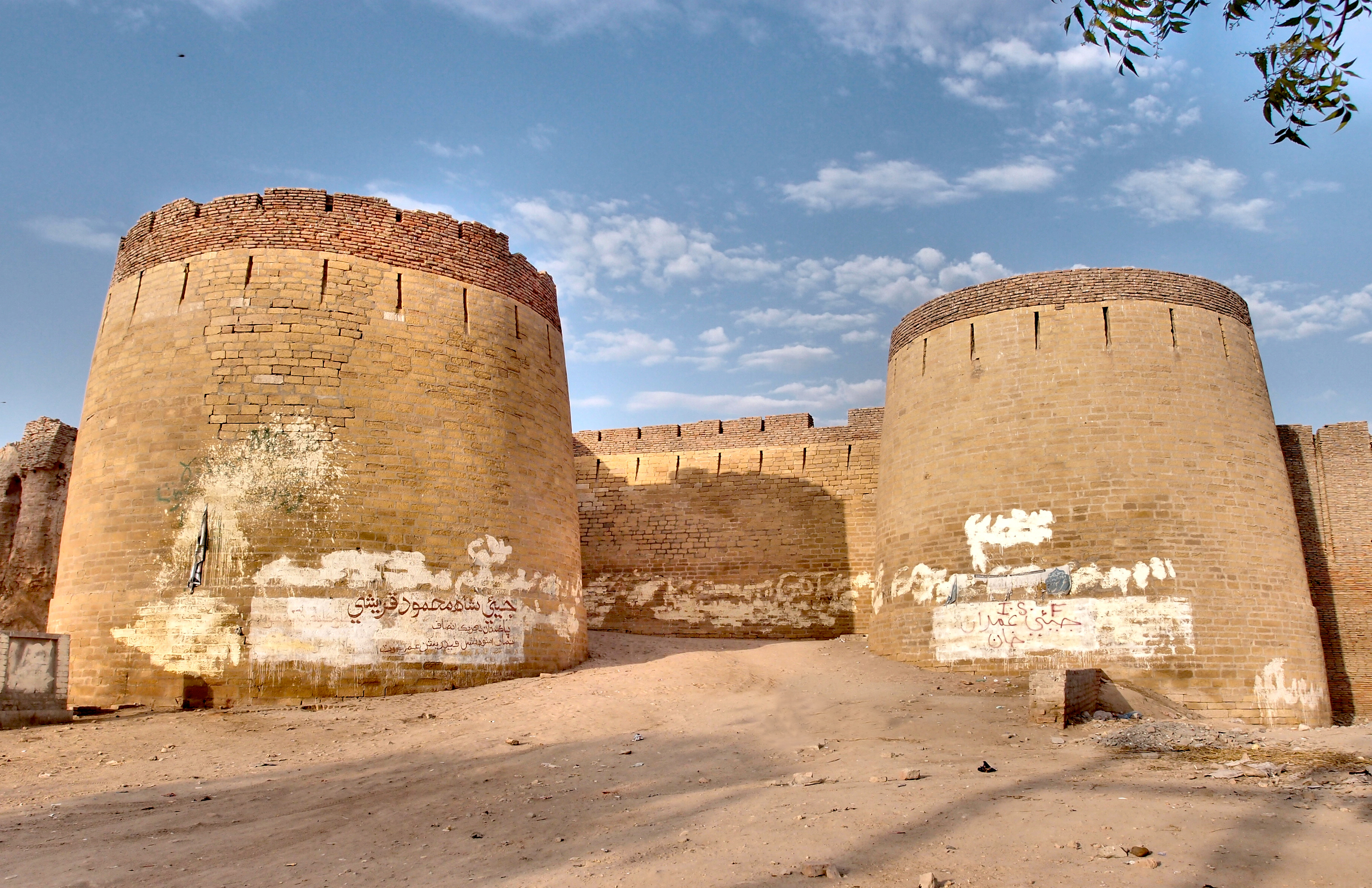
Amarkot Fort of Sodha Rajputs

A branch of Parmaras left Abu and settled in Radhanpur led by Bahar Parmar. His descendant Rao Sodho G became the founder of Sodha clan of Rajputs and captured Ratokot in 1125 AD. With base at Ratokot, they consolidated neighbouring villages under their influence. Further, Sodhoji's ambitious descendant Rana Raj Dev began plotting for the Amarkot fort held by the Soomras. For this purpose, he sent his trusted Charan allies Junfahji and Budhimanji to Amarkot to prepare the ground for the invasion, where they lived for some time before returning to Ratokot. After deliberations with both the Charanas, Rana Raj Dev launched his invasion of Amarkot (Umarkot) in 1226 AD. In the ensuing battle between the armies of Khenhro Soomro and Rana Raj Dev, Sodhas were victorious while Soomras had to retreat. Thus, Rana Raj Dev established Sodha rule over Amarkot and is considered the real founder of the Sodha dynasty. Thereafter, with Umarkot under control, the Sodhas began expansion of their kingdom and soon captured parts of Mithi, Chelhar, Chacharo, and extended their sway up to Nagarparkar. Four generations later, Rana Darabursh divided his state between his two sons and gave Amarkot and adjoining areas to his elder son Darjanshal and Nagarparkar to the younger son, Aasrai.

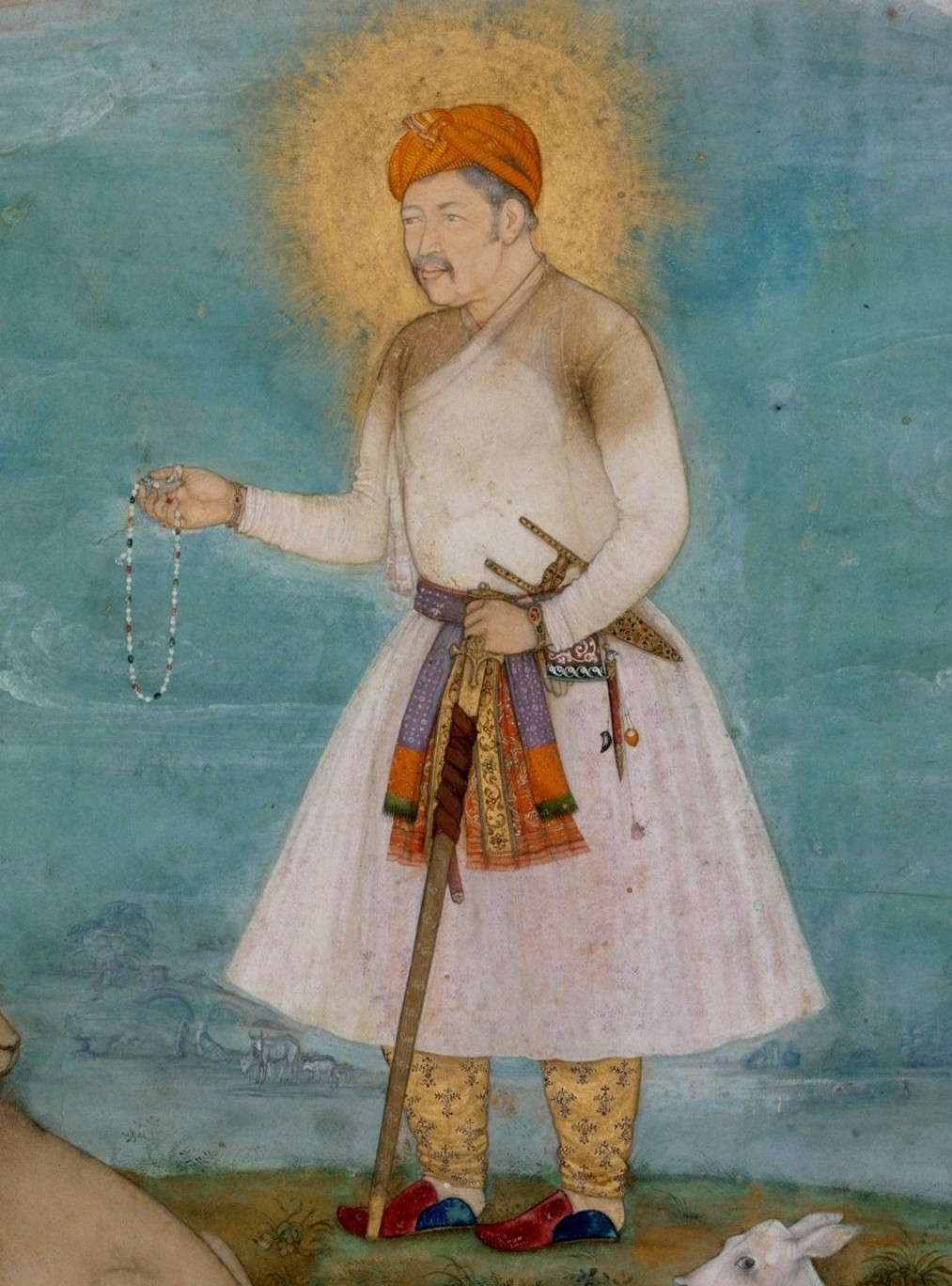
Akbar, the third Mughal Emperor was born in Amarkot.

=== Mughal Significance ===
The city of Amarkot held prominence during the Mughal Empire Akbar and the British Raj. Mughal Emperor Akbar was born in Amarkot 14 October 1542 when his father Humayun fled from the military defeat at the hands of Sher Shah Suri. Rana Parshad, the Sodha Rajput ruler of Amarkot, gave him refuge. Rana Prasad Rao of Amarkot duly welcomed Humayun into his home and sheltered the refugees for several months. Here, in the household of a Hindu Rajput nobleman, Humayun's wife Hamida Bano, daughter of a Sindhi family, gave birth to the future Emperor Akbar on 15 October 1542. The date of birth is well established because Humayun consulted his astronomer to utilise the astrolabe and check the location of the planets. The infant was the long-awaited heir-apparent to the 34-year-old Humayun and the answer of many prayers. Shortly after the birth, Humayun and his party left Amarkot for Sindh, leaving Akbar behind, who was not ready for the grueling journey ahead in his infancy.

=== Annexation by Marwar and British rule ===
The Amarkot Kingdom ruled by Sodha Rajputs was annexed by Jodhpur State in the 18th century, which caused the decay of power as the Sodha rulers became vassals to retain independence from Jodhpur but it never happened they even tried to seek help from Marathas (Mahadji Shinde) in return they promised to help them against Timur shah Durrani if he invaded. The Amarkot area and its fort was later handed to the British in 1847 by the Maharaja of Jodhpur in return for reducing the tribute imposed on Jodhpur State by Rs.10,000 and the territory came under direct rule of British India, and the Ranas were reduced to category of Jagirdars. The British annexed Amarkot to Tharparkar district and made it a part of the Sind division of Bombay Presidency

=== End of Reign ===
The Sodha rule came to an end in 1947 Partition of British India, after the Amarkot king Rana Arjun Singh contested for the All-India Muslim League platform, and decided to join the new nation of Pakistan.

== Descendants ==
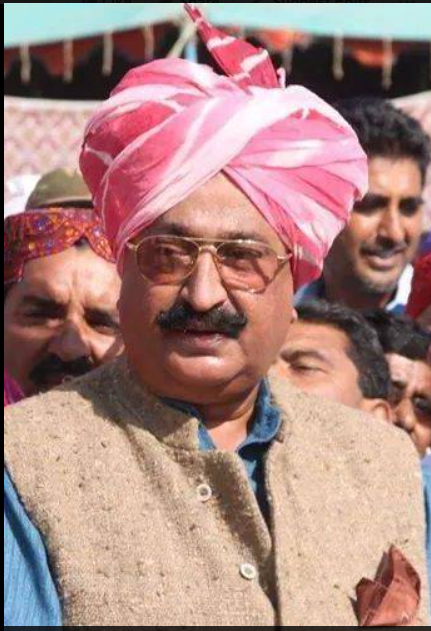
Rana Hamir Singh, the 26th Rana and a prominent Pakistani politician.

Rana Chandra Singh, a federal minister and the chieftain of the Hindu Sodha Rajput clan and the Amarkot Jagir, was one of the founder members of Pakistan Peoples Party (PPP) and was elected to the National Assembly of Pakistan from Umarkot, seven times with PPP between 1977 and 1999, when he founded the Pakistan Hindu Party (PHP).

Chandra Singh's son Rana Hamir Singh is the 26th Rana of Tharparkar, Amarkot and Mithi.
