= Sodha =

Rajput clan in Pakistan and India

Sodha House of Amarkot
- Flag of Kingdom of Amarkot
- Parent house: Parmara Rajputs
- Country: Kingdom of Amarkot
- Founded: 1125; 901 years ago
- Founder: Rao Sodho
- Current head: Rana Hamir Singh
- Final ruler: Rana Arjun Singh
- Titles: Rana of Amarkot

Sodha (Sindhi: سوڍا) is a Rajput clan residing in India and Pakistan. They are an off-shoot of the Parmar Rajputs and claims Agnivanshi descent.

== History ==
They are an off-shoot of Parmara Rajputs, who once controlled regions of Malwa and later northwestern parts of Rajasthan. The area around Suratgarh was called 'Sodhawati' and south-east of Bhatner was once occupied by the Sodha Rajputs before being evicted from these regions by Bhati Rajputs, after which they moved their base to Thar Desert. Sodha Rajputs, based in Umerkot district of Pakistan's Sindh, are one of the clans, which are off-shoots of the Parmar Rajput dynasty that reigned over Malwa in central India from the 9th to the 13th century. The Sodhas controlled Tharparak (Thar) in the southeast of the Sindh province in Pakistan.

Sodha Rajputs are one of the few Hindu Rajput clans still living in Pakistan. The history of Sodha Rajputs is also recorded in book named "Sodhayan" authored by Chimanji Kavia in early 20th century and published in 1887 at Jodhpur.

=== Amarkot kingdom ===
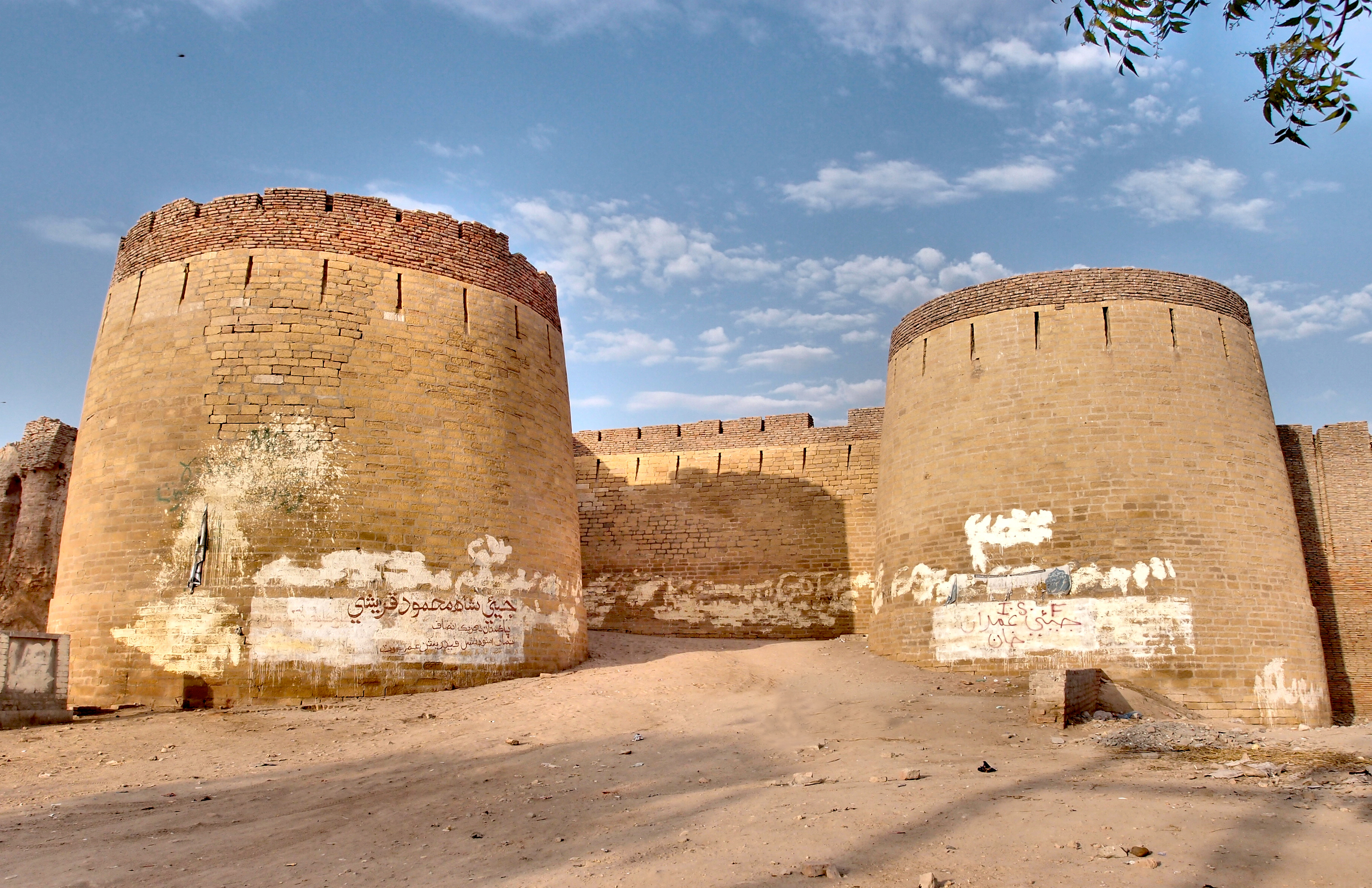
Amarkot Fort of Sodha Rajput

A branch of Parmaras left Abu and settled in Radhanpur led by Bahar Parmar. His descendant Rao Sodho G became the founder of Sodha clan of Rajputs and captured Ratokot in 1125 AD. With base at Ratokot, they consolidated neighbouring villages under their influence.

Further, Sodhoji's ambitious descendant Rana Raj Dev began plotting for the Amarkot fort held by the Soomras. For this purpose, he sent his trusted Charan allies Junfahji and Budhimanji to Amarkot to prepare the ground for the invasion, where they lived for some time before returning to Ratokot.

After deliberations with both the Charanas, Rana Raj Dev launched his invasion of Amarkot (Umarkot) in 1226 AD. In the ensuing battle between the armies of Khenhro Soomro and Rana Raj Dev, Sodhas were victorious while Soomras had to retreat. Thus, Rana Raj Dev established Sodha rule over Amarkot and is considered the real founder of the Sodha dynasty.

Thereafter, with Umarkot under control, the Sodhas began expansion of their kingdom and soon captured parts of Mithi, Chelhar, Chacharo, and extended their sway up to Nagarparkar. Four generations later, Rana Darabursh divided his state between his two sons and gave Amarkot and adjoining areas to his elder son Darjanshal and Nagarparkar to the younger son, Aasrai.

Amarkot province was ruled by Sodha Rajput clan from medieval times until 1947 Partition of British India. The city held prominence during the Mughal Empire Jalaluddin Mohammed Akbar and the British Raj. Mughal Emperor Akbar The Great was born in Amarkot 14 October 1542 when his father Humayun fled from the military defeat at the hands of Sher Shah Suri. Rana Parshad, the Sodha Rajput ruler of Amarkot, gave him refuge. Anarkot Kingdom ruled by Sodha Rajputs was annexed by Jodhpur State in the 18th century and its rulers were reduced to Vassals. Amarkot area and its fort was later handed to the British in 1847 by the Maharaja of Jodhpur in return for reducing the tribute imposed on Jodhpur State by Rs.10,000. and the territory came under direct rule of British India, and the Ranas were reduced to category of Jagirdars.

== Pakistan ==
Amarkot was the only area with a Hindu majority population of Sodha Rajputs and including the ruling family that acceded to Pakistan. Rana Chandra Singh, a federal minister and the chieftain of the Hindu Sodha Rajput clan and the Amarkot Jagir, was one of the founder members of Pakistan Peoples Party (PPP) and was elected to the National Assembly of Pakistan from Umarkot, seven times with PPP between 1977 and 1999, when he founded the Pakistan Hindu Party (PHP). Many Muslim Sodhas are also found across Pakistan's Sindh province and Indian state of Rajasthan. Currently, his politician son Rana Hamir Singh is the 26th Rana of Tharparkar, Amarkot and Mithi.

They still follow the age-old tradition of getting their daughters married to Rajput families in the border districts of India's Rajasthan. As they only inter-marry with other Hindu Rajput clans, every year they come to Rajasthan, to choose their bride and groom. Both Government of India and Pakistan have made special visa provisions and created a special diplomatic channel to facilitate the cross-country marriage of Sodha Rajputs, despite the strained relations between both countries.

== India ==
In India, Sodha Rajputs are found scattered around North West regions of Rajasthan.

In Kachchh district of Gujarat, Sodha Rajputs are the most recent migrants from Sindh, Pakistan. After Chachro Raid during Indo-Pakistan War of 1971, the Sodhas had flee Sindh and were settled in Rapar and Bacchau tehsils of Kachchh where they continue to live.

Sodhas are one of several sub-groups of the larger Hindu Rajput community and retain strong links with Sindh through intermarriages. Fiercely patriarchal customs and traditions characterize this traditional protector-warrior community. Control over the movement of women in public has led to various ironic role reversals, such as men fetching water for the women from the village well.
