= Pithoro =

Tehsil in Umerkot District, Sindh, Pakistan

Coordinates: 25°30′17″N 69°23′16″E

Pithoro Tehsil Sindhi: تعلقو پٿورو Pithoro Taluka
- Tehsil of Umerkot District
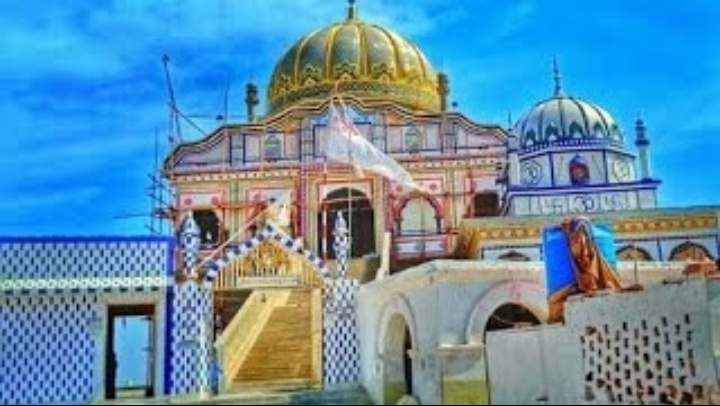
- Pir Pithoro Sahib shrine

- Location within Sindh Location within Pakistan
- Country: Pakistan
- Province: Sindh
- District: Umerkot District
- Tehsil: Tehsil

Population (2023)
  - Total: 130,383
- Time zone: UTC+5 (PST)

Pithoro Tehsil (also known as Pithoro Taluka) is an administrative subdivision (tehsil) of Umerkot District in the province of Sindh, Pakistan. It is one of the most affected regions during monsoon and floods.

The tehsil is named after Pir Pithoro. According to the 2023 national census, Pithoro Tehsil had a population of 130,383.

== Demographics ==
The literacy rate is estimated to be around 40%.

=== Religion ===
Religions in Pithoro Tehsil (2023)
Religion	Percent
Islam	50.85%
Hinduism	48.48%
Other or not stated	0.67%

Islam is the religion of the majority of the tehsil's population. Hinduism is practised by a significant minority.

=== Language ===
Sindhi is the mother tongue of the large majority of residents, spoken by approximately 97% of the population. Other languages represented include Urdu, Punjabi, and Balochi.

== See also ==
- Umerkot District
- Kunri Tehsil
