= Rahmore =

Rahmore Sindhi: راهمور
- Village

Rahmore, previously named as Pir Bachal Shah, Deh Kharo Kunn, is a village in Kunri Taluka, Umarkot District, Sindh, Pakistan. It is located eastern side of Nabisar Road. It is a densely populated village with majority of people relating to caste Meghwar, Syed, Saan and Kunbhar.
