= Rana Prashad Rao =

16th century ruler of Amarkot, Sindh

Rana Prashad Rao of Umerkot, was the eighteenth ruler of the Sodha kingdom which ruled from (1530-1556). He is known for giving refuge to the Mughal king Humayun at the glorious city of Umerkot, now located in Pakistan.

== History ==
King Prashad Rao, therefore welcomed Humayun and his wife Hamida Bano. Humayun sought refuge to the Rajput palace of Umerkot. The Mughal king and Sher Shah had fight and the Mughal king got to exile in cowardice due to his loss.

== Personal life ==
Prashad Rao was born to Ganga Sodha. He was named from Veer Sal 'the one who makes enemies remember ages'. He had a son named after Moon god as Chandrasen Singh Sodhaa.

== In popular culture ==
It is sometimes debated between historians that between exile of Humayun. The mughal king left his wife, Hamida to Rana Prashad's palace and he ran to Afghanistan. Rana Prashad and Hamida were there for 14 months and they had son named Akbar. After the returning of Humayun, Humayun thought that Akbar was his son and took him and made him the king of Mughal kingdom. This can be said to be exaggerated or propaganda narrative fabricated by some Hindutva nationalists to show authority over Muslims as a result to Reverse love jihad.

It is said that when Akbar become the king of Delhi, he banned revenue taxes in the areas of Tharparkar and Amarkot. The famous poet of Sindh Shah Abdul Latif Bhittai has said in his Sindhi poetry in Shah Jo Risalo "Nika Jhal nika jad nika raher deh mein" means that in kingdom of Rana there is no revenue or governmental tax, everybody lives prosperous life.

== See also ==
- Rana Hamir Singh
- Rana Chandra Singh
- Rana Ratan Singh
- Kertee
- Amarkot
