= Walhet Muhammad Essa Mangrio =

Walhet Muhammad Essa Mangrio (Sindhi: ولھيٽ محمد عيسيٰ منڱريو /Urdu: ولھیٹ محمد عیسیٰ منگریو) is a village of Sindh, Pakistan. It is located about 13km away from the city of Umerkot and 64km away from Mirpur Khas.
