= Rana Ratan Singh =

Rana Ratan Singh was a hereditary land owner in Umerkot, belonging to Sodha sub clan of Rajputs. Rana killed the British appointed Governor of Umarkot Fort, Syed Mohammad Ali, in 1847, during a tax protest. He was soon after tried and convicted of committing murder and treason, and hanged in Umarkot Fort, by the British.
