= Rana (title) =

Indian honorary title

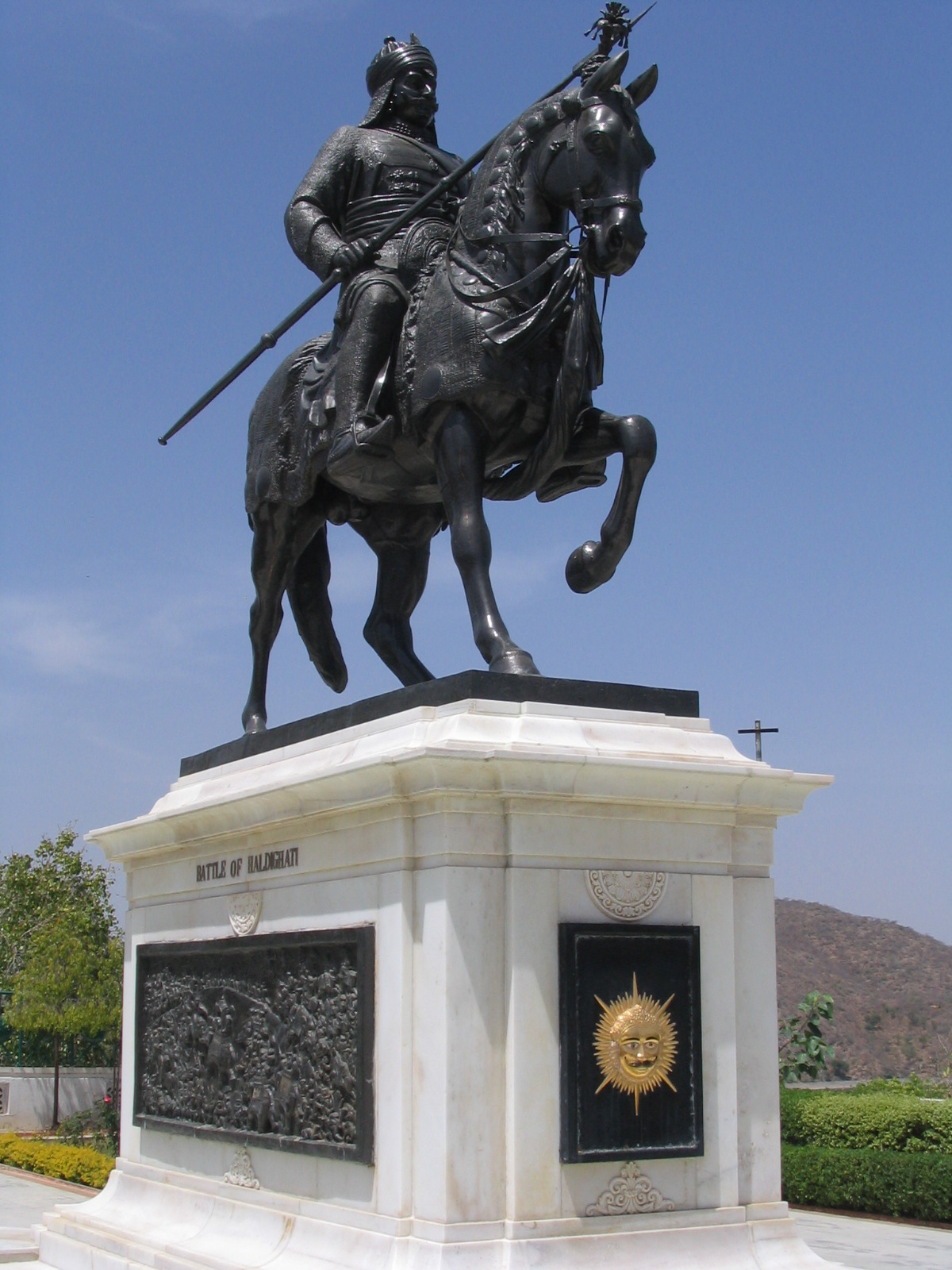
A statue of Maharana Pratap, a Sisodia Rajput ruler of the 16th century.

Rana (IAST: Rāṇā, राणा) is a historical royal title from the Indian subcontinent, where it is today used as a hereditary name. "Rana" was formerly used as a title of martial sovereignty by Rajput kings in India. The term derives from the Sanskrit title "rāṇaka".

Rani is the title for the wife of a rana or a female monarch. It also applies to the wife of a raja. Compound titles include rana sahib, ranaji, raj rana, rana bahadur, and maharana.

== Usage in the Indian subcontinent ==
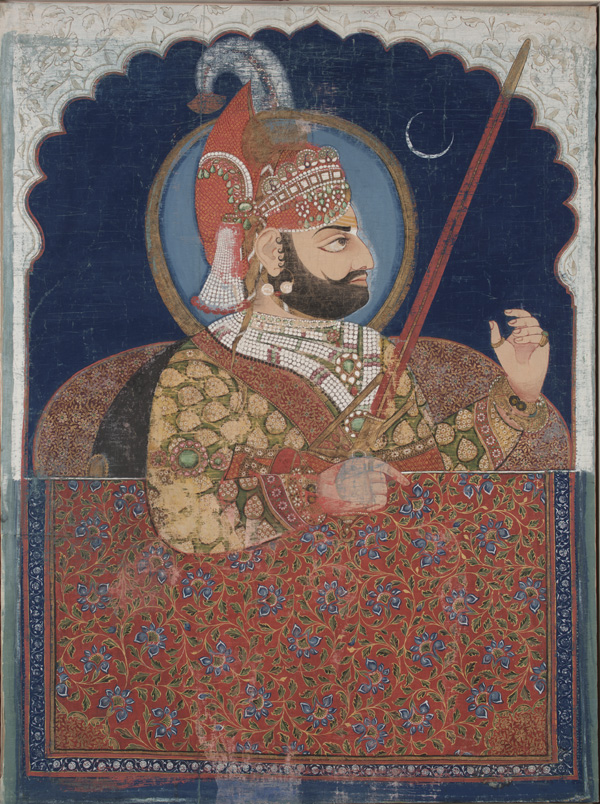
Bhim Singh, the Rana of Udaipur

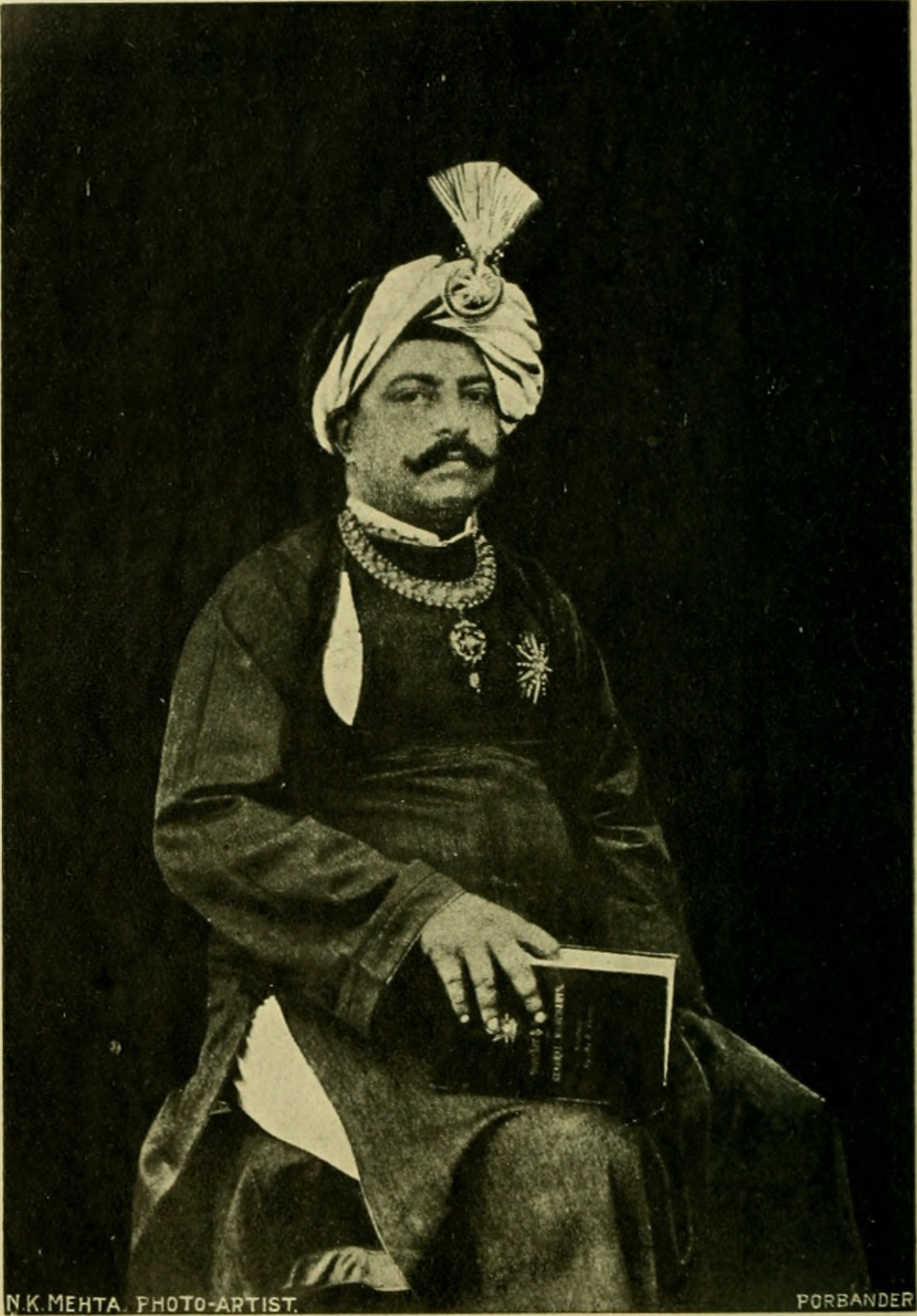
Rana Bhavsinhji of Porbandar State. The Jethwa rulers of Porbandar used the title Rana as well.

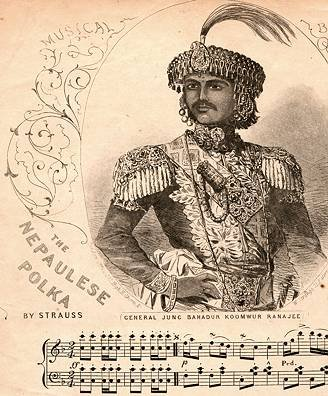
Jung Bahadur Rana at London in 1850.

As a title, Rana is used by different Rajput clans across India, Pakistan and Nepal. In India and Nepal, they are predominantly Hindus.

"Rana" was formerly used as a title of martial sovereignty by Rajput kings in India. Sisodia rulers of Mewar used the title of Mahārāṇā (महाराणा) extensively in their royal charters. Today, members of some Rajput clans in Indian subcontinent use it as a hereditary title. In Pakistan, mostly Muslims —but also some Hindus in Sindh— use it as a hereditary title. Amarkot, a state in Sindh, has a Hindu Sodha Rajput ruler who uses the title. In the 16th century, Rana Prasad, the monarch of Amarkot, gave refuge to the Mughal prince Humayun and his wife, Hamida Banu Begum, who had fled from military defeat at the hands of Sher Shah Suri. Their son Akbar was born in the fort of the Rana of Amarkot.

The head of the Kunwar nobles of Nepal, Jung Bahadur Kunwar, took the title of Rana(ji) and Shree Teen Maharaja after consolidation of his post of Prime Minister of Nepal. The subsequent Rana dynasty controlled administration of the Kingdom of Nepal from 1846 until 1951, reducing the Shah monarch to a figurehead and making Prime Minister and other government positions hereditary. On 15 May 1848, a lal mohar (royal seal) was issued, issued claiming descent for the Kunwars, now self-styled Ranas, from the Ranas of Mewar and authorizing the Kunwar family of Jang Bahadur to style themselves as Kunwar Ranaji. Before this, the Kunwar family had merely been regarded as Khas-Chhetris, and had had no pretensions to any kind of royal Rajput origin.

== Sources ==
- Whelpton, John (1991). Kings, soldiers, and priests: Nepalese politics and the rise of Jang Bahadur Rana, 1830–1857. Manohar Publications. p. 254. ISBN 9788185425641.
