= Rana Chandra Singh =

Pakistani politician

Member National Assembly of Pakistan from Umerkot
- In office 1977–1999

Personal details
- Born: 1931 Rana Jagir, Umerkot, British India
- Died: 1 August 2009 (aged 78) Karachi, Pakistan
- Children: 4 sons and 1 daughter, including Rana Hamir Singh
- Occupation: Politician, agriculturalist
- Known for: Founder of Pakistan Hindu Party

Rana Chandra Singh (Sindhi: راڻو چندر سنگھ; 1931 – 1 August 2009), was a Pakistani politician and a federal minister. He was one of the founding members of the Pakistan Peoples Party (PPP) and was elected to the National Assembly of Pakistan from Umerkot seven times with PPP between 1977 and 1999. He founded the Pakistan Hindu Party (PHP) in 1990.

== Early life ==
Rana Chandra Singh was born in 1931 in Rana Jagir, 16 km from Umarkot, present-day Umerkot District. He belonged to the Hindu Sodha clan of Rajputs and was the Rana (chieftain) of the Amarkot (Umerkot) jagir, a Rajput estate in Pakistan.

== Career ==
He was a close friend of Zulfikar Ali Bhutto and Benazir Bhutto, and was a founding member of the Pakistan Peoples Party. He was also elected as MNA seven times, serving as Minister of Science and Technology, Revenue and Narcotics Affairs. In 1990, he left PPP and formed his political party, the Pakistan Hindu Party (PHP). He designed for his party a saffron flag bearing two ancient logos – Om and Trishool. He served as Minister for Agriculture and Revenue and was the Chairman of the National Commission of Minorities. He won elections as an Independent candidate for a continuous 53 years – a considerable achievement for a minority Hindu. He had joined PPP after parting ways with PML-Q.

He died on 1 August 2009 at the age of 78, after a prolonged illness, as he had suffered paralysis in 2004. Prime Minister Syed Yusuf Raza Gilani, in a message to his family, expressed grief over the death of former federal minister, while President Asif Ali Zardari described him as "one of the fearless political activists who joined the party in the early days of its formation by Shaheed Zulfiqar Ali Bhutto and who stood by him through thick and thin". His body was taken to his native village, Rana Jagir, 16 km from Umarkot, for cremation, where earlier, his elder son Rana Hamir Singh was installed as his successor, the 26th Rana of Tharparkar's Thakurs.

According to Waseem Altaf, a retired Pakistani bureaucrat, "whenever the Cabinet was given a defense-related briefing, Rana Chandra Singh was asked to leave the Cabinet Room."

== Personal life ==
He was married to Rani Sahiba Subhadra Kumari, daughter of Rawat Tej Singh of Rawatsar in Hanumangarh district of Rajasthan. They have four sons and one daughter.
