= Kunri Christian Hospital =

Hospital in Kunri, Sindh, Pakistan

Geography
- Location: Kunri, Sindh, Pakistan
- Coordinates: 25°10′30″N 69°34′16″E

Organisation
- Care system: Public
- Religious affiliation: Church of Pakistan

Links
- Lists: Hospitals in Pakistan

Kunri Christian Hospital (Urdu: کنری کرسچن ہسپتال), locally known as American Hospital, is a hospital in Kunri, Sindh.

== History ==
Kunri Christian Hospital originated from a facility established by the Roman Catholic Archdiocese of Karachi, which focused on women's healthcare. Due to staffing challenges, this hospital was closed in 1975. Simultaneously, the Christian Caravan Hospital (CCH), a mobile unit serving various locations in Sindh for fifteen years, was seeking a permanent location due to its deteriorating infrastructure. Consequently, the Catholic Diocese of Karachi leased the vacated hospital facility to the Protestant Church of Pakistan Diocese of Hyderabad, leading to the relocation of CCH to Kunri in the same year.

After being renamed as the Kunri Christian Hospital, it became a component of the Rural Health Care Project (RHCP), indicating a shift towards a broader community health focus. The hospital expanded its services, particularly in curative medicine, while maintaining initiatives in preventive care. Its areas of specialization included general medicine, surgery, gynecology, obstetrics, and ophthalmology, with the hospital organizing eye camps in the Thar Desert.

Over time, a reduction in international staff led to financial and staffing constraints, impacting patient intake. Some of the hospital's unused spaces were subsequently repurposed for a Christian school and a women's cottage industry. The original Christian Caravan Hospital, meanwhile, continued its operations in Rattanabad as a tuberculosis control center as of 2006.
