= Dundicut =

Dark red chili peppers grown in Sindh Pakistan

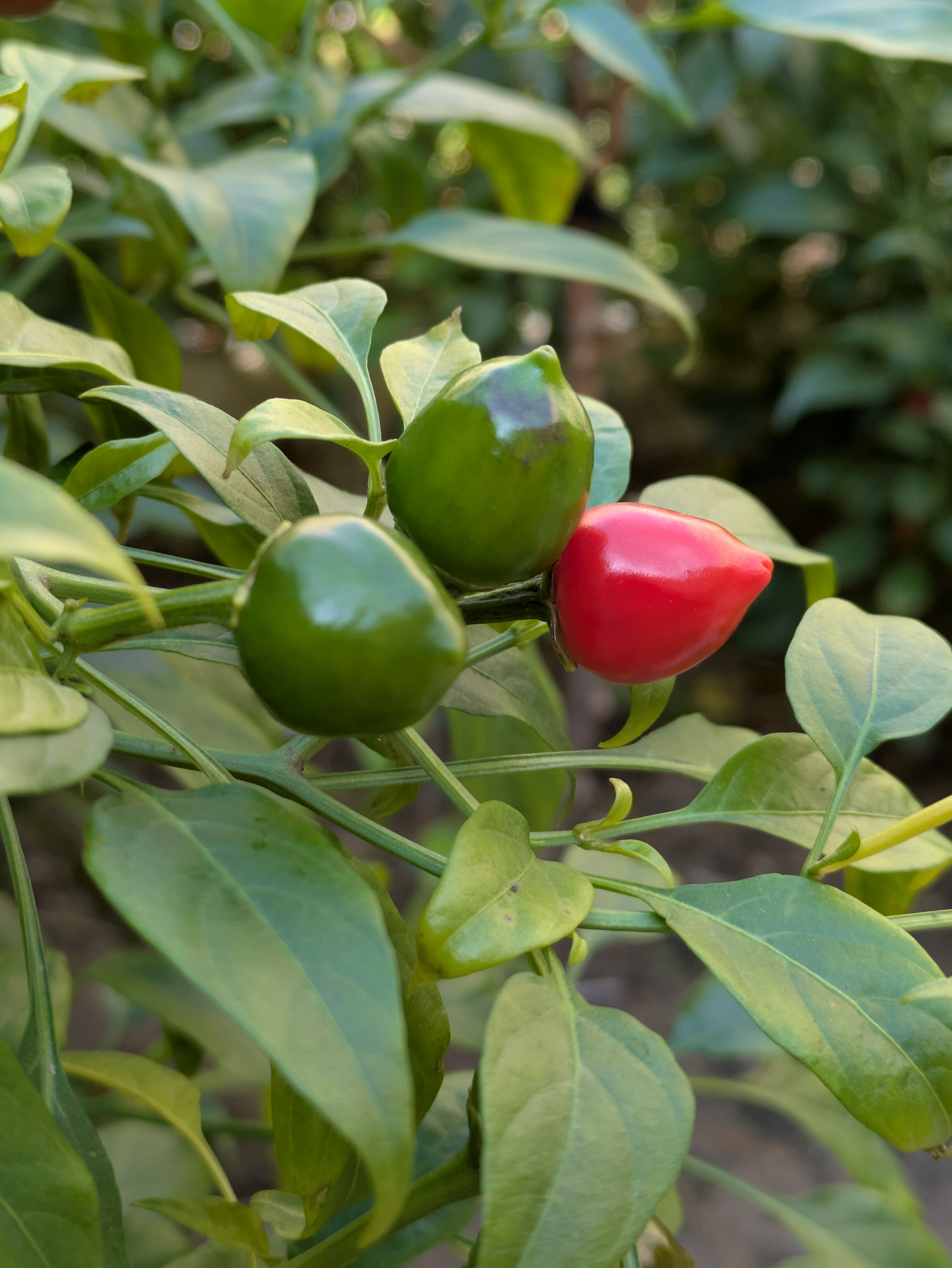
- Species: Capsicum annuum
- Origin: Pakistan
- Heat: Hot
- Scoville scale: 30,000-65,000 SHU

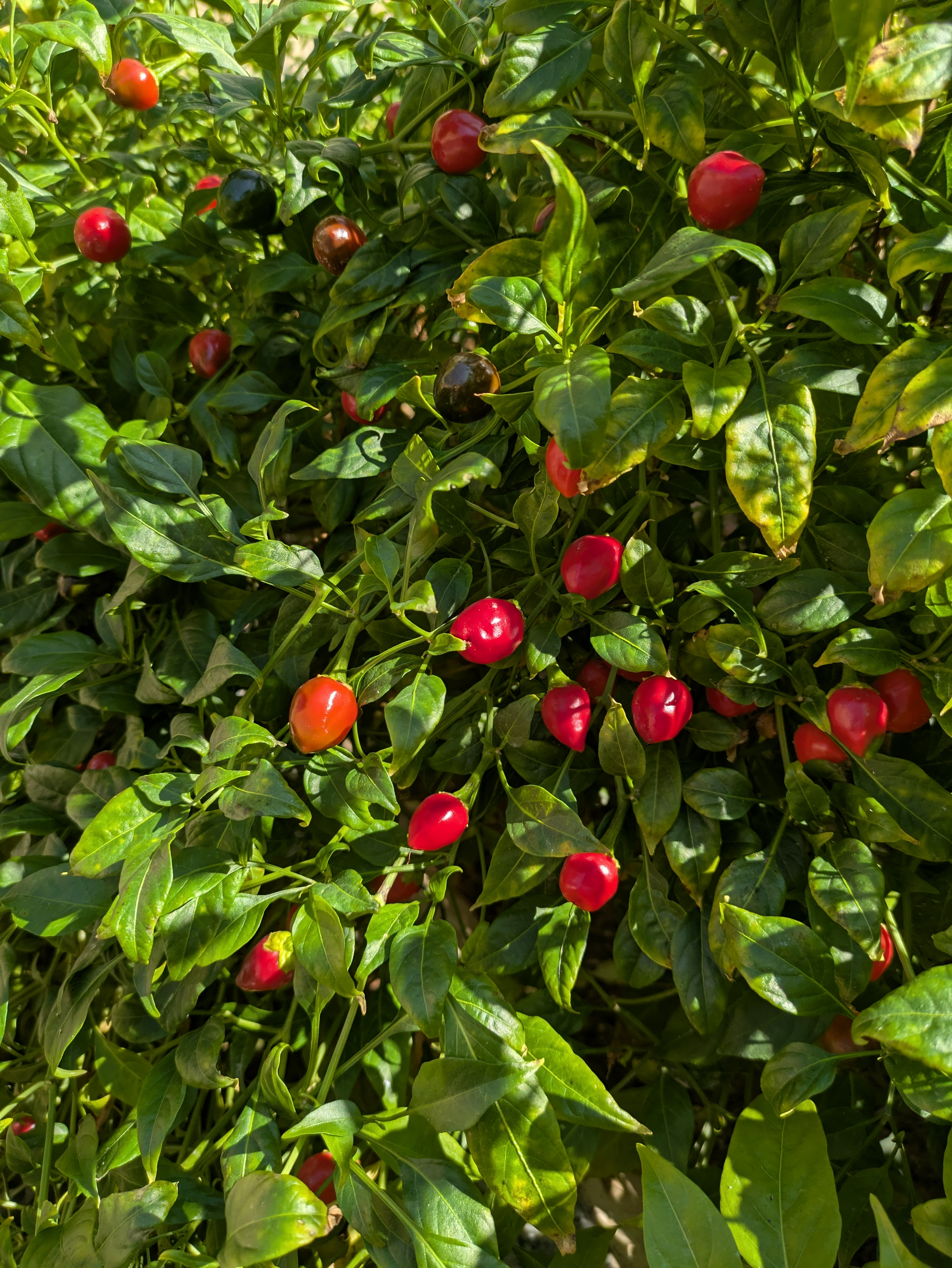
Dundicut Pepper in Behbahan, Iran

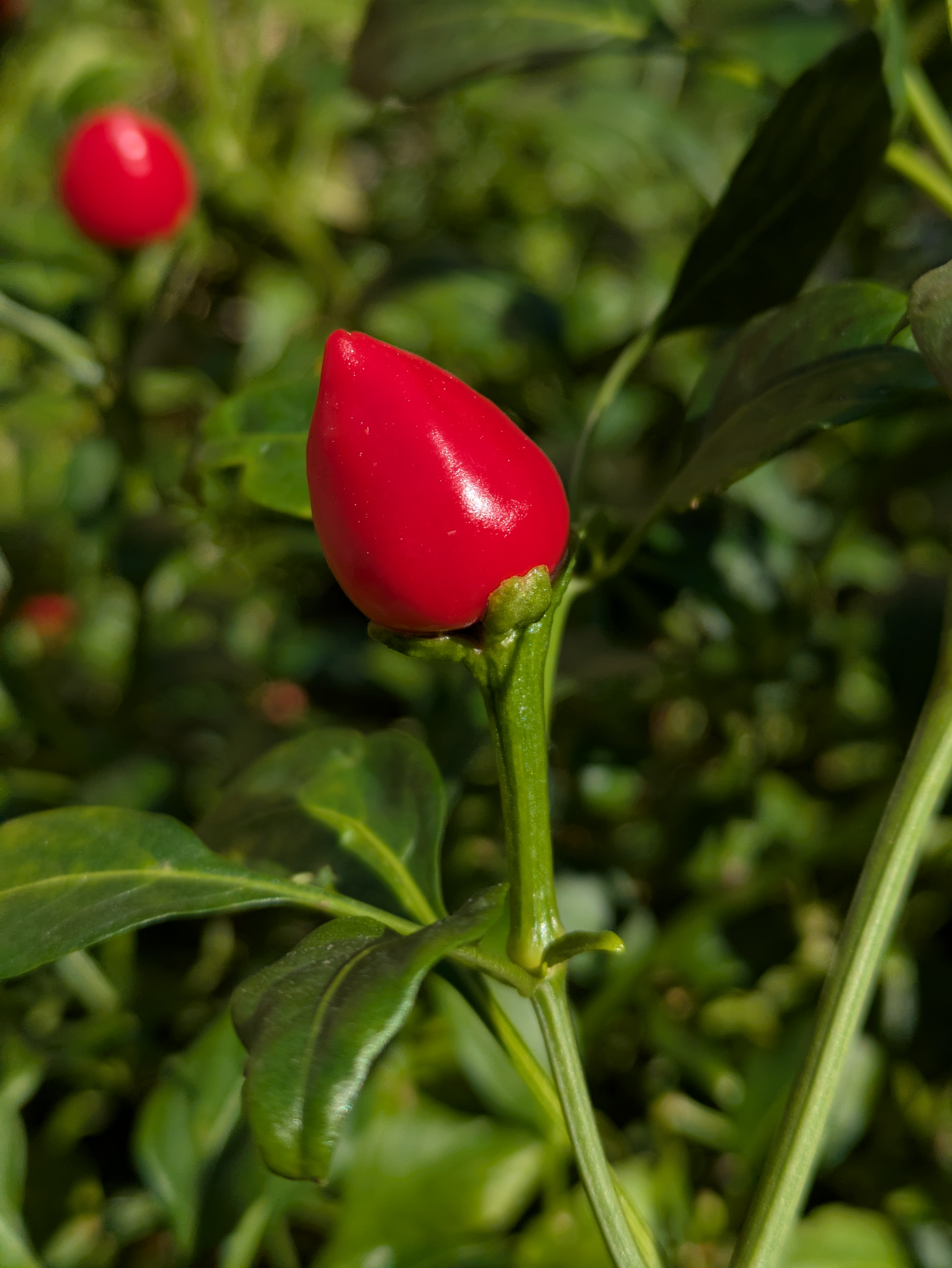
Dundicut Pepper in Behbahan, Iran

Dundicut peppers are a variety of small, round (approx. 1/2" to 1" diameter), dark red chili peppers grown in Sindh, in Pakistan, Sikkim in India and Ilam in Nepal. They are a cultivar of either Capsicum frutescens or Capsicum annuum and are also known in Asia as gol lal mirch. Sold dried, Dundicuts are similar in size and flavor to Scotch bonnet peppers, but are not as hot, and are of a different species.

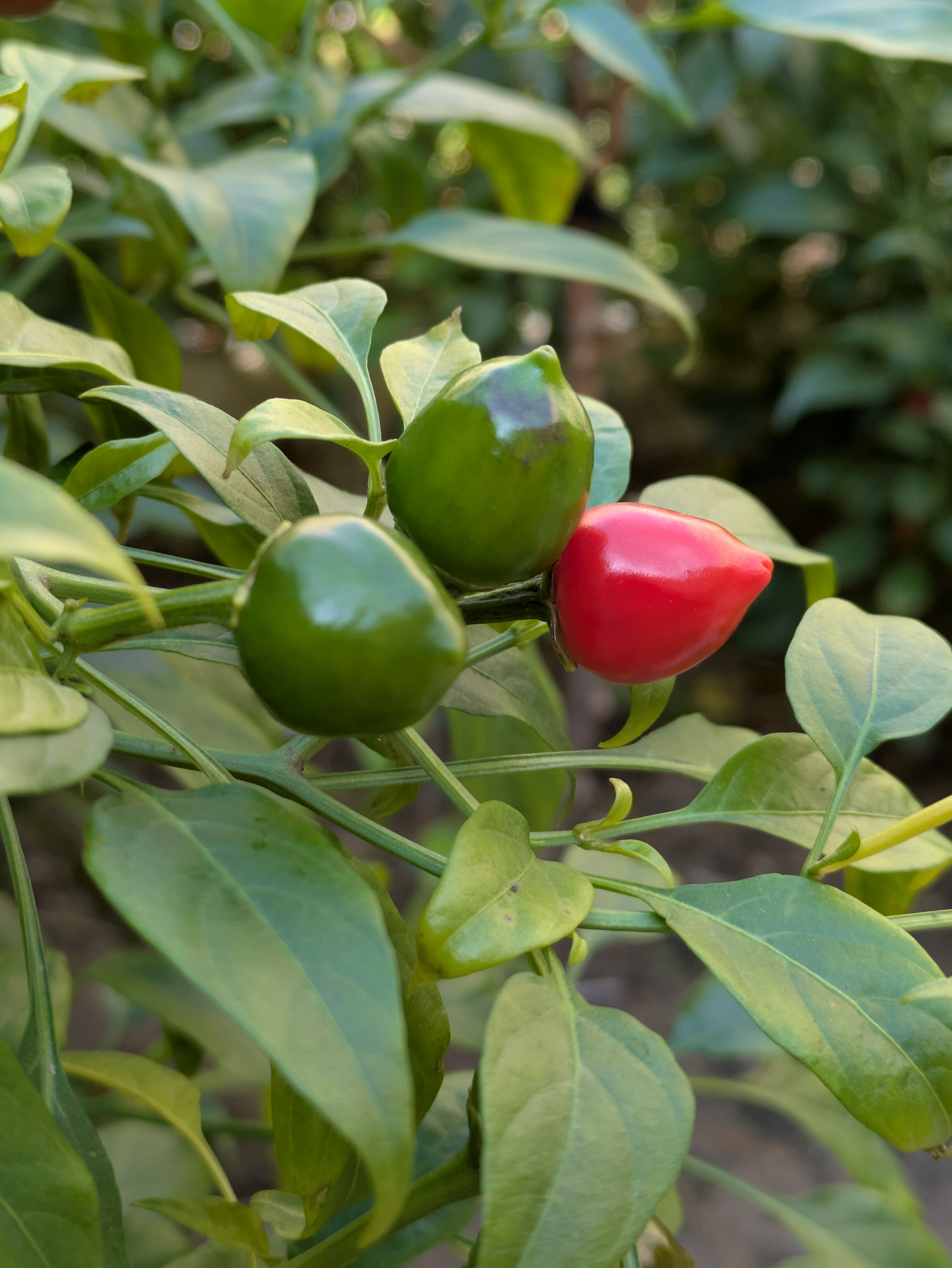
Dundicut Pepper in Behbahan, Iran

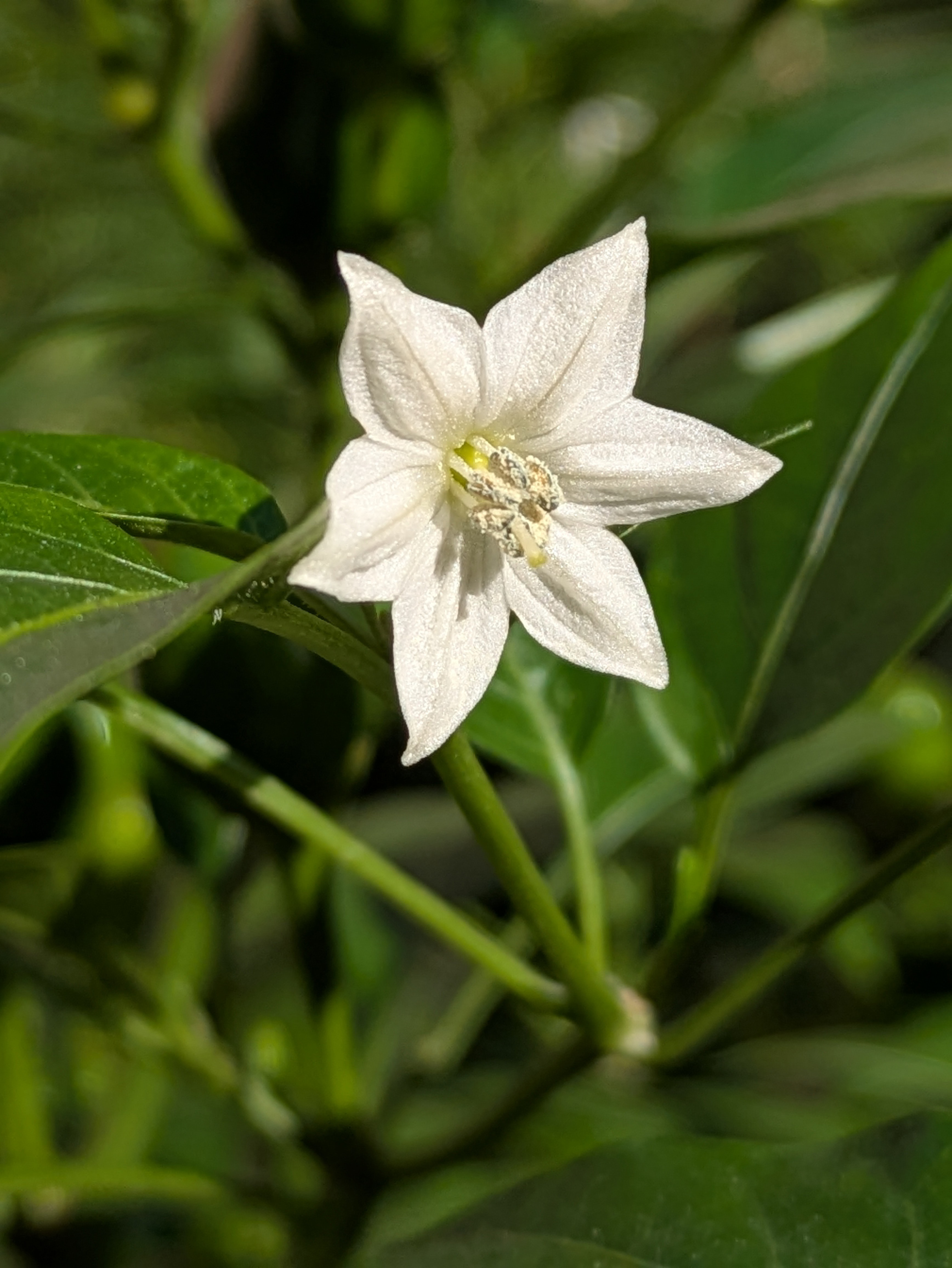
Dundicut Pepper Flower in Behbahan, Iran

According to a major U.S. commercial spice vendor, dundicuts are "quite hot, with a full-bodied, complex flavor. A single crushed pepper will add heat and flavor to a dish for two." The heat rating for Dundicuts, as measured in Scoville Units, ranges from as low as 30,000 to a high of 65,000.

Dundicuts are a common ingredient in parrot food.
