= Kertee =

Karli Nagar Kertigadh
- village
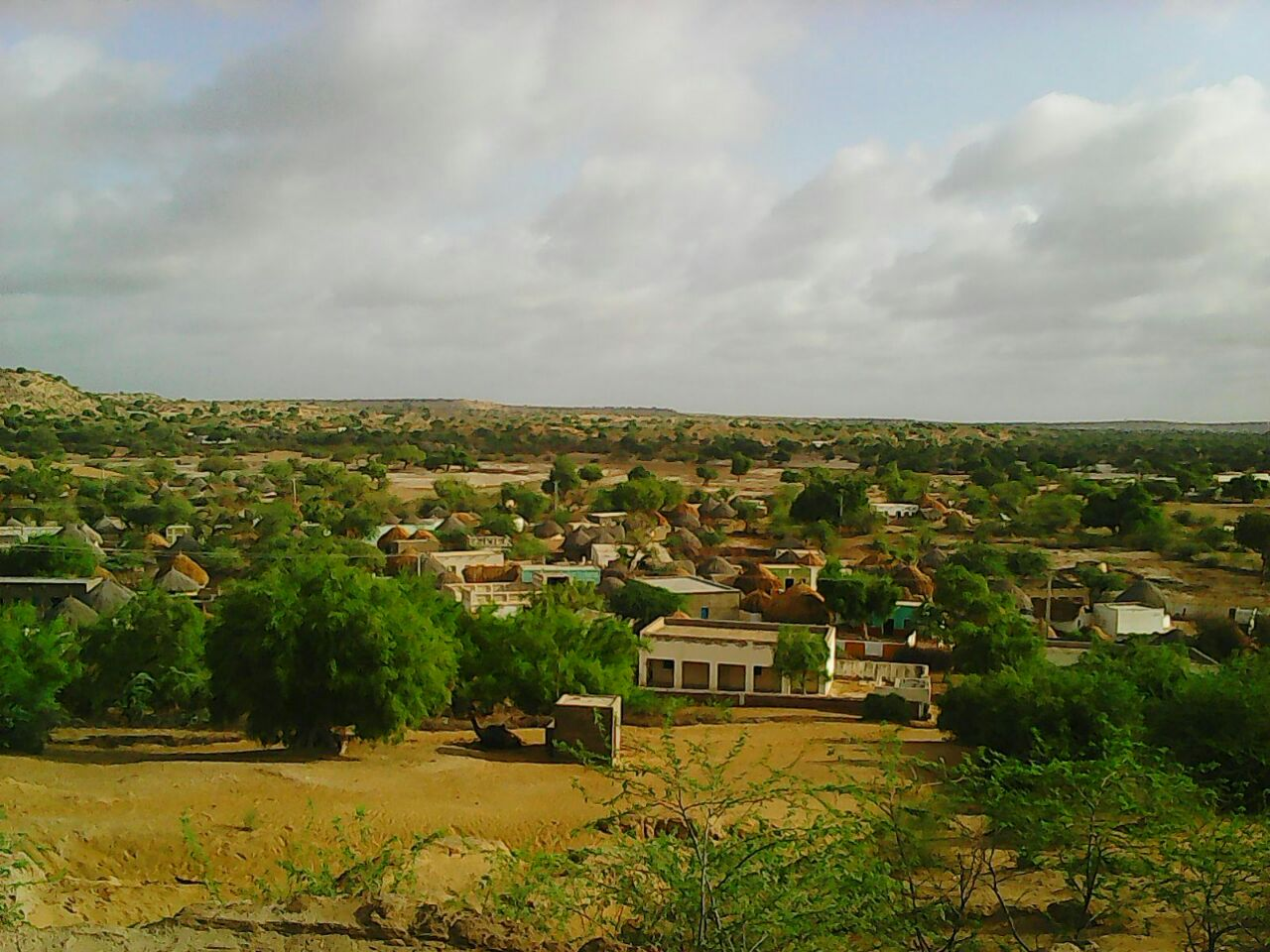
- Overview of village Kertee
- Interactive map of Karli Nagar
- Coordinates: 24°36′54.5″N 69°54′59.1″E
- Time zone: UTC+5.00 (PST)

Kertee, also known as Kertigarh, is a village in Tharparkar District, Sindh, Pakistan, located 21 km (13 mi) south of Mithi city. It was known as Karli Nagar in Gujarati language. Apart from its historical background, Kertee is also famous for an ancient well, said to be 5,000 years old. Stories mention that this well was constructed by the Pandavas during their exile of 14 years. There are also temples of some common Hindu deities like as Oghar Nath, Pir Pithora, Pir Bhavsingh, Mard Ali Shah, Mauji, Mataji, three temples of Shiva and one temple of Krishna.

== Geography ==
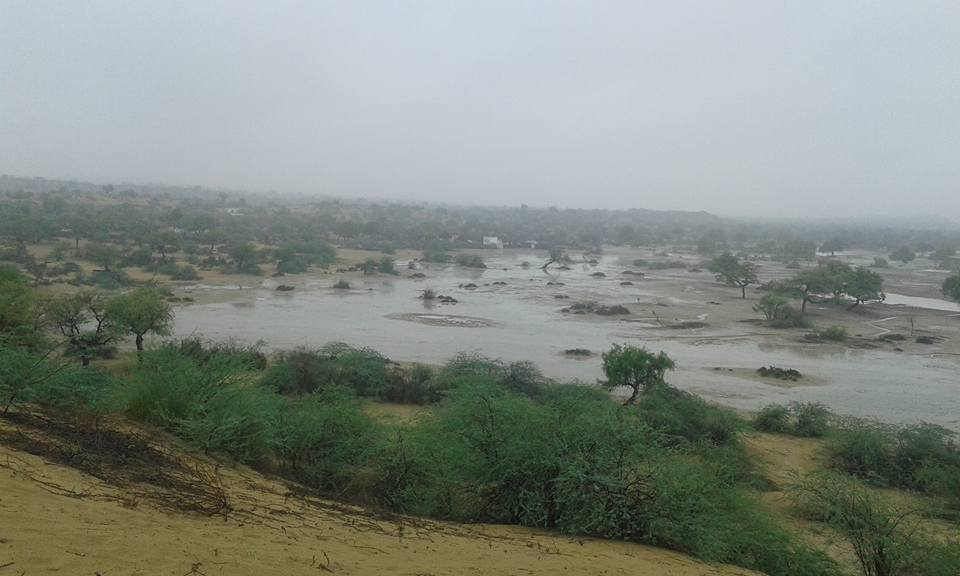
Kertee after rain.

Kertee is situated in Tharparkar district, 21 km (13 mi) south of Mithi. It some of the surrounding villages include Veeh and Choompni to the south, as well as Bhakuo and Veri.

== Education ==
Kertee has separate government primary and high schools for boys and girls, as well as Government Girls School Kertee for girls.

== Agriculture ==
The district in which Kertee is situated is susceptible to droughts, which adversely affect local farming.

== See also ==
- Sant Nenuram Ashram
