= Umerkot =

Umarkot: عمرکوٹ (Urdu); عمرڪوٽ (Dhatki); عمرڪوٽ (Sindhi)
- City
- Amarkot
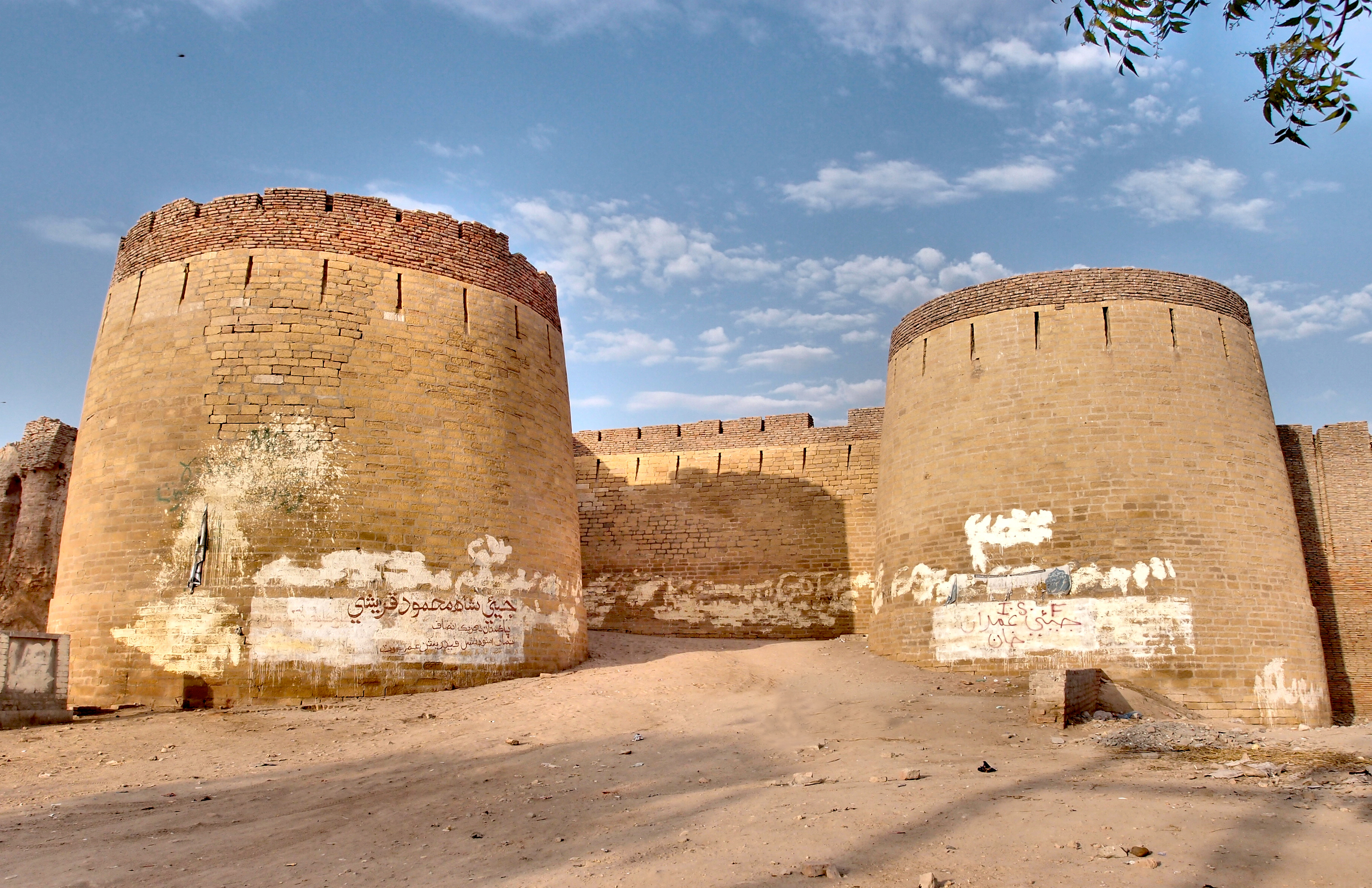
- The 11th century Umarkot Fort

- Location within Sindh Location within Pakistan
- Coordinates: 25°21′47″N 69°44′33″E
- Country: Pakistan
- Province: Sindh
- Division: Mirpur Khas
- District: Umerkot
- Metropolitan Corporation: Pre-islamic

Government
  - Type: Municipal Committee
  - Body: Municipal Committee Umerkot
  - Chairman: Saif Ullah Khalid
  - Vice-Chairman: Kumar Tilwani
  - Deputy Commissioner: Tahir Ali Memon

Area
  - City: 48.6 km^{2} (18.8 sq mi)

Population (2023)
  - City: 144,558
  - Rank: 80th in Pakistan
  - Density: 2,970/km^{2} (7,700/sq mi)
- Time zone: UTC+05:00 (PKT)
- Postal code: 69100
- Dialling code: 238

Umerkot (Urdu: عمرکوٹ; Dhatki: عمرڪوٽ; Sindhi: عمرڪوٽ; Urdu pronunciation: [ʊmərkoːʈ], formerly known as Amarkot) is a city in the Thar Region of the Sindh province of Pakistan. The Mughal emperor Akbar was born in Amarkot in 1542.

The Hindu folk deities Pabuji and Ramdev are traditionally said to have married in Umerkot. The local language is Dhatki, one of the Rajasthani languages of the Indo-Aryan language family. It is most closely related to Marwari.

== Etymology ==
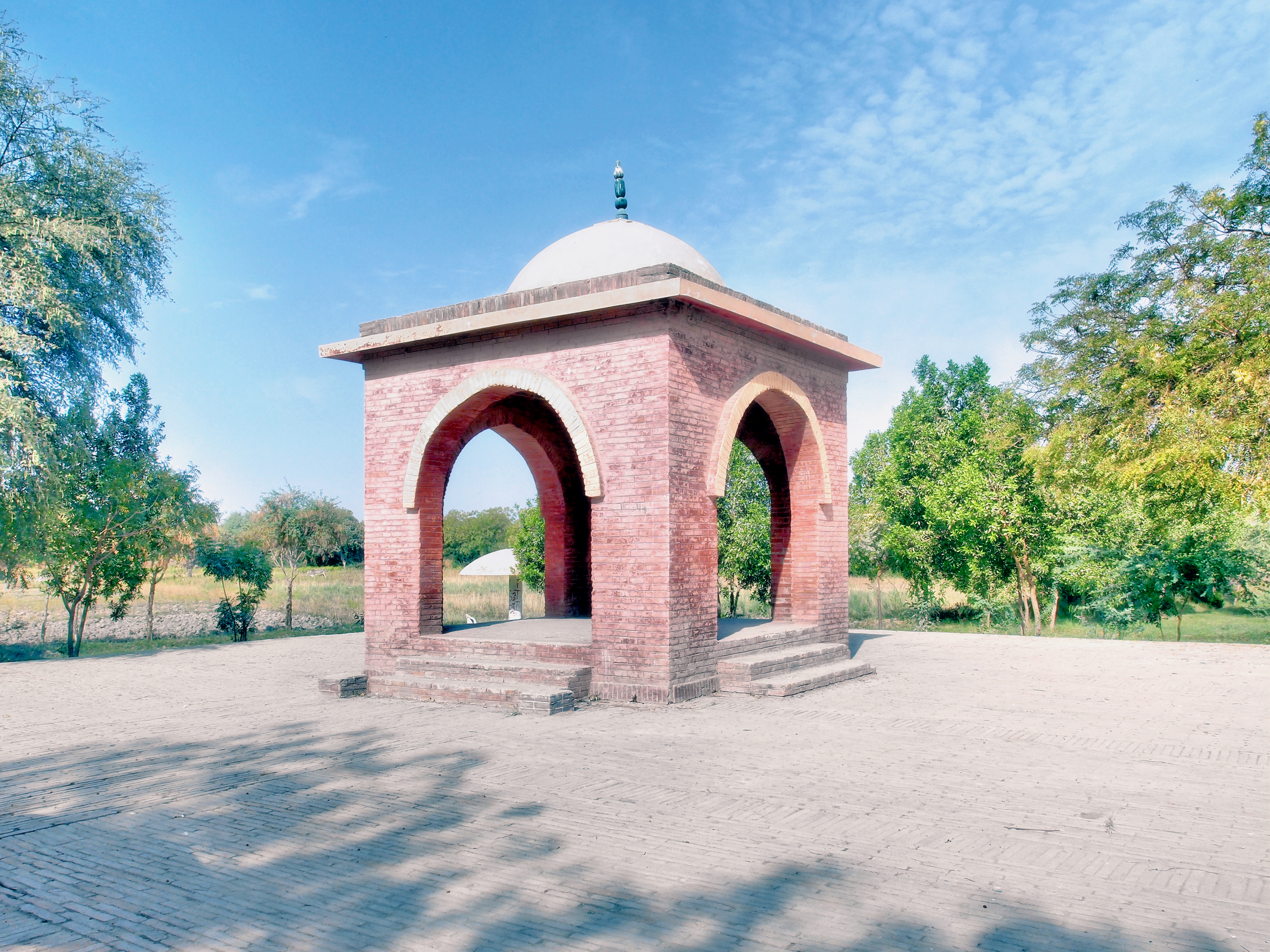
The traditionally believed birthplace of Akbar is marked by a small pavilion.

The city is named after a local ruler of Sindh, Umer Soomro (of Soomra dynasty) of the Umar Marvi folk tale, which also appears in Shah Jo Risalo, one of the popular tragic romances of Sindh.

== History ==
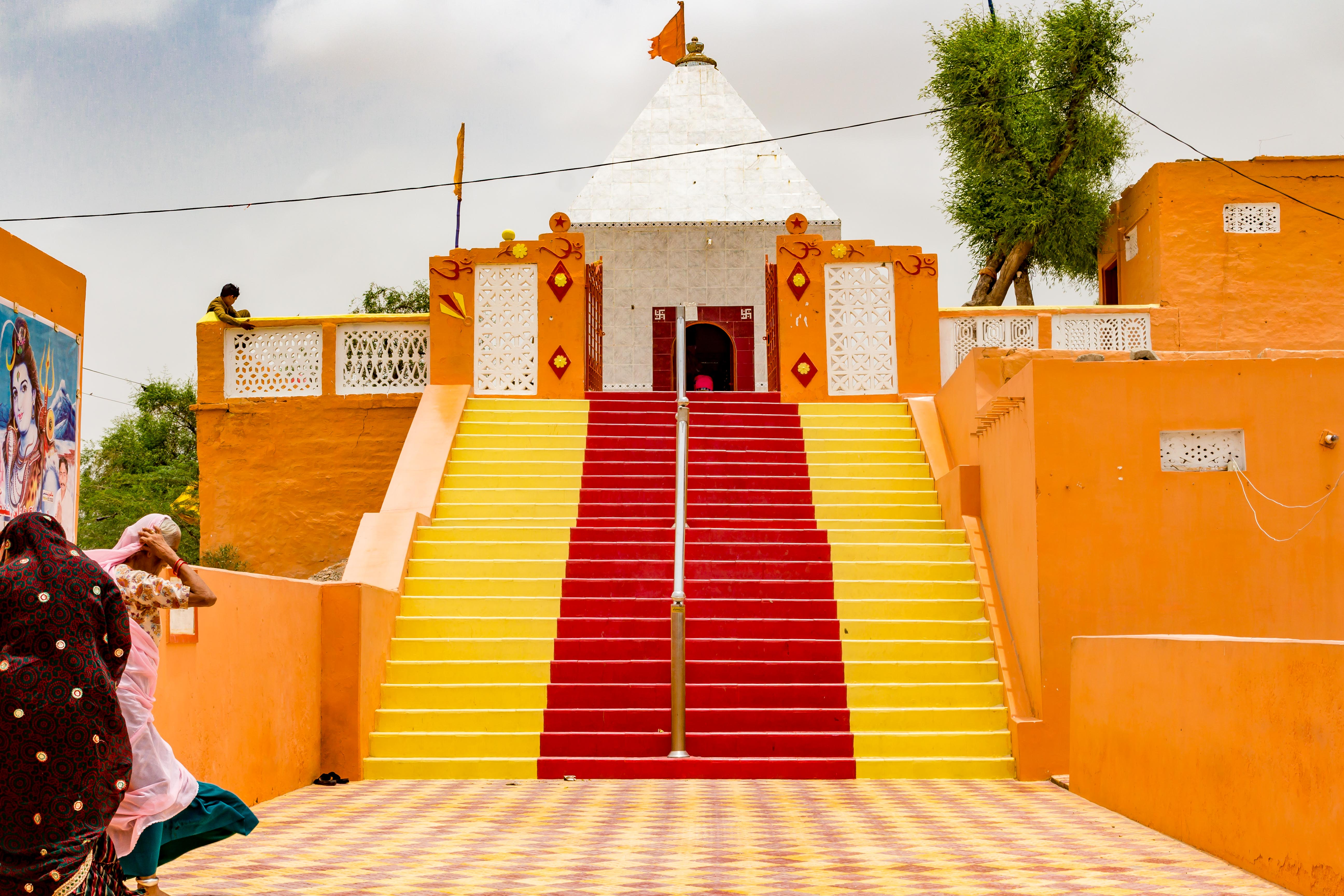
Umarkot Shiv Mandir-major pilgrimage centre in Sindh

According to tradition, it was founded by a branch of the Soomra who later lost it to Sodha in 1226. Sodhas were expelled by the Soomra in 1330 but again rose to power in 1439. Amarkot province was ruled by the Sodha Rajput clan during the medieval period. Rana Parshad, the Sodha Rajput ruler of Umarkot, gave refuge to Humayun, the second Mughal Emperor when he was ousted by Sher Shah Suri, and the following year Mughal Emperor, Akbar, was born here. Later on, Akbar brought northwestern India, including modern Pakistan, under Mughal rule. In 1590, it became a part of the Mughal Empire. In 1599, Abu ’l-Ḳāsim Sulṭān, an Arghun prince drove out the Mughal commander. In 1736, Noor Mohammad Kalhoro expelled the last Sodha chief and took control of it.

After the disintegration of the Mughal Empire, Amarkot was captured by several regional powers, including the Persians, Afghans, Kalhora and Talpur Baloch of Sindh, Rathore Rajputs of Jodhpur and finally by the British.

Amarkot was annexed by Jodhpur State in 1779 from the Kalhora Nawab of Sindh. Umerkot and its fort was traded to the British in 1843 by the Maharaja of Jodhpur in return for a Rs.10,000 reduction in the tribute imposed on Jodhpur State. The British appointed Syed Mohammad Ali governor of the province. In 1847, Rana Ratan Singh was hanged at the fort by the British, for killing Syed Mohammad Ali in a tax protest.

After the British conquered Sindh, they made it part of the Bombay Presidency of British India. In 1858, the entire area around Tharparkar became part of the Hyderabad District. In 1860 the region was renamed Eastern Sindh Frontier, with a headquarters at Amarkot. In 1882, it was reorganized as the Thar and Parkar district, headed by a British Deputy Commissioner, with a political superintendent at Amarkot. However, in 1906 the district headquarters moved from Amarkot to Mirpur Khas.

Rana Chandra Singh, a federal minister and the chieftain of the Hindu Sodha Thakur Rajput clan and the Amarkot Jagir, was one of the founding members of the Pakistan Peoples Party (PPP) and was elected to the National Assembly of Pakistan from Umarkot seven times as a PPP member between 1977 and 1999, when he founded the Pakistan Hindu Party (PHP). Currently, his politician son Rana Hamir Singh claims to be the 26th Rana of Tharparkar, Umarkot and Mithi.

== Points of interest ==
The city is well connected with the other large cities like Karachi, the provincial capital and Hyderabad.

Umarkot has many sites of historical significance such as Akbar's birthplace, Umarkot, Umerkot Fort and Momal Ji Mari.

There is an ancient temple, Shiv Mandir, Umerkot, as well as a Kali Mata Temple, Krishna Mandir at old Amarkot and Manhar Mandir Kathwari Mandir at Rancho Line.

== Education ==
The city has more than 100 schools, 20 colleges, and one polytechnic college.

== Demographics ==
Population

Historical population
Year	Pop.	±% p.a.
1951	5,142	—
1961	5,878	+1.35%
1972	8,381	+3.28%
1981	13,742	+5.65%
1998	35,559	+5.75%
2017	134,196	+7.24%
2023	144,558	+1.25%

According to 2023 census, Umerkot had a population of 144,558.

Languages

Languages of Umerkot MC (2023 Census)
1. Sindhi (97.7%)
2. Urdu (1.40%)
3. Others (0.90%)

=== Religion ===
The Umarkot Shiv Mandir is one of the most ancient and sacred Hindu temples in Sindh.

Religions in Umerkot district (2023)
Religion	Percent
Hinduism	55.52%
Islam	44.3%
Other or not stated	0.18%

== See also ==
- Islamkot
- Mithi
- District Government of Umerkot
- Tharparkar
- Umar Marvi

== Gallery ==
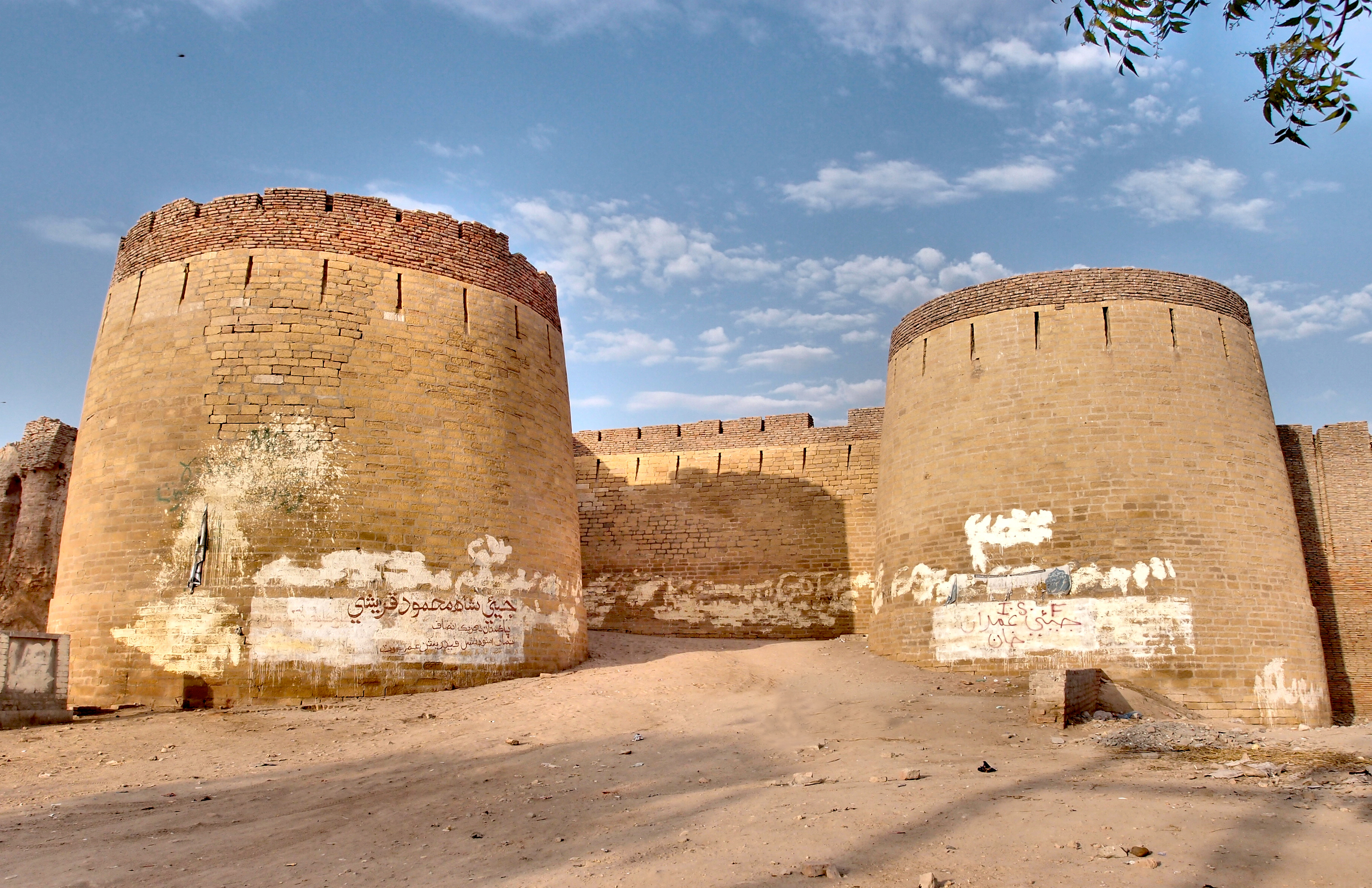
Umerkot Fort

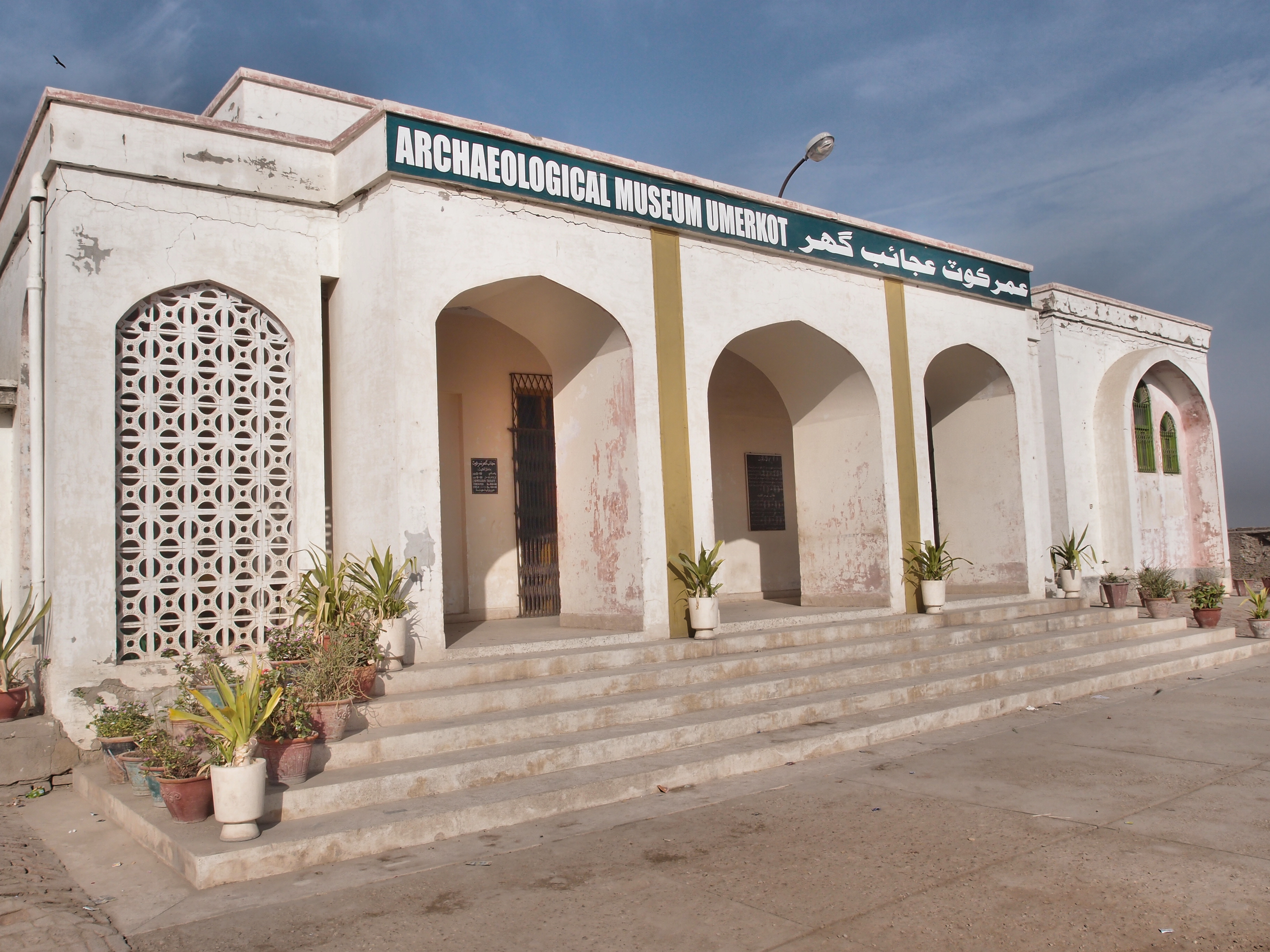
Umerkot Museum
