= Kunri Tehsil =

Kunri: کنری (Urdu); ڪنري (Sindhi)
- Tehsil Kunri highlighted in red
- Country: Pakistan
- Province: Sindh
- District: Umerkot District

Government
  - Body: District Government
  - Constituency: NA-213 Umerkot; PS-51 Umerkot-III
- Elevation: 11 m (36 ft)
- Highest elevation: 14 m (46 ft)
- Lowest elevation: 7 m (23 ft)

Population (2023)
  - Total: 237,063
  - Density: 405/km^{2} (1,050/sq mi)
- Time zone: UTC+05:00 (PKT)
  - Summer (DST): DST is not observed
- ZIP Code: 69100
- NWD (area) code: 238
- ISO 3166 code: PK-SD

Kunri (Urdu: کنری; Sindhi: ڪنري) is a Tehsil and town located in the Umerkot District, Sindh province in southern Pakistan. According to the 2023 Pakistani census, Kunri Tehsil had a population of 237,063.

Languages in Kunri Taluka (2023 Pakistani census)
1. Sindhi (86.8%)
2. Punjabi (5.75%)
3. Urdu (3.45%)
4. Others (3.99%)

== Chilli Capital ==
Kunri is known as the chili capital of Asia due to the prolific cultivation and production of chili peppers. The climatic conditions and soil of Kunri contribute to the chili quantity. The dundicut chili variety grown here are known for its distinct flavour and is exported to Arab, European countries etc. The Chili cultivation started here in 1960, when seeds were bought from Radha Ram region near Lahore. And within a decade Kunri became the largest chili market of Asia. The Chili Research center under the Sindh Horticulture Research Institute is located here.

== Education ==
Kunri is host to several small-scale educational institutions, including government high schools named Qazi Sultan, Fazal e Umer, and Nusrat Jahan.

== Religion ==
Religions in Kunri tehsil (2023)
Religion	Percent
Hinduism	56.37%
Islam	42.07%
Other or not stated	1.56%

Hinduism is followed by majority of the tehsil's population. Muslims form significant minority.

== See also ==
- Kunri Christian Hospital
