= Umerkot District =

Umerkot District: عمرڪوٽ ضلعو; ضلع عمرکوٹ; Amarkot District
- District of Sindh
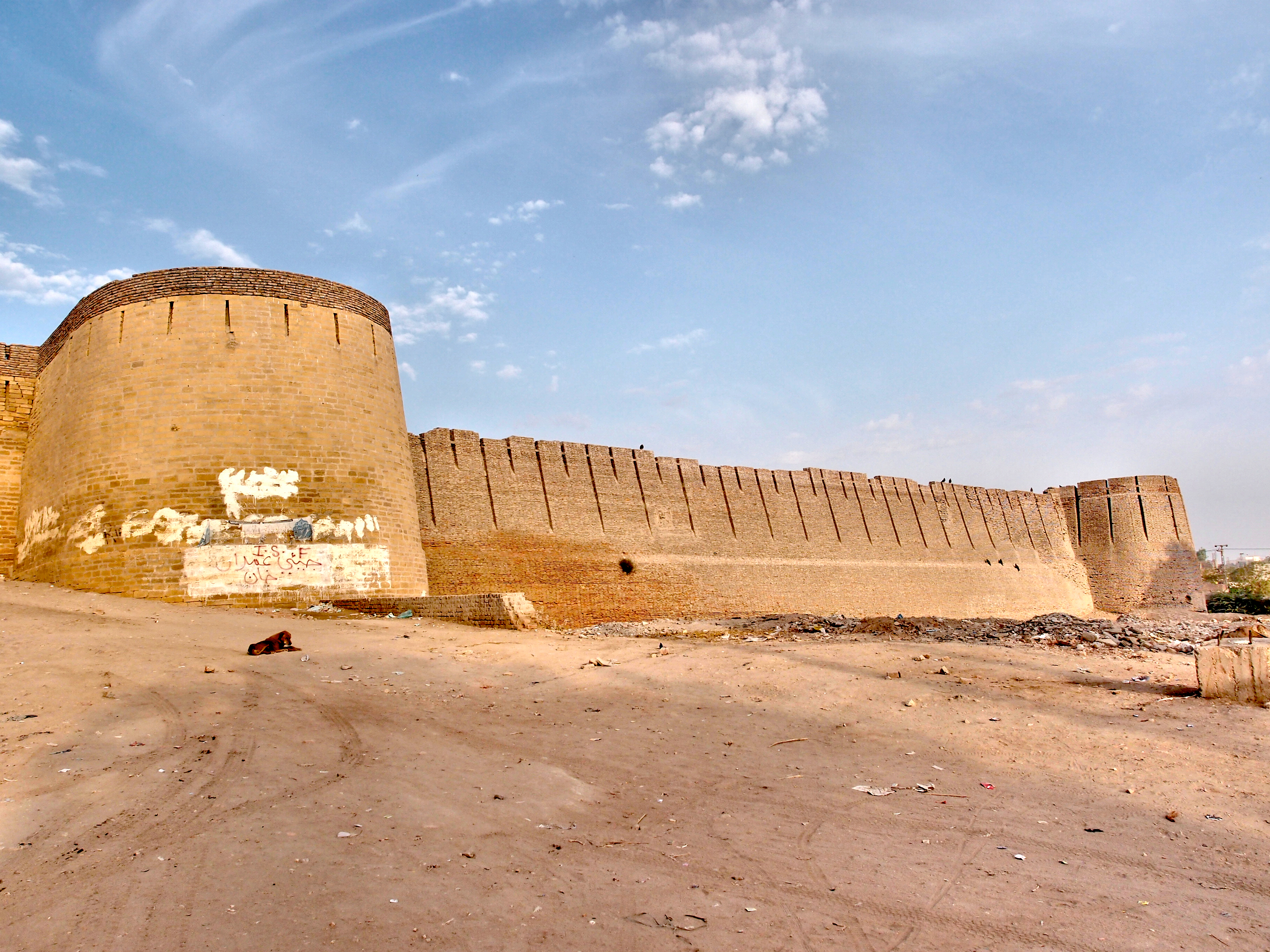
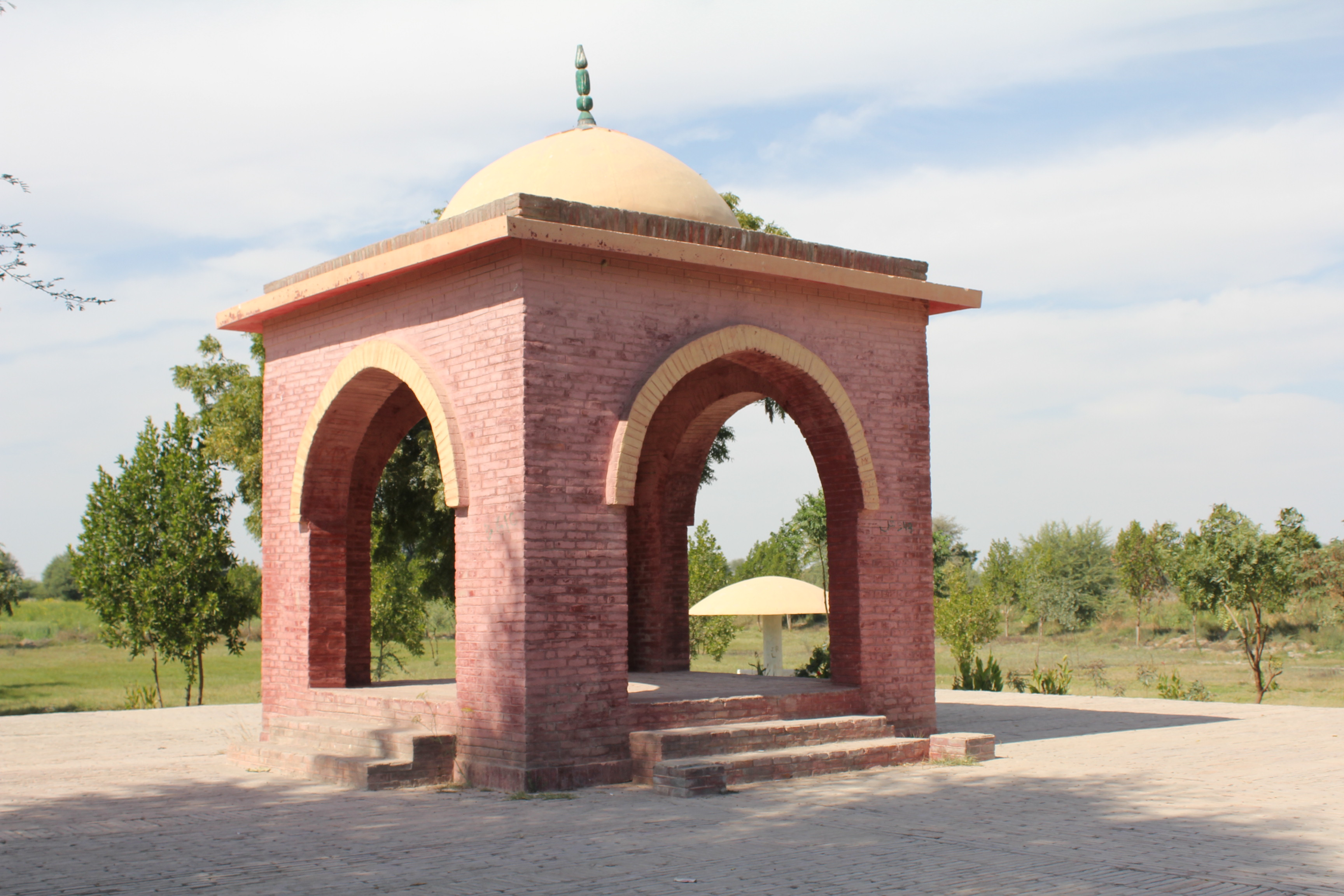
- Top: Umarkot Fort; Bottom: Birth place of Akbar

- Map of Sindh with Umerkot District highlighted
- Coordinates: 25°22′12″N 69°43′48″E
- Country: Pakistan
- Province: Sindh
- Division: Mirpur Khas
- Established: April 1993; 33 years ago
- Abolished: December 2000; 25 years ago
- Restored: December 2004; 21 years ago
- Headquarters: Umerkot
- Administrative Subdivisions: 04: Kunri Taluka Pithoro Taluka Samaro Taluka Umerkot Taluka

Government
  - Type: District Administration
  - Deputy Commissioner: Naveed Ur Rehman Larak
  - Constituensy: NA-213 Umerkot

Area
  - District of Sindh: 5,608 km^{2} (2,165 sq mi)
- Elevation: 21 m (69 ft)
- Highest elevation: 90 m (300 ft)
- Lowest elevation: 3 m (9.8 ft)

Population (2023)
  - District of Sindh: 1,159,831
  - Density: 206.8/km^{2} (536/sq mi)
  - Urban: 258,859 (22.32%)
  - Rural: 900,972

Literacy
  - Literacy rate: Total: 38.69%; Male: 51.17%; Female: 25.11%
- Time zone: UTC+05:00 (PKT)
  - Summer (DST): DST is not observed
- ZIP Code: 69100
- NWD (area) code: 238
- ISO 3166 code: PK-SD
- Website: www.umerkot.gos.pk

Umerkot District (Dhatki: عمرکوٹ / عمرڪوٽ, Sindhi: عمرڪوٽ ضلعو, Urdu: ضلع عمرکوٹ), also known as Amarkot District, is a district in the southeastern part of Sindh province of Pakistan. The city of Umerkot is the capital of the district. Sindhi is the native language of approximately 95.1% of the residents according to the 2023 Pakistani census. According to latest census estimate, the population of district is 1,158,284 (1.15 million). Umerkot is the only non-Muslim majority district in Pakistan, with adherents of Hinduism representing 54.7% of the total population as per 2023 Pakistani census.

== History ==
The region was first ruled by the Sodhas of Amarkot from 1226. Following the military defeat from Sher Shah Suri, Mughal ruler Humayun was given protection by the Amarkot Sodha Rajput King Rana Prasad. His son Akbar was born here in 1542. The region was later ruled by Kalhora dynasty (1657-1783) and then the Talpurs dynasty (1783-1843). During the British conquest of Sindh in 1843, British commander Charles Napier defeated the Talpurs. He became the governor of Sindh. Following the creation of Pakistan, the region was under the Mirpurkhas district. In 1993, it was made a district. However, in 2000, the district was abolished and merged to Mirpurkhas. In 2004, the district was reestablished.

The Umerkot district was initially created in 1993 comprising four talukas (Umerkot, Samaro, Kunri and Pithoro), but later on, due to some political reasons, it was abolished and merged with Mirpur Khas district in December 2000. However, after four years, it was restored.

== Administration ==
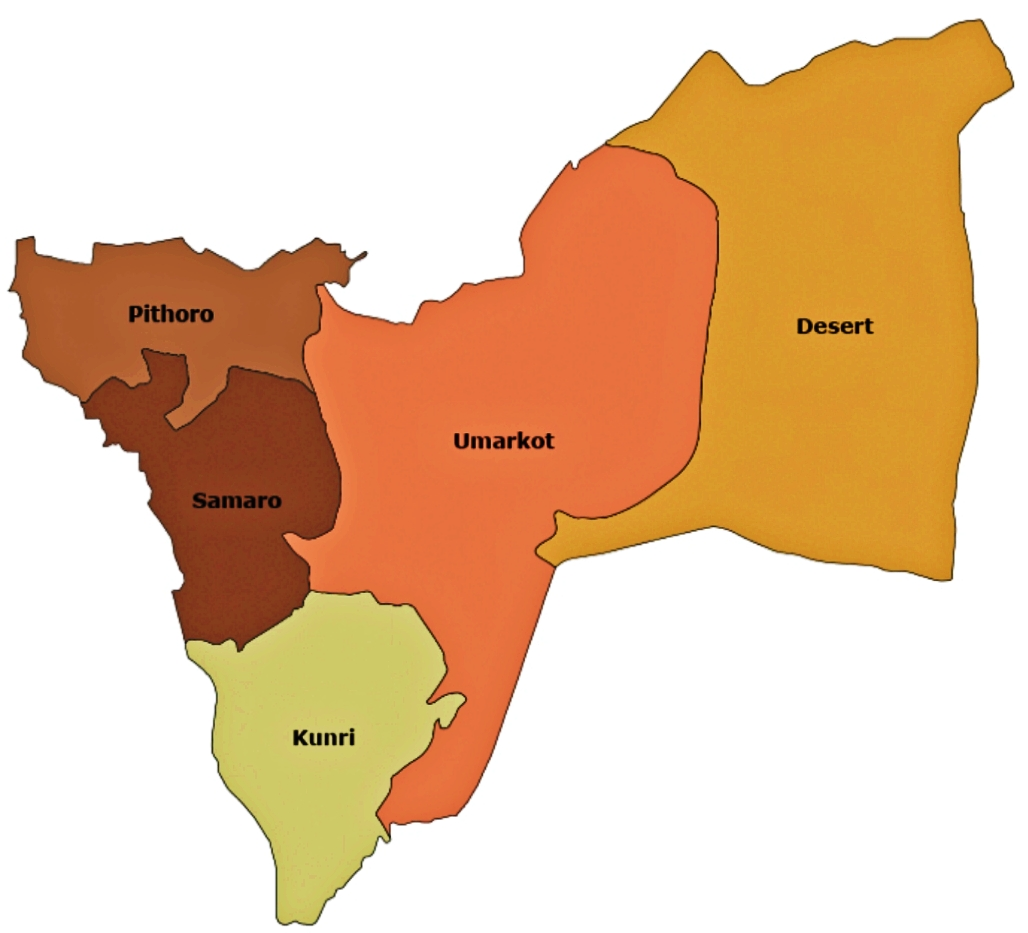
Map of Umerkot District's tehsils

District Coordination Officer is co-ordinating head of District administration and he is required to ensure that business of various group of offices is carried out in accordance with the laws, and to act as Principal Accounting Officer. Presently Ghulam Akbar Laghari is the District Coordination Officer of District Umerkot.

Executive District Officer is executive head of his respective group of offices.

Musalihat Anjuman are also constituted in each union council consisting of panel of three Musaleheen where the matters are referred even by any competent court having jurisdiction for amicable settlement.

The district is administratively subdivided into the following Tehsils:

- Kunri
- Pithoro
- Samaro
- Umarkot

== Geography ==
Geographically district Umerkot is located in the south-east corner of Sindh.

It is surrounded by Sanghar district in the north, Mirpur Khas district in the west and Tharparkar in the south-east.

== Demographics ==
Historical population
| Year | Pop. | ±% p.a. |
|---|---|---|
| 1998 | 664,797 | — |
| 2017 | 1,073,469 | +2.55% |
| 2023 | 1,159,831 | +1.30% |

As of the 2023 census, Umerkot district has 222,562 households and a population of 1,159,831. The district has a sex ratio of 109.73 males to 100 females and a literacy rate of 38.69%: 51.17% for males and 25.11% for females. 406,585 (35.1% of the surveyed population) are under 10 years of age. 258,859 (22.32%) live in urban areas.

=== Languages ===
Languages of Umerkot district (2023)
1. Sindhi (95.1%)
2. Punjabi (1.80%)
3. Urdu language (1.40%)
4. Others (1.67%)

At the time of the 2023 census, 95.13% of the population spoke Sindhi, 1.8% Punjabi and 1.4% Urdu as their first language. Dhatki dialect of Sindhi is spoken in the district.

== Religion ==
Religions in Umerkot district (2023)
| Religion | Percent |
| Hinduism | 54.66% |
| Islam | 44.83% |
| Other or not stated | 0.51% |

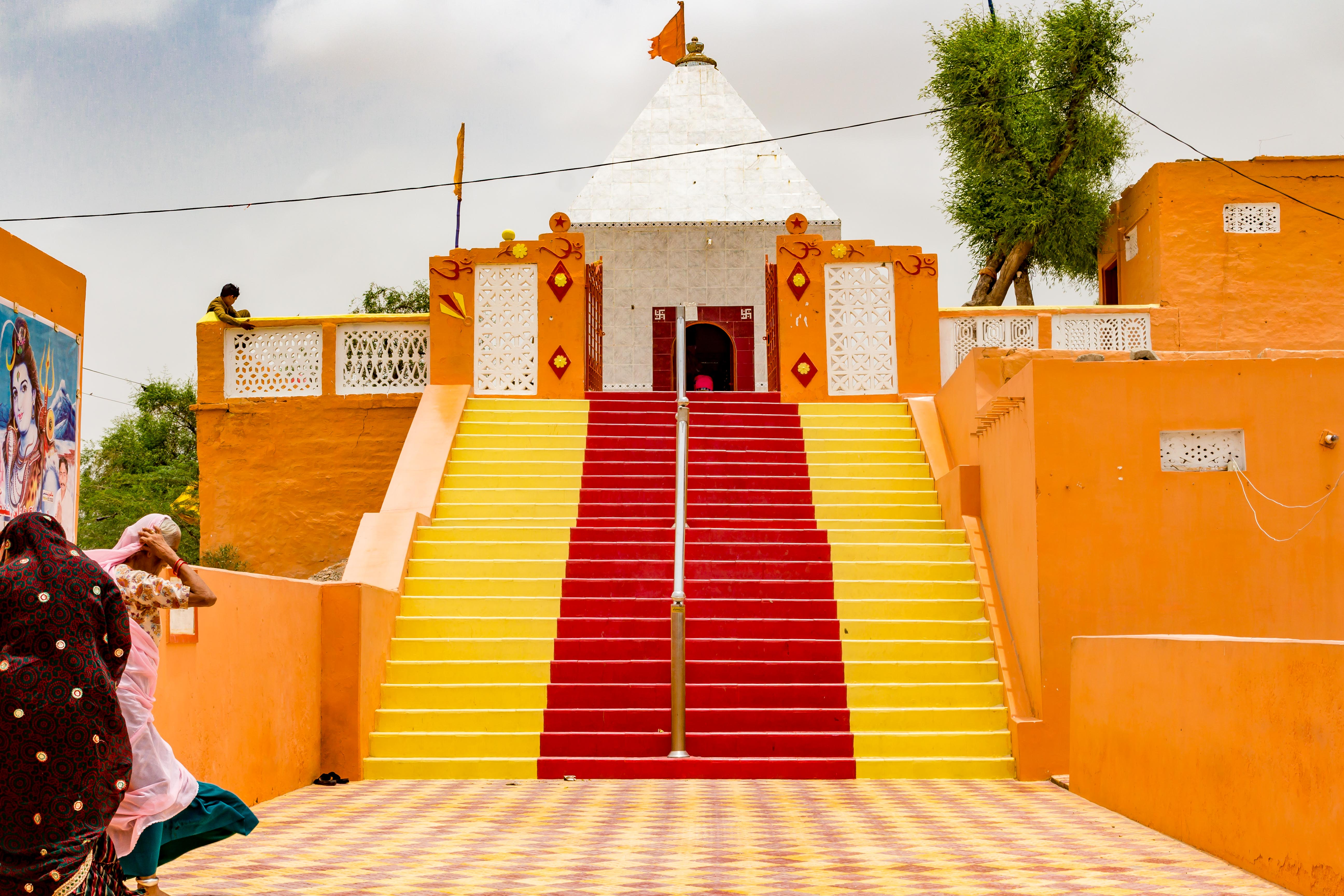
Umarkot Shiv Mandir

Umerkot is the only Hindu majority district in Pakistan. Hindus form around 55% and Muslims form around 45% of Umerkot's population.

The Umarkot Shiv Mandir in Umerkot is one of the oldest and most sacred Hindu temples in the Sindh. The annual Maha Shivratri celebration of the temple is one of the biggest religious festivals in Pakistan and is attended by around 250,000 people.

Religion in contemporary Umerkot District
| Religious group | 1941 (Note: Note: 1941 census data is for Samaro and Umerkot talukas of Tharparkar District, which roughly corresponds to the contemporary district.) | | 2017 | | 2023 | |
| Religious group | Pop. | % | Pop. | % | Pop. | % |
|---|---|---|---|---|---|---|
| Islam | 55,175 | 46.36% | 507,691 | 47.29% | 519,276 | 44.83% |
| Hinduism | 54,055 | 45.41% | 559,824 | 52.15% | 633,114 | 54.66% |
| Tribal | 7,522 | 6.32% | —N/a | —N/a | —N/a | —N/a |
| Sikhism | 1,943 | 1.63% | —N/a | —N/a | 36 | ~0% |
| Christianity | 280 | 0.24% | 2,326 | 0.22% | 2,702 | 0.23% |
| Ahmadi | —N/a | —N/a | 3,594 | 0.33% | 3,093 | 0.27% |
| Others (Note: Including Jainism, Christianity, Buddhism, Zoroastrianism, Judaism, Ad-Dharmis, or not stated) | 51 | 0.04% | 34 | 0.01% | 63 | 0.01% |
| Total Population | 119,026 | 100% | 1,073,469 | 100% | 1,158,284 | 100% |

Population of taluks by religion (2023)
| Taluk | Hindus | Muslims | Others |
|---|---|---|---|
| Kunri | 56.37% | 42.07% | 1.56% |
| Pithoro | 48.48% | 50.85% | 0.67% |
| Samaro | 53.98% | 45.87% | 0.15% |
| Umerkot | 55.52% | 44.3% | 0.18% |

== List of Dehs ==
The following is list of Umerkot District's dehs, organised by taluka:

- Umarkot Taluka (90 dehs)
  - Aahir East
  - Ahori Chore
  - Ashabo
  - Banhyari
  - Behrai Thar
  - Belo Karna
  - Bhodar
  - Chelari
  - Chore Thar
  - Chundawah
  - Debo
  - Dhorosirin
  - Dingralo
  - Dinore
  - Diyatbah
  - Doodhar
  - Dugoo
  - Gamoori
  - Gapno
  - Gorsar
  - Harh
  - Hasisar
  - Horingo
  - Janhero Pat
  - Janhero Thar
  - Juneja
  - Kacholi
  - Kaith
  - Kalri
  - Kaplore
  - Karna
  - Khalrai Thar
  - Kharoro Jagir
  - Kharoro Pat
  - Kharoro Thar
  - Khejrari
  - Khiral
  - Khirohi
  - Khunhar
  - Kunar
  - Kunjeli
  - Lalabah
  - Laplo
  - Larh
  - Lashari
  - Makhyaro
  - Mandhal
  - Marwah
  - Mehparo
  - Mokhal Bah
  - Muhammad Aalam Palli
  - Nabisar Thar
  - Narhadi
  - Noonhyoon
  - Okkaro
  - Old Chore/Chore Purano
  - Padrio
  - Panjoi
  - Parhyaro
  - Rabario
  - Rajar Thar
  - Rajari Thar
  - Sabhri Pat
  - Sabrhi Thar
  - Sabo
  - Sadoori Pat
  - Sadoori Thar
  - Sahib Tar
  - Sarangsar
  - Sarreti
  - Senhoi Thar
  - Shakh Khejrari
  - Shekhro
  - Sidhore
  - Sonhari
  - Sonpur
  - Soofi
  - Soonhin
  - Tal
  - Tangore
  - Tar Samoon
  - Tebhri
  - Thathrai
  - Timo Mitho
  - Umerkot Pat
  - Umerkot Thar
  - Veerasar
  - Vehro Thar
  - Walhate
  - Walidad Palli

- Samaro Taluka (59 dehs)
  - 207
  - 207-A
  - 325
  - 326
  - 327
  - 327-A
  - 12-Hiral
  - 13-Hiral
  - 13-A Hiral
  - 14-Hiral
  - 15-Hiral
  - 16-Hiral
  - 17-Hiral
  - 18-Hiral
  - 19-Hiral
  - 20-Hiral
  - 21-Hiral
  - 22-Hiral
  - 23-Hiral
  - 24-Hiral
  - 25-Hiral
  - 26-Hiral
  - 27-Hiral
  - 28-Hiral
  - 29-Hiral
  - 30-Hiral
  - Araro
  - Araro Bhurgari
  - Bhambhra
  - Bhurgari
  - Bikhori
  - Chach
  - Chachh Bhurgari
  - Chan Qabol
  - Dabho
  - Dengan Bhurgari
  - Gharo Bhiro
  - Gora Band
  - Hassan Baghban
  - Jhaluri
  - Kangani
  - Khani
  - Kharoro East
  - Khosan Ji Wai
  - Kinjhji
  - Liyari
  - Lolan
  - Moraso
  - Old Samaro
  - Potho
  - Ram Jago
  - Sandharo
  - Shah Hassan
  - Shakh Samaro
  - Soonthi
  - Tibuhi
  - Timo Kharo
  - Tobhan Wari
  - Waraso

- Pithoro Taluka (48 dehs)
  - Akri Wadi
  - Bandho
  - Bareji
  - Bhitaro
  - Changul
  - Chhachro
  - Chhelyoon
  - Dandhi
  - Darero
  - Dengan Palli
  - Ghulam Nabi Shah
  - Gorhadi
  - Gularki
  - Gurki
  - Hiral-1
  - Hiral-2
  - Hiral-3
  - Hiral-4
  - Hiral-5
  - Hiral-5/A
  - Hiral-6
  - Hiral-7
  - Hiral-9
  - Hiral-10
  - Hiral-11
  - Jago
  - Jambho Kandi
  - Jhirkyari
  - Karu
  - Khambhri
  - Khuda Bux Mari
  - Khun
  - Korki
  - Lanairo
  - Langani
  - Morhango
  - Muhari
  - Naar
  - New Khipri
  - Palli
  - Pirore
  - Pithoro
  - Saaduri
  - Shadi Palli
  - Sinhedi
  - Ubandh
  - Vikhadi

- Kunri Taluka (38 dehs)
  - Barani
  - Bustan
  - Chajro
  - Char
  - Dadhro
  - Dambherlo
  - Darelo
  - Fateh Dandh
  - Gharakaringa
  - Goraho
  - Haido
  - Janjhi
  - Kandiyari
  - Karchelo
  - Khamno
  - Kharo Kun
  - Khuda Bux Chandio
  - Kunri
  - Kuria
  - Malansar
  - Malook Shah
  - Manjhakar
  - Mayadars
  - Mojan
  - Moondawai
  - Morjhango
  - Nabisar
  - Naseer Chandio
  - Rahmore
  - Rajari Pat
  - Ranawai
  - Rindki
  - Sadki
  - Sanwari
  - Seerkhi
  - Shahliwai
  - Shakh Darelo
  - Talhi

== See also ==
- Umarkot Shiv Mandir
- Dhatki language
