= Rana Hamir Singh =

Pakistani politician

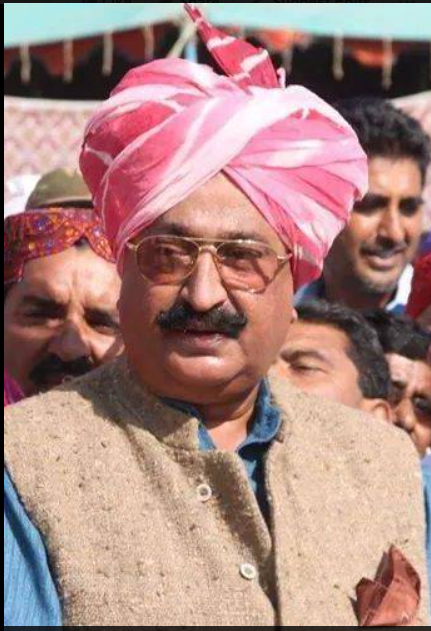
- Rana in 2020

Member of the Provincial Assembly of Sindh
- In office 13 August 2018 – 11 August 2023
- Constituency: Reserved for Minorities

Personal details
- Born: 11 March 1957 (age 69) Umerkot, Sindh, Pakistan
- Party: PPP (1990-present)
- Relations: Rana Arjun Singh (grandfather); Rana Chandra Singh (father)
- Children: Kanwar Karni Singh (son)

Rana Hamir Singh is a Pakistani politician who had been a member of Provincial Assembly of Sindh from August 2018 to August 2023. He is one of the five children of Rana Chandra Singh. He is also titled as 'Raja Saheb'.

== Family ==
His grandfather Rana Arjun singh contested election in 1946 from All-India Muslim League platform. His father Rana Chandra Singh was initially associated with Pakistan Peoples Party but left it to form Pakistan Hindu Party in 1990. He has one son, Kanwar Karni Singh, who was married into Kanota Rathore royal family of Jaipur in 2015. His ancestors were the Hindu Rajput Rulers of Amarkot.

== Political career ==
Singh has been member of Sindh Assembly three times. In 1990, he was elected from the platform of Pakistan Hindu Party on separate electorate for minorities. In 1993, he was a minister for science and technology and research in irrigation. He has been Naib Nazim of Umerkot and vice chairman of Sindh Arid Zone Development Authority.
