= Umarkot Fort =

Historic fortification in Sindh

- قِلعہ عُمَرکوٹ
- Part of Sodha Rajputana until 1947
- Umerkot District, Sindh
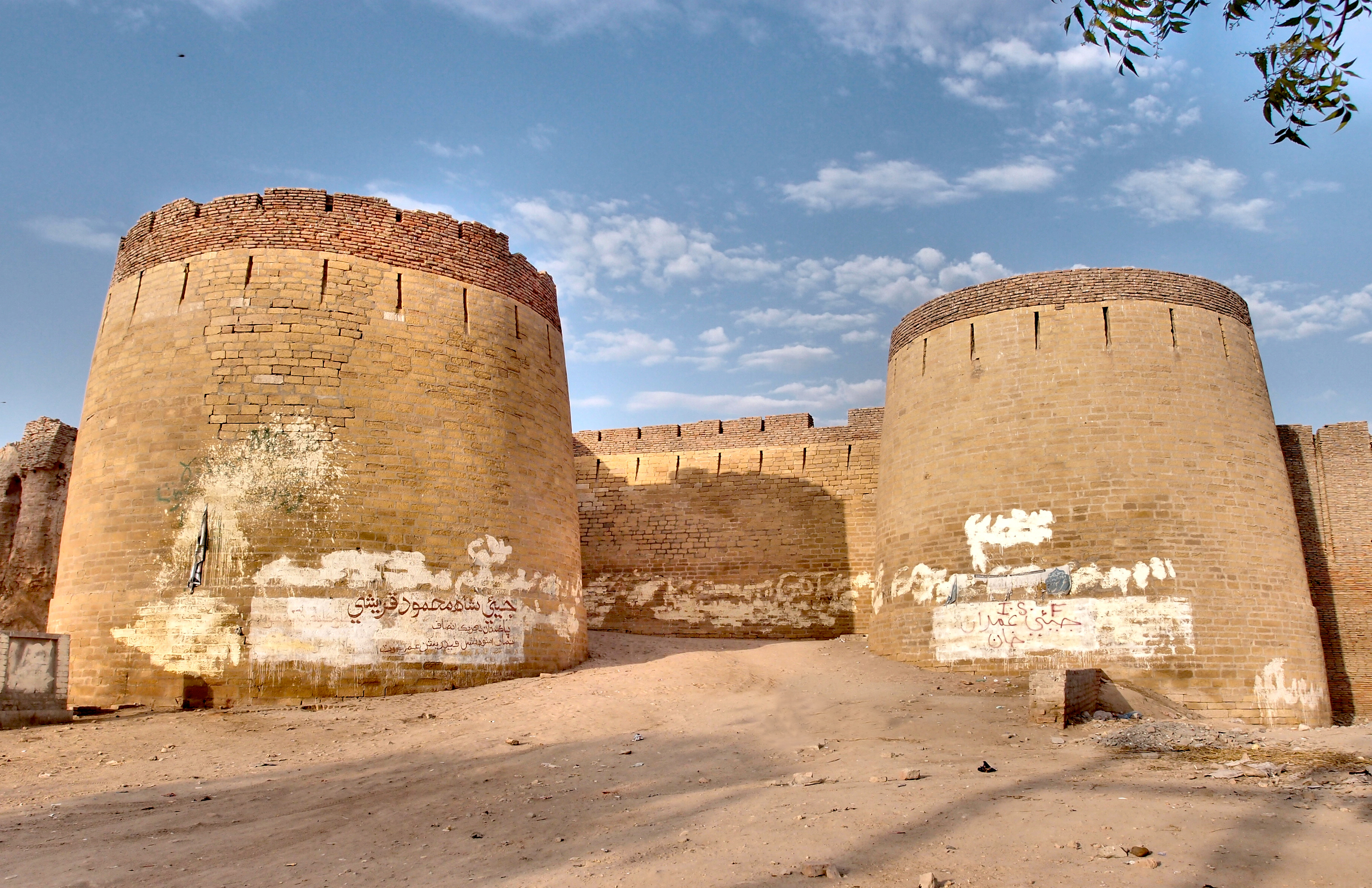
- Fort Tower of Umarkot Fort

Site information
- Type: Desert Fortification
- Controlled by: Pakistan
- Open to the public: Yes
- Condition: Protected Monument

Location
- Coordinates: 25°21′49″N 69°44′2″E

Site history
- Built: 11th century
- Built by: Rana Amar Singh

Umarkot Fort (Urdu: قِلعہ عُمَرکوٹ; Sindhi: عمر ڪوٽ جو قلعو), also called Amarkot (Urdu: امَرکوٹ; Sindhi: امرڪوٽ), is a fort in Umerkot, Sindh, Pakistan, built in the Rajput style of architecture.

== History ==
Amarkot Fort was built by Rana Amar Singh in 11th century. It remained under control of Sodha Rajput dynasty known as the Ranas of Umerkot, but later was taken over by the Pakistani Government after the formation of Pakistan. However, the Rana family still has their jagir located 16 km away. The governorship of the fort was possessed by Rana Megraj.

Akbar was born in Umarkot Fort when his father Humayun fled from the military defeats at the hands of Sher Shah Suri on 15 October 1542. Rana Prasad Singh Sodha of Umarkot, who had risen to power, had given refuge to Humayun, and it was there that Hamida Bano Begum gave birth to young Akbar. Later, Akbar became the Shahenshah of Hindustan. Umerkot has many sites of historical significance such as Akbar's birthplace near Umarkot Fort. Currently, Akbar's birthplace is an open land. In 1746, the Mughal Subahdar, Noor Mohammad Kalhoro, built a fort at the location. Later the British took over that area.

== Folklore ==
Another significant story relating to Umarkot is that of Umar Marvi. Marvi was a young Thari girl abducted by Umar, the then ruler, who wanted to marry her because of her beauty. Upon her refusal, she was imprisoned in the historic Umerkot Fort for many years until her ultimate release. Because of her courage, Marvi is an ideal for the local people.

== See also ==
- List of World Heritage Sites in Pakistan
- List of forts in Pakistan
- List of museums in Pakistan
