= International Museum Day =

Annual day highlighting the role of museums

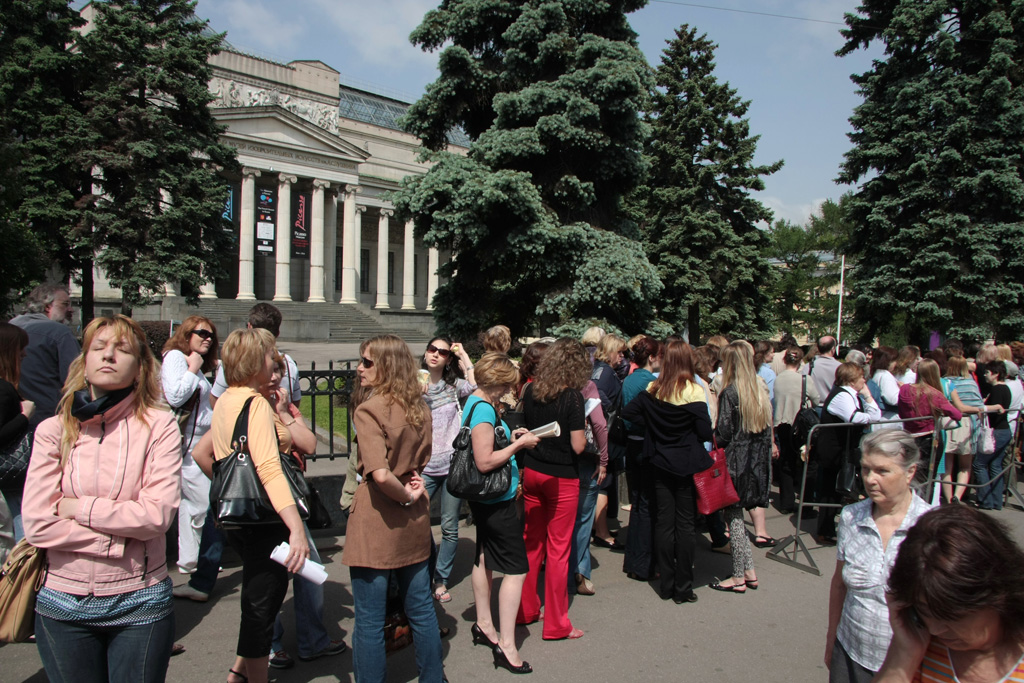
People visiting the Pushkin Fine Arts Museum on International Museum Day

International Museum Day (IMD) is an international day held annually on or around 18 May, coordinated by the International Council of Museums (ICOM). The event highlights a specific theme which changes every year reflecting a relevant theme or issue facing museums internationally. IMD provides the opportunity for museum professionals to meet the public and alert them as to the challenges that museums face, and raise public awareness on the role museums play in the development of society. It also promotes dialogue between museum professionals.

== History ==
The first International Museum Day took place in 1977, coordinated by ICOM. IMD was established following the adoption of a resolution by ICOM to create an annual event "with the aim of further unifying the creative aspirations and efforts of museums and drawing the attention of the world public to their activity."

Each year, museums are invited to participate in IMD to promote the role of museums around in the world. They do so through events and activities related to the annual theme. An annual theme for the event was first adopted in 1992. An international poster from ICOM was first developed in 1997, and in that year was adapted by 28 countries. In 2009, IMD attracted the participation of 20,000 museums hosting events in more than 90 countries. In 2010, 98 countries participated in the celebration, with 100 countries in 2011, and 30,000 museums in 129 countries in 2012. In 2011, the official IMD poster was translated into 37 languages. By 2014, 35,000 museums from 140 countries were taking part in IMD.

== Themes ==
- 2026 – Museums Uniting a Divided World
- 2025 – The Future of Museums in Rapidly Changing Communities
- 2024 – Museums for Education and Research
- 2023 – Museums, Sustainability and Well-being
- 2022 – The Power of Museums
- 2021 – The Future of Museums: Recover and Reimagine
- 2020 – Museum for Equality: Diversity and Inclusion
- 2019 – Museums as Cultural Hubs: The Future of Tradition
- 2018 – Hyperconnected museum: New approaches, new publics
- 2017 – Museums and Contested Histories: Saying the unspeakable in museums
- 2016 – Museums and Cultural Landscapes
- 2015 – Museums for a Sustainable Society
- 2014 – Museum collections make connections
- 2013 – Museums (memory + creativity = social change)
- 2012 – Museums in a changing world. New challenges, new inspirations
- 2011 – Museum and memory: Objects tell your story
- 2010 – Museums for social harmony
- 2009 – Museums and tourism
- 2008 – Museums as agents of social change and development
- 2007 – Museums and universal heritage
- 2006 – Museums and young people
- 2005 – Museums bridging cultures
- 2004 – Museums and intangible heritage (Intangible cultural heritage)
- 2003 – Museums and friends
- 2002 – Museums and globalisation
- 2001 – Museums: building community
- 2000 – Museums for peace and harmony in society
- 1999 – Pleasures of discovery
- 1998–1997 – The fight against illicit traffic of cultural property
- 1996 – Collecting today for tomorrow
- 1995 – Response and responsibility
- 1994 – Behind the scenes in museums
- 1993 – Museums and indigenous peoples
- 1992 – Museums and environment

== Timeline ==
=== 2007 ===
Museums in approximately 70 countries participated in the event. For this edition, the message that was conveyed was We are all responsible for universal heritage. In Angola, a debate on The Contribution of the National Museum of Anthropology on Asserting Cultural Identity was organised. In Algeria, two days were devoted to the theme of heritage and museology in Algeria, the objective being to submit a project to set up a centre for training museum professionals. The Colombo National Museum in Sri Lanka organised visits and workshops for certain schools aimed at teaching pupils to identify with their heritage. At the Acadian Museum of the University of Moncton (Canada), a conference was held to discuss the issues involved in preserving Acadian oral heritage in a museum as a centre of conservation and dissemination. In Israel, the Historic Museum of Bethlehem partially opened on the occasion of IMD. In Botswana, the site museum of Tsodilo celebrated the event by organising performances of plays, music and traditional dances. In Peru, the inhabitants of Lima were invited to the Fifth Feria of "Museums within your reach" with the participation of 30 museums from Europe and Central Asia.

=== 2009 ===
In 2009, ICOM partnered WFFM (the World Federation of Friends of Museums) in order to promote the event.

=== 2010 ===
In 2010, museums from 96 countries participated in the event, organised around the theme Museums for social harmony.

In Mongolia, the theatre museum invited kindergarten children to attend a play in the museum.

The Samarkand State Museum of Cultural History in Uzbekistan organised an impressive performance with the award-winning children's dance ensemble Jonona. It was followed by a musical slide show displaying the Samarkand region's historical heritage.

In Sri Lanka, the Department of National Museums provided an educational programme with mobile exhibitions for students in the northern region of the country as a means to encourage peace and social harmony among the ethnic groups who are living in the north and the south of the country.

The Calouste Gulbenkian Museum (Museu Calouste Gulbenkian) in Portugal arranged a special reception for visitors in a bid to highlight its initiative of creating a club for 23 local teenagers with anti-social behaviour.

=== 2011 ===
About 30,000 museums in 110 countries participated in the celebration of IMD 2011, under the theme Museum and Memory: Objects tell our story.

Five topics were developed during International Museum Day 2011:

- Care and access to collections and documents.
- Museums' history.
- Forgotten memory.
- The link between memory, community and identity, including family identity.
- Africa's cultural contribution to the world.

In Australia, the National Sports Museum in Melbourne organised a programme called Remembering the Moments that Made Us where visitors of the museum had the opportunity to meet and talk with sporting legends (Memory Makers) who contributed to great sporting moments and memories.

In Malaysia, seminar with international speakers, exhibitions, sport carnivals, workshops and educational programmes were organised in various museum around the country.

In Sudan, the Natural History Museum in Khartoum created an educational programme for families and school children who were able to participate in a photography competition on the theme "Documenting Our Natural History".

In Argentina, the Museo Argentino de Ciencias Naturales Bernardino Rivadavia in Caballito (Buenos Aires) suggested a programme entitled Musecuentos especially established for this occasion. Storytellers shared stories that were highlighted by the museum's objects.

In Belgium, the Royal Museum of Mariemont, offered guided tours on the theme Objects' CV.

The conservation and transmission of collective memory is a preoccupation for other heritage players, beyond the museum community. For this reason, for the first time ever, the International Council of Museums initiated institutional partnerships with other organisations that feel concerned by these questions and share ICOM's preoccupation for the preservation of memory:

- UNESCO with the Memory of the World programme.
- Co-ordinating Council of Audiovisual Archives Associations (CCAAA)
- International Council on Archives (ICA)
- International Council on Monuments and Sites (ICOMOS)
- International Federation of Library Associations and Institutions (IFLA)

=== 2012 ===
The International Museum Day 2012 was celebrated around the theme Museum in a changing world. New challenges, new inspirations.

To celebrate the 35th anniversary of the International Museum Day, the ICOM Fund sponsored a photo contest entitled Me in my museum. The participants had to take photos of themselves, alone or with their friends, in or outside their favourite museums with the official logo created for the event. The winners of the "Me in my museum" contest were Yonit and Efrat, from Israel, whose picture was taken in front of the Tel Aviv Museum of Art.

In many countries, International Museum Day is the occasion to celebrate museums and their activities. For instance, each year, the month of May is Museums Month in Guatemala, organised with the Ministry of Culture of Guatemala. This year, the theme was New challenges and new inspirations.

In Brazil, the week of 14–20 May is the opportunity to organise museum activities over several days, and the 18th is celebrated as a national holiday. For the 10th edition of National Museums week, activities such as exhibitions, conferences, guided tours and workshop were organised in Brazilian cities. Museums as well as heritage institutions provided dance performances, music, theatre, poetry contests and more.

In Peru and Bolivia, International Museum Day is followed by the Long Night of Museums. Visitors have both day and night to visit museums and the event is celebrated in both countries every year.

In Lithuania, the year 2012 was declared as the Year of Museums, in honour of the bicentenary opening of the first public museums in the country.

The Museu do Falso (Viseu, Portugal) opened on 18 May 2012, for International Museum Day. Visitors were able to discover the unique Museum of History, made from contributions by contemporary artists, working under the premise of Simulacrum: What if a given event occurred differently from how it did?. This aimed to serve as a hub for cultural actors and citizens.

In Côte d'Ivoire, IMD 2012 was celebrated in the structure of the Palais Royal of Abenguru. Local institutions and ICOM Côte d'Ivoire organised various events including discussions, game contests for students and guided tours. About 1,500 people joined in the celebrations with important political and cultural actors from the country.

Hans-Martin Hinz, President of ICOM, launched the event from Bahrain, with the visit to the National Museum's exhibition Tylos: Journey Beyond Life that recounted burial rites and customs in the ancient history of Bahrain. He then experienced the mobile museum Enkiru, an extension of the exhibition specifically geared for children aged 7 to 11. Finally, he participated in a workshop devoted to emerging museum professionals organised by the National Committee of Bahrain, in partnership with ICOM Arab. Meanwhile, the ICOM President personally thanked Chinese and Argentine museums by sending them a video, broadcast during the launch ceremonies for International Museum Day in China and Argentina.

To celebrate the event, Julien Anfruns, Director General of ICOM, delivered the keynote address on the 17 May at the conference "Science Museums and New Technologies" organized by the ICOM International Committee for Education and Cultural Action (CECA) in Rome, Italy. He was also a panellist and keynote speaker at the International Bar Association's conference about new legal challenges in the arts which took place at the MAXXI – National Museum of the 21st Century Arts, Rome).

==== Partners ====
- European Night of Museums: For the second year, ICOM patronized the European Night of Museums, an event which echoes IMD in the spirit of an all day and all-night weekend dedicated to museums.
- CNES: The CNES Space Observatory partnered with International Museum Day to offer a contemporary and original view on museum practice. It proposed sharing the questions raised by evolutions in the concept of space over the centuries to a curious and varied public, by organising various events in a great many European museums.
- Museum Together: On the occasion of International Museum Day, ICOM supported the Museum Together project, a social application that aims to foster the organisation of meetings around museums and encourage the sharing of cultural experiences.

=== 2013 ===
The museum community decided to celebrate IMD 2013 around the theme: Museums (Memory + Creativity) = Social Change.

In Peru, the Pachacamac Site Museum scheduled an outdoor interactive project called Paint and Identify in the Pintado Temple to remember the paintings that once decorated this monument.

In Pakistan, the Museum of Natural History in Islamabad organised a Nature Poster Drawing Competition on the theme of Water and biodiversity, in which students from different schools participated by portraying the beauty of nature.

The National Museum of History of Moldovain Chişinău, Moldova organised a workshop for the public on experimental archaeology, paper folding techniques, history and the art of writing.

=== 2014 ===
The 2014 theme was Museum collections make connections.

Sharjah Museums in the United Arab Emirates carried out an Instagram project called #heartifact, inviting the public to photograph objects that are meaningful to them and post them along with a short description. The museum then created a collage of the images and shared it with the public on International Museum Day.

In Itu, Brazil, the Museu da Energia organised an event called Arte no Beco (Art in the Alleyway), bringing the museum to the street to raise awareness on the significance of museums and heritage preservation.

In Tibet, the Tibet Museum in Dharamshala took part in IMD events with a schedule of special programmes including guided tours, talks, demonstration of thangka painting and showcase of traditional Tibetan costume.

=== 2015 ===
In 2015 the theme was Museums for a sustainable society.

The Uganda Museum in Kampala, in Uganda, encouraged visitors to take a plant home or plant a tree at the museum to do their part in creating a sustainable environment. The National Forestry Authority donated trees to the cause.

The "Sc'Arti in Mostra" exhibition organised and promoted by the province of Avellino, in Italy, was the product of an art contest inspired by the themes of reusing and recycling waste through art. The exhibition, open to the public, supported a culture of recycling.

=== 2016 ===
About 35,000 museums in 145 countries on all continents participated in IMD 2016.

The theme of the 2016 event is Museums and Cultural Landscapes.

The National Gallery of Victoria in Australia organised a conference to discuss how public and private institutions gather their collections and how such collecting can create or preserve a cultural landscape.

The Chimczuk Museum in Windsor, Canada, used International Museum Day as an opportunity to open the "Fighting in Flanders" exhibition in the presence of the Belgian ambassador to Canada.

=== 2017 ===
The theme for this year was Museums and contested histories: Saying the unspeakable in museums, highlighting the role of museums for promoting peaceful relations while confronting contested historical narratives. 2017 saw a new record in the number of institutions and countries taking part in IMD, with 36,000 museums from 156 countries.

=== 2018 ===
In 2018 the theme for IMD was Hyperconnected Museums: New approaches, new publics. 143 regions or countries took part in the event and 92 countries celebrated the day as a national holiday.

=== 2019 ===
The 2019 IMD was themed Museums as Cultural Hubs: The future of tradition, the same theme as the 2019 ICOM General Conference in Kyoto.

=== 2020 ===
Due to the COVID-19 pandemic, IMD 2020 under the theme, Museums for Equality: Diversity and Inclusion, was primarily marked with virtual events.

=== 2021 ===
In 2021, the IMD theme focused on the impact of the COVID-19 pandemic on museums, and how they can recover from the impact under the theme The Future of Museums: Recover and Reimagine. During the pandemic the world's top 100 museums saw visitor numbers fall by 77%.
