= François Gautier =

French journalist and advocate for an Indigenous Aryan narrative

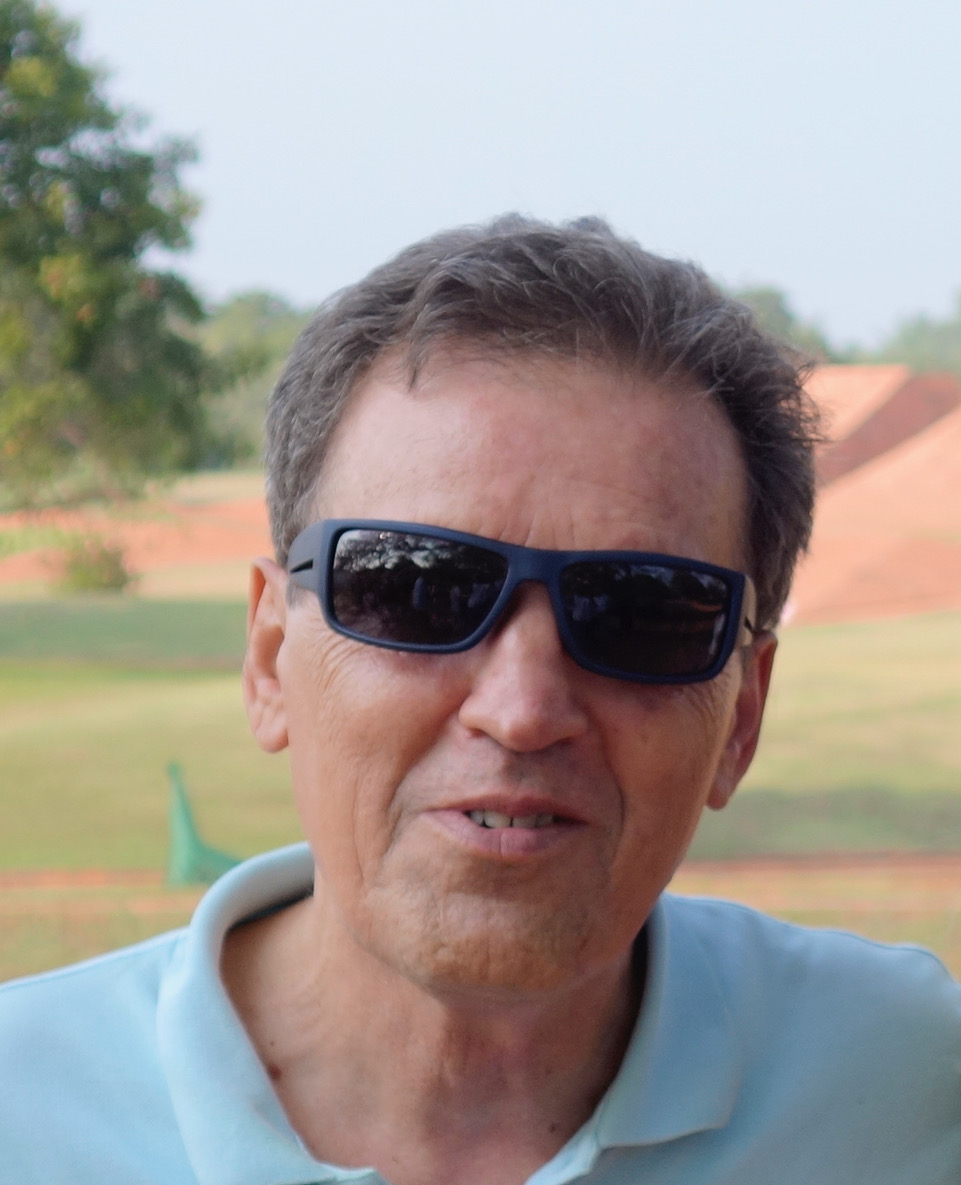
- Born: 1950 (age 75–76); Paris, France
- Occupations: Journalist, historian and columnist
- Spouse: Namritā Bindrā Kāūr
- Writing career
- Years active: 1982–present
- Genre: Politics
- Subjects: Politics, Hindutva, Indian History
- Notable works: The Wonder that is India, Un Autre regard sur l'Inde
- Notable awards: Panchjanya's Nachiketa Awards, Bipin Chandra Pal Award
- Website: www.francoisgautier.me FACT Museum of Indian history

François Gautier (born 1950) is a journalist and Hindutva activist based in India who served as the South Asian correspondent for multiple reputed French-language dailies.

He is also the founder of a private museum which seeks to portray Indian history in a nationalist manner. Gautier has written books on the history and Indology; he has established NGO namely Foundation for Advancement of Cultural Ties.

== Life ==
=== Early life ===
Francois Gautier was born in 1950 in Paris and received an upper-class Catholic education. He was subsequently sent to reputed boarding schools across Europe, from where he was expelled several times. Gautier said that he "never really fitted in the system". He attended the IDRAC business school in Paris before dropping out to work in a small newspaper.

Gautier came to India at the age of 19 in 1969, as part of a trans-world journey, along with the first wave of Auroville-migrants. He was accompanied by the son of Charles François Marie Baron, Pondicherry's last French governor. Deeply impressed with Sri Aurobindo's writings, he chose to reside over Sri Aurobindo Ashram where his encounters with Mirra Alfassa influenced him to further prolong his stay. Gautier went on to stay over there for about seven years.

== Personal life ==
François Gautier is married to Namrita Bindra Gautier, whose mother was a Hindu and father a Sikh. Gautier primarily resides in Auroville in India, and visits his family in France annually.

== Career ==
=== Journalism ===
After arriving in India, Gautier stopped writing for many years and focused on other activities. In 1982, he found an article in a French newspaper, that he considered to contain clichés about the Indian society and politics. He wrote a letter to the editor suggesting corrections, wherein he was offered to write an article. He wrote several more articles for the newspaper and went on to work as a writer and photographer for other publications.

He served as the South-Asia correspondent of Journal de Genève, a Geneva-based newspaper before switching to the same post at Le Figaro in 1993. He stayed over there for about 8 years before shifting to Ouest-France and then, La Chaîne Info.

Gautier used to write a regular column for Rediff.com. Gautier has also written columns for The New Indian Express, DNA India, Outlook India, and others. He is also the editor of La Revue de l'Inde.

=== Writing ===
Gautier became interested in Indology when he began to travel outside Auroville. Sita Ram Goel contacted Gautier after reading some of his articles in a magazine called Blitz and asked for permission to reprint the articles in his book. Gautier instead wrote the book The Wonder That Is India. Later, the website Hinduism Today republished it online. Following this, Gautier wrote several other books. Gautier is also working on two books, one about Kalaripayattu, an Indian martial art from Kerala, and another on French influence in India, with the help of photographer Raghu Rai.

In 2010, an anonymously authored novel titled Hindutva, Sex and Adventure was published that featured a foreign radio journalist who came to India and became a Hindutva supporter—it was considered to be a satire of BBC reporter Mark Tully. It was speculated that Gautier may have been the author, but he denied the allegation.

=== Photography and painting exhibitions ===
Gautier has established the Foundation for Advancement of Cultural Ties (FACT), a NGO dedicated to portraying Indian history in a "correct" manner. It has organised multiple painting exhibitions across the country to depict and highlight how a range of events from the insurgency in Jammu and Kashmir to the cruelties of Mughal emperors has affected the life of Hindus. He eventually planned to establish a museum similar to Holocaust museums. Gautier also planned to tour the world with his museums and educate the foreign community about the systemic extermination of Hindus. The exhibitions have received mixed responses and the underlying motives have been questioned.

In 2012, the Shivaji Maharaj Museum of Indian History was established by FACT. In 2013, during the visit of the 14th Dalai Lama, Gautier and his wife, organised an exhibition on the origin of Buddhism in India and its spread to Tibet with the help of materials from the Tibet Museum of Dharamsala, to educate the local people about Tibetan culture.

== Views and opinions ==
Gautier, who is critical of the partition of India, has advocated for Indian reunification, stating "as long as Pakistan and India are divided there will be other Kashmirs, other Ayodhyas, other wars with Pakistan—nuclear maybe—and India will never be at peace with its own Muslim community, which is a permanent danger to herself."

Gautier contends that India, through the exercise and spread of Sanatan dharma shall strive to be a global superpower but prior to that shall decentralize the economy and Indianize its social, political and educational systems, even at the cost of democratic principles and the constitution. In abidance with a Hinducentric scholarship, he has criticized the narrative of Indian historiography to be leftist, which have apparently glorified foreign invaders at the cost of the Hindu empires, and thus urges for a complete revisionism.

A front-line Hindutva activist, Gautier also deems Hinduism to be under threat from Islam, Christian missionaries, Marxism and westernisation. He calls for use-of-force by the oppressed Hindus and opines of the Buddhist-Jain philosophies of Ahimsa to have actually enabled exploitation of India by foreign invaders. One of his most prominent views is about the Hindu Holocaust perpetrated by Islamic invaders which exceeded the extents of the Jew Holocaust and all other genocides. Gautier has also rejected the western-oriental scholarship of Max Müller, Arthur Llewellyn Basham as ill-portrayals of the history of the nation which birthed the theory of Hindu imperialism.

Gautier accepts the Indigenous Aryan hypothesis in favor of the Indo-Aryan migration theory and supports the idea of Jesus Christ having come to India, to be inspired by Hindu and Buddhist esoterism. He also considers Koenraad Elst as one of the most knowledgeable scholars on India and regretted of his' being unable to publish except from Hindu-oriented publishing houses. A staunch opponent of Nehruvian ideologies, he has critiqued Gandhi's policy towards Muslim separatists during the partition of India as Muslim-appeasement. Gautier have also attacked the existence and manifestation of caste privilege in the Indian society and derivatives thereof, instead arguing for a hypothesis wherein the socially and economically privileged and dis-privileged populaces are in a constant flux and which primarily manifests in reverse discrimination in the long run.

He has criticized the United Progressive Alliance government (2009-2014) and claimed that terrorism continued unabated whilst Muslim mullahs were allowed to preach freely and Hindu gurus were being targeted by the media and police. He has earlier criticized the usage of the term "Godman" by Indian media to describe self-proclaimed Hindu gurus proposing that Indian journalists often were not proud of their culture and had called for imparting a more fairer treatment.

== Reception ==
Manisha Basu, writing in The Rhetoric of Hindu India, deems him to be part of a suave derivative of Hindutva and notes of his consistent attacks upon left-liberal commentators—people who have supposedly leveraged their social privilege to dominate the socio-political consciousness of the "Anglophone national bourgeoisie" for long enough—in the process of becoming one of the few self-appointed interpreters of the Indian Right. Malini Parthasarathy too notes him to be a prominent voice of Hindutva, others have noted him as an ideologue as well. Basu remarks of his attacks against the constructs of Brahmanic privilege (and other intersectionalities) along with the radical perspectivising of proper historiography to be mere statistical extensions of first-hand-experiences have a high degree of similarity to Jay Dubashi's writings and his broader views about the journalistic model of history. Scholars have rejected his theories of a Hindu-Holocaust and have deemed him to be Islamophobic.

He was subject to severe criticism after having objected to the proposed induction of Aamir Khan, a Muslim Bollywood actor over a planned dramatization of Mahabharata, a Hindu epic. He had earlier asked for the boycott of PK, a Bollywood film starring the same actor, due to its depiction of a Hindu-Muslim love affair and accused Ashoka University of teaching an anti-Hindu anti-Brahmin book.

In 2017, Gautier claimed over a blog at The Times of India to have come across a hitherto-hidden manuscript of Nostradamus in a trunk, that (successfully) prophesied the statesmanship of Narendra Modi. The claims were reported across multiple news-outlets. Earlier he had asserted of Nostradamus to have established the Rashtriya Swayamsevak Sangh, an Indian Hindu nationalist organisation. Other claims included that Nostradamus had successfully prophesied the chances of a possible nuclear war between India and Pakistan, the construction of Ram Mandir and the Hindu domination of world affairs after 2014. He later said in an interview that this had been a "spoof", but it was taken in earnest by some leftist commentators who accused him of having tampered with the original passages for fulfilling his political agenda. At one case, he used the same passage over his blogs across the course of a few years but changed the name of the subjects to keep up with the political currents. Gautier has been accused by rivals to have propagated fake news over other occasions through left media outlets.

== Awards ==
- 2003 Panchjanya's Nachiketa Awards: The Bipin Chandra Pal Award, named after the historical figure Bipin Chandra Pal, was given to Gautier. He donated the money to FACT.

== Bibliography ==
- The Wonder that is India. Voice of India. 1994. ISBN 978-81-85990-17-0.
- Rewriting Indian History. Vikas Publishing House. 1996. ISBN 978-0-7069-9976-1.
- Un Autre regard sur l'Inde (in French). TRICORNE. 2000. ISBN 978-2-8293-0215-2.
- Arise Again, O India!. Har-Anand Publications. 2000. ISBN 978-81-241-0518-4.
- A Western Journalist on India: The Ferengi's Columns. Har-Anand Publications. 2001. ISBN 978-81-241-0795-9.
- India's Self-denial. Auroville Press International. 2001. ISBN 978-81-87373-12-4.
- A New History of India. Har-Anand Publications. 2008. ISBN 978-81-241-1430-8.
- The Guru of Joy. Hay House, Inc. 2008. ISBN 978-1-4019-2140-8.
- A History of India as it Happened: Not as it Has Been Written. Har-Anand Publications. 2013. ISBN 978-81-241-1762-0.
- An Entirely New History of INDIA. Independently published. 2020. ISBN 979-8576882021.

== See also ==
- David Frawley
