= Tibet Museum =

Tibet Museum may refer to:

- Tibet Museum (Dharamsala)
- Tibet Museum (Lhasa)
- Tibet Museum (South Korea)
- Tibet Museum (Gruyères)
