= Persecution of Hindus =

Hindus have experienced both historical and ongoing religious persecution and systematic violence, in the form of forced conversions, documented massacres, genocides, demolition and desecration of temples, as well as the destruction of educational centres.

== Medieval India ==
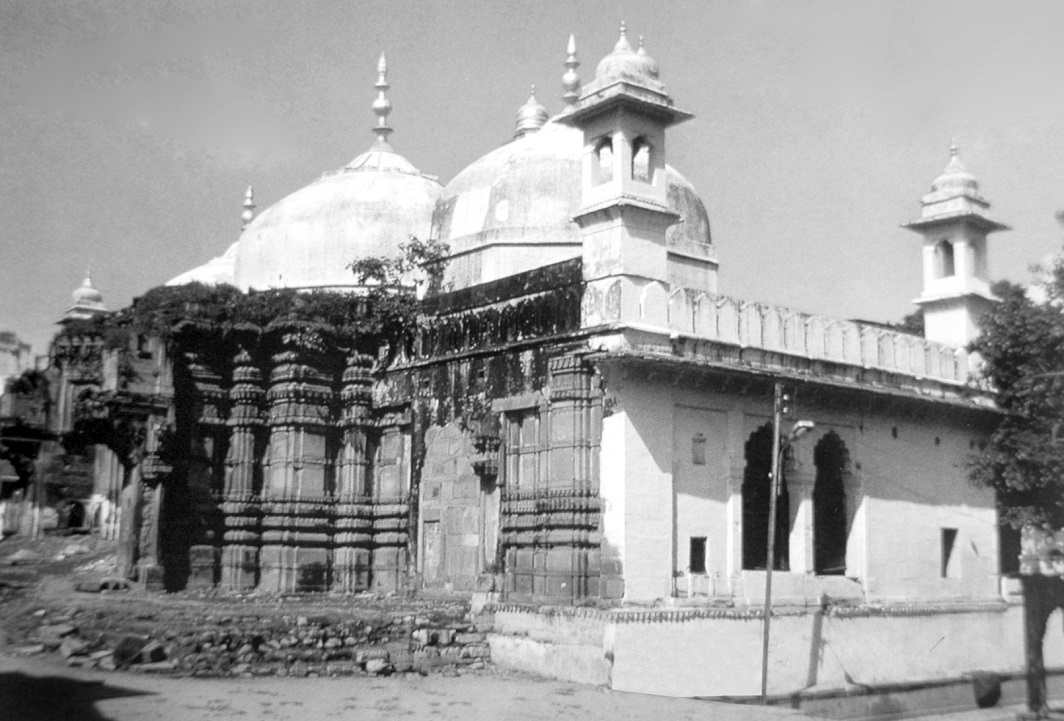
Gyanvapi Mosque is located in Varanasi, Uttar Pradesh, India. It was constructed by Aurangzeb in 1669 upon demolition of an older Shiva temple.

Parts of India were subject to Muslim rule from the period of Muhammad ibn Qasim till the fall of the Mughal Empire. There is a tendency among some historians to view the Muslim conquests and Muslim empires as a prolonged period of violence against Hindu culture, with Will Durant calling the Muslim conquest of India "probably the bloodiest story in history." (Note: Will Durant called the Muslim conquest of India "probably the bloodiest story in history".)

David Lorenzen asserts that during the period of Islamic rule, there was state-sponsored persecution against Hindus, but that it was sporadic and directed mostly at temple buildings, not people. However, he also points to the mentions of socio-religious conflict by poets like Kabir. The extent of persecution of Hindus under Muslim rule is subject to scholarly debate, and there have been criticisms that the historiography of India is being distorted by communal politics.

=== Destruction of religious architecture ===
According to André Wink, the mutilation and destruction of Hindu religious murtis and temples were an attack on Hindu religious practice, (Note: Devout Hindus cherish the manifestation of the divine everywhere such as in icons, people, and sacred places. Hinduism is "embedded in its sacred iconography, sacred prosopography and its sacred geography", states Wink, considered an "aid in contemplating the divine". These form the fundamental structure behind Hindu pilgrimage, mythology, festivals, and community just like the other major Indian religions.) and the Muslim destruction of religious architecture was a means to eradicate the vestiges of Hindu religious symbols. Muslim texts of this period justify it based on their contempt and abhorrence for what they perceived as idols and idolators in Islamic thought. (Note: The Muslim court historians describe the desecrated sacred cities of Hindus in demeaning terms. For example, they describe Mathura – an ancient city sacred in Sat Sanātana Dharma as the birthplace of Krishna – as "the work of demons (jinn)", and refer to the sacred murtis as well as the devotees (Hindus) who use them in puja as "devils" (shayatin). The architecture of Hindu temples underwent change under the Muslim rulers and incorporated Islamic influences. The Vrindavan temples, built under Akbar, lack ornamentation as imagery was generally prohibited.) Peter Jackson notes that the Muslim historians of the medieval era viewed the creation and expansion of Islamic sultanates in Hindustan as "holy war" and a religious conquest, characterizing Muslim forces as "the army of Islam" and the Hindus as infidels. According to Jackson, these records need to be interpreted and relied upon with care given their tendencies to exaggerate. This was not a period of "uncompromising iconoclasm", states Jackson. Cities that quickly surrendered to the Islamic army, says Jackson, "got a better deal" for their religious monuments.

According to Richard Davis, targeting sacred temples was not unique to Muslim rulers in India. Some Hindu kings too, prior to the formation of first Islamic sultanates in India, expropriated sacred mūrtis from temples and took it back to their capitals as a political symbol of victory. However, the temples and looted icons carried away were still considered sacred and treated accordingly with respect by the victorious Hindu king and his forces, states Richard Davis. There is hardly any evidence of "mutilation of divine images and intentional defilement" of Hindu sacred icons or temples by armies controlled by Hindu rulers. The evidence that is available suggests that the victorious Hindu kings undertook significant effort to house the expropriated mūrtis in new, grand temples within their kingdom. According to Wink, Hindu destruction of Buddhist and Jain places of worship took place before the 10th century, but the evidence for such 'Hindu iconoclasm' is incidental, too vague, and unconvincing. According to Wink, mutilation and defilement of sacred icons is rarely evidenced in Hindu texts, in contrast to Muslim texts on the Islamic iconoclasm in India. Hindu temples were centres of political resistance which had to be suppressed.

=== Effect on Hindu learning ===
Bukka Raya I, one of the founders of Vijaynagar Empire, had taken steps to rehabilitate Hindu religious and cultural institutions which suffered a serious setback under Muslim rule. Buddhists centres of learning decayed, leading to the rise to prominence of Brahmanical institutions.

A lot of Vedantic literature got translated into regionals languages based on Sanskrit between the 12th and 15th centuries.

=== Muhammad bin-Qasim ===
Muslim conquests in the Indian subcontinent began in the early 8th century CE with the army led by Muhammad ibn Qasim. This campaign is narrated in the Chach Nama by Bakr Kūfī, a 13th-century manuscript which claimed to be based on an earlier Arabic record.

The Chach Nama mentions temple demolitions, mass executions of resisting Sindhi forces and the enslavement of their dependents; kingdoms ruled by Hindu and Buddhist kings were attacked, their wealth plundered, tribute (kharaj) settled and hostages taken, often as slaves to Iraq. According to Wink, a historian specializing in Indo-Islamic period in South Asia, these Hindus were given the choice to either convert to Islam and join the Arab armies, or be sealed (tattooing the hands) and pay the jizya tax. The Chach Nama and evidence in other pre-11th century Persian texts suggests that these Hindu Jats also suffered restrictions and discrimination as non-Muslims, as was then usual elsewhere for the non-Muslim subjects (ahl adh-dhimma) per the Islamic law (Sharia), states Wink.

Yohanan Friedmann however finds that the Chach Nama holds that most contemporary religious as well as political authorities collaborated with the invaders, and those who promptly surrendered were not only gifted with huge sums of money but also entrusted to rule conquered territories. Friedmann also notes that bin-Qasim "gave his unqualified blessing to the characteristic features of the society"—he reappointed every deposed Brahmin (of Brahmanabad) to their jobs, exempted them from jizya, allowed holding of traditional festivals, and granted protection to temples but enforced the caste-hierarchy with enhanced vigor, drawing from Sharia, as evident from his treatment of Jats. Overall, Friedmann concludes that the conquest, as described in the Chach Nama, did "not result in any significant changes in the structure of Indian society".

According to Johnson and Koyama, quoting Bosworth, there were "certainly massacres in the towns" in the early stages of campaign against Hindus in Sind, but eventually they were granted dhimmi status and peace treaties were made with them.

After the conquest of Sindh, Qasim chose the Hanafi school of Islamic law which stated that, when under Muslim rule, people of Indic religions such as Hindus, Buddhists, and Jains are to be regarded as dhimmis (from the Arab term) as well as "People of the Book" and are required to pay jizya for religious freedom.

The historicity of the Chach Nama has been questioned. Francesco Gabrieli considers the Chach Nama to be a "historical romance" which was "a late and doubtful source" for information about bin-Qasim and must be carefully sieved to locate the facts; on such a reading, he admired bin-Qasim's proclamations concerning "principle of tolerance and religious freedom". Peter Hardy takes a roughly similar stance and lenses the work as a work of "political theory". Manan Ahmed Asif criticizes the very premises of recovering portions of the Chach Nama as a historical chronicle of Muslim conquest; he argues that the site and times of production dictated its entire content, and that it must be read in entirety, as an original work in the genre of "political theory" where history is creatively extrapolated with romantic fiction to gain favor in the court of Nasiruddin Qabacha. Wink states that some scholars treat the Chach Nama and other Muslim texts of its era, as "largely pseudo-history". He concurs that the skepticism about each individual source is justified and the Chach Nama is part fiction. Wink adds, taken together the common elements in these diverse sources suggest that Hindus were treated as dhimmis and targeted for certain discriminatory measures prescribed in the Sharia, as well as entitled to protection and limited religious freedoms in a Muslim state.

=== Early sultanates (11th–12th century) ===
Muslim texts of that period are replete with iconoclast rhetoric, descriptions of mass-slaughter of Hindus, and repeats ad nauseam about "the army of Islam obtain[ing] abundant wealth and unlimited riches" from the conquered sites. The Hindus are described in these Islamic texts as infidels, Hindustan as war zone ("Dar-al-Harb"), and attacks on Hindus as a part of a holy war (jihad), states Peter Jackson. However, states Wink, this killing was not systematic and "was normally confined to the fighting men" though the wars and episodes of routine violence did precipitate a great famine with civilian casualties in tens of thousands. The pervasive and most striking feature of the Arabic literature on Sind and Hind of the 11th to 13th century is its constant obsession with idol worship and polytheism in the Indian subcontinent. There is piecemeal evidence of iconoclasm that began in Sind region, but the wholesale and more systematic onslaught against major Hindu religious monuments is evidenced in North India.

Richard Eaton, Sunil Kumar, Romila Thapar, Richard H. Davis and others argue that these iconoclastic actions were not primarily driven by religious zeal, but were politically strategic acts of destruction in that temples in medieval India were sites associated with sovereignty, royal power, money, and authority. According to Wink, the iconoclasm was a product of "religious, economic and political" and the practice undoubtedly escalated due to the "vast amount of immobilized treasure" in these temples. As the Indo-Islamic conquests of the 11th and 12th centuries moved beyond Panjab and the Himalayan foothills of the northwest into the Ganges-Yamuna Doab region, states Andre Wink, "some of the most important sacred sites of Indian culture were destroyed and desecrated," and their broken parts consistently reused to make Islamic monuments. (Note: Some of the evidence of desecration and destruction of Hindu sacred monuments is independent of the Muslim texts of the period. It is found in Islamic monuments built during this period. As examples, the Qutb mosque in Delhi shows its "reliance on disassembled temple materials", as do the Caurasi Kambha mosque near Bharatpur, the Jami Masjid at Sultankot (also called Ukha mandir mosque), the 'idgah in Bayana.) Phyllis Granoff notes that "medieval Indian religious groups faced a serious crisis as invading Muslim armies sacked temples and defaced sacred image".

The 11th and 12th centuries additionally witnessed the rise of irregulars and then Banjara-like groups who adopted Islam. These were "marauding bands" who caused much suffering and destruction in the countryside as they searched for food and supplies during the violent campaign of Ghurids against Hindustan. The religious icons of Hindus were one of the targets of these Islamic campaigns.

The 11th- to 13th-century period did not witness any systematic attempts at forced conversions of Hindus into Muslims, nor is there evidence of widespread Islamicization in al-Hind that emerged from the violent conquest. The political power shifted from Hindu kings to Muslim sultans in conquered areas. If some temples were not destroyed in these areas, it did result in a loss to Hindu temple building patronage and an uprooting of Hindu sacred geography.

The second half of the 13th century witnessed raids on Hindu kingdoms by Muslim forces controlling the northwest and north India, states Peter Jackson. These did not lead to sustained persecution of the Hindus in the targeted kingdoms, because the Muslim armies merely looted the Hindus, took cattle and slaves, then left. The raids caused suffering, yet also rallied the Islamic believers and weakened a Hindu kingdom by weakening its prince's standing among his Hindu subjects. These raids were into Rajput kingdoms, those in central India, Lakhnawti–Awadh, and in eastern regions such as Bihar.

Numerous Islamic texts of that era, states Wink, also describe "forced transfer of enslaved Indian captives (ghilman-o-jawari, burda, sabaya), specially women and children" over the 11th century from Hindustan.

=== Delhi Sultanate (13th–16th century) ===
The Delhi Sultanate started in the 13th century and continued through the early 16th century, when the Mughal conquest replaced it. Jackson states that the Delhi sultans of this period saw themselves first and foremost as Islamic rulers for the "people of Islam". They were emphatically not "sultan of the Hindus". The Muslim texts of the Delhi Sultanate era treated Hindus with disdain, remarking "Hindus are never interesting in themselves, but only as converts, as capitation tax payers, or as corpses". These medieval Muslim rulers were "protecting and advancing the Islamic faith", with two Muslim texts of this period remarking that the Sultan had a duty "eradicate infidelity and humiliate his Hindu subjects".

According to Jackson, some of the conquered Hindu subjects of the Delhi Sultanate served these Sultans were "doubtless usually slaves". These Hindus built the mosques of this era as well as developed the Indo-Islamic architecture, some served the court in roles such as treasurers, clerks, minting of new coins, and others. These Hindus were not persecuted, instead some were rewarded with immunities and tax exemptions. Additionally, captured Hindu slaves were added as infantry troops in the Sultanate's army for their campaign against other Hindu kingdoms. Some Sultans adopted Indian customs such as ceremonial riding of elephants by kings, thus facilitating the public perception of the new monarch. This suggest that the Sultans cultivated some Hindus to serve their aims, rather than indiscriminately persecute every Hindu.

In general, Hindu subjects of Delhi Sultanate were generally accepted as people with dhimmi status, not equal to Muslims, but "protected", subject to Jizya tax and with a list of restrictions. Early Sultans of the Delhi Sultanate exempted the Brahmins from having to pay Jizya, thus dividing the Hindus and placing the discriminatory tax burden entirely on the non-Brahmin strata of the Hindu society. Firuz Shah was the first to impose the Jizya on Brahmins, and wrote in his autobiography that countless Hindus converted to Islam when he issued the edict that conversion would release them of the requirement to pay Jizya. This discrimination against Hindus was in force in the latter half of the 14th century, though Jackson finds it difficult to establish if and how this was enforced outside of the major centers under Muslim control.

The Muslim commanders of Delhi Sultanate regularly raided Hindu kingdoms for plunder, mulct their treasuries and looted the Hindu temples therein, states Jackson. These conquests of Delhi Sultanate armies damaged or destroyed many Hindu temples. In a few instances, after the war, the Sultans let the Hindus repair and reconstruct their temples. Such instances, states Jackson, has been cited by the Indian scholar P.B. Desai as evidence of "striking degree of tolerance" by Muslim Sultans. But, this happened in frontier areas after they had recently been conquered and placed in direct Muslim rule, where the Sultan's authority was "highly precarious". Within regions that was already under firm control of the Delhi Sultanate, the direct evidence of this is meagre. One example referred to is of a claimed request from the king of China to build a temple in India, as recorded by Ibn Battuta. Jackson states that it is questionable and has no corroborating evidence. Similar few examples near Delhi, such as one for Sri Krishna Bhagwan temple, cannot be verified whether they were ever built either.

Some modern era Indian texts mention that Hindu and Jain temples of Delhi Sultanate era received endowments from Muslim authorities, presenting these as evidence of lack of persecution during this period. It is "not beyond the bounds of possibility" that in some instances this happened. But generally, the texts and even the memoirs written by the some Sultans themselves describe how they "set about destroying new temples and replacing them with mosques", and in one case depopulated a town of Hindus and resettled Muslims there. Jackson clarifies that the evidence suggests that the destroyed temples were "new temples", and not the old one's near Delhi whose devotees were already paying regular Jizya to the Sultan's treasuries. In some cases, the policies on destroying or letting Hindus worship in their old temples changed as Sultans changed.

The Muslim nobles and advisors of the Sultans championed persecution of Hindus. Jackson shows how the Muslim texts of that era frequently mention themes such as the Hindu "infidels must on no account be allowed to live in ease and affluence", they should not be treated as "Peoples of the Book" and the Sultan should "at least refrain from treating Hindus with honour or permitting idolatry in the capital". Failure to slaughter the Hindus has led to polytheism taking root. Another wazir while theoretically agreeing to these view, stated that this would not be practical given the small population of Muslims and such a policy should be deferred until Muslims were in a stronger position. If eradication of Hindus is not possible, suggested another Muslim official, then the Hindus should at least be insulted, disgraced and dishonored. These views were not exceptions, rather consistent with Islamic thinking of that era and are "commonly encountered in polemical writing against the infidel in different parts of the Islamic world at different times", states Jackson. This antagonism towards Hindus may have other general reasons, such as the fear of apostasy given the tendency of everyday Muslims to join in with Hindus as they celebrated their religious festivals. Further, the succession struggle after the death of a Sultan usually led to political maneuvering by the next Sultan, where depending on the circumstances, the victor championed either the orthodox segment of the Islamic clergy and jurists, or gave concessions to the Hindus and other groups for support when the Sultanate facing a military threat from outside.

=== Madurai Sultanate ===
The army of Ala al-Din Khalji from Delhi Sultanate began their first campaign in 1310 against the Hindu kingdom in Madurai region – called Ma'bar by court historians, under the pretext of helping Sundar Pandya. According to Mehrdad Shokoohy – a scholar of Islamic studies and architectural history in Central and South Asia – this campaign lasted for a year during which Madurai and other Tamil region cities were overrun by the Muslims, the Hindu temples were demolished and the towns looted. A detailed record about the campaign by Amir Khusrau the destruction and plunder.

A second destructive campaign was launched by Mubarak Shah, Ala al-Din Khalji's successor. While the looted wealth was sent to Delhi, a Muslim governor was appointed for the region. The governor later rebelled, founded the short lived Madurai Sultanate and renamed himself as Sultan Ahsan Shah in 1334. The successive sultans of the new Sultanate did not have the support of the regional Hindu population. The Madurai Sultanate's army, states Shokoohy, "often exercised fierce and brutal repressive methods on the local people". The Sultanate faced constant battles with neighboring Hindu states and assassination by its own nobles. Sultan Sikandar Shah was the last sultan. He was killed by the invading forces of Vijayanagara Empire army in 1377.

The Muslim literature of this period record the motive of the Madurai Sultans. For example, Sultan Shams al-Din Adil Shah's general is described as leaving for "holy war against the infidels and taking from them great wealth and a vast amount of booty". Another record states, "he engaged in a holy war (ghaza) and killed a great number of infidels". Madurai region has several Islamic shrines with tombs built during this period, such as one for Ala al-Din and Shams al-Din. In this shrine, the inner columns are irregular and vary in form showing evidence of "reused material". The "destruction of temples and the re-use of their materials", states Shokoohy, was a "practice of the early Sultanates of North India, and we may assume that this tradition was brought to the south by the sultans of Ma'bar".

Indologist Crispin Branfoot said that the Madurai Sultanate "sacked and desecrated Hindu temples throughout the Tamil country", and these were restored and reconsecrated for worship by the Vijayanagara rulers.

=== Mughal Empire ===
==== Akbar ====
The Mughal emperor Akbar has been a celebrated unusual example of tolerance. Indologist Richard M. Eaton writes that from Akbar's time to today, he has attracted conflicting labels, "from a strict Muslim to an apostate, from a free-thinker to a crypto-Hindu, from a Zoroastrian to a proto-Christian, from an atheist to a radical innovator". As a youth, states Eaton, Akbar studied Islam under both Shia and Sunni tutors, but as an adult he looked back with regret on his early life, confessing that in those days he had "persecuted men into conformity with my faith and deemed it Islam". In his later years he felt "an internal bitterness, acknowledging that his soul had been 'seized with exceeding sorrow'" for what he had done before launching his campaign to "treat all Mughal subjects, regardless of religion, on a basis of legal equality before the state".

==== Aurangzeb ====
Aurangzeb (1658-1707) is a controversial figure in modern India, often remembered as a "vile oppressor of Hindus". During his rule Aurangzeb expanded the Mughal Empire, conquering much of southern India through long bloody campaigns against non-Muslims. He also re-introduced the jizya, a tax on non-Muslims, which had been suspended for the previous 100 years by his great-grandfather Akbar.

Aurangzeb ordered the desecration and destruction of temples when conquering new lands and putting down rebellions, punishing political leaders by destroying the temples that symbolized their power. In 1669 he issued orders to all his governors of provinces to "destroy with a willing hand the schools and temples of the infidels, and that they were strictly enjoined to put an entire stop to the teaching and practice of idolatrous forms of worship". According to Eaton these orders appear to have been directed not toward Hindu temples in general, but towards a more narrowly defined "deviant group". The number of Hindu temples destroyed or desecrated under Aurangzeb's rule is unclear and subject to scholarly debate. (Note: Number of temples destroyed: * Avari (2013, p. 115) citing a 2000 study, writes "Aurangzeb was perhaps no more culpable than most of the Sultans before him; they desecrated the temples associated with Hindu power, not all temples. It is worth noting that, in contrast to the traditional claim of hundreds of Hindu temples having been destroyed by Aurangzeb, a recent study suggests a modest figure of just fifteen destructions." * Truschke (2017, p. 85): "Nobody knows the exact number of temples demolished or pillaged on Aurangzeb's orders, and we never will. Richard Eaton, the leading authority on the subject, puts the number of confirmed temple destructions during Aurangzeb's rule at just over a dozen, with fewer tied to the emperor's direct commands. Other scholars have pointed out additional temple demolitions not counted by Eaton, such as two orders to destroy the Somanatha Temple in 1659 and 1706 (the existence of a second order suggests that the first was never carried out). Aurangzeb also oversaw temple desecrations. For example, in 1645 he ordered mihrabs (prayer niches, typically located in mosques) erected in Ahmedabad's Chintamani Parshvanath Temple, built by the Jain merchant Shantidas. Even adding in such events, however, to quote Eaton, "the evidence is almost always fragmentary, incomplete, or even contradictory". Given this, there were probably more temples destroyed under Aurangzeb than we can confirm (perhaps a few dozen in total?), but here we run into a dark curtain drawn across an unknown past." In contrast, the historian Abraham Eraly estimates Aurangzeb era destruction to be significantly higher; "in 1670, all temples around Ujjain were destroyed"; and later, "300 temples were destroyed in and around Chitor, Udaipur and Jaipur" among other Hindu temples destroyed elsewhere in campaigns through 1705.) Some suggest he may have built more temples than he destroyed. According to Ikram, "Aurangzeb tried to enforce strict Islamic law by ordering the destruction of newly built Hindu temples. Later, the procedure was adopted of closing down rather than destroying the newly built temples in Hindu localities. It is also true that very often the orders of destruction remained a dead letter." Some temples were destroyed entirely; in other cases mosques were built on their foundations, sometimes using the same stones. Idols in temples were smashed, and the city of Mathura was temporarily renamed as Islamabad in local official documents.

The persecution during the Islamic period targeted non-Hindus as well. (Note: Avari writes, "Aurangzeb's religious policy caused friction between him and the ninth Sikh guru, Tegh Bahadur. In both Punjab and Kashmir the Sikh leader was roused to action by Aurangzeb's excessively zealous Islamic policies. Seized and taken to Delhi, he was called upon by Aurangzeb to embrace Islam and, on refusal, was tortured for five days and then beheaded in November 1675. Two of the ten Sikh gurus thus died as martyrs at the hands of the Mughals.) In some cases, such as towards the end of Mughal era, the violence and persecution was mutual. Hindus too attacked and damaged Muslim tombs, even when the troops had orders not to harm religious refuges of Muslims. These "few examples of disrespect for Islamic sites", states Indologist Nicholas Gier, "pale in comparison to the great destruction of temples and general persecution of Hindus by Muslims for 500 years". Sources document brutal episodes of persecution. Sikh texts, for example, document their "Guru Teg Bahadur accompanying sixteen Hindu Brahmins on a quest to stop Mughal persecution of Hindus; they were arrested and commanded to convert to Islam on pain of torture and death", states Gier, "they all refused, and in November 1675, Mati Das was sawed in half, Dayal Das was boiled alive, Sati Das was burned alive, and Teg Bahadar was beheaded."

According to Deepa Ollapally, the Mughal emperor Aurangzeb was clearly discriminatory towards Hindu and all other non-Muslims, displaying an "unprecedented level of religious bigotry", but perhaps this was a consequence of the opposition he faced from a number of his family members. During the medieval span, she states, "episodes of direct religious persecution of Hindus were rare", as were communal riots between Hindus and Muslims.

Authorities on pre-Modern India, like Eaton, claim that even though Aurangzeb destroyed temples, available records show it was a little more than a dozen and not thousands, as has been widely believed, and that this was done for political, not religious reasons. The emperor also extended safety and security to people from all religions.

=== Historiography and distortion ===
According to Nicholas Gier, there were harmonious Hindu-Muslim relations in most Indian communities, and the Indian population grew during the medieval Muslim times. No populations were expelled based on their religion by either the Muslim or Hindu kings, nor were attempts made to annihilate a specific religion.

According to Romila Thapar, with the onset of Muslim rule all Indians, higher and lower caste were lumped together in the category of "Hindus". While higher-caste Indians regarded lower castes to be impure, they were now regarded as belonging to a similar category, which partly explains the belief among many higher caste Indians ".. belief among many upper caste Hindus today that Hinduism in the last one thousand years has been through the most severe persecution that any religion in the world has ever undergone." Thapar further notes that "The need to exaggerate the persecution at the hands of the Muslim is required to justify the inculcation of anti-Muslim sentiments among the Hindus of today."

Thapar states that the belief in a severe persecution in the last millennium brushes away the "various expressions of religious persecution in India prior to the coming of the Muslims and particularly between the Śaiva and the Buddhist and Jaina sects". She questions what persecution means, and if it means religious conversions, she doubts that conversions can be interpreted as forms of persecution. According to Thapar, it is quite correct to mention that Muslim iconoclasts destroyed temples and the broke images of Hindus but it should also be mentioned that Muslim rulers made donations to Hindu sects during their rule.

As part of the scholarly debate on Indian historiography, K. S. Lal, K. Seshadri and André Wink have criticized Marxian historians for using negationism to whitewash some of the atrocities committed by Muslim rulers.

The Hindutva approach to historiography has been accused of saffronising history, by minimizing or outright excluding the contributions Muslim rulers to Indian society, with the Bharatiya Janata Party (BJP) being accused of saffronising school textbooks that they deemed to have overt Marxist or Eurocentric political overtones. Meenakshi Jain has been criticized for being inducted as a historian despite being trained as a sociologist in service of saffronisation. Her Medieval India was criticized as being a monoscopic clash-of-civilizations narrative between the forces of good (Hindus) and evil (Muslims), and as having portrayed the exactions of the Sultanate rulers and the Mughals as anti-Hindu acts, with all of their contributions to the social, cultural and political ignored. Journalist François Gautier, who is an advocate of Hindutva, has framed the Muslim violence against Hindu expressions of faith as a "Hindu Holocaust".

== European colonial rule ==
=== Portuguese Goa ===
During the Portuguese rule of Goa, several Hindus were coerced into accepting Christianity by the passage of laws that made it difficult for them to practice their faith (such as the ban on the practice of sati) or harassement under pretences or petty complaints. Other Hindus, especially the upper caste Bamonns and Chardos were convinced to accept Christianity by offering favourable status to converts (indiacatos) and mestiços in terms of laws and jobs. An Inquisition - which literally means a period of prolonged and intensive questioning, was established in 1560 by Portuguese officials in the Estado Português da Índia. The Goa Inquisition was directed against backsliding New Christians (that is, former Hindus and Muslims who had recently converted to Christianity), and it has been recorded that around 57 Goan Catholics were executed over a period of two hundred and fifty years, starting in the year 1560. The inquisition was proposed by St. Francis Xavier, to ensure that the new converts were aware about the aspects of Christianity.

According to Prakashchandra Pandurang Shirodkar, Hindus faced some persecution along with some fortitude under the Portuguese in Goa. Vicar general Miguel Vaz had written to the king of Portugal in 1543 from Goa requesting that the Inquisition be established in Goa as well. Three years later, St. Francis Xavier made a similar request in view of the Muslims in the region and some New Christians abandoning their faith. On hearing of the excesses of the Inquisition in Goa, Lourenco Pires, Portuguese ambassador at Rome, expressed his displeasure to the crown while warning that this zeal for religion was actually becoming a disservice to God and the kingdom. Again according to Shirodkar, the Inquisition led to the downfall of the Portuguese Empire in the east.

=== British India ===
Muslim and Hindu communities in British India have lived in a delicate balance since the end of Muslim rule. Violent clashes have often appeared, and the partition of India in 1947 has only perpetuated these confrontations.

==== Mappila Riots (1921) ====
The Malabar Rebellion of 1921 is often considered as the culmination of Mappila riots. When the government refused to entertain demands of Khilafatists, some Muslims to turned their anger towards Hindus. The first major incident of religious violence was reportedly the Moplah rebellion in August 1921, it was widely narrated that the rebellion ended in large-scale violence against Hindu officials in Malabar. Mappilas committed several atrocities against the Hindus during the outbreak.

==== Noakhali riots ====
In 1946, around seven weeks after Direct Action Day (in which both Muslims and Hindus were targeted in communal attacks), violence was directed against the Hindu minority in rural Noakhali district and Tippera. Rioting in the region began in the Ramganj police station area. The rioting spread to the neighbouring police station areas of Raipur, Lakshmipur, Begumganj and Sandip in Noakhali and Faridganj, Hajiganj, Chandpur, Laksham and Chudagram in Tippera. From 2 October, there were instances of stray killings. Relief operations took place and Gandhi visited the area on a peace mission even as threats against the Hindus continued. While claims varied, the official Muslim League Bengal Government estimates of those killed were placed at a conservative 200. According to Huseyn Shaheed Suhrawardy, 9,895 people were forcibly converted in Tippera alone. Ghulam Sarwar Hossain, a religious leader who belonged to a local political party dominated by Muslims, was the main organiser of the riot. According to political scientist Bidyut Chakrabarty, Hindus widely believed that the local administration had planned the riot and that the police helped Ghulam Sarwar escape arrest. A large number of victims were Namasudra (a Bengali Hindu lower caste). According to a source quoting from the State Government Archives, in Naokhali 178 Hindus and 42 Muslims were killed while in Tippera 39 Hindus and 26 Muslims were killed. Women were abducted and forced into marriage.

In retaliation, Muslims were massacred in Bihar and in Garhmukteshwara in the United Provinces. These attacks began between 25 and 28 October 1946 in the Chhapra and Saran districts of Bihar and then spread to Patna, Munger, Bhagalpur and a large number of scattered villages of Bihar. The official estimates of the dead at that time were 445.

==== Partition of India ====
Hindus, Muslims, Sikhs, and members of other religious groups, experienced severe dislocation and violence during the massive population exchanges associated with the partition of India, as members of various communities moved to what they hoped was the relative safety of an area where they would be a religious majority. Hindus were among the between 200,000 and a million who died during the rioting and other violence associated with the partition.

===== Mirpur massacre and Rajouri massacre =====
The 1947 Mirpur massacre and the 1947–1948 Rajouri massacre of Hindus and Sikhs in the Jammu division of the former princely state of Jammu and Kashmir, began in November 1947, some months after the Partition of India. The Rajouri massacre ended in early 1948, when Indian troops retook the town of Rajouri.

== Present-day South Asia ==
=== India ===
Post 1947, especially after the 1980s, there have been a number of attacks on Hindu temples and Hindus by Muslim militants in India. Prominent among them are the 1998 Chamba massacre, the 2002 fidayeen attacks on Raghunath temple, the 2002 Akshardham Temple attack allegedly perpetrated by Islamic terrorist outfit Lashkar-e-Taiba, resulting in many deaths and injuries.

The Godhra train burning on 27 February 2002 killed 59 people, including 25 women and 15 child Hindu pilgrims. In 2011, the judicial court convicted 31 people saying the incident was a "pre-planned conspiracy". This event eventually led to escalation into the 2002 Gujarat riots.

On 2 May 2003, eight Hindus were killed by a Muslim mob at Marad beach in Kozhikode district, Kerala. One of the attackers was also killed. The judicial commission that probed the incident concluded that members of several political parties were directly involved in planning and executing the killing. The commission affirmed "a clear communal conspiracy, with Muslim fundamentalist and terrorist organisations involved". The courts sentenced 62 Muslims to life imprisonment for committing the massacre in 2009.

==== Punjab ====
From the mid-1980s to the mid-1990s, there was an armed campaign by the militants of the Khalistan Movement for a separate Sikh state, and in this period of insurgency, there were many incidents of targeted killings of Hindus by the militants. There were multiple killings of Hindu bus passengers by the pro-Khalistan militants in the 1980s. Major incidents included the Moga Massacre where 25 Hindus were killed. Lalru massacre of 38 Hindu bus passengers on 6 July 1987, by the Khalistan Commando Force militants near Lalru, Punjab, India.; and Fatehabad bus killings on 7 July 1987, in which 34 Hindus on two buses were killed. In most of these incidents, the attackers shot the Hindu passengers using automatic rifles.

According to the former Chief Minister of Punjab, Captain Amarinder Singh, there were 35,000 Hindus killed during militancy in Punjab. From K.P.S Gill's figures no more than 4,500 Hindus died in militancy. The data from court cases of the Supreme Court of India gives a lower death toll for Hindus at 3,817.

==== Jammu and Kashmir ====
The Kashmiri Pandit population living in the Muslim-majority region of Jammu and Kashmir has often come under threat from Islamic militants in recent years. Historian Ramachandra Guha has argued that the rise in Islamic militant activity in Kashmir and the rise of Hindu nationalism in the rest of India "began independently, yet each legitimized and furthered the other". This threat has been pronounced during periods of unrest in the Kashmir valley, such as in 1989. In 1986, the Anantnag Riots broke out, where protesters targeted properties of Kashmiri Hindus and temples. Along with the Hindus, large sections of the Muslim population have also been attacked, ostensibly for "cooperating" with the Indian state. Some authors have found evidence that these militants had the support of the Pakistani security establishment. The incidents of violence included the Wandhama Massacre in 1998, in which 23 Kashmiri Hindus were gunned down by Muslims disguised as Indian soldiers. Many Kashmiri Non-Muslims have been killed and thousands of children orphaned over the course of the conflict in Kashmir. The 2000 Amarnath pilgrimage massacre was another such incident where 30 Hindu pilgrims were killed en route to the Amarnath Temple.

In the Kashmir region, approximately 300 Kashmiri Pandits were killed between September 1989 and 1990 in various incidents. In early 1990, local Urdu newspapers Aftab and Al Safa called upon Kashmiris to wage jihad against India and ordered the expulsion of all Hindus choosing to remain in Kashmir. In the following days masked men ran in the streets with AK-47 shooting to kill Hindus who would not leave. Notices were placed on the houses of all Hindus, telling them to leave within 24 hours or die.

As of 2005, it is estimated that between 250,000 and 300,000 Kashmiri Pandits have migrated outside Kashmir since the 1990s due to persecution by Islamic fundamentalists. The proportion of Kashmiri Pandits in the Kashmir valley has declined from about 15% in 1947 to, by some estimates, less than 0.1% since the insurgency in Kashmir took on a religious and sectarian flavour.

Many Kashmiri Pandits have been killed by Islamist militants in incidents such as the Wandhama massacre and the 2000 Amarnath pilgrimage massacre.

In October 2021, three terrorists shot a Kashmiri pandit school teacher and a Sikh school principal after checking their identity cards and segregating them from their Kashmiri Muslim colleagues in a government run school. Pakistan-based Lashkar-e-Taiba affiliated TRF claimed responsibility of the killings.

In the 2025 Pahalgam attack, five armed terrorists killed 26 civilians, mainly targeting Hindu tourists. TRF initially claimed responsibility, but later denied involvement.

=== Bangladesh ===
According to the United States Commission on International Religious Freedom (USCIRF), Hindus are among those persecuted in Bangladesh, with hundreds of cases of "killings, attempted killings, death threats, assaults, rapes, kidnappings, and attacks on homes, businesses, and places of worship" on religious minorities in 2017. The 'Vested Property Act' previously named the 'Enemy Property Act' has seen up to 40% of Hindu land get snatched away forcibly. Hindu temples in Bangladesh have also been vandalised.

There have been several instances where Hindu refugees from Bangladesh have stated that they were the victims of torture and intimidation. A US-based human rights organisation, Refugees International, has claimed that religious minorities, especially Hindus, still face discrimination in Bangladesh.

The second-largest party, Bangladesh Jamaat-e-Islami, openly calls for 'Talibanisation' of the state. Journalist Hiranmay Karlekar, writing in 2005 when Jamaat was part of the coalition government, described Talibanisation as impossible to stop, but said the country was not on the brink of it, and the overwhelming majority of society would fight against it tooth and nail.

Bangladeshi feminist Taslima Nasrin's 1993 novel Lajja deals with the anti-Hindu riots and anti-secular sentiment in Bangladesh in the wake of the Demolition of the Babri Masjid in India. The book was banned in Bangladesh, and helped draw international attention to the situation of the Bangladeshi Hindu minority.

In October 2006, the USCIRF published a report titled "Policy Focus on Bangladesh", which said that since its last election, "Bangladesh has experienced growing violence by religious extremists, intensifying concerns expressed by the countries religious minorities". The report further stated that Hindus are particularly vulnerable in a period of rising violence and extremism, whether motivated by religious, political or criminal factors, or some combination. The report noted that Hindus had multiple disadvantages against them in Bangladesh, such as perceptions of dual loyalty with respect to India and religious beliefs that are not tolerated by the politically dominant Islamic Fundamentalists of the Bangladesh Nationalist Party. Violence against Hindus has taken place "in order to encourage them to flee in order to seize their property". On 2 November 2006, USCIRF criticised Bangladesh for its continuing persecution of minority Hindus. It also urged the Bush administration to get Dhaka to ensure protection of religious freedom and minority rights before Bangladesh's next national elections in January 2007.

On 6 February 2010, Sonargaon temple in Narayanganj district of Bangladesh was destroyed by Islamic fanatics. Five people were seriously injured during the attack. Temples were also attacked and destroyed in 2011.

In 2013, the International Crimes Tribunal indicted several Jamaat members for war crimes against Hindus during the 1971 Bangladesh genocide. In retaliation, violence against Hindu minorities in Bangladesh was instigated by the Bangladesh Jamaat-e-Islami. The violence included the looting of Hindu properties and businesses, the burning of Hindu homes, rape of Hindu women and desecration and destruction of Hindu temples.

On 28 February 2013, the International Crimes Tribunal sentenced Delwar Hossain Sayeedi, the Vice President of the Jamaat-e-Islami to death for the war crimes committed during the 1971 Bangladesh Liberation War. Following the sentence, activists of Jamaat-e-Islami and its student wing Islami Chhatra Shibir attacked the Hindus in different parts of the country. Hindu properties were looted, Hindu houses were burnt into ashes and Hindu temples were desecrated and set on fire. While the government has held the Jamaat-e-Islami responsible for the attacks on the minorities, the Jamaat-e-Islami leadership has denied any involvement. The minority leaders have protested the attacks and appealed for justice. The Supreme Court of Bangladesh has directed the law enforcement to start suo motu investigation into the attacks. US Ambassador to Bangladesh express concern about attack of Jamaat on Bengali Hindu community. The violence included the looting of Hindu properties and businesses, the burning of Hindu homes, rape of Hindu women and desecration and destruction of Hindu temples. According to community leaders, more than 50 Hindu temples and 1,500 Hindu homes were destroyed in 20 districts.

According to the BJHM report in 2017 alone, at least 107 people of the Hindu community were killed and 31 fell victims to enforced disappearance 782 Hindus were either forced to leave the country or threatened to leave. Besides, 23 were forced to get converted into other religions. At least 25 Hindu women and children were raped, while 235 temples and statues vandalized during the year. The total number of atrocities happened with the Hindu community in 2017 is 6474. During the 2019 Bangladesh elections, eight houses belonging to Hindu families on fire in Thakurgaon alone.

In April 2019, two idols of Hindu goddesses, Lakshmi and Saraswati, were vandalized by unidentified miscreants at a newly constructed temple in Kazipara of Brahmanbaria. In the same month, several idols of Hindu gods in two temples in Madaripur Sadar upazila which were under construction were desecrated by miscreants.

In October 2021 several Hindu temples, including an ISKCON center and homes belonging to Hindu community, across Bangladesh were vandalized and set on fire by a Muslim mob of over 10,000 protesters, and clashes were reported in at least 10 of the 64 districts, after an allegation of a Quran being placed on the lap of Hanuman during the Durga Puja religious ceremony. In Haziganj Upazila at least 4 were killed and 24 injured when police opened fire on a mob trying to attack the local temple there. According to Gobinda Chandra Pramanik, the secretary-general of the Bangladesh National Hindu Mahajote, at least 17 temples had been attacked and more than 100 people had been wounded. Shibu Prasad Roy, member of the organizing committee of the Durga Puja festival, says, "At first 15 to 20 people, aged between 14 and 18 years old, came to attack our temple in Cumilla. After that, the number increased to hundreds of people." Various reports suggests that the growing attack against the Hindu minority community in Bangladesh has been partly fueled by misinformation spread through social media. Asif Nazrul mentions that, hundreds of homes belonging to the Hindu community were burned due to a fake Facebook post alleging an insult to Islam by a Hindu in 2016, including a few dozen Buddhist temples destroyed by a Muslim mob in Cox's Bazar after a rumor circulated that a Buddhist had insulted the Quran. A report by The Economic Times alleged that, Jamaat-e-Islami were behind the attacks.

The cohorts of the ruling party Awami League and Chhatra League are often found affiliated in such attacks on Hindu communities followed by communal violence. Even in most of the cases officials found them masterminds behind the attacks to achieve political advantages.

As per a written response to parliament by Indian Minister of State for External Affairs Kirti Vardhan Singh, a total of 2,200 cases of violence against Hindus and other minorities have been reported in Bangladesh in 2024 till December 8.

Since 1951, the Hindu population has decreased by 15.1% in 71 years, and during the same period, the Muslim population increased by exactly the same 15.1% (76% to 91.1%). Percentage of Hindus declined more than two third (over 67% drop) in 71 years, i.e. from 22% of total population of Bangladesh in 1951 to 13.5% in 1974 (8.5% decrease in 20 years), and then to drop again to 6.9% in 2022 (further 1.6% decrease). Hindus and others have been regularly and systematically persecuted, such as during the Bangladesh genocide, Bangladesh Liberation War and numerous recurring massacres of civilians where rape is also used as a weapon. Active perpetrators of genocide, ethnic cleansing and rapes of Hindus in Bangladesh include the Pakistani Military, Al Badr, Al Sham, East Pakistan Central Peace Committee, Razakars, Muslim League, Jamaat-e-Islami, and the Urdu-speaking Biharis.

=== Pakistan ===
==== 1971 Bangladesh genocide ====
During the 1971 Bangladesh genocide there were widespread killings and acts of ethnic cleansing of civilians in Bangladesh (then East Pakistan, a province of Pakistan), and widespread violations of human rights were carried out by the Pakistani Army, which was supported by political and religious militias during the Bangladesh Liberation War. The violence began on 26 March 1971 with the launch of Operation Searchlight, as West Pakistan (now Pakistan) began a military crackdown on the eastern wing (now Bangladesh) of the nation. During the nine-month-long Bangladesh War for Liberation, members of the Pakistani military and supporting pro Pakistani Islamist militias from Jamaat-e-Islami party killed between 200,000 and 3,000,000 people and raped between 200,000 and 400,000 Bengali women, according to Bangladeshi and Indian sources, in a systematic campaign of genocidal rape. The actions against women were supported by Pakistan's religious leaders, who declared that Bengali women were gonimoter maal (Bengali for "public property"). As a result of the conflict, a further eight to ten million people, mostly Hindus, fled the country to seek refuge in neighbouring India. It is estimated that up to 30 million civilians were internally displaced out of 70 million. During the war, there was also ethnic violence between Bengalis and Urdu-speaking Biharis. Biharis faced reprisals from Bengali mobs and militias and from 1,000 to 150,000 were killed.

In Bangladesh, the atrocities are identified as a genocide. Time magazine reported in 1971 that "the Hindus, who account for three-fourths of the refugees and a majority of the dead, have borne the brunt of the Muslim military's hatred."

United States government cables noted that Hindus were specific targets of the Pakistani army. Notable massacres included the Jathibhanga massacre, the Chuknagar massacre, and the Shankharipara massacre. More than 60% of the Bengali refugees who fled to India were Hindus. It has been alleged that this widespread violence against Hindus was motivated by a policy to purge East Pakistan of what was seen as Hindu and Indian influences.

The genocide and gendercidal atrocities were also perpetrated by lower-ranking officers and ordinary soldiers. These "willing executioners" were fueled by an abiding anti-Bengali racism, especially against the Hindu minority. According to R.J. Rummel, late professor of political science at the University of Hawaii,

Bengalis were often compared with monkeys and chickens. Said Pakistan General Niazi, "It was a low lying land of low lying people." The Hindus among the Bengalis were as Jews to the Nazis: scum and vermin that [should] best be exterminated. As to the Moslem Bengalis, they were to live only on the sufferance of the soldiers: any infraction, any suspicion cast on them, any need for reprisal, could mean their death. And the soldiers were free to kill at will. The journalist Dan Coggin quoted one Punjabi [Pakistani] captain as telling him, "We can kill anyone for anything. We are accountable to no one." This is the arrogance of Power.

The Bangladesh Liberation War (1971) resulted in one of the largest genocides of the 20th century. While estimates of the number of casualties was 3,000,000, it is reasonably certain that Hindus bore a disproportionate brunt of the Pakistan Army's onslaught against the Bengali population of what was East Pakistan. An article in Time magazine dated 2 August 1971, stated "The Hindus, who account for three-fourths of the refugees and a majority of the dead, have borne the brunt of the Muslim military hatred." Senator Edward Kennedy wrote in a report that was part of United States Senate Committee on Foreign Relations testimony dated 1 November 1971, "Hardest hit have been members of the Hindu community who have been robbed of their lands and shops, systematically slaughtered, and in some places, painted with yellow patches marked "H". All of this has been officially sanctioned, ordered and implemented under martial law from Islamabad". In the same report, Senator Kennedy reported that 80% of the refugees in India were Hindus and according to numerous international relief agencies such as UNESCO and World Health Organization the number of East Pakistani refugees at their peak in India was close to 10 million. Given that the Hindu population in East Pakistan was around 11 million in 1971, this suggests that up to 8 million, or more than 70% of the Hindu population had fled the country. The Pulitzer Prize–winning journalist Sydney Schanberg covered the start of the war and wrote extensively on the suffering of the East Bengalis, including the Hindus both during and after the conflict. In a syndicated column "The Pakistani Slaughter That Nixon Ignored", he wrote about his return to liberated Bangladesh in 1972. "Other reminders were the yellow "H"s the Pakistanis had painted on the homes of Hindus, particular targets of the Muslim army" (by "Muslim army", meaning the Pakistan Army, which had targeted Bengali Muslims as well), (Newsday, 29 April 1994).

==== Post-1971 ====
The Hindus are a persecuted minority religion in Pakistan. Militancy and sectarianism has been rising in Pakistan since the 1990s, and religious minorities such as Hindus have "borne the brunt of the Islamist's ferocity", suffering "greater persecution than in any earlier decade", according to Farahnaz Ispahani. This has led to attacks and forced conversion of Hindus.

The London-based Minority Rights Group and Islamabad-based International and Sustainable Development Policy Institute state that religious minorities in Pakistan such as Hindus face "high levels of religious discrimination", and "legal and social discrimination in almost every aspect of their lives, including political participation, marriage and freedom of belief". Similarly, the Brussels-based Unrepresented Nations and Peoples Organization stated in 2019, that "religious minorities, including Hindus ... have perpetually been subjected to attacks and discrimination by extremist groups and the society at large."

The United States Commission on International Religious Freedoms (USCIRF) echos a similar view, stating that "extremist groups and societal actors [have] continued to discriminate against and attack religious minorities" in Pakistan. The European Parliament, similarly has expressed its concerns to Pakistan of systemic persecution of minorities citing examples of attack on Hindu temples (and Christian churches), hundreds of honor killings, citing its blasphemy laws that "make it dangerous for religious minorities to express themselves freely or engage openly in religious activities". The European Parliament has adopted resolutions of concern stating that "for years Pakistan's blasphemy laws have raised global concern because accusations are often motivated by score-settling, economic gain or religious intolerance, and foster a culture of vigilantism giving mobs a platform for harassment and attacks" against its religious minorities such as Hindus.

In the aftermath of the Babri Masjid demolition Pakistani Hindus faced riots. Mobs attacked five Hindu temples in Karachi and set fire to 25 temples in towns across the province of Sindh. Shops owned by Hindus were also attacked in Sukkur. Hindu homes and temples were also attacked in Quetta.

Hindus in Pakistan are often treated as second class citizens, systematically discriminated against and dehumanised. Hindu women have also been known to be victims of kidnapping and forced conversion to Islam. A member of the Human Rights Commission of Pakistan claimed in 2010, though without official record, that around 20 to 25 girls from the Hindu community, along with people from other minorities like Christians, are abducted every month and forcibly converted. Many Hindus are continuing to flee Pakistan even now due to persecution. Krishan Bheel, a Hindu member of the National Assembly of Pakistan, came into the news for manhandling Qari Gul Rehman after being taunted with a religious insult.

On 18 October 2005, Sanno Amra and Champa, a Hindu couple residing in the Punjab Colony, Karachi, Sindh returned home to find that their three teenage daughters had disappeared. After inquiries to the local police, the couple discovered that their daughters had been taken to a local madrassah, had been converted to Islam, and were denied unsupervised contact with their parents. In January 2017, a Hindu temple was demolished in Pakistan's Haripur district.

In 2005, 32 Hindus were killed by shots fired from the government side near Nawab Akbar Bugti's residence during bloody clashes between Bugti tribesmen and paramilitary forces in Balochistan. The shooting left the Hindu residential locality near Bugti's residence badly hit.

In 2006, a Hindu temple in Lahore was destroyed to make way for construction of a multi-storied commercial building. When reporters from Pakistan-based newspaper Dawn tried to cover the incident, they were accosted by the henchmen of the property developer, who denied that a Hindu temple existed at the site. In January 2014, a policeman standing guard outside a Hindu temple at Peshawar was gunned down. 25 March 2014 Express Tribune citing an All Pakistan Hindu Rights Movement (PHRM) survey said that 95% of all Hindu temples in Pakistan have been converted since 1990. Pakistanis attack Hindu temples if anything happens to any mosque in neighbouring India. In 2019, a Hindu temple Pakistan's southern Sindh province was vandalism by miscreants and they set fire to holy books and idols inside the temple.

In July 2010, around 60 members of the minority Hindu community in Karachi were attacked and evicted from their homes following an incident of a Hindu youth drinking water from a tap near an Islamic mosque. In January 2014, a policeman standing guard outside a Hindu temple at Peshawar was gunned down. Pakistan's Supreme Court has sought a report from the government on its efforts to ensure access for the minority Hindu community to temples – the Karachi bench of the apex court was hearing applications against the alleged denial of access to the members of the minority community.

In 2010 also, 57 Hindus were forced to convert by their employer as his sales dropped after Muslims started boycotting his food items as they were prepared by Hindus. Since the impoverished Hindus had no other way to earn and needed to keep the job to survive, hence they converted.

A Pakistan Muslim League politician has stated that abduction of Hindus and Sikhs is a business in Pakistan, along with conversions of Hindus to Islam. Forced conversion, rape, and forced marriages of Hindu women in Pakistan have recently become very controversial in Pakistan.

Although Hindus were frequently soft targets in Pakistan, the rise of Taliban forces in the political arena has particularly unsettled the already fragile situation for the minority community. Increasing persecution, ostracism from locals and lack of a social support system is forcing more and more Hindus to flee to India. This has been observed in the past whenever the conflicts between the two nations escalated, but this has been a notable trend in view of the fact the recent developments are due to internal factors almost exclusively. The Taliban have used false methods of luring, as well as the co-operation of zealots within local authorities to perpetrate religious cleansing.

In 2012, a century-old temple demolished in Karachi, Pakistan, along with several houses, leaving nearly 40 Hindus homeless. Following the demolition, the Pakistan Hindu Council organised a protest outside of Karachi Press Club. Prakash, one of the members of the council said "They destroyed our mandir and humiliated our gods". According to local residents, the demolition team took away the gold jewellery and crowns of the Hindu deities. "They hit me with their guns when I tried to stop them. I told them to kill me instead of destroying our holy place", states, one of the residents, Lakshman. According to one elderly resident, identified as Kaali Das, the area around the temple had over 150 Hindu families and due to the demolition, the families, including the children, spent the nights in the open. "If you don't want us, we will go to India", screamed one of the women. Maharaj Badri, who lived inside the temple, said that, "Our ancestors have been living here since independence. We are not encroachers".

The rise of Taliban insurgency in Pakistan has been an influential and increasing factor in the persecution of and discrimination against religious minorities in Pakistan, such as Hindus, Christians, Sikhs, and other minorities. Hindu minorities living under the influence of the Taliban in Swat, Pakistan, were forced to wear red headgear such as turbans as a symbol of dhimmi. In January 2014, in an attack on a temple, the guard was gunned down.

Some Hindus in Pakistan feel that they are treated as second-class citizens and many have continued to migrate to India. According to the Human Rights Commission of Pakistan data, just around 1,000 Hindu families fled to India in 2013. In May 2014, a member of the ruling Pakistan Muslim League-Nawaz (PML-N), Dr Ramesh Kumar Vankwani, revealed in the National Assembly of Pakistan that around 5,000 Hindus are migrating from Pakistan to India every year.

Many Hindu girls living in Pakistan are kidnapped, forcibly converted and married to Muslims. According to the Pakistan Hindu Council, religious persecution especially forced conversions to remain the foremost reason for the migration of Hindus from Pakistan. Religious institutions like Bharchundi Sharif and Sarhandi Pir support forced conversions and are known to have support and protection of ruling political parties of Sindh. According to the National Commission of Justice and Peace and the Pakistan Hindu Council (PHC) around 1000 Christian and Hindu minority women are converted to Islam and then forcibly married off to their abductors or rapists. This practice is being reported increasingly in the districts of Tharparkar, Umerkot and Mirpur Khas in Sindh. According to the Amarnath Motumal, the vice chairperson of the Human Rights Commission of Pakistan, every month, an estimated 20 or more Hindu girls are abducted and converted, although exact figures are impossible to gather. In 2014 alone, 265 legal cases of forced conversion were reported mostly involving Hindu girls.

In September 2019, Hindu teacher was attacked and three Hindu temples were vandalised in Ghotki riots over blasphemy accusations. The protestors attacked properties, including the school and vandalised three Hindu temples. The Hindu principal of Sindh public school in Ghotki was accused of fake blasphemy and the school was vandalised by the religious extremists in the presence of police, states the reports.

In 2020, the Mata Rani Bhatiyani Hindu temple in Tharparkar, Sindh was vandalised. The vandals desecrated the idols and set fire to holy scriptures. Four teenagers, ages 12 and 15 years, have been arrested for theft of the cash collection box of the temple.

According to a report by Movement for Peace and Solidarity, every year, around 1,000 young Hindu girls, between the ages of 12 and 28, are abducted, forcibly married and converted to Islam.

In 2020, an Islamist mob desecrated the construction site of the first Hindu temple in Islamabad - Shri Krishna Temple Islamabad. Subsequently, the Pakistan government halted the construction of the temple and referred the issue to the Council of Islamic Ideology, a constitutional body set up to ensure compliance of state policy with Islamic Ideology. Punjab Assembly speaker Chaudhry Pervaiz Elahi, a member of Pakistan Muslim League - Quaid, stated that construction of the temple was " against the spirit of Islam". Jamia Ashrafia, a Lahore-based Islamic institution, issued a fatwa against the temple.

In October 2020, the goddess Durga's idols have been vandalised, stripped down and damaged in Nagarparkar, the Sindh Province of Pakistan. According to the reports, the incident happened after the Hindu community had performed prayers of the Hindu festival Navaratri. The incident has occurred on one of the most auspicious days in the Hindu religion, when communities come together to pray to and celebrate Durga.

In December 2020, a mob of hundred people led by the local Muslim clerics, destroyed and set on fire a Hindu temple in Karak district of Khyber Pakhtunkhwa, Pakistan. The violent mob, arranged by the local clerics, is seen setting on fire the walls and roof of the temple in the footage. According to the report, the rally was organised by Jamiat Ulema-e-Islam (F), a Sunni Deobandi political party in Pakistan, after the speakers delivered their fiery speeches, the crowd vandalized the temple and set it ablaze and razed it to the ground. Human rights activists based in Pakistan, and other parts of the world, condemned the violent act against the Hindu minority community.

In August 2021, a Muslim mob stormed and vandalized a Hindu temple in Rahim Yar Khan, Punjab, damaging and burning down the Hindu idols at the Siddhi vinayak temple. According to Ramesh Kumar Vankwani, the member of Hindu National Assembly, the situation in the city was tense following the desecration of the Hindu temple. The negligence of the issue by the local police, states Vankwani, was very shameful. An appeal was made to the chief justice of Pakistan to intervene and to take immediate action, states Vankwani. "The attackers were carrying sticks, stones and bricks. They smashed the deities while raising religious slogans", said Vankwani.

In June 2023, the Pakistan Higher Education Commission banned the celebration of the Hindu festival Holi on institute campuses to preserve "Islamic identity" and "sociocultural values" which raised the issue of religious discrimination in the country.

=== Sri Lanka ===
Theravada Buddhism has been the preeminent religion in Sri Lanka throughout its history since it was first established on the island in the 3rd century BCE and forms an integral part of the Sinhalese ethnic identity. The state and the Sangha (Buddhist clergy) have maintained a close and reciprocal relationship, with the legitimacy of kingship being conferred only on Buddhists for the purpose of protecting Buddhism. Consequently, Buddhism is given "the foremost place" in the country's constitution, making it the duty of the state to protect and foster it. Other groups perceived as posing threat to this rightful position of Buddhism on the island have come into conflicts with the Buddhist majority led by the Sangha.

==== Background ====
Sinhalese-Buddhist nationalism has its roots in the mytho-historical accounts of the 5th century CE Pali chronicle Mahavamsa composed by a Buddhist monk to glorify Buddhism and Buddhist rulers on the island. The chronicle portrays the island as having been blessed by the Buddha to be the repository of his religion and the ancestors of the Sinhalese as having been entrusted to be its custodians. This has led to the widely held Sinhalese-Buddhist belief that the island is Sihadipa (island of the Sinhalese) and Dhammadipa (the island ennobled to preserve and propagate Buddhism). The chronicle also legitimizes violence for the sake of safeguarding Buddhism. In a popular story often invoked by modern nationalists, it narrates an account of the Buddhist prince Dutthagamani and his army of Buddhist monks battling and defeating the Tamil ruler Ellalan in order to restore Buddhist rule over the island. When Dutthagamani laments over the many Tamils he has killed, the arahants (Buddha's enlightened disciples) advise him that no real sin has been committed by him since he has killed only unbelievers who were not more to be esteemed than beasts.

The Sangha has historically expressed hostility toward Hinduism which they depicted as a heretical or a false faith and the Tamils figure as the main unbelievers and enemies of Buddhism. According to the scholar Edmund Leach, "the Holy War which defends the Buddhist Sangha against Hindu-Tamil encroachment is the most basic of all Sinhalese nationalist traditions."

The Hindu temples destroyed by the King Mahasena in the 3rd century CE in order to establish the doctrine of the Buddha were said to have been those of the unbelievers. The 12th century CE rulers Vikramabahu I and his successor Gajabahu II were denied royal consecration by the Sangha on the basis of their Hindu faith since kingship on the island was reserved for Buddhists for the purpose of protecting Buddhism. In the context of the destructive impacts on Buddhist brought by Magha, the Hindu invader from Kalinga who seized power in Polonnaruwa in the 13th century CE, the Buddhist chronicle Culavamsa charges him with the spreading of false faith. The Pujavaliya composed in the aftermath of Magha's invasion declares that the unbelievers will never have permanent residence on the island reserved for Buddhism and that it is only suitable for Buddhist rulers. The increasing influence of Hinduism on the island starting from the 13th century CE was resisted by the Sangha who decried the worship of Hindu gods and ridiculed Hindu customs such as wearing the sacred ash. Leading Buddhist monks conspired to assassinate the King Kirti Sri Rajasinha of South Indian origin in 1760 on the basis that he was a "heretical Tamil" who refused to give up Hindu practices such as wearing the sacred ash.

==== Colonial period ====
Under Portuguese colonial rule in the 16th century, the Hindu population of the Jaffna kingdom was subjected to forced conversion to Catholicism and reportedly 500 Hindu temples, including the principal one at Nallur, were destroyed. Other prominent Hindu temples outside Jaffna, such as Koneswaram in Trincomalee, which till then had been a famous shrine for foreign pilgrims, and Munneswaram in Puttalam, were also destroyed.

==== Post-independence ====
In the modern period, religious minorities have been targeted for hate campaign and violence by Sinhalese-Buddhist nationalist groups. Most notably the ethnic conflict between the Sinhalese Buddhists and the mainly Hindu Tamils has had a significant religious dimension with majority of the Sangha advocating a military solution. Tamil Hindu temples and sacred sites have been targeted for acts of destruction, desecration and appropriation and the Hindu priests and devotees have been targeted for acts of violence by Sinhalese-Buddhist nationalists since Sri Lanka's independence.

When another series of anti-Tamil riots broke out in the post-independent Ceylon in 1958 to which the politically active monks had contributed, a Sinhalese mob after failing to set fire to the Panadura Hindu temple burned alive its officiating priest in a notable incident. The LTTE leader Prabhakaran from a Hindu background cited this incident as one of the catalysts for his turn toward militancy. In another outbreak of anti-Tamil riots in 1977, Hindu temples came under attack on a massive scale. On 19 August, a large Sinhalese mob descended upon the Sri Kathiresan Temple in Mawanella, shouting that the Hindu priests should be killed and all Hindu temples should be converted into Buddhist temples. The Chief Priest fled the assault but the mob damaged the idols inside and set fire to the temple. Hindu temples in Galgamuwa, Galaha, Kegalle, Katugastota, Matara, Ukkuwela and Udupihilla were also damaged and looted or burned. It's estimated that no less than 50 Hindu temples were attacked throughout the island.

There were also instances of institutional discrimination against Hindus by the state. In 1968 the committee set up to declare the precincts of the famous Koneswaram Temple in Trincomalee as a Hindu sacred area was suspended by the government at the behest of the Buddhist monk Dambagasare Sumedhankara who claimed the site as an ancient place of Buddhist worship, whereas the same monk was able to successfully petition the government to declare Seruvila in the same district as a Buddhist sacred city in 1979.

During the 1981 anti-Tamil violence in Jaffna, policemen vandalized and set fire to a Hindu temple. More Hindu temples came under attacks with over 50 being damaged during the watershed anti-Tamil pogrom in 1983, in which Buddhist monks also led rioters exhorting the Sinhalese to kill all Tamils. Cyril Mathew, a leading militant Buddhist nationalist and the Minister of Industries, played a key role in organizing the pogrom, which resulted in the deaths and displacement of thousands of Tamils, sparking the Sri Lankan Civil War. Mathew had been conducting a virulent anti-Tamil campaign, publishing inflammatory pamphlets such as the one calling on the Sinhalese to "Protect the Buddhist Faith". He had revived and propagandized polarizing accounts contained in the Buddhist chronicle, notably the devastation brought upon Buddhism by the invasion of Kalinga Magha and his Tamil soldiers, and applied them to contemporary ethnic relations. Thus, he had paved the way for the violence through such writings and speeches. A few months before the pogrom, he had met up with the head monk at a Buddhist temple in Panadura and produced a map of purported Buddhist sites in Tamil areas, accusing the Tamils of having destroyed Sinhalese Buddhist culture. Mathew also led a plan to establish Buddhist monasteries and colonies in Tamil areas by reclaiming former Buddhist sites which he alleged had been converted into Hindu shrines. To implement such projects, he had enlisted Sri Lankan Army personnel who removed Hindu statues and chased away the local Tamil villagers.

==== Civil war ====
With the beginning of the Sri Lankan civil war in 1983, attacks on Hindu temples by the majority Buddhist Sri Lankan security forces escalated, with the soldiers occupying, plundering, desecrating and ejecting priests and devotees from some temples such as the famous Thirukketheeswaram Temple in Mannar. In October 1990 the Sri Lankan Air Force repeatedly bombed and damaged the famous Naguleswaram temple in Jaffna, also killing and injuring many Tamil devotees. In a 1998 letter to the UNESCO, the Hindu Religious Priest Organisation of North East Province complained that more than 1,800 Hindu temples in the North Eastern Province had been "destroyed or rendered unfit for worship" since the war began. The Department of Hindu Affairs estimated that 1,479 Hindu temples had been damaged in eight districts of the North Eastern Province between 1983 and December 1990.

Muslim mobs also attacked Hindu temples during the conflict. During the anti-Tamil violence in Karaitivu in April 1985 orchestrated by the Sri Lankan security forces, Muslim mob said to be members of the Jihad group entered the sanctum sanctorum of the ancient Kannagi Amman temple and removed the golden image of the goddess Pattini and burned a part of the temple. They also broke the idols of surrounding temples devoted to other Hindu deities. Other Hindu temples were also petrol-bombed and their valuables removed. The broken walls of the damaged temples were painted with the Islamic phrase "Allahu Akbar". Overall, six Hindu temples were damaged by fire and pillaged. The Bhadrakali temple in Akkaraipattu was demolished by a Muslim mob in 1990 with the tacit sanction from the security forces and was desecrated with its well being filled with cattle bones.

The Hindu priests have also been subject to persecution by the state, with them being arrested, having their sacred thread removed, being beaten and detained as LTTE suspects. A Hindu priest named Barmasiri Chandraiyer Ragupathi Sharma who has been detained since 2000 under the draconian Prevention of Terrorism Act was subjected to degrading treatment in police custody. His sacred thread was cut and he was fed meat and alcohol against his religious beliefs. He was also tortured with a barbed wire pipe being inserted into his rectum and his genitals being slammed in a drawer. In 2008 Sivakururaja Kurukkal, chief priest of the Koneswaram Temple, was shot dead in Trincomalee by state-affiliated forces. The priest had led the revival of the district's Hindu heritage against the latest spate of state-sponsored Buddhist encroachment and defended the human rights of Tamils.

==== Post-war ====
In the post-war period with a triumphant Sinhalese-Buddhist nationalism and Tamil areas under heavy military occupation, there has been an increased drive to change the Tamil Hindu identity of contested sites into Sinhalese Buddhist in a process that has been termed "Buddhisization". Military personnel have spearheaded the construction of Buddhist shrines throughout Tamil Hindu areas with no Buddhist population, symbolizing the assertion of Sinhalese-Buddhist domination. The Sangha has used the backing of the military and the Department of Archaeology to claim Hindu sites as former Buddhist sites in order to build Buddhist shrines and viharas in their place, stoking longstanding Tamil fears of Sinhalese colonization. Tamil Hindu clergy and laity objecting to such encroachments have been threatened and assaulted. Hindu worshippers engaging in festival rituals to their shrines located at sites contested by Buddhist clergy have been assaulted and arrested by the police. In 2012 the All Ceylon Hindu Council complained to the government about its inaction against the construction of Buddhist viharas on the sites of destroyed Hindu temples.

There have also been renewed attacks on Hindu temples. In the southern town of Dambulla, the Bhadrakali Amman Temple was demolished and the image of its deity desecrated by members of the Sangha and lay Buddhists in 2013 after calls from the head monk of the local Rangiri Dambulu Viharaya for its removal since it was within a designated Buddhist sacred area. Condemning the recent destruction and appropriation of a Ganesha temple site to make way for a Buddhist stupa in Trincomalee and recalling earlier such incidents in the district, the Association of Hindu Priests in Muttur aired the wider Tamil Hindu grievances in May 2019: "After the end of war, not only Tamil habitations but also Saivite temples are being destroyed and encroached on. We are saddened by the fact that it is some Buddhist monks who are leading the efforts to destroy Saivite and Tamil history."

=== Afghanistan ===
According to Ashish Bose, a population research scholar, after the 1980s, Hindus (and Sikhs) became a subject of "intense hate" with the rise of religious fundamentalism in Afghanistan. Their "targeted persecution" triggered an exodus and forced them to seek asylum. Many of the persecuted Hindus started arriving in and after 1992 as refugees in India. While these refugees were mostly Sikhs and Hindus, some were Muslims. However, India has historically lacked any refugee law or uniform policy for persecuted refugees, state Ashish Bose and Hafizullah Emadi.

Under the Taliban regime, sumptuary laws were passed in 2001 which forced Hindus to wear yellow badges in public in order to identify themselves as such. Hindu women were forced to dress according to Islamic hijab, ostensibly a measure to "protect" them from harassment. This was part of the Taliban's plan to segregate "un-Islamic" and "idolatrous" communities from Islamic ones. In addition, Hindus were forced to wear yellow distinguishing marks. However, after some protests Taliban abandoned this policy.

The decree was condemned by the Indian and United States governments as a violation of religious freedom. In the United States, the chairman of the Anti-Defamation League Abraham Foxman compared the decree to the practices of Nazi Germany, where Jews were required to wear labels which identified them as Jews. The comparison was also drawn by California Democrat and Holocaust survivor Tom Lantos, and New York Democrat and author of the bipartisan 'Sense of the Congress' non-binding resolution against the anti-Hindu decree Eliot L Engel.

Since the 1990s, many Afghan Hindus have fled the country, seeking asylum in countries such as Germany.

== Outside South Asia ==
=== Malaysia ===
Approximately nine percent of the population of Malaysia are Tamil Indians, of whom nearly 90 percent are practising Hindus. Indian settlers came to Malaysia from Tamil Nadu in the late 19th and early 20th centuries. Between April and May 2006, several Hindu temples were demolished by city hall authorities in the country, accompanied by violence against Hindus. On 21 April 2006, the Malaimel Sri Selva Kaliamman Temple in Kuala Lumpur was reduced to rubble after the city hall sent in bulldozers.

The president of the Consumers Association of Subang and Shah Alam in Selangor State has been helping to organise efforts to stop the local authorities in the Muslim dominated city of Shah Alam from demolishing a 107-year-old Hindu temple. The growing Islamization in Malaysia is a cause for concern to many Malaysians who follow minority religions such as Hinduism. On 11 May 2006, armed city hall officers from Kuala Lumpur forcefully demolished part of a 60-year-old suburban temple that serves more than 1,000 Hindus. The "Hindu Rights Action Force", a coalition of several NGO's, have protested these demolitions by lodging complaints with the Malaysian Prime Minister. Many Hindu advocacy groups have protested what they allege is a systematic plan of temple cleansing in Malaysia. The official reason given by the Malaysian government has been that the temples were built "illegally". However, several of the temples are centuries old. According to a lawyer for the Hindu Rights Action Task Force, a Hindu temple is demolished in Malaysia once every three weeks.

In response to the proposed construction of a temple in Selangor, Muslims chopped off the head of a cow to protest, with leaders saying there would be blood if a temple was constructed in Shah Alam.

Laws in the country, especially those concerning religious identity, are generally slanted towards compulsion into converting to Islam.

=== Myanmar ===
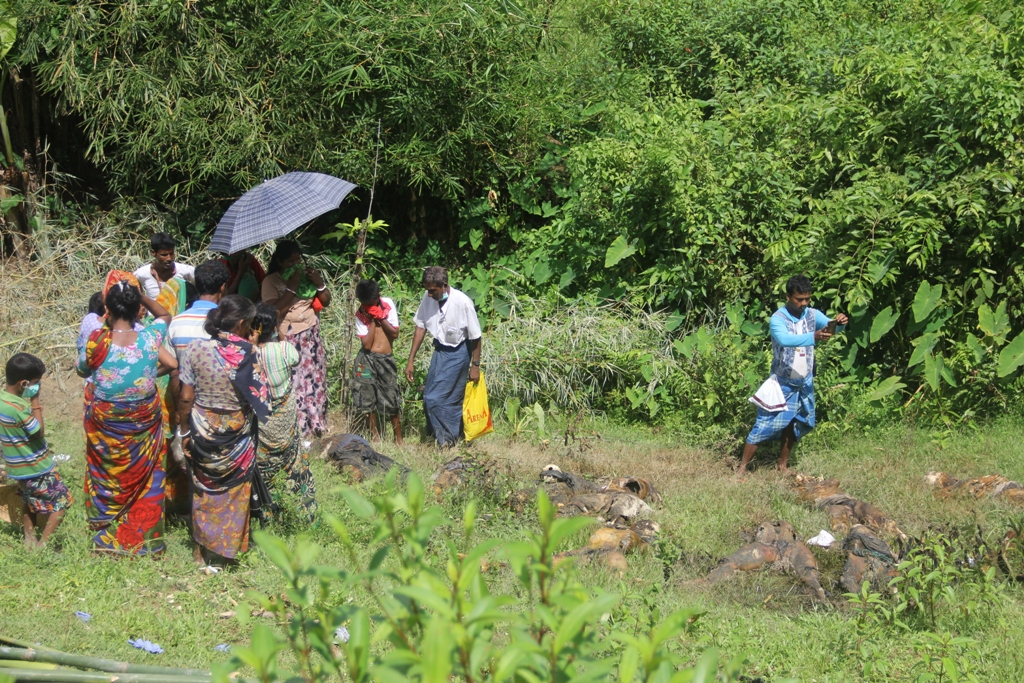
Hindu villagers gather to identify the corpses of family members who were killed in the Kha Maung Seik massacre.

On 25 August 2017, the villages in a cluster known as Kha Maung Seik in northern Maungdaw District of Rakhine State in Myanmar were attacked by Rohingya Muslims of Arakan Rohingya Salvation Army (ARSA).This was called Kha Maung Seik massacre. Amnesty International said that about 99 Hindus were killed in that day. Due to these, many Rohingya Hindus have started identifying themselves as Chittagonian Hindus rather than Rohingyas. In September 2017, India Today reported that mass graves with bodies of 45 Hindus had been found in Rakhine, and that Hindu Rohingyas faced forced conversions to Islam in Bangladeshi refugee camps at the hands of Muslim Rohingyas.

=== United States ===
Hindus constitute 0.7% of the total population of the United States. They are also the most affluent religious group. Hindus in the US enjoy both de jure and de facto legal equality. However, a series of threats and attacks were committed against people of Indian origin by a street gang called the "Dotbusters" in New Jersey in 1987. The name originated from the bindi traditionally worn on the forehead by Indian women.

In October 1987, a group of youths attacked Navroze Mody, an Indian man of Parsi origin, who was mistaken for a Hindu, after he had left the Gold Coast Cafe with his friend who fell into a coma. Mody died four days later. The four convicted of the attack were Luis Acevedo, Ralph Gonzalez and Luis Padilla – who were convicted of aggravated assault; and William Acevedo – who was convicted of simple assault. The attack was with fists and feet and with an unknown object that was described as either a baseball bat or a brick, and occurred after members of the group, which was estimated as being between ten and twelve youths, had surrounded Mody and taunted him for his baldness as either "Kojak" or "baldie". Mody's father, Jamshid Mody, later brought charges against the city and police force of Hoboken, New Jersey, claiming that "the Hoboken police's indifference to acts of violence perpetrated against Asian Indians violated Navroze Mody's equal protection rights" under the Fourteenth Amendment. Mody lost the case; the court ruled that the attack had not been proven a hate crime, nor had there been proven any malfeasance by the police or prosecutors of the city.

A few days after the attack on Mody, another Indian was beaten into a coma; this time on a busy street corner in Jersey City Heights. The victim, Kaushal Saran, was found unconscious at Central and Ferry Avenues, near a city park and firehouse, according to police reports. Saran, a licensed physician in India who was awaiting licensing in the United States, was discharged later from University Hospital in Newark. The unprovoked attack left Saran in a partial coma for over a week with severe damage to his skull and brain. In September 1992, Thomas Kozak, Martin Ricciardi, and Mark Evangelista were brought to trial on federal civil rights charges in connection with the attack on Saran. However, the three were acquitted of the charges in two separate trials in 1993. Saran testified at both trials that he could not remember the incident.

The Dotbusters were primarily based in New York and New Jersey and committed most of their crimes in Jersey City. Although tougher anti-hate crime laws were passed by the New Jersey legislature in 1990, the attacks continued, with 58 cases of hate crimes against Indians in New Jersey reported in 1991.

On 2 January 2012, a Hindu worship center in New York City was firebombed.

In late January 2019, an attack on the Swaminarayan Temple in Louisville, Kentucky, resulted in damage and anti-Hindu graffiti on the temple. A cleanup effort was later organised by the mayor to spread awareness of Hinduism and other hate crimes. An arrest of a 17-year-old was made for the hate crime days later.

=== Trinidad and Tobago ===
During the initial decades of Indian indenture, Indian cultural forms were met with either contempt or indifference by the Christian majority. Hindus have made many contributions to Trinidad's history and culture even though the state historically regarded Hindus as second class citizens. Hindus in Trinidad struggled over the granting of adult franchise, the Hindu marriage bill, the divorce bill, the cremation ordinance, and other discriminatory laws. After Trinidad's independence from colonial rule, Hindus were marginalised by the African-based People's National Movement. The opposing party, the People's Democratic party, was portrayed as a "Hindu group", and Hindus were castigated as a "recalcitrant and hostile minority". The displacement of PNM from power in 1985 would improve the situation.

Intensified protests over the course of the 1980s led to an improvement in the state's attitudes towards Hindus. The divergence of some of the fundamental aspects of local Hindu culture, the segregation of the Hindu community from Trinidad, and the disinclination to risk erasing the more fundamental aspects of what had been constructed as "Trinidad Hinduism" in which the identity of the group had been rooted, would often generate dissension when certain dimensions of Hindu culture came into contact with the State. While the incongruences continue to generate debate, and often conflict, it is now tempered with growing awareness and consideration on the part of the state to the Hindu minority. Hindus have been also been subjected to persistent proselytisation by Christian missionaries. Specifically the evangelical and Pentecostal Christians. Such activities reflect racial tensions that at times arise between the Christianized Afro-Trinidadian and Hindu Indo-Trinidadian communities.

=== Fiji ===
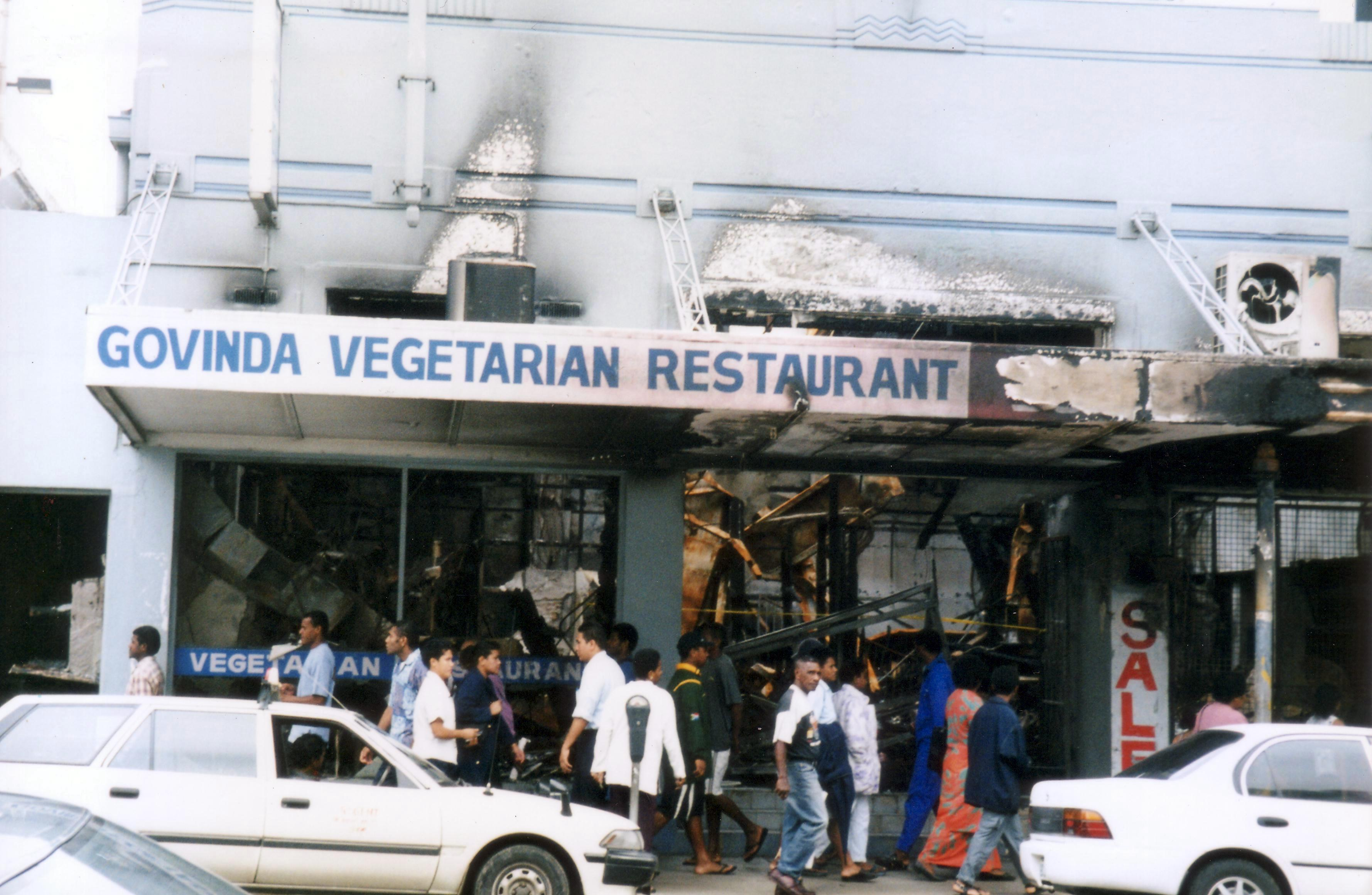
The burnt out remains of Govinda's Restaurant in Suva: over 100 shops and businesses were ransacked in Suva's central business district on 19 May

Hindus in Fiji constitute approximately 38% of the country's population. During the late 1990s there were several riots against Hindus by radical elements in Fiji. In the Spring of 2000, the democratically elected Fijian government led by Prime Minister Mahendra Chaudhry was held hostage by a guerilla group, headed by George Speight. They were demanding a segregated state exclusively for the native Fijians, thereby legally abolishing any rights the Hindu inhabitants have now. The majority of Fijian land is reserved for the ethnically Fijian community. Since the practitioners of Hindu faith are predominantly Indians, racist attacks by the extremist Fijian Nationalists too often culminated into violence against the institutions of Hinduism. According to official reports, attacks on Hindu institutions increased by 14% compared to 2004. Hindus and Hinduism, being labelled the "outside others", especially in the aftermath of the May 2000 coup, have been victimised by Fijian fundamentalist and nationalists who wish to create a theocratic Christian state in Fiji. This intolerance towards Hindus has found expression in anti-Hindu speeches and destruction of temples, the two most common forms of immediate and direct violence against Hindus. Between 2001 and April 2005, one hundred cases of temple attacks have been registered with the police. The alarming increase of temple destruction has spread fear and intimidation among the Hindu minorities and has hastened immigration to neighbouring Australia and New Zealand. Organised religious institutions, such as the Methodist Church of Fiji, have repeatedly called for the creation of a theocratic Christian State and have propagated anti-Hindu sentiment.

=== China ===
During the early 1930s, Hindu trading communities in southern Xinjiang, primarily originating from Shikarpur in Sindh, were subjected to violent persecution amid the establishment of the TIRET and the rise of the Bughra emirs. Following the expulsion of Swedish missionaries and the enforcement of Sharia in March 1933, Turkic Muslim rebels in Khotan killed several Hindus and looted their property. Uyghur men had harassed Hindu moneylenders, rioted against Hindu merchants who married Uyghur women, and attacked Hindu religious processions in towns such as Poskam and Yarkand during the late Qing and Republican periods. The tensions culminated in March 1933, when Uyghur rebels plundered the possessions of Hindu merchants in Karghalik and Keryia, killing nine in an incident later termed the “Karghalik Outrage.” Further killings occurred in Poskam and Khotan, with the victims’ valuables seized by the rebels. These massacres effectively destroyed the small Hindu diaspora that had resided in southern Xinjiang for decades as part of the broader Indian merchant network extending from British India into Central Asia.

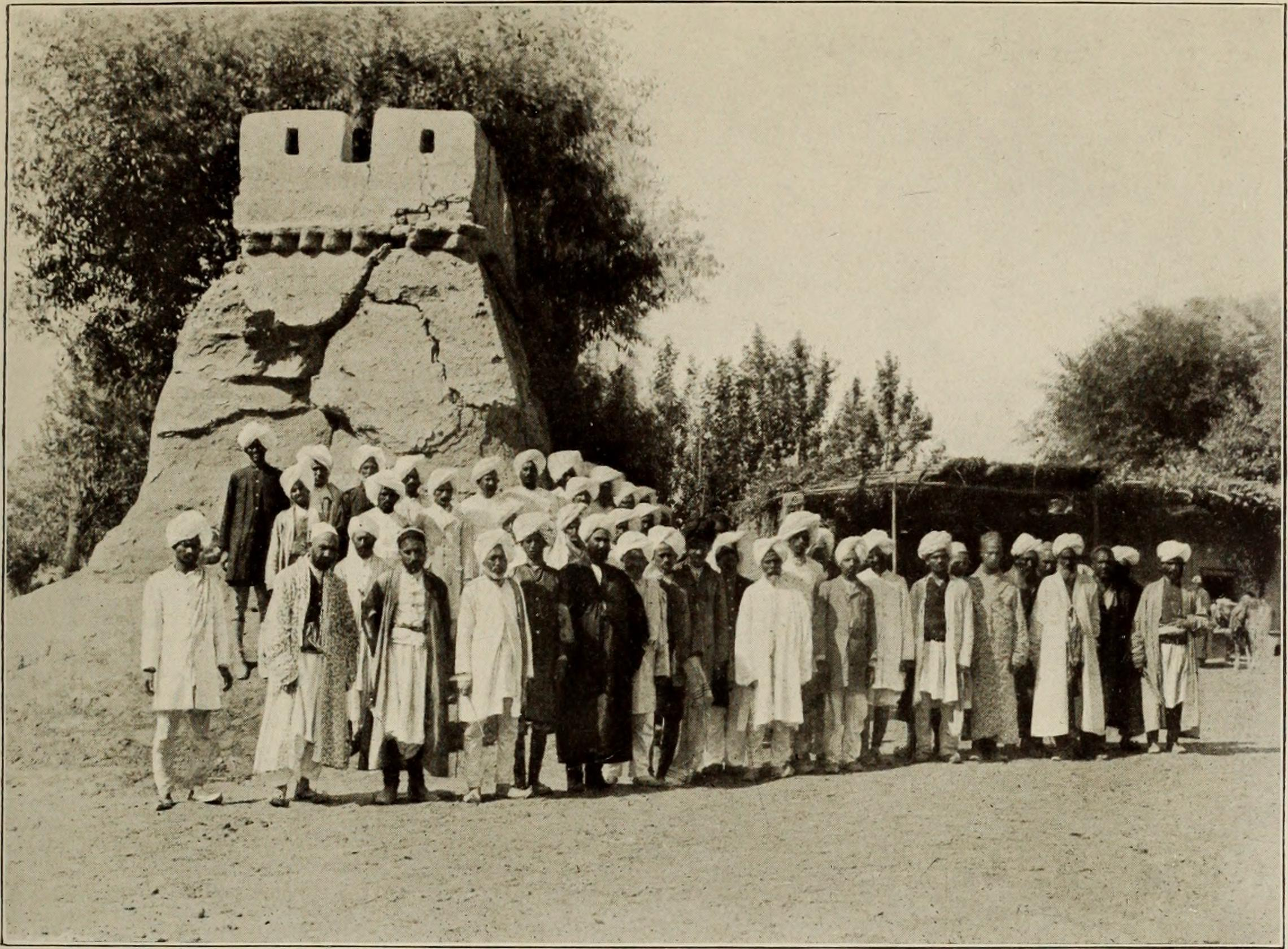
Pre-rebellion Hindu trading community near Yarkand, early 20th century

== See also ==
- Anti-Hindu sentiment
- Expulsion of Indians from Burma in 1962

== Sources ==
- Aquil, Raziuddin (2008). "On Islam and Kufr in the Delhi Sultanate". In Datta, Rajat (ed.). Rethinking a Millennium: Perspectives on Indian History from the Eighth to the Eighteenth Century. Aakar Books. ISBN 978-81-89833-36-7.
- Avari, Burjor (2013). Islamic Civilization in South Asia: A history of Muslim power and presence in the Indian subcontinent. Routledge. ISBN 978-0-415-58061-8.
- Batabyal, Rakesh (2005). Communalism in Bengal: From Famine To Noakhali, 1943-47. SAGE. ISBN 978-0-7619-3335-9.
- Chakrabarty, Bidyut (2004). Partition of Bengal and Assam, 1932–1947. Routledge. ISBN 978-1-134-33275-5.
- Chatterji, Joya (2002). Bengal Divided: Hindu Communalism and Partition, 1932–1947. Cambridge University Press. ISBN 978-0-521-52328-8.
- Codrington, H. W. (1926). A Short History Of Ceylon. London: Macmillan & Co.
- D'Costa, Bina (2011). Nationbuilding, Gender and War Crimes in South Asia. Routledge. ISBN 978-0-415-56566-0.
- de Silva, K. M. (1981). A History of Sri Lanka. University of California Press. ISBN 9780520043206.
- de Silva, K. M. (2005). A History of Sri Lanka. Colombo: Vijitha Yapa Publications. ISBN 9789558095928.
- DeVotta, Neil (2007). "Implications for Politics and Conflict Resolution in Sri Lanka". Sinhalese Buddhist Nationalist Ideology: Implications for Politics and Conflict Resolution in Sri Lanka. Washington (D. C.): East-West Center Washington. ISBN 978-1-932728-64-4.
- Eltayeb, Mohamed S.M. (2013). "A Human Rights Framework for Defining and Understanding Intra-Religious Persecution in Muslim Countries". In Ghanea-Hercock, Nazila (ed.). The Challenge of Religious Discrimination at the Dawn of the New Millennium. Springer. ISBN 978-94-017-5968-7.
- Emadi, Hafizullah (2014). "Minorities and marginality: pertinacity of Hindus and Sikhs in a repressive environment in Afghanistan". Nationalities Papers. 42 (2): 307–320. doi:10.1080/00905992.2013.858313. S2CID 153662810.
- Fraser, Bashabi (2008). Bengal Partition Stories: An Unclosed Chapter. Anthem Press. ISBN 978-1-84331-299-4.
- Ganguly, Sumit (2002). Conflict Unending: India-Pakistan Tensions Since 1947. Columbia University Press. ISBN 978-0-231-12369-3.
- Gier, Nicholas F. (2014). The Origins of Religious Violence: An Asian Perspective. Lexington Books. ISBN 978-0-7391-9223-8.
- Ikram, S. M. (1964). Embree, Ainslie (ed.). Muslim Civilization in India. Vol. 1. Columbia University Press. OCLC 409401 – via Frances W. Pritchett.
- Indrapala, K. (1969). "Early Tamil Settlements in Ceylon". The Journal of the Ceylon Branch of the Royal Asiatic Society of Great Britain & Ireland. 13. JSTOR: 43–63. JSTOR 43483465.
- Jackson, Peter (2003). The Delhi Sultanate: A Political and Military History. Cambridge University Press. ISBN 978-0-521-54329-3.
- Machado, Alan (1999). Sarasvati's Children: A History of the Mangalorean Christians. Bangalore: I.J.A. Publications. ISBN 978-81-87609-03-2.
- Neiminathan, M. (July 1998). Destruction of Hindu Temples in Tamil Eelam and Sri Lanka. Federation of Saiva (Hindu) Temples UK. OCLC 230179772.
- Ollapally, Deepa M. (2008). The Politics of Extremism in South Asia. Cambridge University Press. ISBN 978-0-521-87584-4.
- Saikia, Yasmin (2011). Women, War, and the Making of Bangladesh: Remembering 1971. Duke University Press. ISBN 978-0-8223-5038-5.
- Sajjad, Tazreena (2012) [First published 2009]. "The Post-Genocidal Period and its Impact on Women". In Samuel Totten (ed.). Plight and Fate of Women During and Following Genocide. Transaction Publishers. pp. 219–248. ISBN 978-1-4128-4759-9.
- Sharlach, Lisa (2000). "Rape as Genocide: Bangladesh, the Former Yugoslavia, and Rwanda". New Political Science. 22 (1): 89–102. doi:10.1080/713687893. S2CID 144966485.
- Shokoohy, Mehrdad (April 1991). "Architecture of the Sultanate of Ma'bar in Madura, and Other Muslim Monuments in South India". Journal of the Royal Asiatic Society. Third Series. 1 (1): 31–92. doi:10.1017/S1356186300000055. JSTOR 25182270. S2CID 163145743.
- Smith, Vincent A. (1919). The Oxford History of India. Oxford University Press. OCLC 839048936.
- Spencer, Philip (2012). Genocide Since 1945. Routledge. ISBN 978-0-415-60634-9.
- Truschke, Audrey (2017). Aurangzeb: The Life and Legacy of India's Most Controversial King. Stanford University Press. ISBN 978-1-5036-0257-1.
- Wink, André (1991). Al-Hind the Making of the Indo-Islamic World: Volume 2 –The Slave Kings and the Islamic Conquest 11th-13th Centuries. BRILL Academic. ISBN 90-04-10236-1.
- Wink, André (2002). Al-Hind, the Making of the Indo-Islamic World: Volume 1 – Early Medieval India and the Expansion of Islam 7th-11th Centuries. Brill. ISBN 978-0-391-04173-8.
