= Fonds de dotation de l'ICOM =

Museum fund endowment

The Fonds de dotation de l'ICOM (ICOM Endowment Fund of the International Council of Museums) was founded in 2013 and provided financial and operational support for activities of the organisation until December 2018. The ICOM Fund's actions had several objectives: improving the social value of museums, supporting innovation in museums, preserving heritage, implementing risk-reduction measures, strengthening professional skills, and capacity building. The executive director of the ICOM Endowment Fund was Björn Stenvers.
