= Tibet Museum (Dharamshala) =

Museum in Himachal Pradesh, India

Coordinates: 32.232587°N 76.324883°E

- བོད་ཀྱི་འགྲེམས་སྟོན་ཁང་།་ (Bod-kyi Demtonkhang)
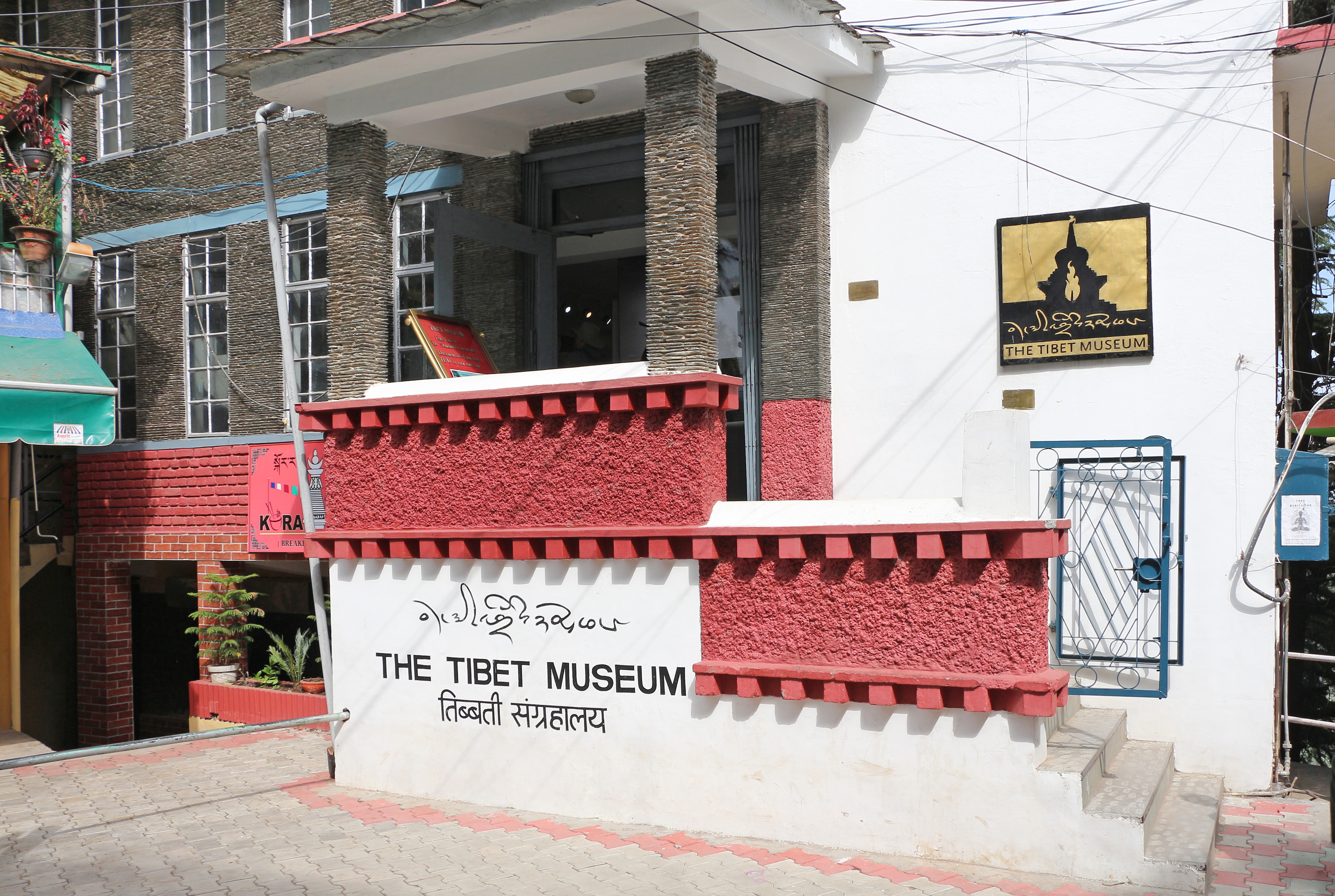
- Established: 5 October 1999
- Location: Dharamshala, India
- Collection size: Approx. 30,000 photographs

The Tibet Museum is the official museum of the Central Tibetan Administration's Department of Information and International Relations and is located IN CTA complex in T building, in the Dharamshala suburb of McLeod Ganj. The Tibet Museum aims to disseminate knowledge of Tibetan history and culture while raising awareness of the occupation of Tibet and the ongoing human rights abuses and environmental destruction committed by CCP China. Established in 1998, the Tibet Museum now has a collection comprising over 30,000 photographs, day-to-day life objects, a traveling exhibition, and a permanent exhibition that tell about Tibet identity by telling story through culture, history and struggle. Mainly new museum space exhibition title is I am Tibetan, this is my story which exhibition divided into 10 section each has cover Tibet identity and struggle.

The Tibet Museum's mission is to document, preserve, research, exhibit and educate the public on all matters related to the Tibetan history and culture. Initially named the Tibetan National Commemoration and Documentation Center, many different ideas were discussed before the final concept was agreed upon by the Central Tibetan Administration. On 30 April 2000, the 14th Dalai Lama inaugurated the museum in a ceremony attended by around 300 dignitaries and volunteers. The Tibet Museum presents Tibet's history and visions for its future through texts, photographs, videos and installations.
