= Pakistan Automotive Manufacturers Association =

- PAMA Logo
- Company type: Trade group
- Headquarters: Karachi, Pakistan
- Number of locations: Lahore; Islamabad
- Key people: Hirofumi Nagao (CEO); Saquib H. Shirazi
- Website: pama.org.pk

The Pakistan Automotive Manufacturers Association (PAMA) (Urdu: پاکستان موٹر گاڑی تولید کننده تنظیم) is a trade group of automobile manufacturers that operate in Pakistan.

It is the only trade association for the automobile industry in Pakistan.

== History ==
Pakistan Automotive Manufacturers Association (PAMA) was founded in 1994. It is licensed by the Ministry of Commerce under the Trade Organizations Ordinance 2007.

PAMA also serves as the central source of statistical data for the automotive industry.

== List of members ==
- Al-Ghazi Tractors
- Al Haj Faw
- Atlas Honda Motorcycles
- Crown Motor Company
- Dewan Farooque Motors
- DYL Motorcycles
- Fateh Motors
- Ghandhara Industries
- Ghandhara Nissan
- Ghani Automobile Industries
- Hinopak Motors
- Honda Atlas Cars
- Indus Motors Company
- Karakoram Motors
- Kausar Automobiles
- Master Motors
- Millat Tractors
- Omega Industries
- Pak Suzuki
- Plum Qingqi Motors
- Raazy Motors Industries
- Orient Automotive
- Sazgar
- Sigma Motors
- Sohrab Cycles
- Super Asia Motors
- United Motorcycles
- Volvo Pakistan
- Yamaha Motor Pakistan

== See also ==
- Automobile industry in Pakistan
