= Automotive industry in Pakistan =

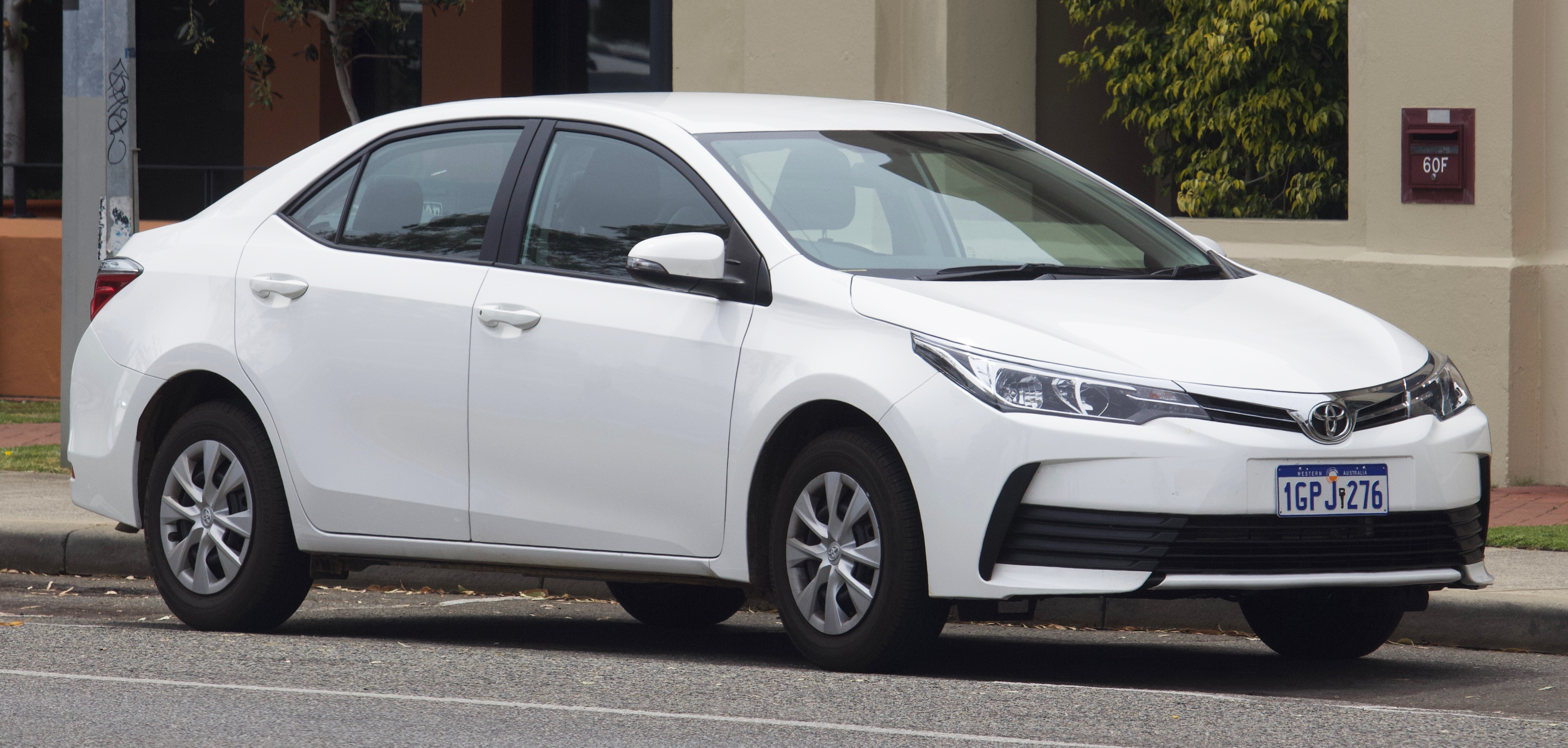
Toyota Indus's Corolla is the most assembled car in Pakistan. In 2017, 52,874 models were made.

The automotive industry in Pakistan is one of fastest-growing industries in the country, growing by 171% between 2014 and 2018. It accounts for 7% of Pakistan's GDP and employed a workforce of over 6.8 million people as of 2024. Pakistan is the 15th largest producer of automobiles. Its contribution to the national exchequer is nearly US$5.4 billion. Pakistan's auto market is among the fastest growing in Asia. In the 1990s and early 2000s, Pakistan had many Japanese cars. With the launch of the first Auto Policy in 2005, Pakistan launched its first indigenous car, Adam Revo. However, after the 2008 elections, the dollar started depreciating, and due to bad governance, many automakers began to halt production, with some exiting Pakistan. Currently, the auto market is dominated by Honda, Toyota, Haval, Hyundai, Kia and Suzuki. However, on 19 March 2016, Pakistan passed a second "Auto Policy 2016-21," which offers tax incentives to new automakers to establish manufacturing plants in the country. In response, Renault, Nissan, Proton Holdings, Kia, SsangYong, Volkswagen, FAW, and Hyundai have expressed interest in entering the Pakistani market. MG JW Automobile Pakistan has signed a memorandum of understanding with Morris Garages (MG) Motor UK Limited, owned by SAIC Motor, to bring electric vehicles to Pakistan. NLC signed an agreement with Mercedes-Benz to manufacture Mercedes Actros trucks in Pakistan. On 8 July 2021, Jolta Electric launched the production of electric motorcycles.

On 26 December 2021, the Government of Pakistan announced a five-year policy between 2021 and 2026 to raise the production capacity of automobiles in Pakistan. On 20 October 2020, during a meeting with 50 Chinese automotive brands, the Pakistani envoy to China said that Pakistan will increase its automobile production to 6-8 million units in the next five years. Pakistan is building special economic zones where Chinese companies will be able to set up their businesses. In that meeting, 10 Chinese and Nasal automotive companies prepared to invest in Pakistan.

== History ==
=== Early years (1950–1969) ===
Pakistan produced its first vehicle in 1953 at the National Motors plant in Karachi. The plant opened in conjunction with General Motors, which arranged facilities for the production of Vauxhall cars and Bedford trucks. Later, they assembled cars, buses, and light trucks. In the same year, Ford trucks partnered with Ali Automobiles, where they introduced the Ford Anglia, Ford pickups, and the Ford Kombi. Exide Pakistan also began the domestic production of car batteries in 1953. Haroon Industries partnered with Dodge Motors in 1956. Haroon Industries also partnered with Skoda company to assemble Skoda 1000MB from the kit. Later in 1969 developed multi-purpose car Skopak.

In 1961, Allwin Engineering introduced precision auto parts to the Pakistani automobile market. In 1962, Lambretta partnered with Wazir Ali Engineering to begin production of the Lambretta TV200 scooter while Kandawala Industries introduced the CJ 5, CJ 6, and CJ 7 series Jeep. In 1963, General Tyre Pakistan began production in Karachi, and Hye Sons began production of Mack Trucks. In 1964, Rana Tractors began producing Massey Ferguson Tractors. At the same time, the Vespa scooter and rickshaw were introduced by Raja Auto Cars. In 1965, Jaffer Industries and Mannoo Motors began operations in the country.

=== Nationalisation (1970–1989) ===
The 1970s saw the nationalization of many companies. In 1972, the Pakistan Automobile Corporation was formed. Many companies were bought out or merged into others. Wazir Ali Engineering was renamed Sindh Engineering, Ali Autos became Awami Autos, Haroon Industries to Republic Motors, Ghandara Motors to National Motors, Hye Sons to Mack Trucks, Kandawala Industries to Naya Daur Motors, Jaffer Industries to Trailer Development Corporation, and Rana Tractors to Millat Tractors. Dawood Yamaha introduced Yamaha motorcycles in 1974, and in the same year, Beta Engineering started producing diesel engines. In 1976, Sindh Engineering launched Suzuki Motor Cycles. Saif Nadeem Kawasaki launched Kawasaki motorcycles in 1977. Naya Daur Motors began manufacturing Suzuki Jeep.

In 1980, Awami Motors began manufacturing Suzuki pickups while Sindh Engineering began producing Mazda Trucks. In 1981, Agriauto Industries introduced the production of local auto parts, and in 1982, Pak Suzuki started the production of vehicles. In 1983, the Vendor Development & Technical Cell or VDTC was formed by Al-Ghazi Tractors, which introduced by Fiat. In 1986, Hinopak Motors began as a joint venture between Pakistan Automobile Corporation, Al-Futtaim Group, Hino Motors, & TTC. In 1987, Ghandhara Nissan began production of Nissan Diesel Trucks. In 1989, the Pakistan Association of Auto Parts & Accessories Manufacturers began operations.

=== Deregulation (1990–2009) ===
Until the early 1990s, the industry was highly regulated. Following deregulation, the decade witnessed a massive boom in auto production as nationalization was abandoned in favor of privatization. Suzuki Motor Corporation of Japan increased its ownership to 40% of the shares of Pak Suzuki in 1991. In 1993, the Indus Motors Company began production of Toyota Corollas. 1994 saw the creation of the Pakistan Automotive Manufacturers Association, and Honda Atlas introduced manufacturing of the Honda Civic. In 1995, the Engineering Development Board inaugurated the PAP show.

From 2001 to 2007, small assemblers and many bike importers began assembling replicas of the Honda CD70. With collaboration from China, the Association of Pakistan Motorcycle Assemblers (APMA) was established. Mr. Muhammad Sabir Shaikh, who started making Chinese-based replicas, was the First Chairman of the APMA in 2002. After 2003, the annual production of motorcycles increased at record rates, reaching a peak of 195,688 sales in 2007, and in 2015, production surpassed 2.5 million units annually. During this period, Afzal Motors began the local assembly of Daewoo buses and trucks under license from Daewoo Bus, South Korea, and Tata Daewoo thanks to rising car financing up to 70–80% by banks and low-interest rates coupled with increasing rural purchases. From 2007 to 2009, the auto sector witnessed reduced sales amid high-interest rates and yen appreciation against the rupee. In 2007, the automotive industry made up 2.8% of Pakistan's GDP and contributed 16% to the manufacturing sector. The 2000s also saw the introduction of dual fuel options to run on petrol and CNG, which is more affordable and cheaper than petrol in the country.

=== Rapid growth (2010–present) ===
In 2010, auto sales rebounded and began increasing again. The auto industry predicted a growing demand in Pakistan and invested over Rs. 20 billion (US$72 million) over a decade. Motorcycle production hit a record level in 2016–17, with 2.5 million units produced in total. Auto Policy 2016-21 was introduced in 2015 to help lure new automakers, historically dominated by Honda, Toyota, and Suzuki. The auto industry remains the second-largest payer of indirect taxes after the petroleum industry in Pakistan. There are ten cars for every 1,000 people in Pakistan. This is one of the lowest ratios among emerging economies, which speaks of high growth potential. According to a report published by PakDrive, Suzuki Mehran car sales in Pakistan reached 46,221 units, showing an increase from 37,933 units in 2017. Sales data for the Suzuki Mehran is reported annually, covering the period from June 1999 to 2018.

Rising per capita income, changing demographic distribution, and an anticipated influx of 30 to 40 million young people in the economically-active workforce within the next decade will boost the industry. Alongside the drastic increase in the middle class, Toyota started the local assembly of its sedan, the Toyota Corolla. Similarly, United Motors started producing a locally made car. Ghandhara Automobiles Limited started the production of the Isuzu D-Max in Pakistan.

== Production by year (2020-2023) ==
=== Automobiles ===
Production by year (2020-2023)
Year	Production
2020	350,000
2021	342,300
2022	338,282
2023	85,087

== Active brands ==
=== Local manufacturers ===
- Dewan Farooque Motors
- DYL Motorcycles
- Sazgar
- United Auto Industries

=== Foreign assemblers & manufacturers ===
- Al Haj FAW Motors — (FAW)
- Atlas Honda — (Honda Motorcycles)
- Ghandhara Automobiles Limited — (Dongfeng, JAC, Renault Trucks)
- Ghandhara Industries — (Isuzu)
- Hinopak Motors — (Hino)
- Honda Atlas Cars — (Honda)
- Hyundai Nishat Motors — (Hyundai)
- Indus Motors Company — (Toyota)
- Lucky Motor Corporation — (Kia, Peugeot)
- Master Motors — (Changan, Chery, Deepal, Foton, Fuso, Yutong)
- MG JW Automobile — (MG)
- Pak Suzuki Motors — (Suzuki)
- Sazgar — (BAIC, Haval)
- Volvo Pakistan — (Volvo)

== Former brands ==
- Adam Motor Company
- Nexus Automotive — (Chevrolet)
- Yamaha Motor Pakistan — (Yamaha)

== Others (authorized local dealers & distributors only) ==
Few mainstream brands like Audi, BMW, BYD, Jaecoo, Land Rover, Mercedes-Benz, Omoda, Porsche and others have official representation in Pakistan, but some brands that do not have official representation can be imported through exotic car dealers located in Pakistan and the Gulf region.

== See also ==
- Electric vehicle industry in Pakistan
