= Nexus Automotive =

Ceased Pakistani car company

Nexus Automotive (Pvt) Ltd was an importer and assembler of General Motors vehicles and genuine parts in Pakistan. The company was founded by M.A. Razaq, an expatriate Pakistani who retired as Corporate Vice President of General Motors Corporation, in 1999. Balubaid Establishment of Saudi Arabia, a diversified group involved in automotive, real estate, and other industrial businesses, was an investor in the assembly business of Nexus Automotive. The company was privately owned, with ownership distributed between Pakistani and Saudi families. Nexus used the idle capacity at the Ghandhara Nissan Limited plant at Port Qasim to assemble vehicles, under a contract assembly agreement.

The project was estimated at 15 million US dollars and GM-Chevrolet provided support to ensure that the local components and the car assembly met GM quality standards. The company also planned to export its models to other countries in South Asia and Africa. The source of assembly kits and imported units was GM Daewoo, a GM subsidiary in South Korea that supplies Chevrolet, Opel, Suzuki, and Daewoo branded vehicles to markets including the United States, Latin America, Europe, the Middle East and Africa, Australia and Asia. GM Daewoo is also the "corporate center of excellence" for GM's global small car platform, code-named Gamma. Current products exported by GM Daewoo include Chevrolet Spark, Aveo, Optra, Captiva, and Epica.

== Model lineup ==
Previously, Nexus imported the Chevrolet Optra, Chevrolet Spark, Chevrolet Aveo, Chevrolet Cruze and Chevrolet Joy vehicles and marketed them nationally through their franchised dealer network. From December 2005, the manufacturing of Chevrolet Joy started in Pakistan. Other GM products sourced from the global GM network were also planned for introduction to the Pakistani local market.

== Competition ==
Pakistan's automotive sector has experienced significant growth. The small-car segment remains partially monopolized by Pak Suzuki and other brands. In the past, government policies have consistently favored Pak Suzuki, Toyota, and Honda due to which further investment has been blocked in the country. But now new policies are inviting new producers to enter the market. When Nexus Automotive was operating Gandhara Nissan (Nissan), Deewan Mushtaq (Hyundai and Kia), and Adam Motors had assembling operations in Pakistan.

== Reasons for failure and revival ==
The company struggled to make substantial sales in the market dominated by its competitors Pak Suzuki Motors, Toyota Indus Motor Company, Honda Atlas Motor Cars and re-conditioned car imports. Despite being a new entrant, no incentive was granted to Nexus by the government similar to Adam Motors. Eventually the sales dropped to the point where assembly became nonviable and the company exclusively focused on CBU (Completely Built Unit) imports during its final months. Nexus ceased operations in 2006.

It has been reported by the media that General Motors along with Volkswagen and Renault-Nissan may consider entering the Pakistani market again. The 2016–21 Automotive Industry Development Policy approved in March 2016 included incentives for new entrants and non-operational units (such as Nexus, Gandhara Nissan, and Deewan Farooq). The new policy increased the chances of these units resuming their operations in Pakistan. Since cars in Pakistan are required to be right-hand drive, General Motors’ decision to stop mass-producing right-hand-drive passenger vehicles globally has further reduced the possibility of the company restarting its operations in Pakistan.
