= PakWheels =

Online community of automobile enthusiasts in Pakistan

Pakwheels
- Type: Private
- Industry: Automotive
- Founded: July 18, 2003; 23 years ago
- Founder: Muhammad Hanif Bhatti
- Headquarters: Lahore, Punjab, Pakistan
- Key people: Suneel Sarfaraz Munj; Muhammad Raza Saeed (CEO)
- Products: Digital automotive marketplace
- Website: www.pakwheels.com

PakWheels is a Pakistani online marketplace for car shoppers and sellers based in Lahore. It aggregates thousands of new, used, and certified second-hand cars from thousands of dealers and private sellers. The site also provides users with automotive reviews, shopping advice, and comparison tools for car financing and insurance information. It serves as an online community of automobile enthusiasts, with over 600,000 registered members on its online forum. PakWheels was founded in July 2003 in Karachi by Muhammad Hanif Bhatti. It was bought by Raza Saeed and Suneel Munj in 2007.

== Products and website ==
PakWheels offers services that help consumers buy cars, sell cars, or research car purchases. For those looking to buy a car, the site offers listings of new and used vehicles. Sellers can list cars directly for sale to a buyer or the site can also offer to sell it with various levels of service including a level where the website representatives handle many of the details, including writing the ad, taking photos, and pre-screening potential buyers.

The website has an editorial team that publishes PakWheels Blog, which reviews new and used cars and provides tips and advice via YouTube videos, articles, and social media content. The website offers its products and services online and on its iPhone and Android apps. Apart from sale and purchase, an online internet forum allows users to interact with other automobile enthusiasts across Pakistan, specifically in regard to problems associated with their automobiles.

PakWheels also organizes annual PakWheels Auto Show in Lahore, Karachi, Islamabad, Peshawar, Multan, Faisalabad, Sialkot, Bahawalpur, Gujranwala, and Okara.

== Recognition ==
- 12th Teradata National IT Excellence Award for Excellence in IT Enabled Service Offering
- AWS Migrate Startup 2018

== See also ==
- PakWheels Auto Show
- Automotive industry in Pakistan
