= PakWheels Auto Show =

Series of annual auto shows in Pakistan

- An aerial view of the PakWheels Lahore Auto Show 2012
- Status: Active
- Genre: Exhibition
- Locations: Karachi, Lahore, Islamabad, Multan and Faisalabad
- Country: Pakistan
- Inaugurated: 2011–present
- Organiser: PakWheels
- Website: pakwheels.com/autoshow/

PakWheels Auto Show is a series of annual auto shows organised by PakWheels. The initiative was started in 2011 in Lahore and has since expanded to Islamabad, Karachi and Multan. In addition to promoting the automotive industry in Pakistan and showcasing a variety of cars, the PakWheels shows aim to increase awareness of the dangers of reckless driving and street racing.

== History ==
=== 2011 ===
Owing to the stagnant automobile industry in Pakistan and lack of auto shows in the country, PakWheels arranged an auto show in Lahore on March 23, 2011 to promote the automotive culture and to provide a platform for the automotive enthusiasts to gather, discuss and showcase their rides. The show featured many exotics, tuners and luxury sports cars.

=== 2012 ===
After a positive response from the first auto show, PakWheels organised another auto show the following year on March 25 in collaboration with Tourism Development Corporation Punjab (TDCP). The show was also supported by the Government of Punjab, which allowed for a series of similar auto shows in other parts of the country. The show was attended by 10,000 people. On November 11, PakWheels hosted another auto show at Islamabad's Fatima Jinnah Park. The show had a display of more than 500 exclusive cars and was attended by 15,000 people, making it the "biggest gathering of automobile enthusiasts" in Pakistan and the first of its kind in that city. Warid Telecom was the primary sponsor for the event.

=== 2013 ===
The 2013 Lahore Auto Show was held on March 7 at Liberty Market and had financial and organisational support from the Punjabi government and TDCP. It coincided with the Rang-e-Pakistan Festival and was sponsored by Warid and Shell. Around 350 cars and bikes had been registered to be shown prior to the event, but more than 150 additional vehicles were brought day-of to be displayed. Go-karting was a main activity at the event and Club Caramel performed at the closing ceremony. This was followed by the Karachi Auto Show in September, where more than 250 cars were shown. These included vintage cars, imported exotic and tuner cars, superbikes and a Ferrari 2012 Formula 1 model car. More than 20,000 people attended. The 2nd Annual Islamabad Auto Show took place over two days in late November/early December at the 2F2F Karting Track. It was the first two-day event and attracted more than 50,000 attendees. A go-kart championship, live music, and movie montages were among the activities offered at the festival, and was again sponsored by Shell and Warid.

=== 2014 ===
The Lahore Auto Show 2014 was held on March 16 at Liberty Roundabout and raised funds for Shaukat Khanum Memorial Cancer Hospital and Research Centre. Fawad Khan appeared at the opening ceremony. The Shell University Drive also took place, a competition that brought in Pakistani university students to compete for tickets to the Malaysian Grand Prix. Later that year, the 2nd Annual Karachi Auto Show was held at the Karachi Expo Center and was sponsored by Warid. Attendance increased again and Pakistani celebrities, including Nadir Magsi, Nadeem Khan, Ronnie Patel and Mohsin Ikram, made an appearance. The 3rd Annual Auto Show of Islamabad took place on November 23 at Fatima Jinnah Park and was attended by thousands of people.

=== 2015 ===
PakWheels held its first auto show in Multan that February, marking the first time a show of that kind had been held in that city. This was followed in March by the 5th Annual Auto Show of Lahore at Liberty Market. The Nation reported that the event failed to attract large crowds as in previous years, while a press release from PakWheels stated there were 10,000 attendees. Highlights of the show included a life-size replica of a Shell Formula 1 car brought in from Italy and celebrities such as Ali Zafar. At the closing award ceremony, the founder of PakWheels thanked the show's volunteers.
