= DYL Motorcycles =

Pakistani motorcycle manufacturer

- Type: Joint Venture
- Industry: Motorcycle
- Founded: 1976
- Headquarters: Hub, Balochistan, Pakistan
- Key people: Yunus Dawood (CEO)
- Products: Motorcycles, Scooters, Sports Bikes
- Parent: Dawood Hercules Corporation
- Website: dylmotorcycles.com

DYL Motorcycles - (DYL Limited) formerly known as Dawood Yamaha Limited was a Pakistani motorcycle manufacturer owned by members of the Dawood family and based in Hub, Balochistan, Pakistan since 1976.

== History ==
DYL Motorcycles was founded in 1976 as Dawood Yamaha Limited (DYL), a joint venture between members of the Dawood family and Yamaha Motor Company of Japan. The company manufactured Yamaha motorcycles locally for the Pakistani market for several decades.

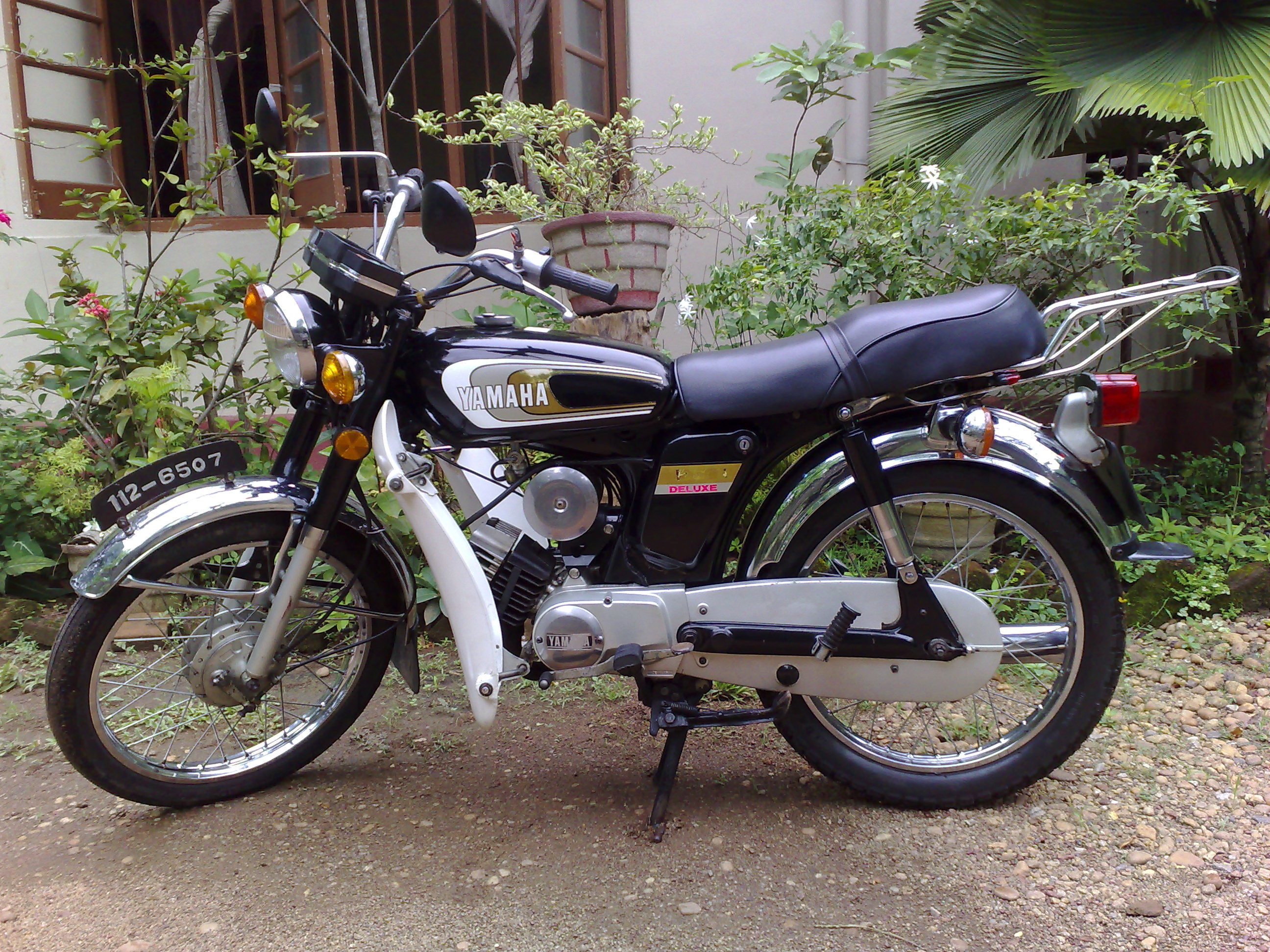
Yamaha YB-100

In 2008, following the conclusion of its technical collaboration with Yamaha, the company was rebranded as DYL Motorcycles. After rebranding, DYL introduced new models under its own name, including the YD-70 Dhoom, which was positioned as a successor to the Yamaha YB-100 Royale that had been produced in Pakistan for approximately thirty years.

DYL Motorcycles’ manufacturing operations are based in Uthal, Balochistan, while key components such as frames, fuel tanks, swing arms, fenders, gears, hubs, levers, and crankcases are produced by its sister company, Balochistan Engineering Works, located in Hub, Balochistan

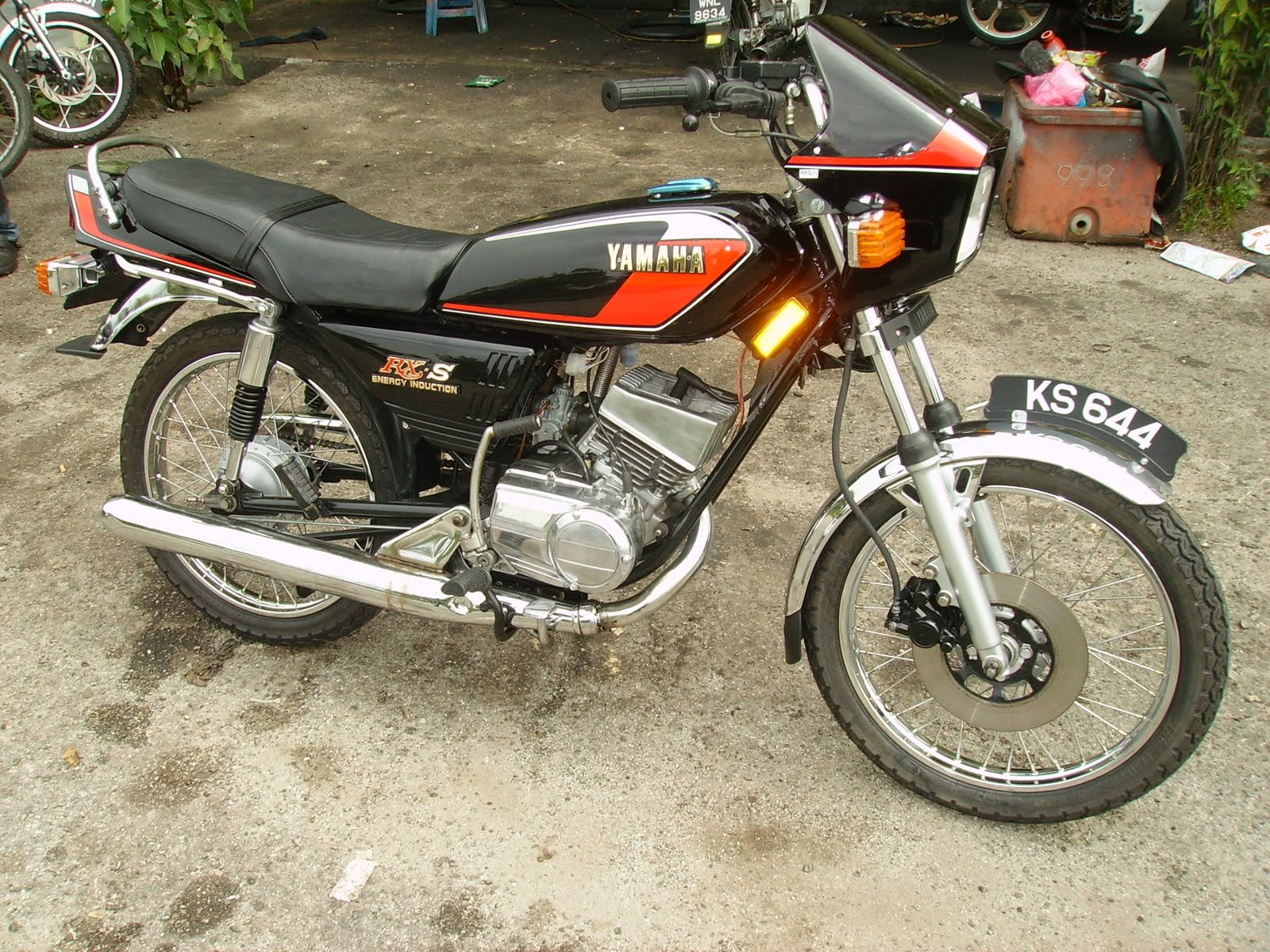
Yamaha Rx-115

== Yamaha Motorcycles Produced / Introduced by DYL (Chronological) ==
1976

- Yamaha YB-100 (CBU) – Launched in Pakistan following the establishment of Dawood Yamaha Limited.
- Yamaha YB-80 (CBU) – Lightweight commuter motorcycle.
- Yamaha YB-50 (CBU) – Lightweight commuter motorcycle.

The Yamaha YB‑100, The YB-80, The YB-50 used a chassis design shared with the Yamaha Trailmaster, a lightweight trail-oriented motorcycle sold internationally. This shared platform contributed to the YB‑100’s durability and adaptability to both urban roads and light off-road conditions in Pakistan, Positioned as a reliable two-stroke commuter motorcycle.

1980s

(CBU imports and limited assembly era)

- Yamaha RX115 (CBU) – Performance-oriented two-stroke model.
- Yamaha YB-80 (CBU) – Lightweight commuter motorcycle.
- Yamaha DT-100 (CBU) – Dual-sport / Enduro motorcycle. It was sold in Pakistan for PKR 17,000, highlighting its position as a high-range dual-sport motorcycle.
- Yamaha YB-100 – Imported alongside local production.

1990

- Yamaha YB-100 Royale – Introduced as an upgraded version of the YB-100.

Featured CDI ignition, updated styling, and improved electrical reliability

1990s–2003s

Continued production and support of Yamaha commuter motorcycles under the Yamaha–Dawood collaboration

In 2000, Yamaha introduced the YB-100 Royale Deluxe, a further refinement of the Royale platform featuring cosmetic updates and incremental electrical and trim improvements. This was followed in 2003 by the launch of the Yamaha 4, a four-stroke commuter motorcycle aimed at improving fuel efficiency and emissions compliance while continuing Yamaha’s focus on durability for the Pakistani market.

These models marked the final phase of Yamaha’s locally supported commuter lineup before the eventual conclusion of the Yamaha–Dawood collaboration.

== Post-Yamaha Era ==
Following the conclusion of its technical collaboration with Yamaha Motor Company, Dawood Yamaha Limited was rebranded as DYL Motorcycles in 2008. After the rebranding, the company shifted its focus toward developing and marketing motorcycles under its own brand name, with an emphasis on low-displacement commuter models tailored for the Pakistani market. DYL introduced the YD-70 Dhoom as its first major post-Yamaha product, followed by additional 70cc, 100cc, and 125cc motorcycles aimed at affordability, fuel efficiency, and increased localisation of components. Manufacturing operations continued in Balochistan, with final assembly based in Uthal and parts production supported by its sister company, Balochistan Engineering Works in Hub.

=== DYL Motorcycles Products ===
- YD-70 Dhoom – 70 cc commuter motorcycle.
- DYL Junoon – 100 cc performance-styled model.
- DYL Mini-100 – Compact 100 cc commuter motorcycle.
- YD-125 Sports – 125 cc sport-styled street bike.

After operating for decades, DYL Motorcycles struggled financially following the end of its technical collaboration with Yamaha in 2008 and eventually ceased major operations amid increasing debts and declining sales. Following this period, Yamaha returned independently to Pakistan by forming Yamaha Motor Pakistan (Private) Limited in 2013 and opening a new manufacturing facility in the Bin Qasim Industrial Park in Karachi in 2015, launching popular models such as the YBR125 and its variants as part of its re‑entry strategy. However, Yamaha’s local motorcycle production was officially discontinued in 2025 due to changes in its business policy and the challenges of competing in Pakistan’s highly price‑sensitive market, though the company has assured continued supply of spare parts and after‑sales support through its dealer network.

== See also ==
- Automotive industry in Pakistan
