= Yamaha YD 100 =

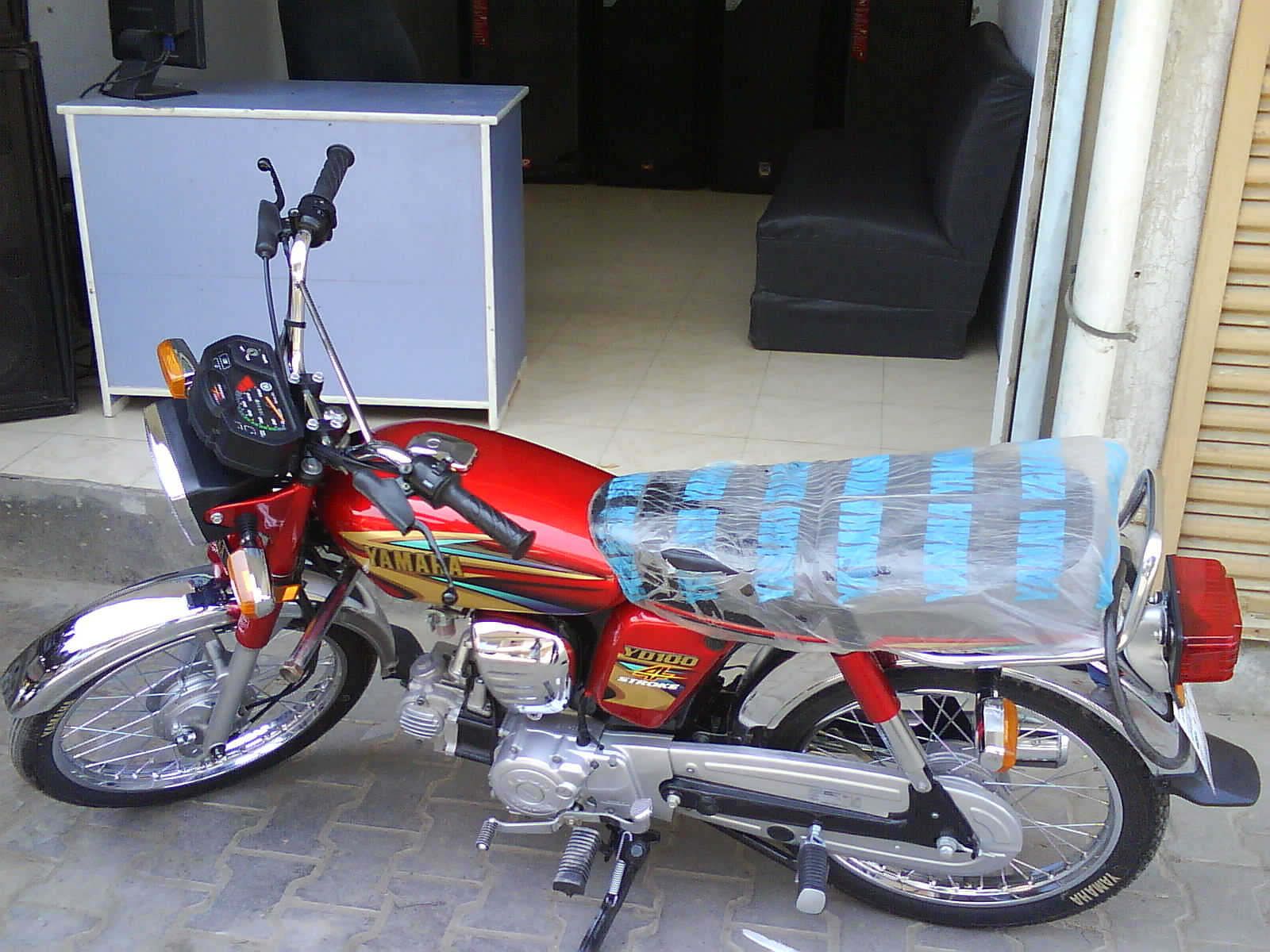
- Manufacturer: Yamaha Motor Company
- Parent company: Yamaha Corporation
- Production: 2003-2012
- Predecessor: YB 100
- Successor: Yamaha Junoon
- Class: Naked
- Engine: 102 cc (6.2 cu in) 4-stroke
- Bore / stroke: 49 mm × 54 mm (1.9 in × 2.1 in)
- Compression ratio: 9.0:1
- Power: 8.18 bhp (6.10 kW) @ 8,000 rpm
- Torque: 0.867 kgf (1.91 lbf) @ 6,500 rpm
- Transmission: 4-speed
- Suspension: Front: Telescopic fork Rear: Dual shocks swingarm
- Brakes: Front: Drum; Rear: Drum
- Tires: 18 front, 18 rear
- Wheelbase: 1,210 mm (48 in)
- Dimensions: L: 1,920 mm (76 in); W: 800 mm (31 in); H: 1,020 mm (40 in)
- Weight: 95 kg (209 lb) (dry) n/a (wet)
- Fuel capacity: 8.4 L (2.2 US gal)

The Yamaha YD 100 is a light motorcycle manufactured by the Dawood Yamaha Ltd. of Pakistan. Introduced in 2003, It comes as a naked frame, and has a single-cylinder, air-cooled, four-stroke engine, which displaces 102 cc (6.2 cu in). It is a very popular learner motorbike in Pakistan.
