= Pak Suzuki Motors =

Subsidiary of Suzuki in Pakistan

- Type: Subsidiary
- Traded as: PSX: PSMC (1983–2024)
- Industry: Automotive
- Founded: 1983; 43 years ago
- Headquarters: Karachi, Pakistan
- Area served: Pakistan
- Key people: Hirochi Kawamura (managing director and CEO)
- Products: Suzuki Automobiles
- Revenue: ▼ Rs. 102.109 billion (US$370 million) (2023)
- Operating income: ▲ Rs. 28.939 million (US$100,000) (2023)
- Net income: ▼ Rs. 10.069 billion (US$36 million) (2023)
- Total assets: ▼ Rs. 84.198 billion (US$300 million) (2023)
- Total equity: ▼ Rs. 9.818 billion (US$35 million) (2023)
- Number of employees: 1,493 (2023)
- Parent: Suzuki Motor Corporation
- Website: suzukipakistan.com

Pak Suzuki Motor Company Limited (PSMCL) is a Pakistani automobile company which is a subsidiary of Japanese automaker Suzuki.

It is the Pakistani assembler and distributor of cars manufactured by Suzuki and its subsidiaries and foreign divisions. Currently Pak Suzuki is the largest car assembler in Pakistan.

== History ==
The first model assembled at Pak Suzuki (Pak Suzuki 800)

Pak Suzuki Motors was founded in September 1982 as a joint venture between the Government of Pakistan and Suzuki Motor Japan, formalising the arrangement by which Awami Auto had produced the Suzuki SS80 from 1982. Suzuki originally owned 25 percent stake in the company which was increased to 40 percent in 1992, when it acquired the 15 percent stake of the Government of Pakistan at a price of PKR 117.19 per share, 172 million in total.

Having assembled both the Carry and Jimny locally since 1976, Suzuki's first locally built product was the 800 cc ST90 Carry van and truck. By 1984 the 1000 cc Jimny (SJ410) and 800 cc Alto/Fronte (called "FX") had been added to the lineup, and a second plant was planned for 1985. Cars built by Suzuki Pakistan often lack essential features which are standard in other cars, such as airbags, rear windshield defogger and rear seat belts. In 2006, Pak Suzuki offered factory-fitted CNG two years after rival Dewan Motors started offering the facility in their locally assembled Hyundai Santros.

By 2012, the Pakistani-assembled Suzuki Mehran remained possibly the last car in the world which still used a carbureted engine. Starting in 2013, the Suzuki Mehran was equipped with EFI engines to meet the old Euro-II emission standards. The Suzuki Mehran was finally discontinued in March 2019.

== Current Vehicles ==
Suzuki Alto (Eighth Generation)

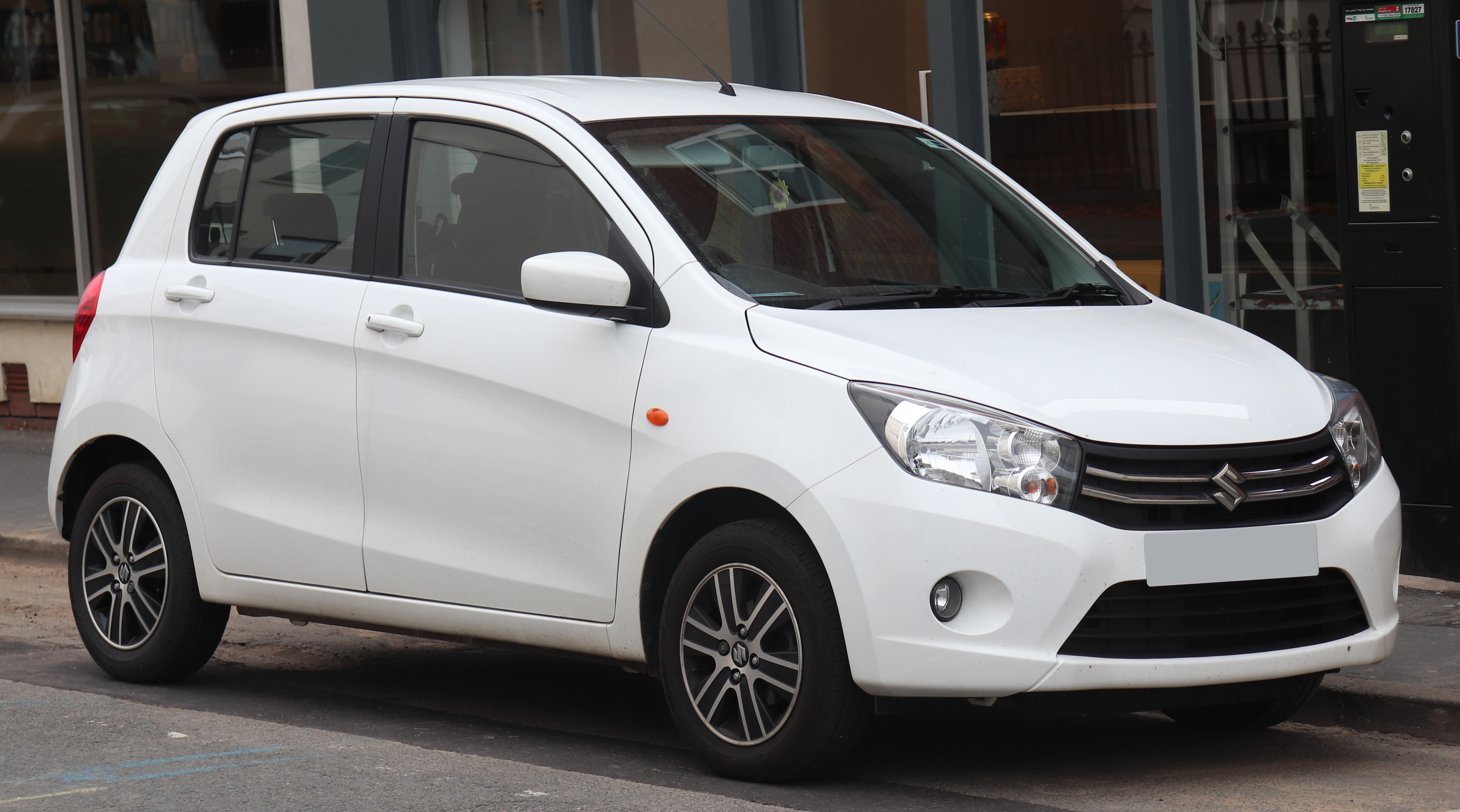
A second gen Suzuki Celerio rebadged as a Suzuki Cultus

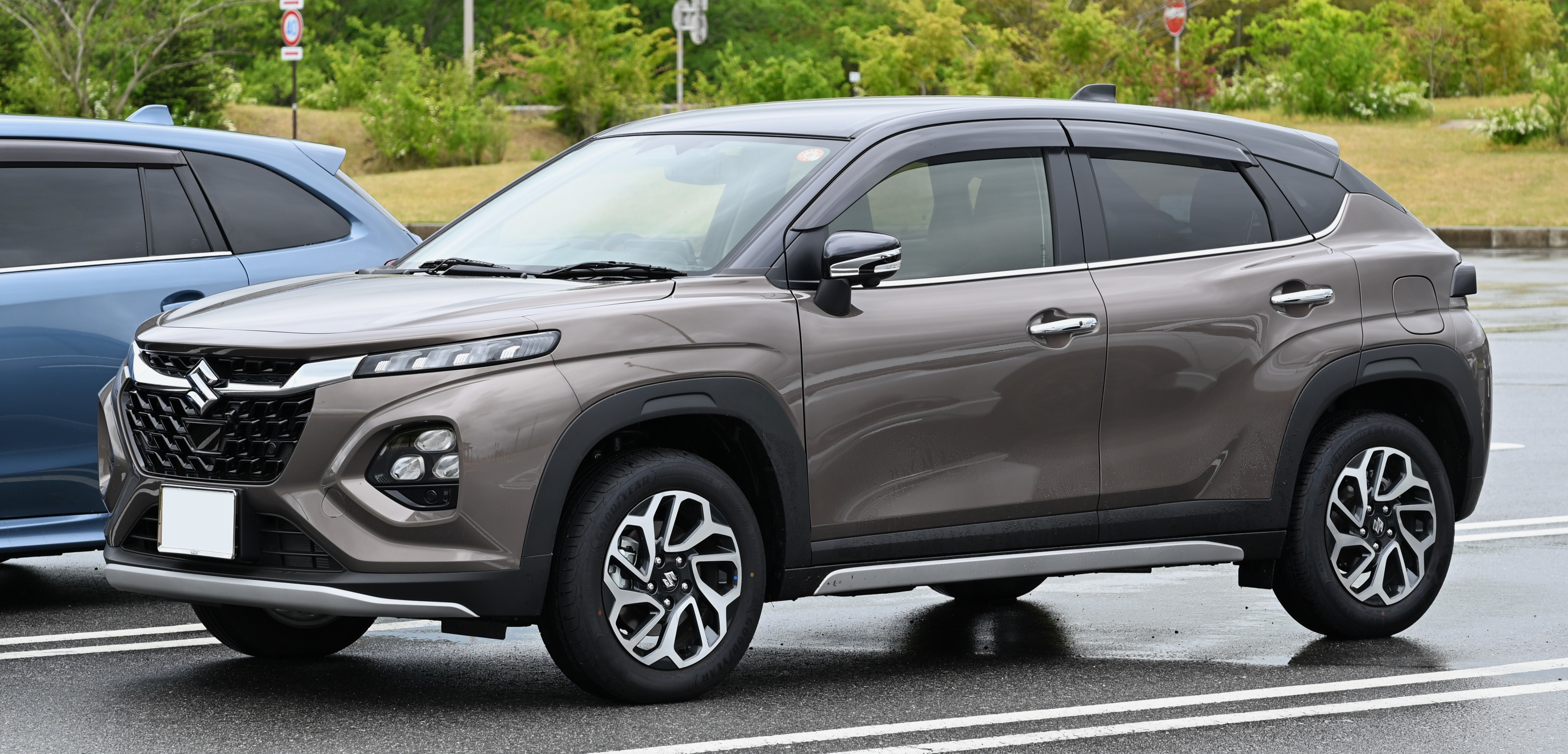
2024 Suzuki Fronx (Japan)

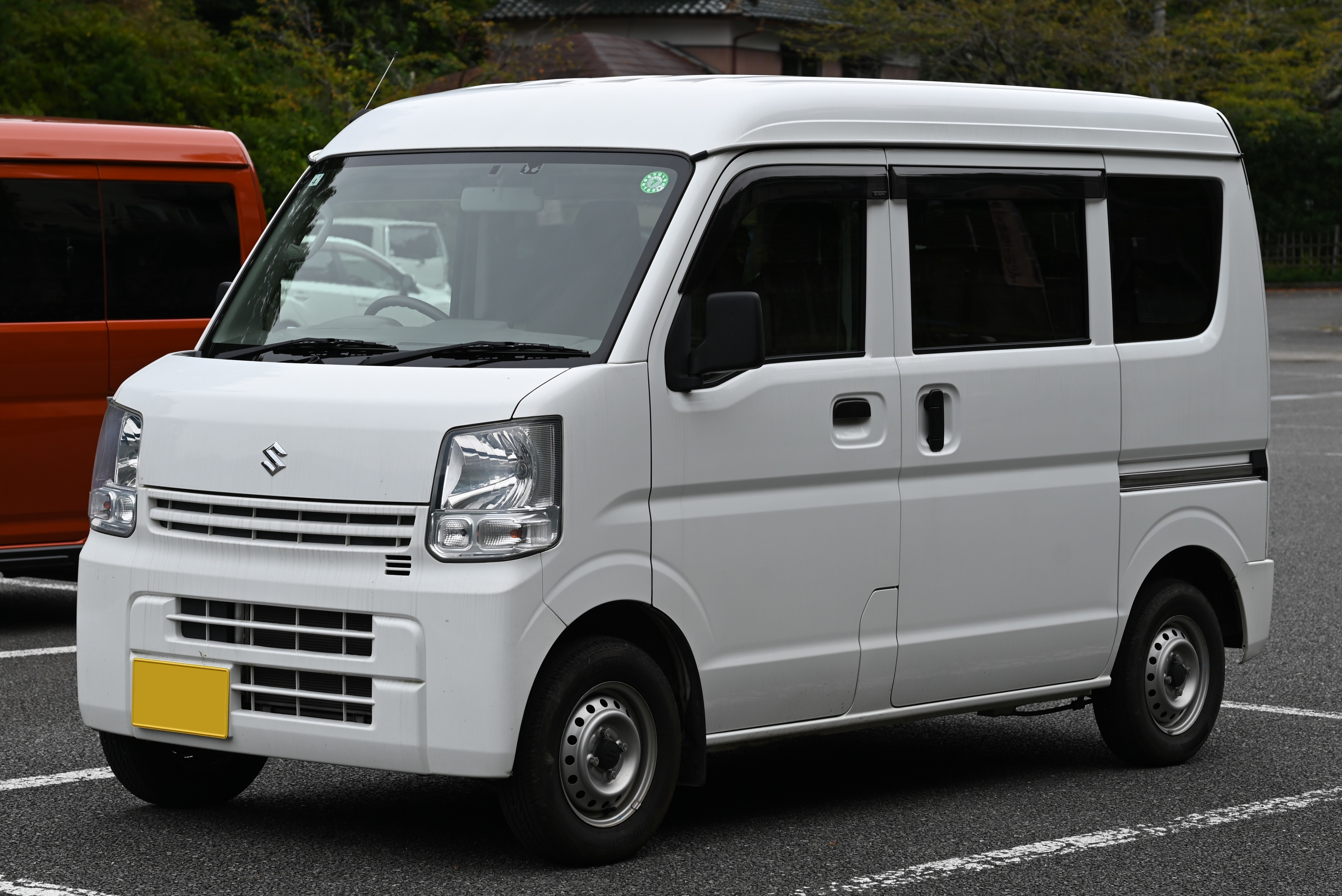
The 6th Generation Suzuki Every, replacing the "Suzuki Bolan" in Pakistan

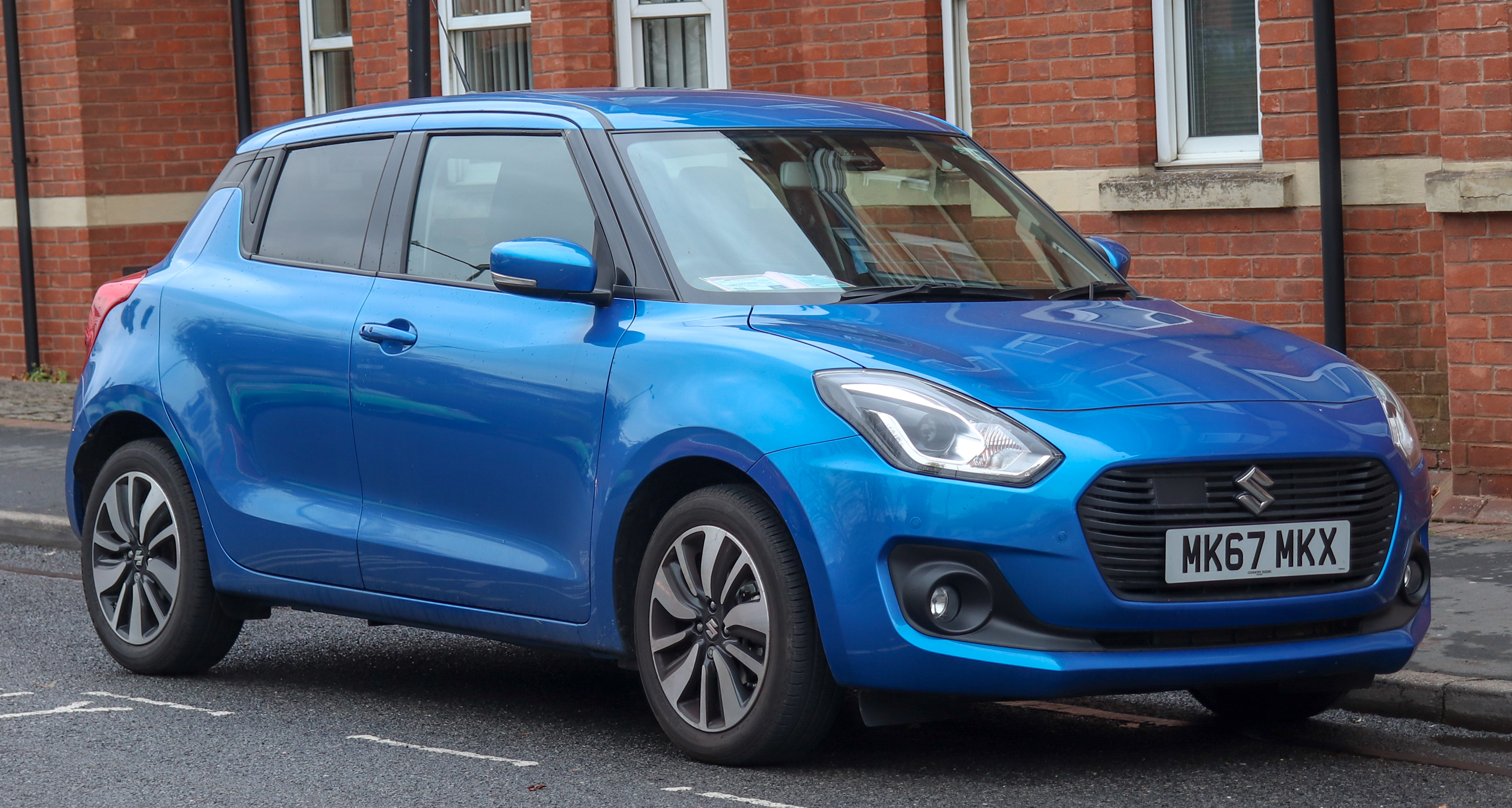
A 2nd gen Suzuki Swift for the Pakistani market while the 3rd gen Swift (Internationally) from the front

=== Suzuki Alto ===
As of 2024, Pak Suzuki is still selling the eighth generation Suzuki Alto in 3 different variants, all equipped with the 3-cylinder 658 cc R06A engine. AGS automatic transmission is offered as an optional extra on the VXR model but comes standard on the VXL variant.

- Suzuki Alto VX
- Suzuki Alto VXR (also offered as VXR AGS with automatic transmission)
- Suzuki Alto VXL

=== Suzuki Every ===
Pak Suzuki has begun manufacturing the sixth generation Suzuki Every from 2024 replacing the Suzuki Bolan. It is being sold in 2 different trims, VX (base model) and VXR (top model). Both are being offered with the same engine, a 658 cc R06A I3, which is an inline three DOHC 12 valve engine with VVT and is mated to a 5-speed manual transmission. It can produce 43 hp at 5700 RPMs and 58Nm of torque at 3700 RPMs.

=== Suzuki Fronx ===
Pak Suzuki released the subcompact crossover in May 2026. The Fronx is available in three trims, GL (Manual) the base model available with a 5 speed manual transmission and a 7-inch infotainment system, GL (Auto) offered with a 4-speed automatic transmission and the same infotainment system. The top of the line trim model being the GLX with a 6-speed automatic transmission, 9-inch infotainment system, keyless push start, paddle shifters, cruise control and 16-inch alloy rims. The GL trims come with the same 1.5 litre K15B inline 4, while the GLX trim comes with the K15C Inline 4, it being mild hybrid. Prices start at PKR 5,999,999 as of its release.

=== Suzuki Cultus (Celerio) ===
Pak Suzuki is selling the Second generation Suzuki Celerio under the 'Cultus' brand name. It is sold with the 3-cylinder 996 cc Suzuki K10B engine, with automatic transmission available as an option on the VXL trim level.

- Suzuki Cultus VXR
- Suzuki Cultus VXL (also offered as VXL AGS with automatic transmission)

=== Suzuki Swift ===
The third generation (A2L) Suzuki Swift has been sold by Pak Suzuki since 2022. It is available in 2 variants, all with the 4-cylinder 1197 cc Suzuki K12M engine and is offered with a choice of a 5-speed manual transmission or a CVT automatic transmission.

- Suzuki Swift GL (also offered as GL CVT with automatic transmission)
- Suzuki Swift GLX

== Former Vehicles ==
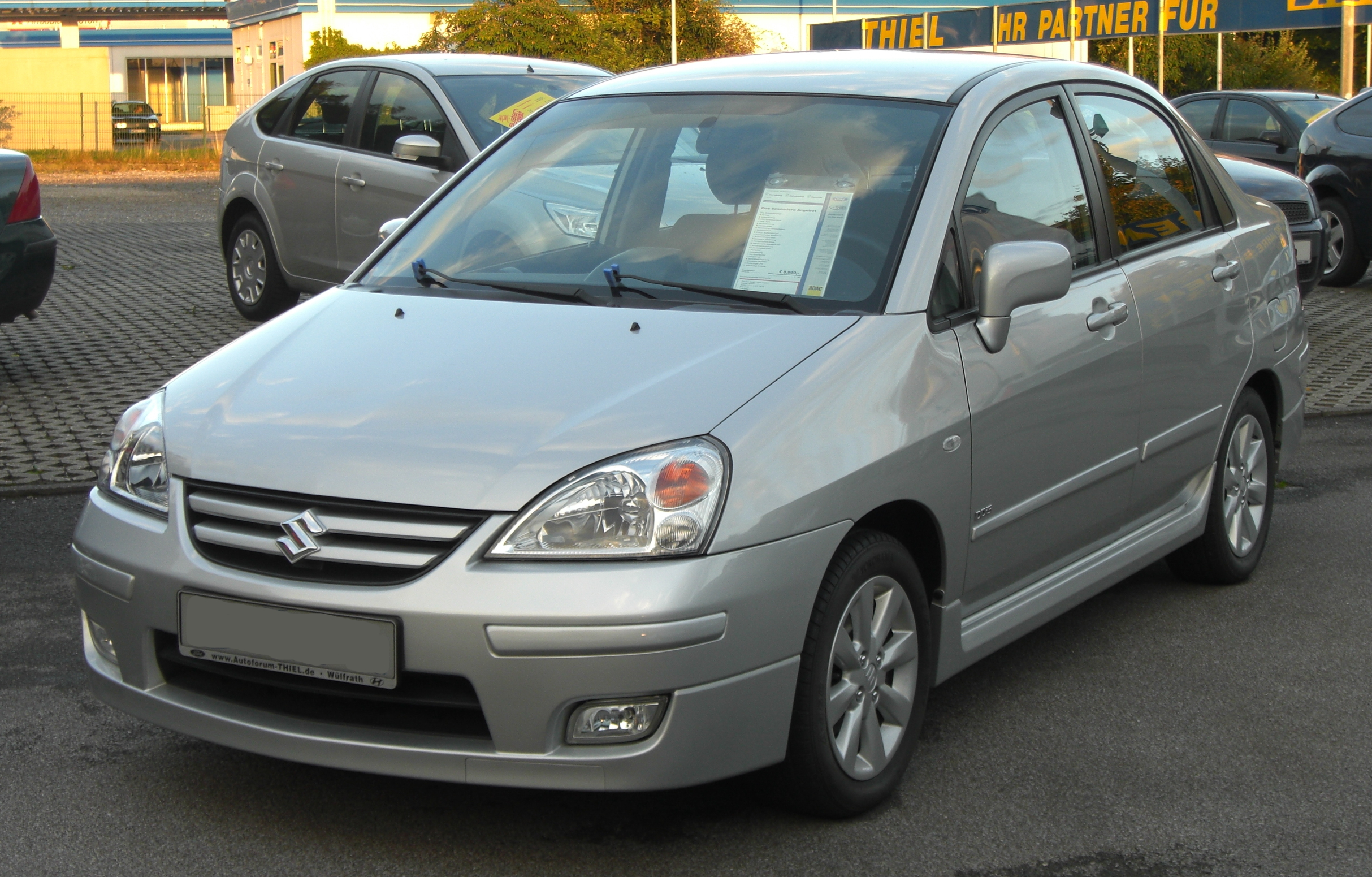
A German Origin Facelift Suzuki Liana

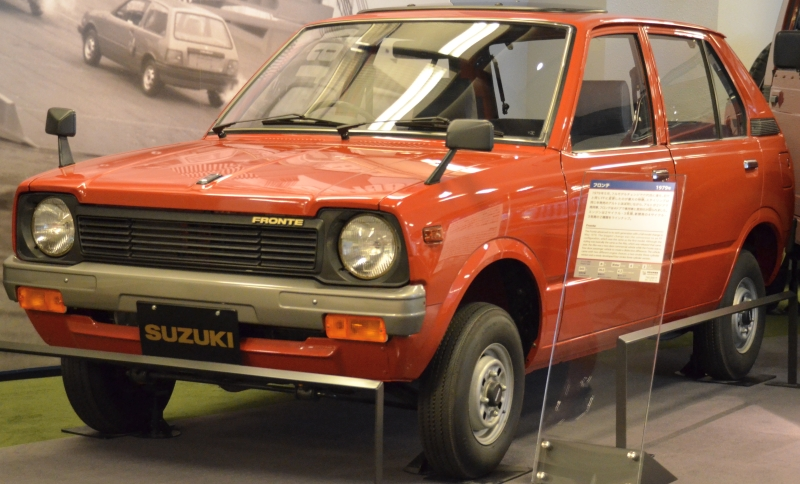
A Suzuki FX as seen in the Japan market

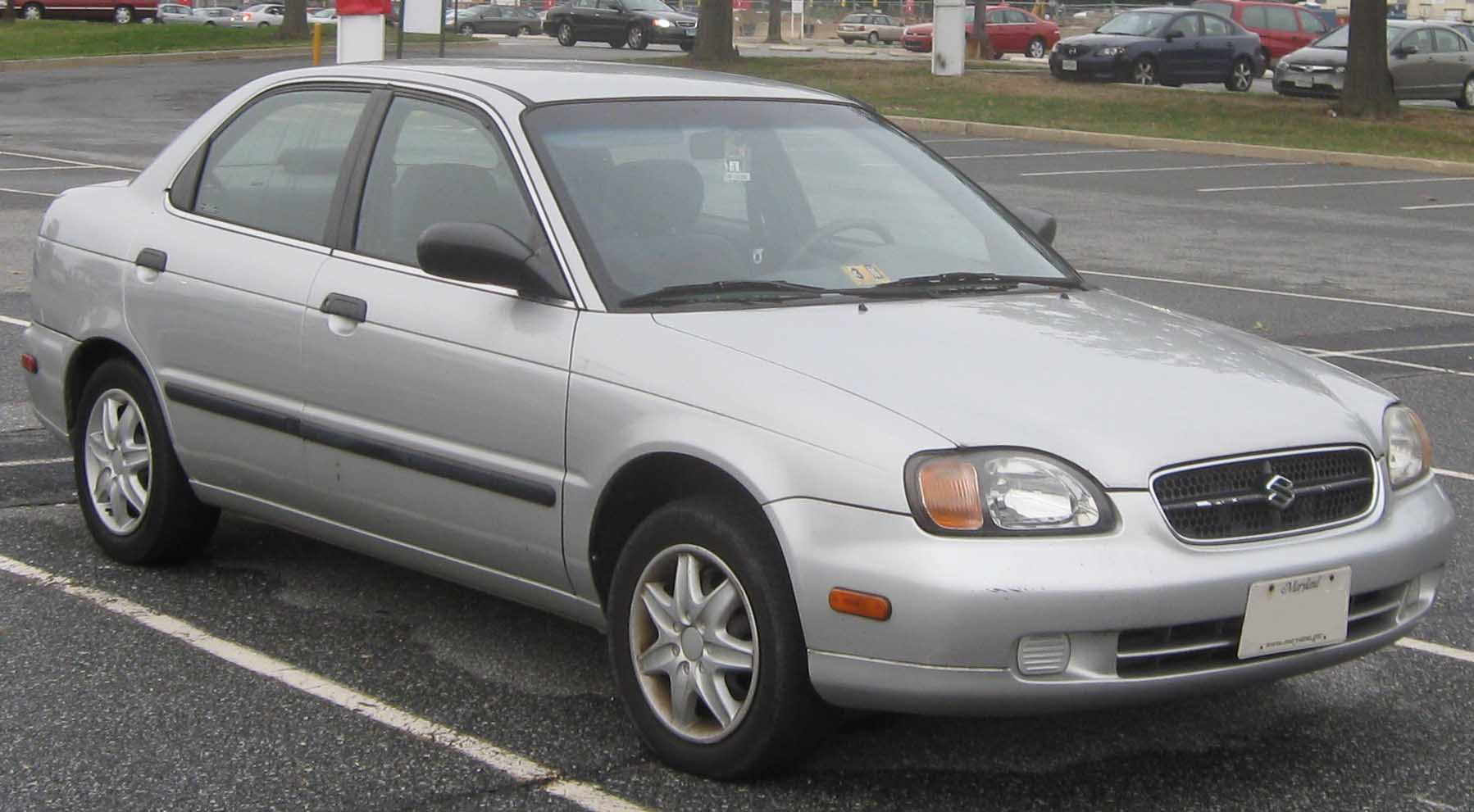
A silver Suzuki Baleno as seen internationally

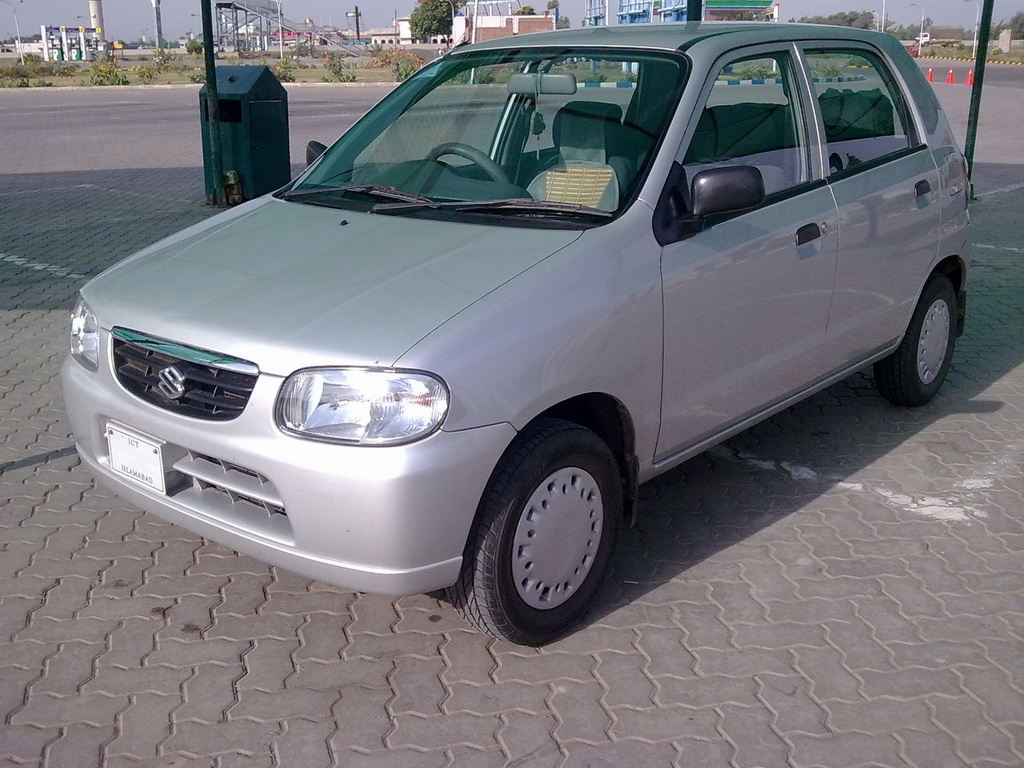
Suzuki Alto 1.0 (Pakistan, 5th Generation Outside Pak)

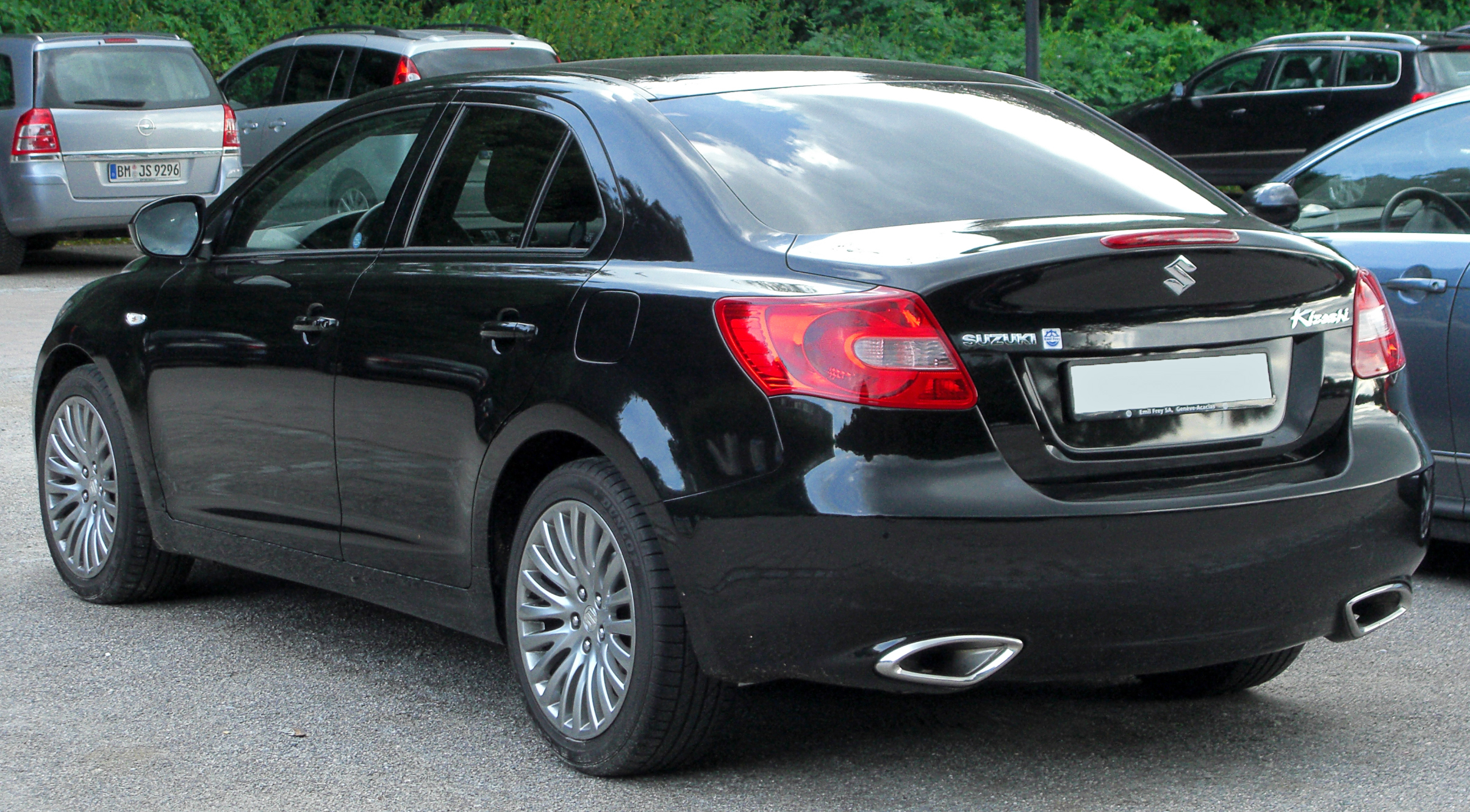
Rear View of the rare Suzuki Kizashi

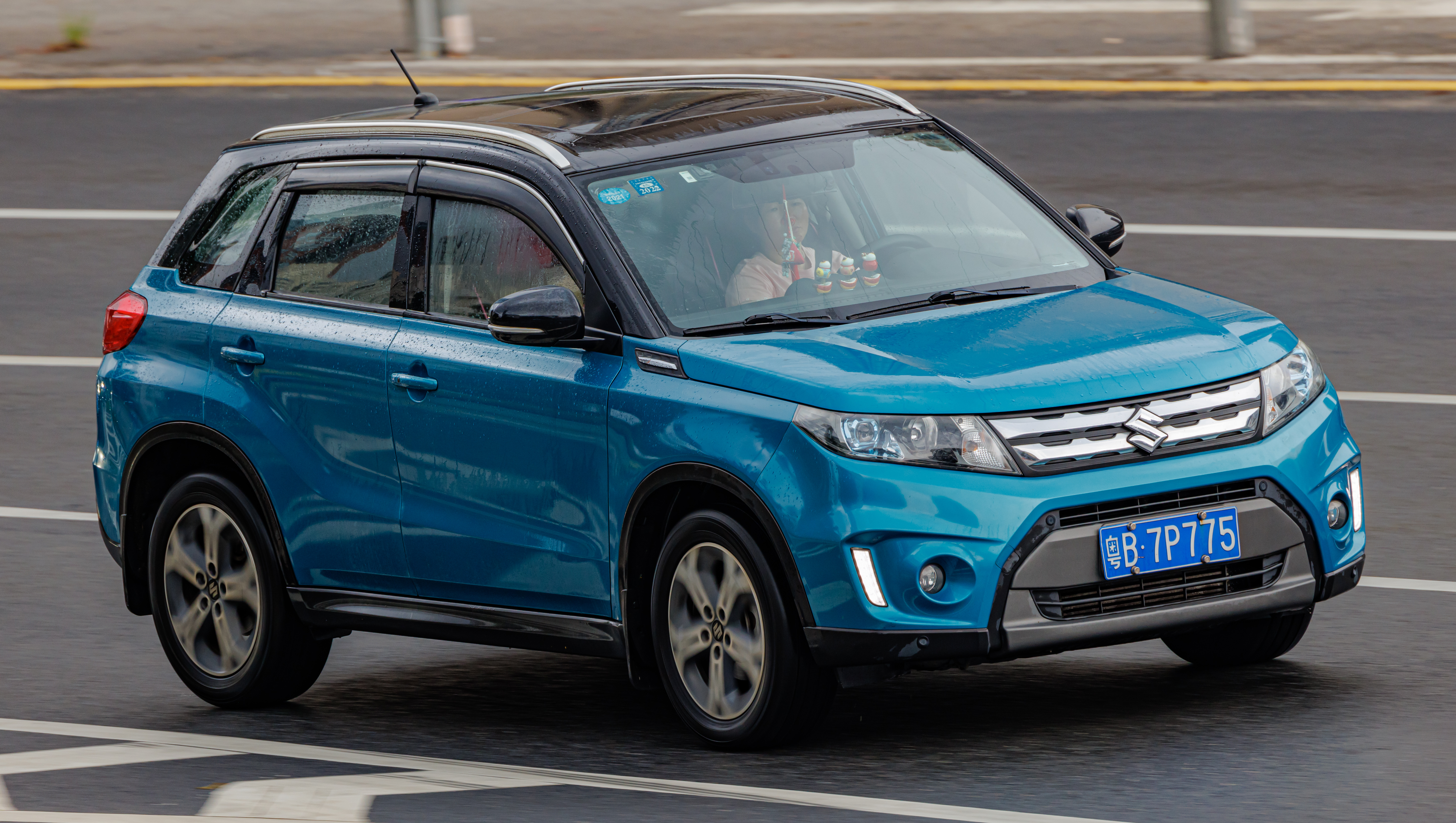
Front view of the pre-facelift Suzuki Vitara

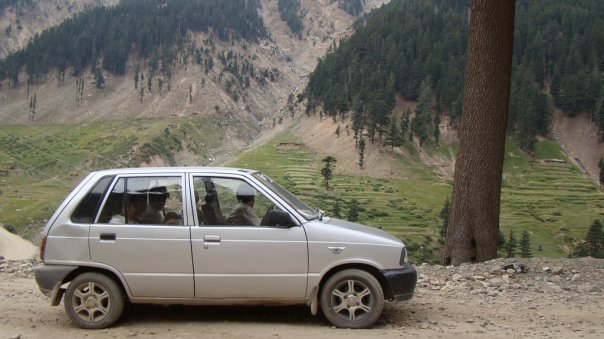
A Suzuki Mehran VX 2001 model at Lowari Pass

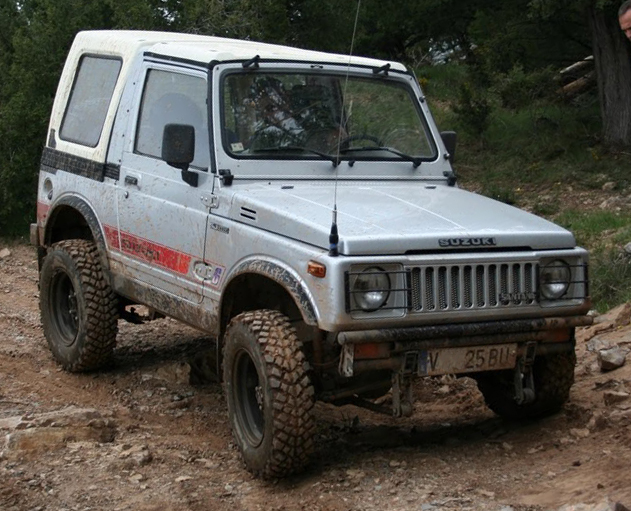
A Santana Built Suzuki Potohar

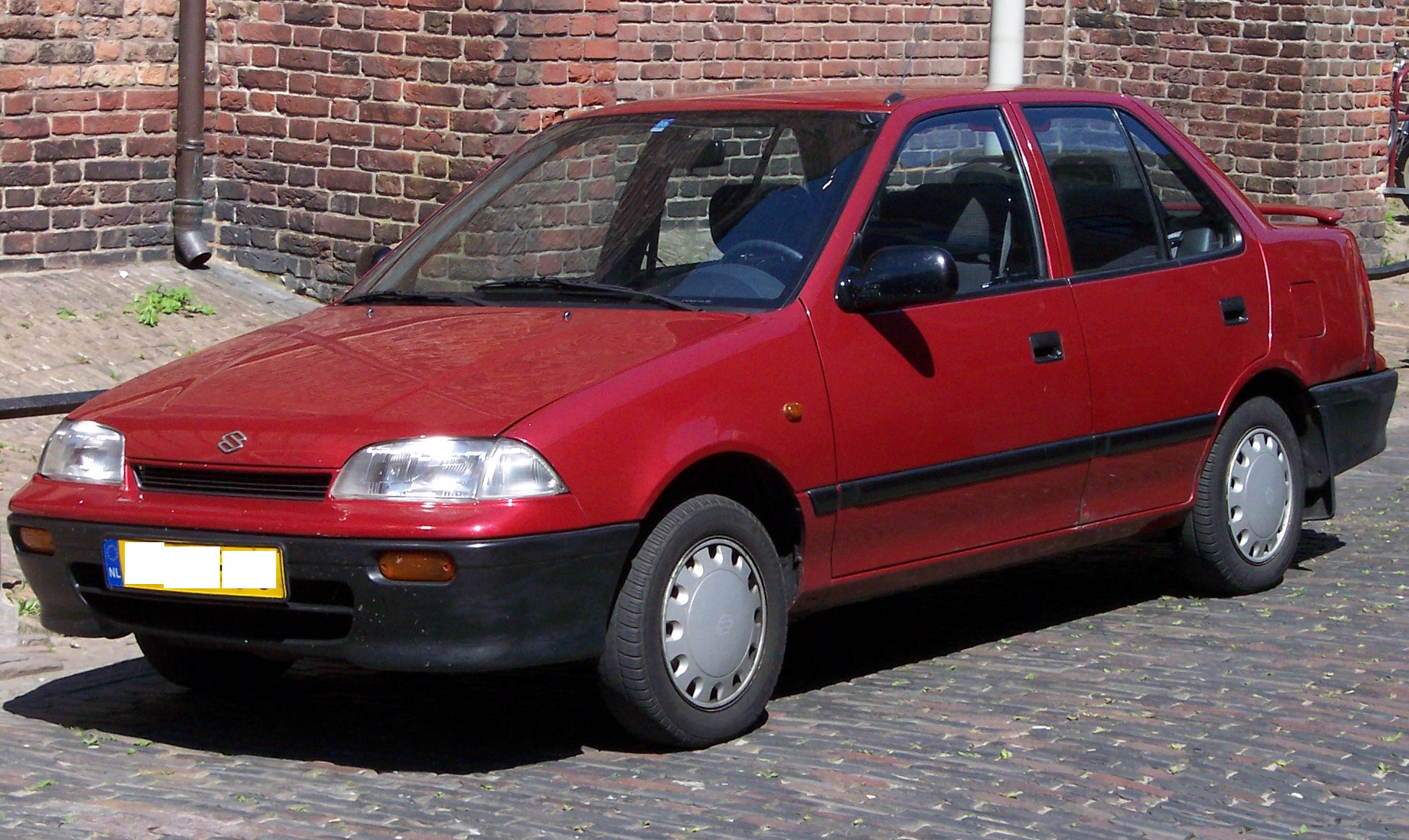
The second generation Suzuki Cultus sedan sold as the Suzuki Margalla

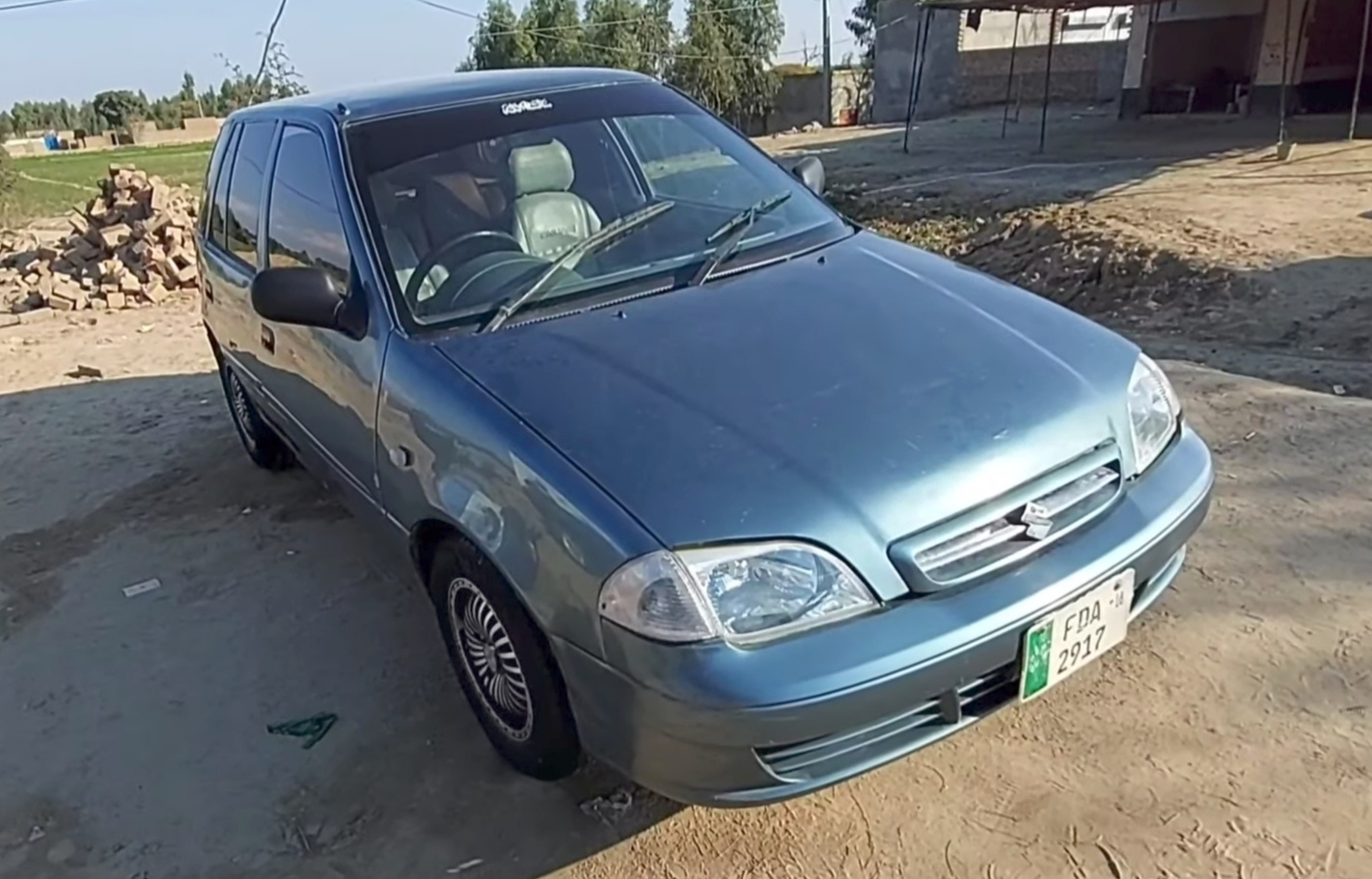
1st gen Suzuki Cultus VXRi 5-door hatchback (fourth facelift, Pakistan)

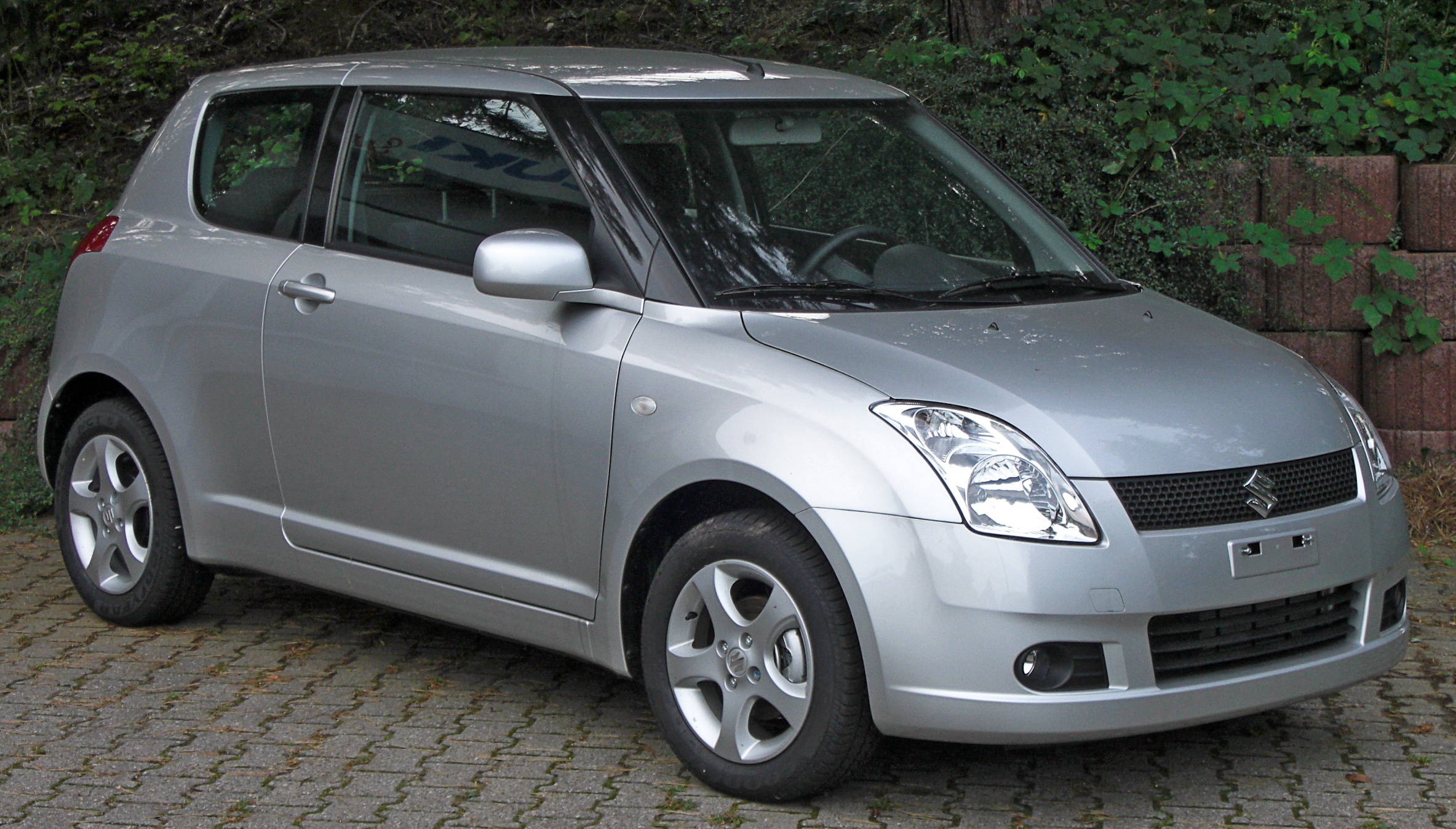
1st gen Suzuki Swift from the front

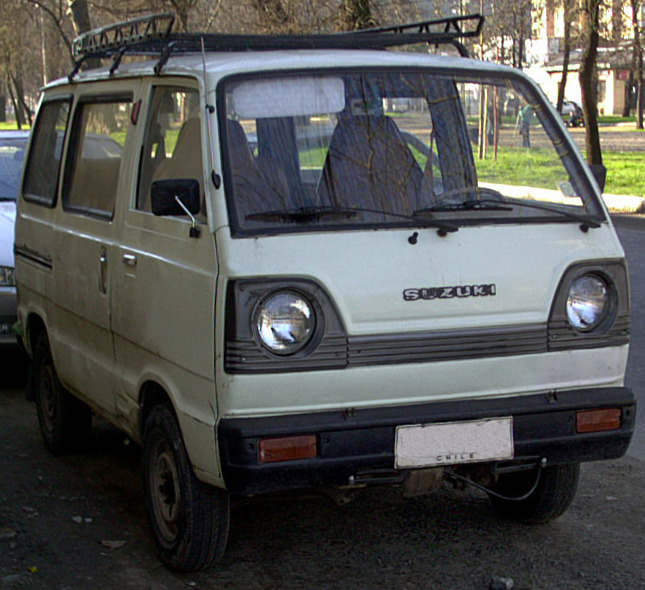
The 7th Generation Suzuki Carry, rebranded as the "Suzuki Bolan" in Pakistan

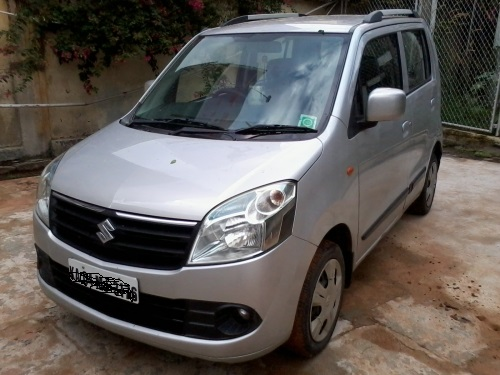
A Pre-Facelift Suzuki Wagon R of Indian origin

=== Suzuki Baleno ===
The SY413 Baleno (also known as the Cultus Crescent and Esteem in other countries) was assembled in Pakistan starting in 1998 as a replacement for the Suzuki Margalla, till 2006 when it was replaced by the Liana. When introduced, it featured several improvements over the Margalla, such as standard power steering, wider tyres, tachometer as standard, 4-spoke steering wheel, black interior, EFI, and 16-valve. It featured the G13BB engine, though on the chassis plate, it was stamped as G13B. Initial trim levels included GL, GXi, Gli and GliP (also known as Gli Plus).

=== Suzuki FX ===
Produced between 1982 and 1988. A modified version of the Suzuki Alto SS40 manufactured under the chassis code SS80, with a 796 cc F8B engine. Early models came with black interiors, later changed to beige interiors improving the aesthetics by making it appear spacious. Later models remained popular for this reason. A/C was available as an option in some years. Production was discontinued and Suzuki Mehran was launched as a replacement in 1989.

=== Suzuki Khyber ===
The first generation Cultus was sold in Pakistan as the Suzuki Khyber, by the Pak Suzuki assembly line, and produced between 1989 and 2000, only in the GA trim level. It was equipped with a four-stroke engine based on the G10A platform mated to a five-speed manual gearbox. Production was ended in 2000, replaced by the second generation Cultus.

=== Suzuki Kizashi ===
The last place where the Kizashi was on sale was Pakistan, after it had been removed from other markets. Pak Suzuki Motors, launched the Suzuki Kizashi on February 11, 2015, at the Pearl Continental Hotel, Lahore. It was imported as a Completely Built-up Unit (CBU) with no plans to manufacture it locally. The Kizashi was discontinued in 2016 due to poor sales.

=== Suzuki Liana ===
The Suzuki Liana sedan, originally with a 1.6-litre engine, replaced the Baleno.

=== Suzuki Margalla ===
The sedan shape of Suzuki Cultus second generation was initially (1990) imported from Japan to test the market and sold under the name Suzuki Sedan (possibly because it was the first sedan body style offered by Pak Suzuki Motors). It bore the chassis code SF310 and came with a carburetted 3-cylinder 993 cc G10 engine. The market reception was good, though the audience complained of low power. The same car was considered for local manufacture as an entry-level executive car. Manufacturing started in 1992 under the name Suzuki Margalla, chassis code SF413 using an 8-valve SOHC 4-cylinder G13 carburetted engine. It came with power steering as an option. The tachometer was not available in any of the variants. The car was offered in variants such as GL and GLX, with an upgraded variant called Margalla Plus launched later on. Production was halted in 1998 to give way to the replacement Suzuki Baleno. In the Pakistani used car market, "Suzuki Sedan" refers to the 1000 cc import model, whereas Suzuki Margalla means the locally assembledv 1300 cc model.

=== Suzuki Mehran ===
The Suzuki Mehran began production in 1988 as the "Alto", but was renamed Mehran in 1992. The name stems from an old Iranian name, meaning "child of the sun." The Mehran received minor facelifts in 1998 and again in 2004. The Mehran was available in VX, Euro-II or VXR equipment levels. It had again received a mild facelift with an asymmetric grille at the same time as the introduction of the EFi engine in 2012. Production ended in 2019.

- Suzuki Mehran VX
- Suzuki Mehran VXR
- Suzuki Mehran Euro - II

=== Suzuki Potohar ===
The Suzuki Samurai was produced by Spain's Santana Motors from 1985 to 2003 with an international 1982-1984 Suzuki F10A 970 cc carburettor engine. Pak Suzuki Motors manufactured it under the name Suzuki Potohar using the chassis code SJ410. The fuel ignition system was a legacy distributor with breaker points. A common after-market upgrade was to replace the stock distributor with the one that came with the locally manufactured Suzuki Alto. Only SWB versions were offered. Initial models came with 4-wheel drum brakes though later it was upgraded with front-wheel disc brakes as standard. Factory-fitted CNG was offered in some years as well. Potohar was popular due to high ground clearance, low-end torque, capable 4x4, low fuel consumption and easy maintenance. In 2006, Potohar was discontinued with no locally manufactured replacement. Rather Suzuki Jimny with M13A engine was offered as an import model at nearly twice the cost.

=== Suzuki Bolan ===
Pak Suzuki had been manufacturing the seventh generation Suzuki Carry; it was sold in two different variants. Both were offered with the same 796 cc Suzuki F8B engine and a 4-speed manual transmission only.

- Suzuki Bolan (passenger van)
- Suzuki Ravi (pick-up truck)

Production of the Bolan had ended in 2024 and is being replaced by the sixth generation Suzuki Every.

=== Suzuki Vitara ===
Pak Suzuki had launched the pre-facelift version of the fourth generation Suzuki Vitara in December 2016 as a CBU (Completely Built-up Unit) vehicle. It was offered in 2 trims, GL+ and GLX. The Pakistani Vitara features the same 6-speed automatic transmission with paddle shifters and the 1.6-litre petrol engine found in international market version, which produces 115 hp and 156 Nm of torque.

The Vitara was eventually discontinued in Pakistan due to poor sales and the brand's association with cheap, commuter kei cars.

=== Suzuki Wagon R ===
Pak Suzuki manufactures the Second generation Suzuki Wagon R (MP31S) in two different variants, both equipped with the same 996 cc Suzuki K10B engine offered in the Suzuki Cultus.

- Suzuki Wagon R VXR
- Suzuki Wagon R VXL (also offered as VXL AGS with automatic transmission)

On March 11, 2025, The company suspended bookings for Suzuki WagonR (all variants).

=== Suzuki Ravi ===
The Ravi pickup was launched in the late 1980s. The Ravi will be replaced by the Every pick-up.

== Motorcycles ==
As of 2023, Pak Suzuki sells four different motorcycles.

- Suzuki GD110S (4-stroke, 113 cc)
- Suzuki GSX125 (4-stroke, 125 cc)
- Suzuki GS150 (4-stroke, 150 cc)
- Suzuki GR150 (4-stroke, 150 cc)

== Future plans ==
In May 2024, Suzuki Motors expressed interest in establishing a biogas plant in Karachi, Pakistan.

== Gallery ==
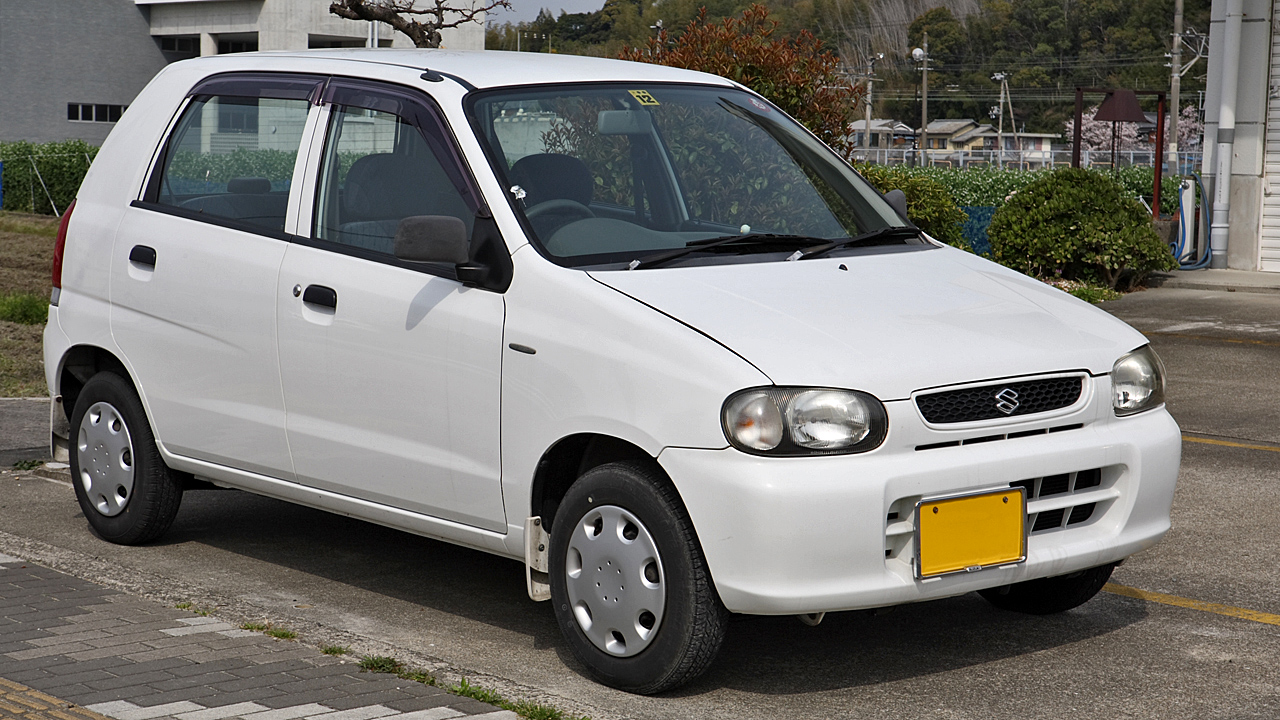
Suzuki Alto

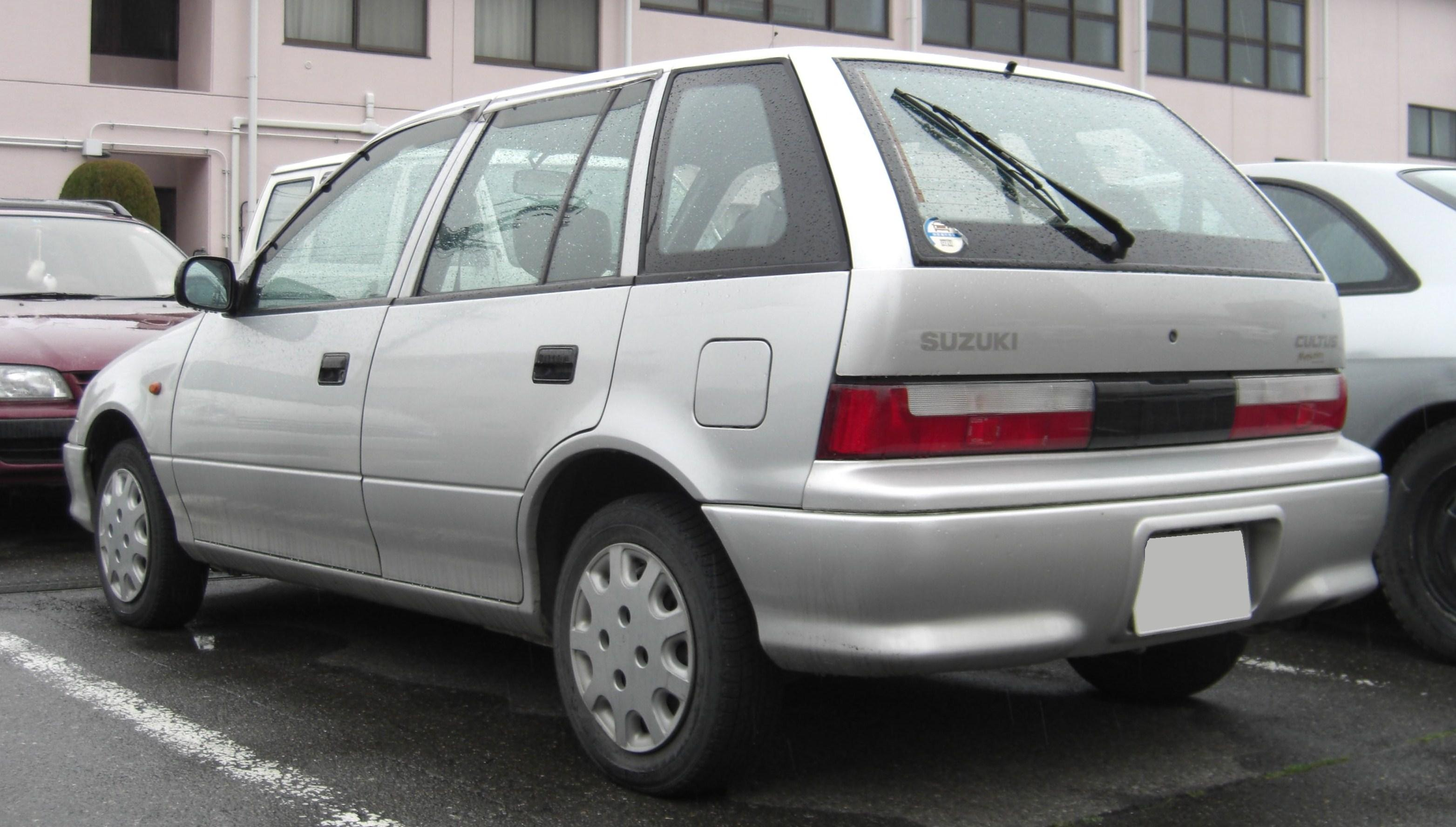
Suzuki Cultus

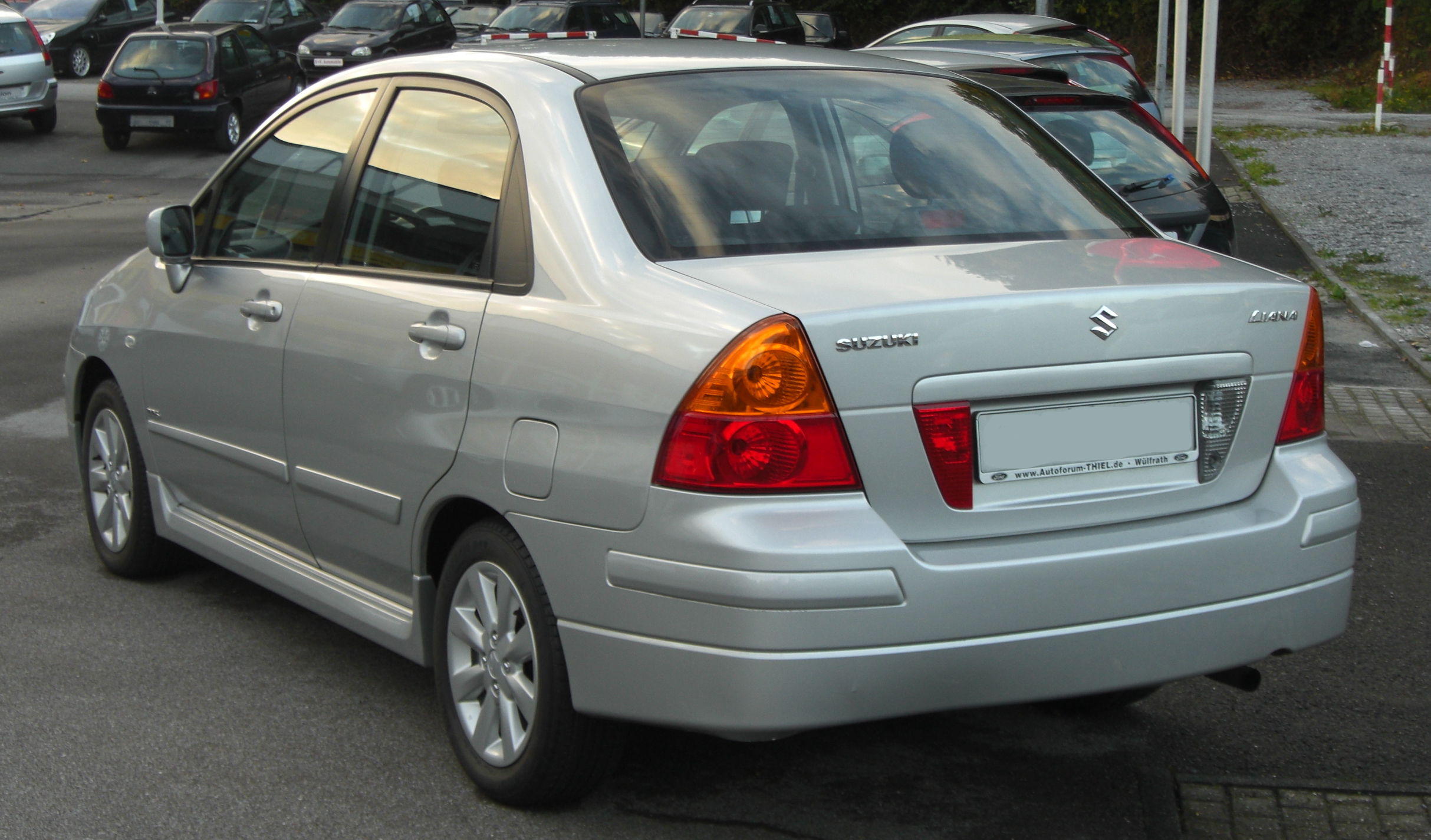
Suzuki Liana

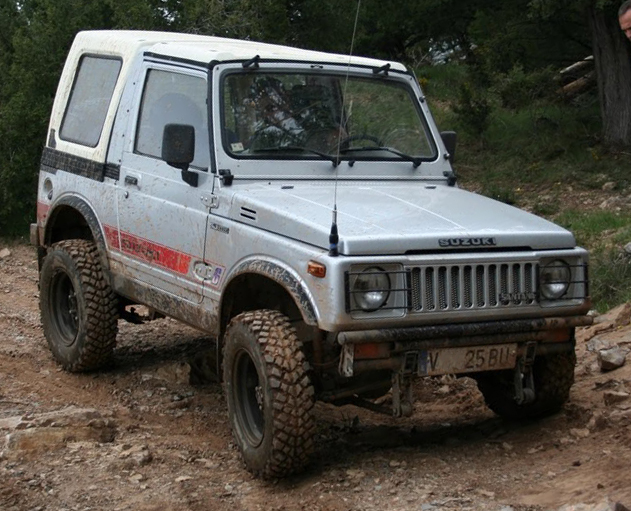
Santana built Suzuki Jimny

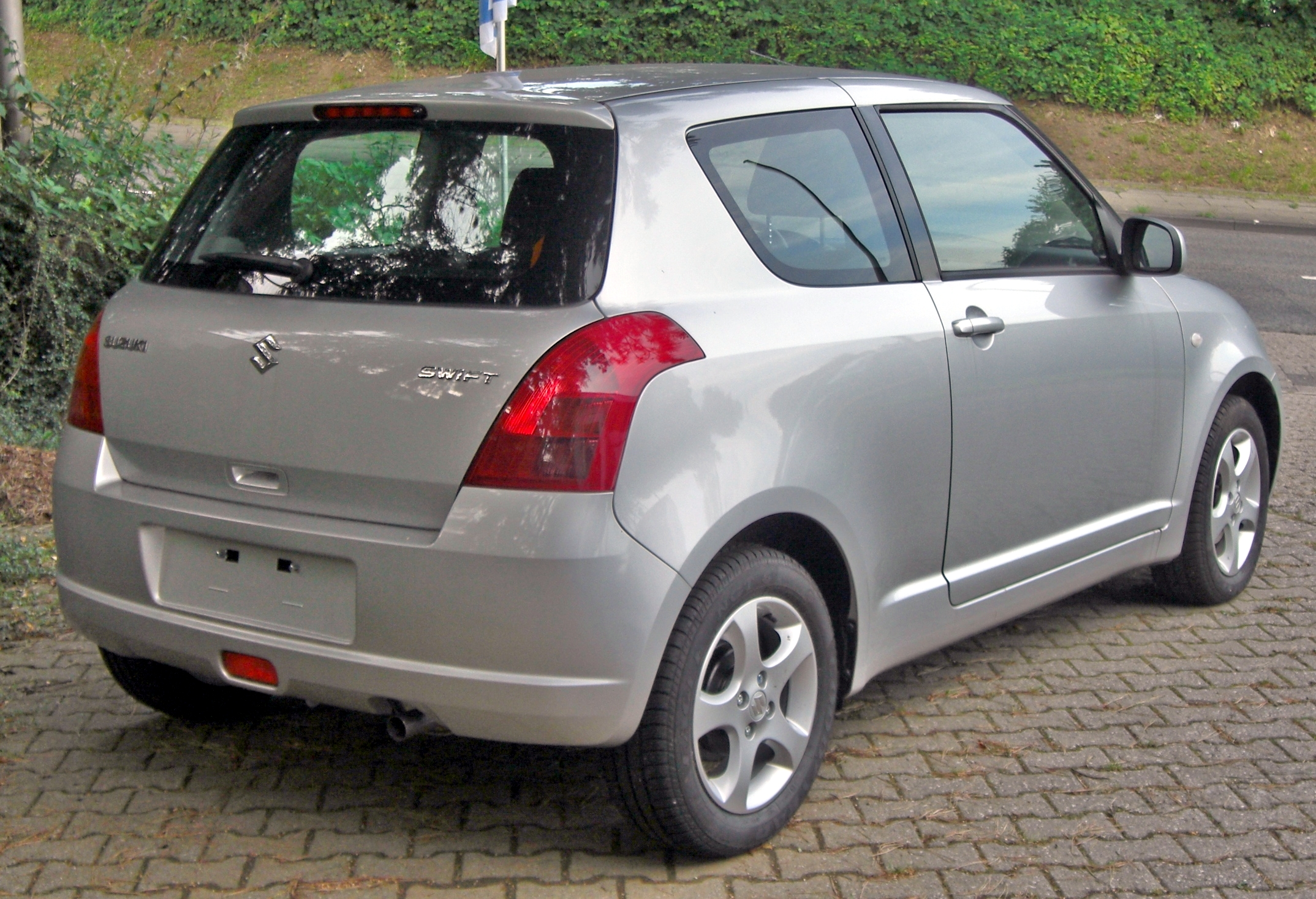
Suzuki Swift

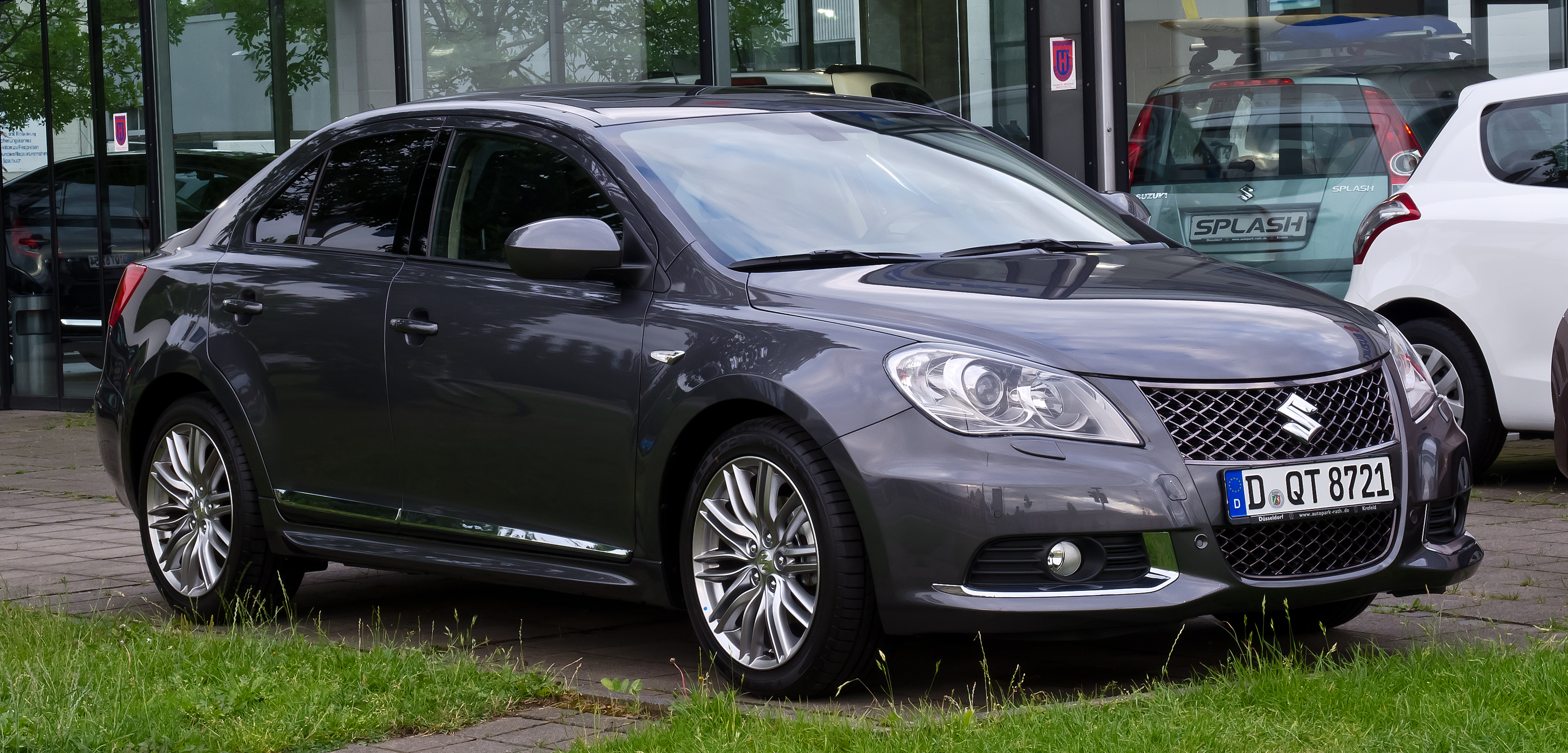
Suzuki Kizashi

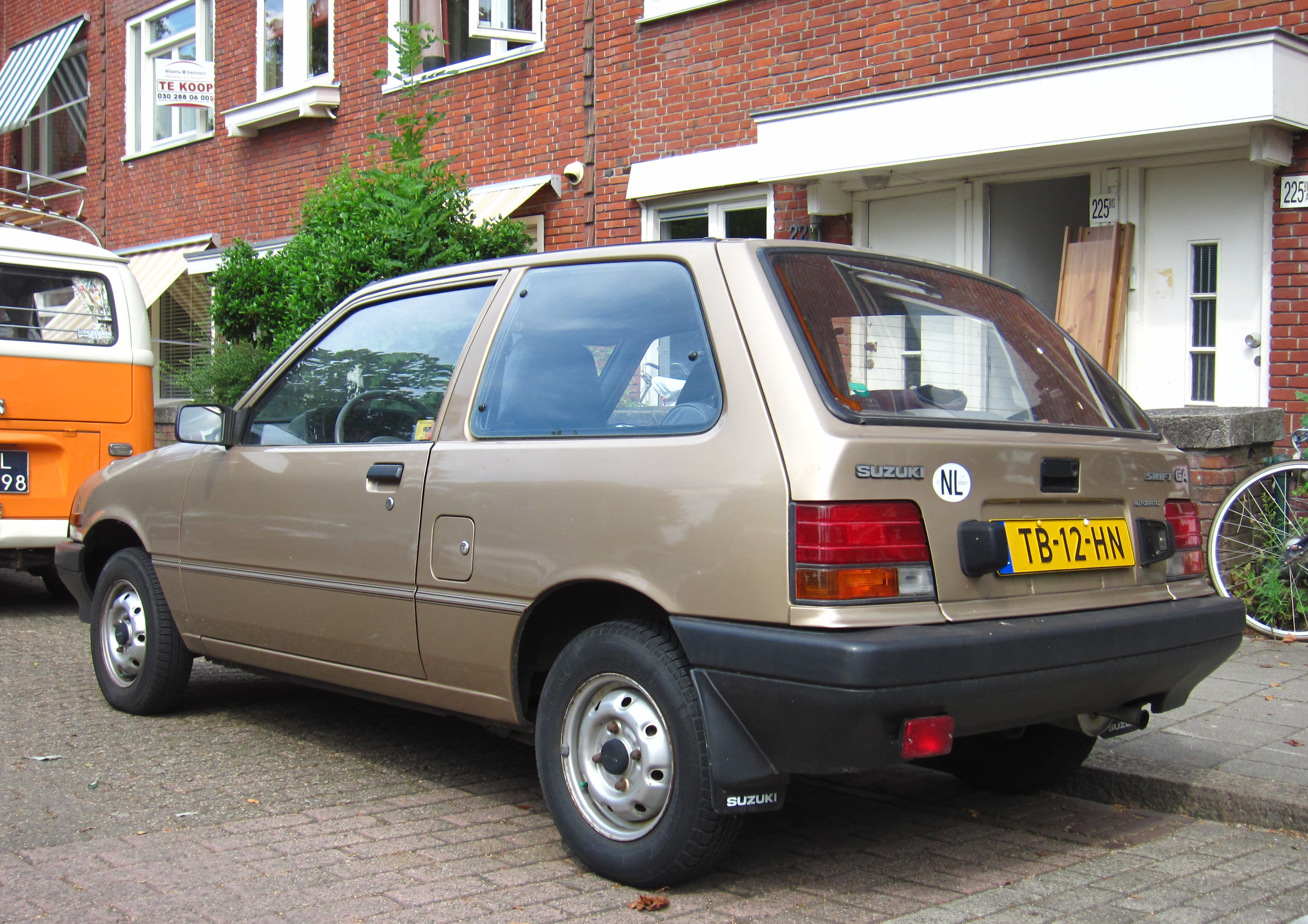
Suzuki Khyber

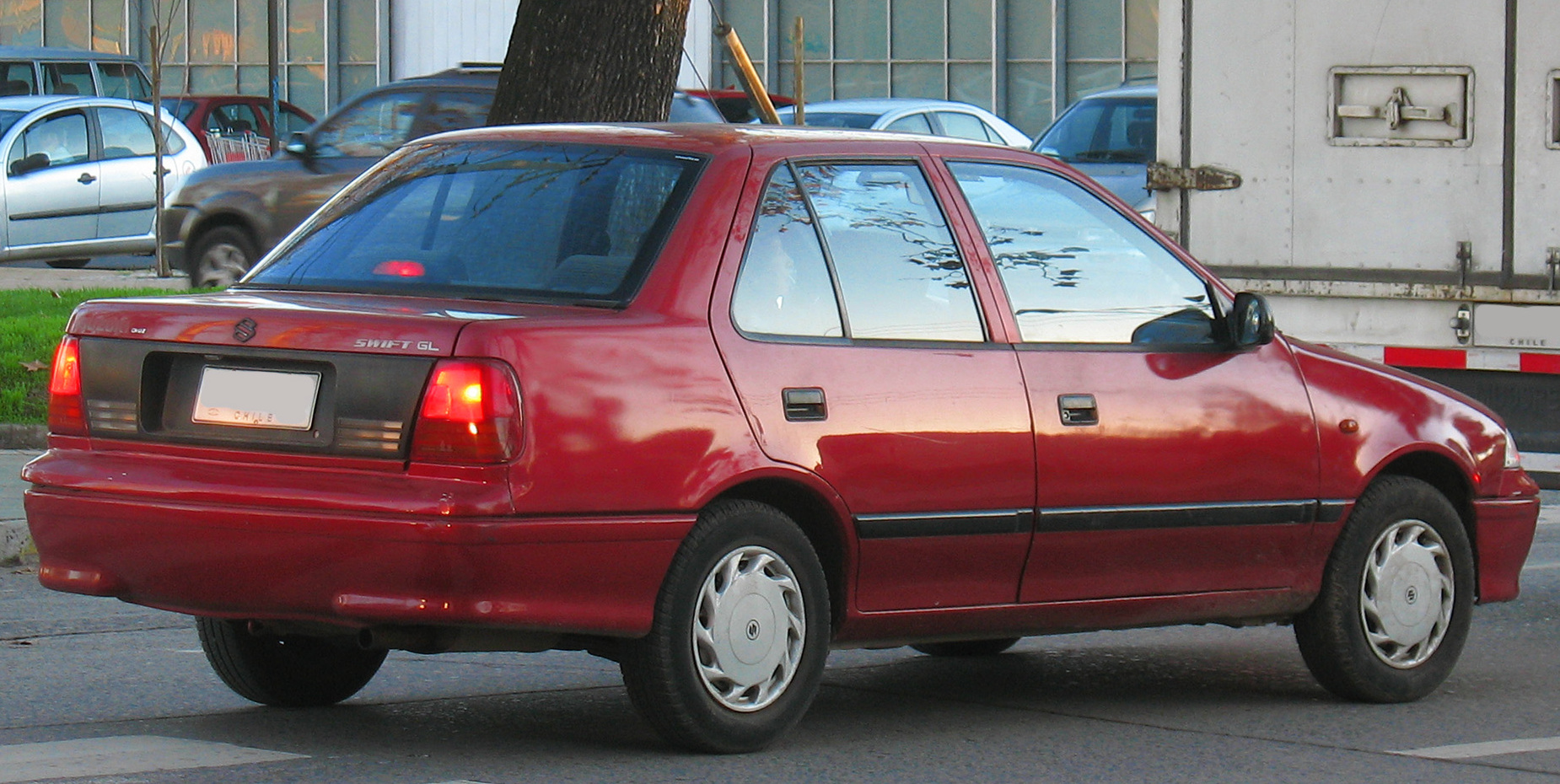
Rear view of second gen Suzuki Cultus sold as Suzuki Margalla

Suzuki FX

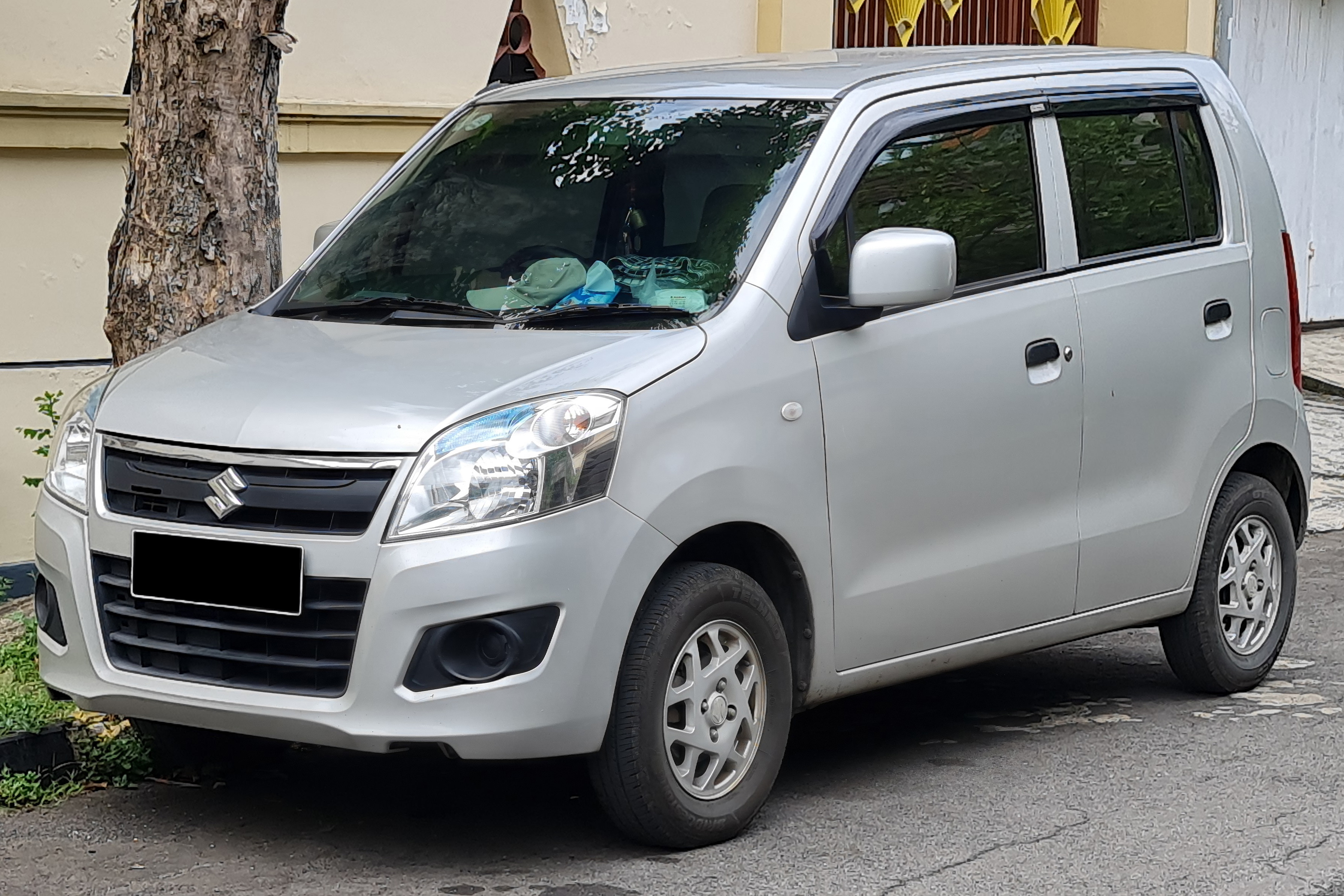
facelifted Pakistani Maruti Suzuki Wagon R

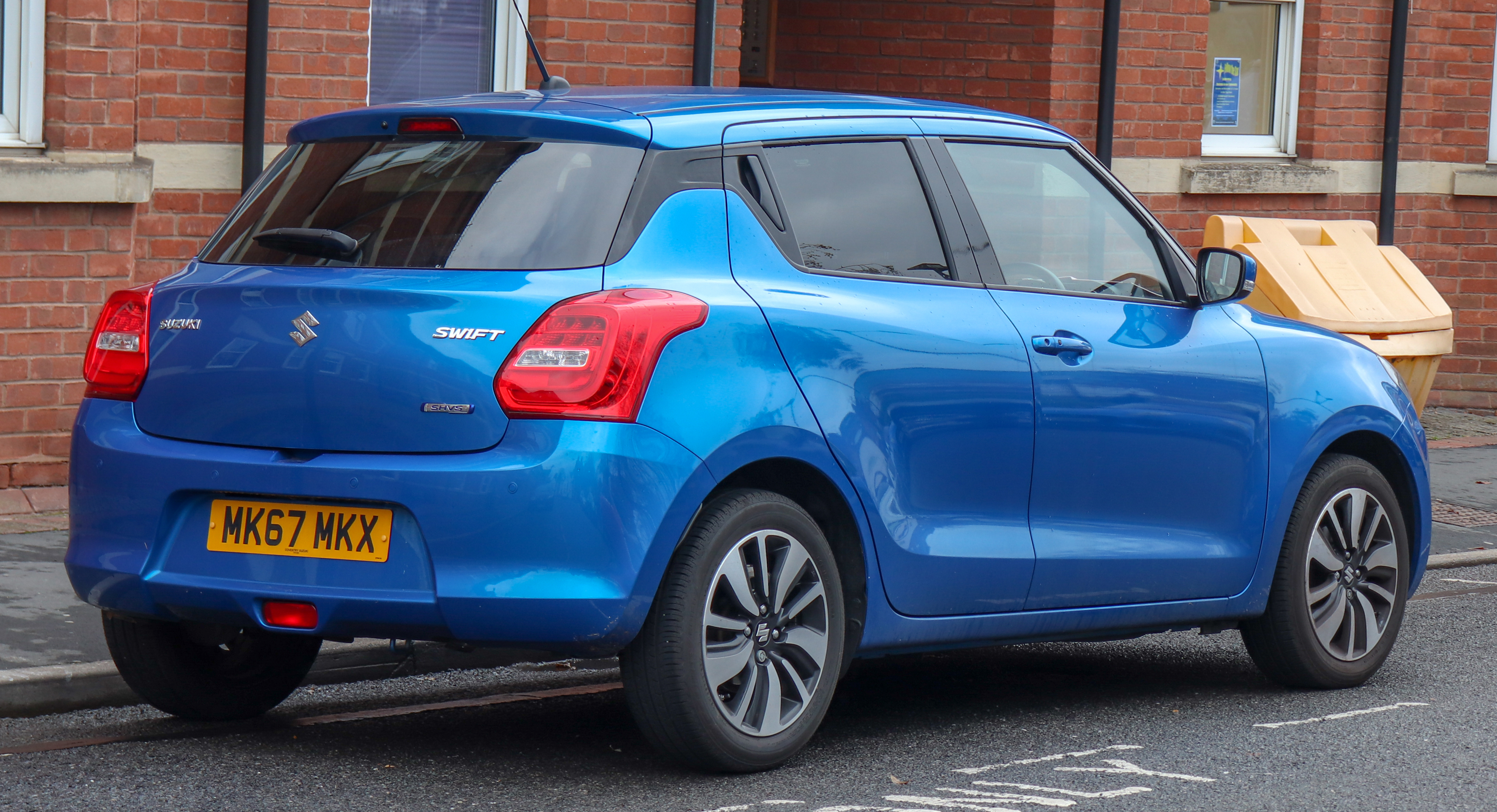
2nd gen Suzuki Swift in Pakistan (3rd gen Internationally)

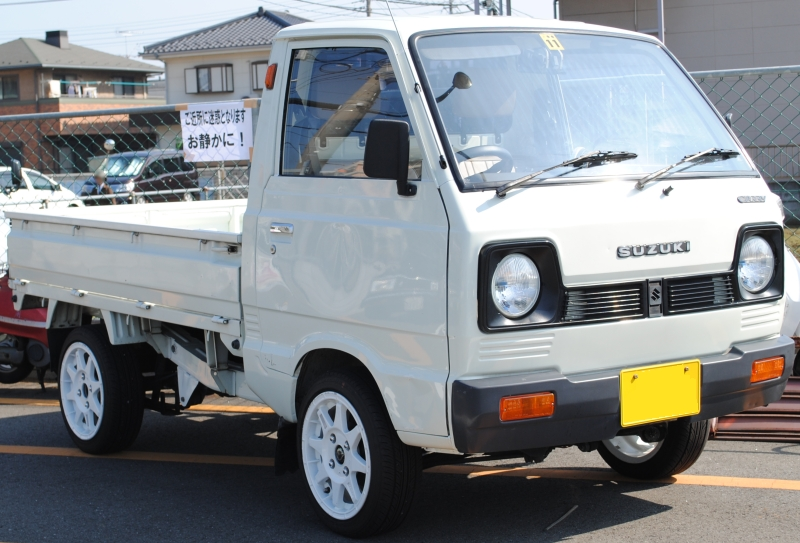
Suzuki Ravi

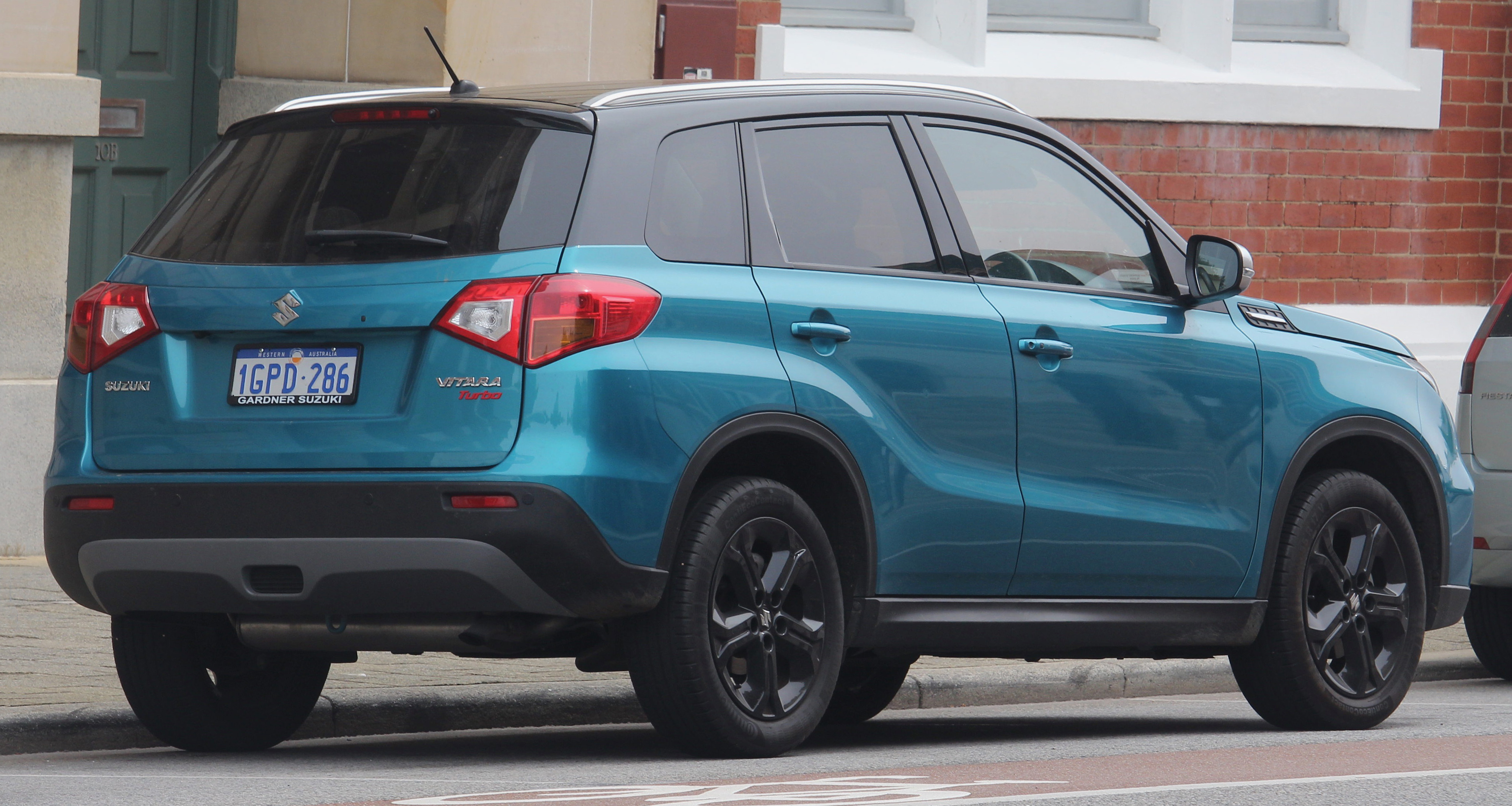
Rear view of Suzuki Vitara

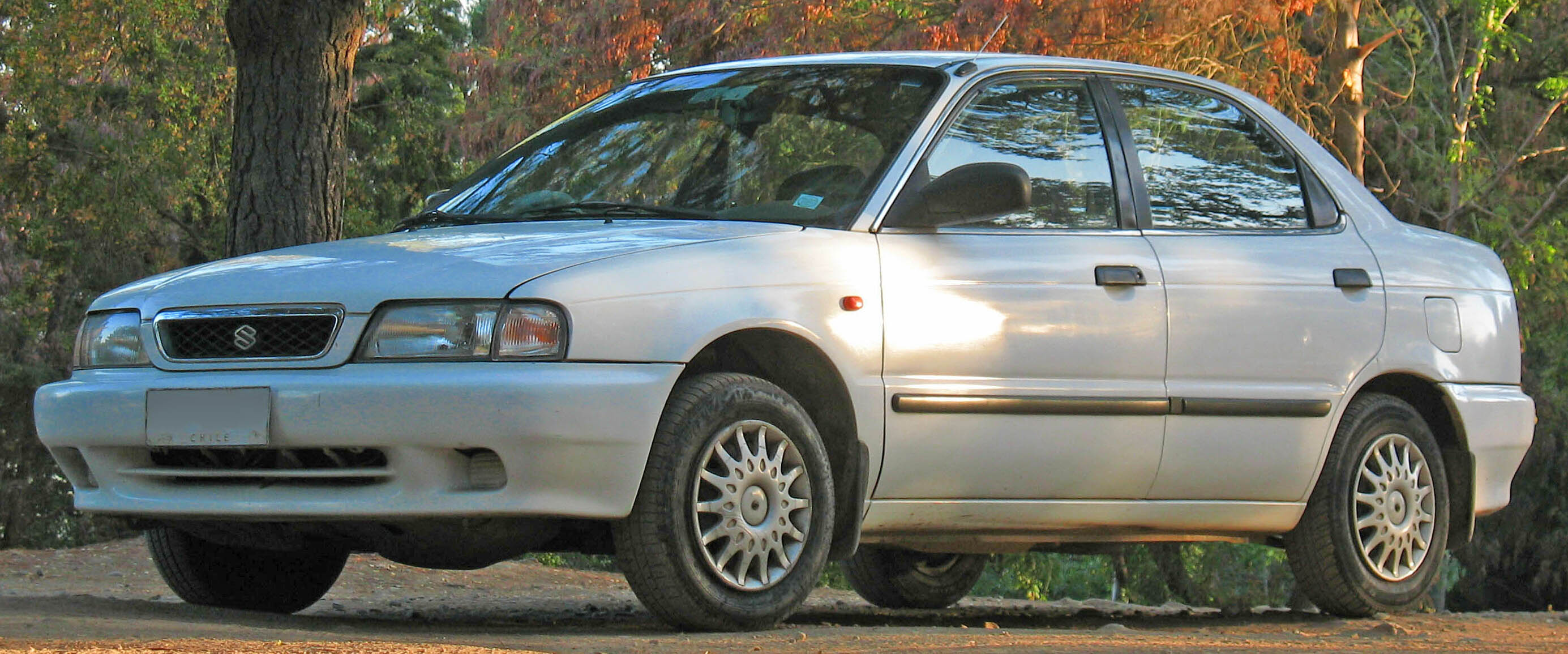
pre-facelift Suzuki Baleno

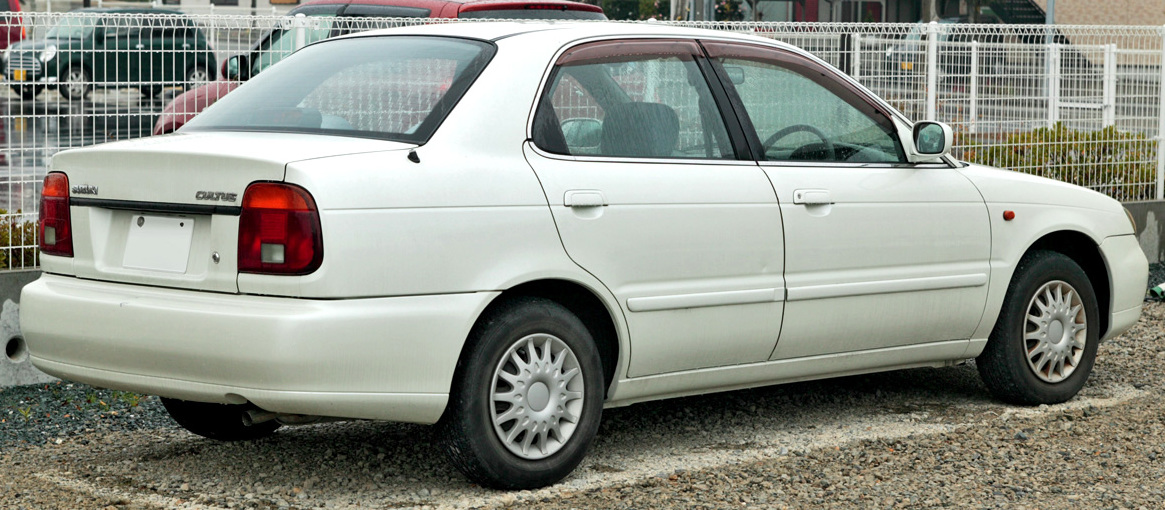
Rear view of Suzuki Baleno

== See also ==
- Automotive industry in Pakistan
