= Sigma Motors =

Sigma Motors Limited
- Type: Private Unlimited Company
- Industry: Automotive
- Founded: 1994
- Headquarters: Islamabad, Pakistan
- Key people: Syed Zafar Ud Din Ahmad (Chairman); Syed Zafar Uddin Ahmad (CEO)
- Products: Automobiles
- Website: www.sigmamotorspk.com

Sigma Motors Limited was founded in 1994 and is responsible for the marketing and assembly of Land Rover 4x4's in Pakistan. Sigma Motors uses idle capacity at the Ghandhara Nissan Limited plant at Port Qasim to assemble vehicles, under a contract assembly agreement with the Ministry of Defence. Defender being one of the toughest off-road vehicle is currently manufactured here. The assembly plant of Sigma Motors has annual production capacity of 2000 units.

== Products ==
=== Local assembly ===
- Land Rover Defender

=== Imported models ===
- Discovery
- Discovery Sport
- Range Rover
- Range Rover Evoque
- Range Rover Sport
- Range Rover Velar
