= VPL Limited =

- Company type: Subsidiary
- Industry: Automotive
- Founded: 1984
- Headquarters: Lahore, Punjab, Pakistan
- Key people: Faisal Sharif, CEO
- Products: Trucks, Buses, Construction and Mining
- Parent: Panasian Group
- Subsidiaries: Premval premval.com
- Website: vpl.com.pk volvotrucks.pk volvobuses.pk

VPL Limited, previously known as Volvo Pakistan Limited, sells bus and truck in Pakistan. The company is a joint venture between the Panasian Group and Volvo. VPL used to be the authorized assembler and manufacturer of Volvo Trucks and Volvo Buses in Pakistan, but the assembly plant shut down in the 1980s. Since then, VPL has remained the sole authorized distributor of Volvo equipment in Pakistan, not only limited to Trucks and Buses but also including Construction and Mining Equipment, Gensets and Industrial Tools. The company's Head Office is located at 23-Km Multan Road, Lahore, Pakistan.

== History ==
Volvo Pakistan began operating in 1984, and had a brief venture with the Government of Pakistan to manufacture Volvo vehicles. Over 660 Volvo vehicles were upgraded to be used in Pakistan's urban transport sector. Local body manufacturers were engaged in developing bodies of new Volvo units. By 1994, the project started facing mismanagement issues. Shortly after, Volvo left the Pakistani market, accusing the government of not investing enough in its road infrastructure. All buses were gradually disposed-off at Volvo Pakistan's Multan Road plant in Lahore. On 21 February 2016, Volvo Pakistan announced it was re-entering the Pakistani market.

== Brands/Products ==
=== Buses ===
- Volvo Buses

=== Trucks ===
- Volvo Trucks
- UD Trucks

=== Construction & Mining Equipment ===
- Volvo Construction Equipment
- Sandvik
- Carmix

=== Power Equipment ===
- Volvo Penta
- ONIS Visa
