= Adam Revo =

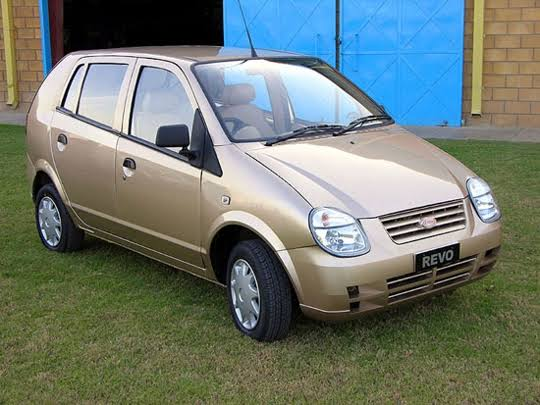

Overview
- Manufacturer: Adam Motor Company
- Production: 2005–2006
- Assembly: Karachi, Pakistan

Body and chassis
- Class: City car
- Body style: 5-door hatchback
- Layout: Front-engine, front-wheel-drive

Powertrain
- Engine: 0.8L OHC I4; 1.05 L OHC I4
- Transmission: 4-speed manual 5-speed manual

Dimensions
- Wheelbase: 2,357 mm (92.8 in)
- Length: 3,576 mm (140.8 in)
- Width: 1,510 mm (59.4 in)
- Height: 1,470 mm (57.9 in)

The Adam Revo was a city car made by Adam Motor Company of Pakistan. It was the first car to be designed and assembled in Pakistan and was launched in 2005. The car was fitted with Chinese-originated engines that were supplied by Wuling Motors.

The name "REVO" was derived from the word revolution, which was what the car was supposed to make. However, production stopped by September 2006 due to unavailability of funds and lack of government support. Only 600 cars were sold.

There were two variants available, equipped with two different Chinese made engines; the Revo 80 (0.8L) and Revo 105 (1.05L).

The Revo was envisaged to be between 10% and 15% cheaper than other local competitors, mainly the Mehran 800, which dominates Pakistan's automobile industry.

== Specification ==
Engine

- Revo 80: 797 cc straight-4 OHC petrol engine with carburetor – 35 PS (26 kW; 35 hp) at 5500 rpm, 52 N⋅m (38 lb⋅ft) at 3000 rpm
- Revo 105: 1051 cc straight-4 OHC petrol engine with Fuel injection – 56 PS (41 kW; 55 hp) at 5500 rpm, 83 N⋅m (61 lb⋅ft) at 3000 rpm

Suspension

- Front: Strut with Coil spring
- Rear: Leaf spring with Shock absorber

Brakes

- Front: Disc with booster
- Rear: Drum

Drive Type Front Engine Front Wheel Drive (FWD).

== Model ranges ==
- 80std
- 80s
- 80+ (with CNG option)
- 105i
- 105i+ (with CNG option)
- 105is
- 105is+ (with CNG option)
