= Honda Atlas Cars =

Pakistani automobile manufacturer

Honda Atlas Cars Pakistan Ltd.
- Type: Joint venture
- Traded as: PSX: HCAR; KSE 100 component
- Industry: Automotive
- Founded: 1992
- Headquarters: Lahore, Pakistan
- Key people: Masaya Wakuda (CEO); Aamir H. Shirazi (Chairman)
- Products: Automobiles
- Revenue: ▼ Rs. 95.1 billion (US$340 million) (2023)
- Operating income: ▼ Rs. 2.3 billion (US$8.2 million) (2023)
- Net income: ▼ Rs. 260 million (US$930,000) (2023)
- Total assets: ▼ Rs. 62.7 billion (US$220 million) (2023)
- Total equity: ▼ Rs. 19.2 billion (US$69 million) (2023)
- Parent: Honda (51%); Atlas Group (30%)
- Website: honda.com.pk

Honda Atlas Cars Pakistan is a Pakistani automobile manufacturer which is a subsidiary of Japanese car maker Honda. It was founded in 1992 as a joint venture between Honda Motor and Atlas Group. It is based in Lahore, Pakistan.

The company stock is traded on the Pakistan Stock Exchange.

Honda Atlas is the authorised assembler and manufacturer of Honda vehicles in Pakistan.

== History ==
Honda Atlas was incorporated on 4 November 1992, while the joint venture agreement was signed on 5 August 1993. The manufacturing plant was inaugurated 17 April 1993 and the first car rolled off the assembly line on 26 May 1994. By July 1994, six dealerships were established in Karachi, Lahore, and Islamabad. In October 1994, it was listed on the Karachi Stock Exchange.

== Products ==
=== Current Vehicles ===
==== Sedans ====
- Honda City
- Honda Civic

==== SUVs & MPVs ====
- Honda HR-V

=== Former Vehicles ===
- Honda BR-V

=== Completely Built Units (CBU) ===
- Honda Accord
- Honda CR-V

== See also ==
- Automotive industry in Pakistan
- Atlas Group
- Honda
