= Volkswagen Up =

German city car

Volkswagen up!
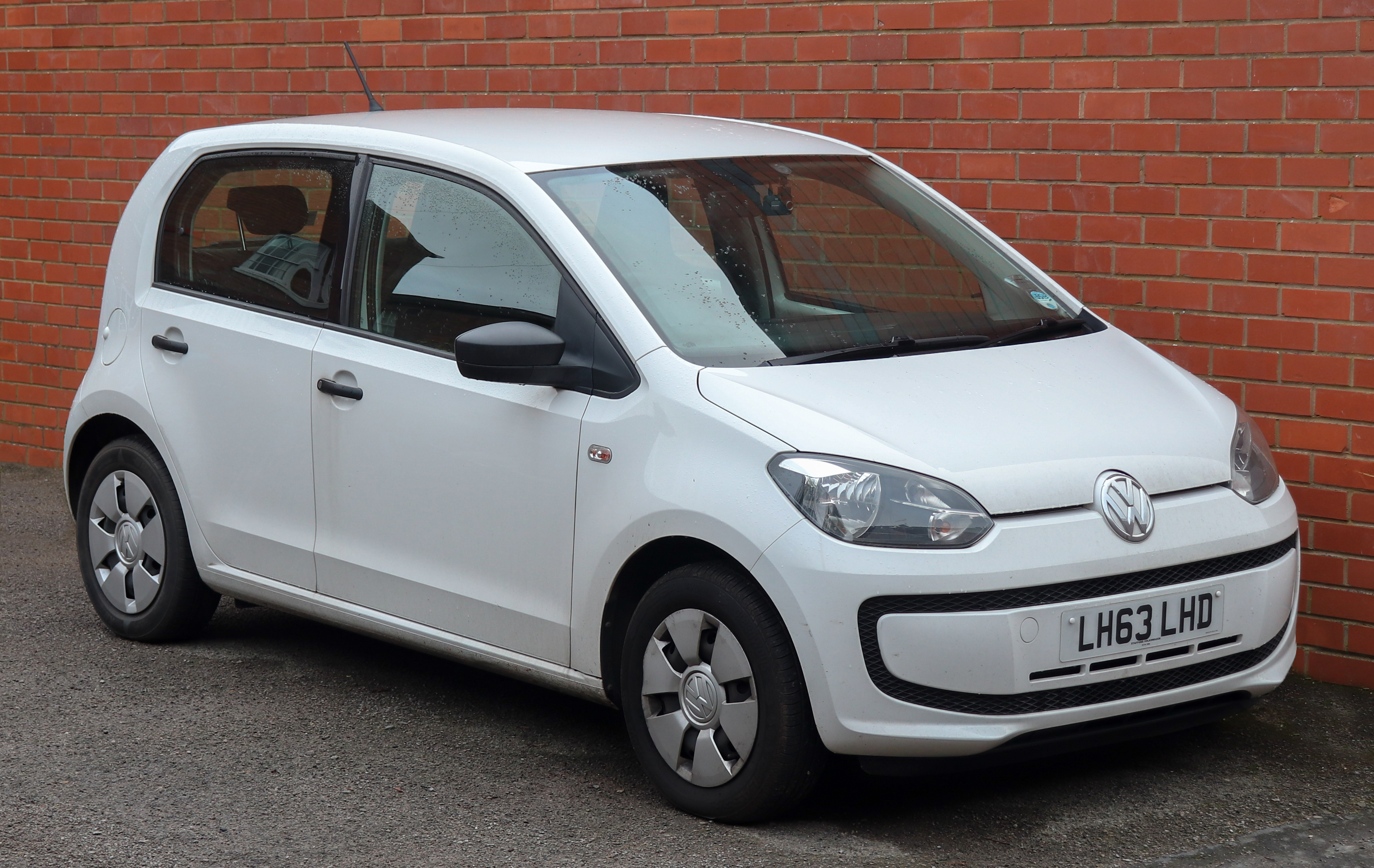
- Volkswagen up! 5-door (pre-facelift)

Overview
- Manufacturer: Volkswagen
- Also called: Škoda Citigo; SEAT Mii
- Production: November-December 2011–2023 (Volkswagen up!); 2011–2020 (Škoda Citigo); 2011–2021 (SEAT Mii); 2014–2021 (Brazil)
- Assembly: Slovakia: Bratislava (Volkswagen Bratislava Plant); Brazil: Taubaté (Volkswagen do Brasil)
- Designer: Klaus Bischoff, Oliver Stefani and Marco Antonio Pavone

Body and chassis
- Class: City car (A)
- Body style: 3-door hatchback 5-door hatchback
- Layout: Front-engine, front-wheel-drive
- Platform: Volkswagen Group NSF

Powertrain
- Engine: Petrol: 1.0 L MPI I3; 1.0 L TSI I3; Petrol/CNG: 1.0 L MPI I3
- Electric motor: Permanent magnet synchronous motor
- Transmission: 5-speed manual 6-speed manual 5-speed ASG automated manual 1-speed fixed gear ratio (electric)

Dimensions
- Wheelbase: 2,420 mm (95.3 in)
- Length: 3,540–3,563 mm (139.4–140.3 in)
- Width: 1,641 mm (64.6 in)
- Height: 1,478–1,489 mm (58.2–58.6 in)
- Kerb weight: 929–997 kg (2,048–2,198 lb)

Chronology
- Predecessor: Volkswagen Fox; SEAT Arosa

The Volkswagen Up (stylized as Volkswagen up!) is a city car which was produced by the Volkswagen Group from 2011 to 2023. It is part of the New Small Family (NSF) series of models, alongside the SEAT Mii and Škoda Citigo which are rebadged versions of the Up, with slightly different front and rear fascias. Production began in December 2011 at the Volkswagen Plant in Bratislava, Slovakia, with Volkswagen do Brasil making the model in Taubaté from February 2014 until 2021. The SEAT and Škoda versions were also manufactured in the Bratislava factory, before being withdrawn from sale in 2021 and 2020 respectively. Production of the Up ended in October 2023. A battery electric version, called E-up, was launched in autumn 2013.

== Overview ==
=== Pre-production ===
The production Up follows a series of concept cars, starting in 2007 at the Frankfurt Motor Show. The exterior was originally designed by the Brazilian designer Marco Pavone. This design was chosen and enhanced by Volkswagen Group Chief Designer Walter de'Silva, and Head Designer of the Volkswagen Passenger Cars marque, Klaus Zyciora. Shown at the Frankfurt launch were several further Up concepts, including a 98 hp (73 kW) GT version, a natural gas-powered Eco-up! (with CO_{2} emissions of 79 g/km) and a four-door Cross model.

Where the Up concept used a rear-engine, rear-wheel drive layout, the 2011 production model has a front-engine, front-wheel drive layout, using the NSF platform, with a 3-cylinder 1.0-litre petrol engine.

It was originally reported that the Up concept would be produced under the name Lupo, like the Volkswagen Lupo that was discontinued in 2005. Eventually this plan changed and the 2011 production model was named the Up.

=== Production version ===
At the International Motor Show Germany in 2011, Volkswagen unveiled the final version of the Up based on the Volkswagen New Small Family (NSF) modular architecture. Production of the Up started with the model year of 2012, in December 2011 at the Volkswagen Plant in Bratislava, Slovakia. The three-door bodywork is inspired by the 2007 concept Up, the engine range is 1.0-litre three-cylinder gasoline 60 hp (45 kW) and 75 hp (56 kW). Both the three and five doors are available with engines running on CNG and called eco-Up. The Up is a front-wheel drive with transverse engine mated to a five-speed manual gearbox and is 3.54 metres (139 in) long has a wheelbase of 2.42 m (95 in). The cabin is configured to four seats.

The Up range included the Up GTI, which was previewed by the GT Up concept. Released in January 2018, the Up GTI feature a turbocharged version of the 1.0-litre three-cylinder engine producing 115 PS (113 bhp; 85 kW). An electric hybrid Up — which would be badged Blue-e-motion — was planned for 2014 but never released.

Along with the other two rebadged models, Up is the first car in its class to offer an automated braking system, called City Emergency Braking. The system is automatically activated at speeds below 30 km/h (19 mph), when a laser sensor identifies a danger of collision and activates the brakes. In the SEAT model, the system is marketed as the City Safety Assist and in the Škoda model it is called City Safe Drive.

The Up won the 2012 World Car of the Year.

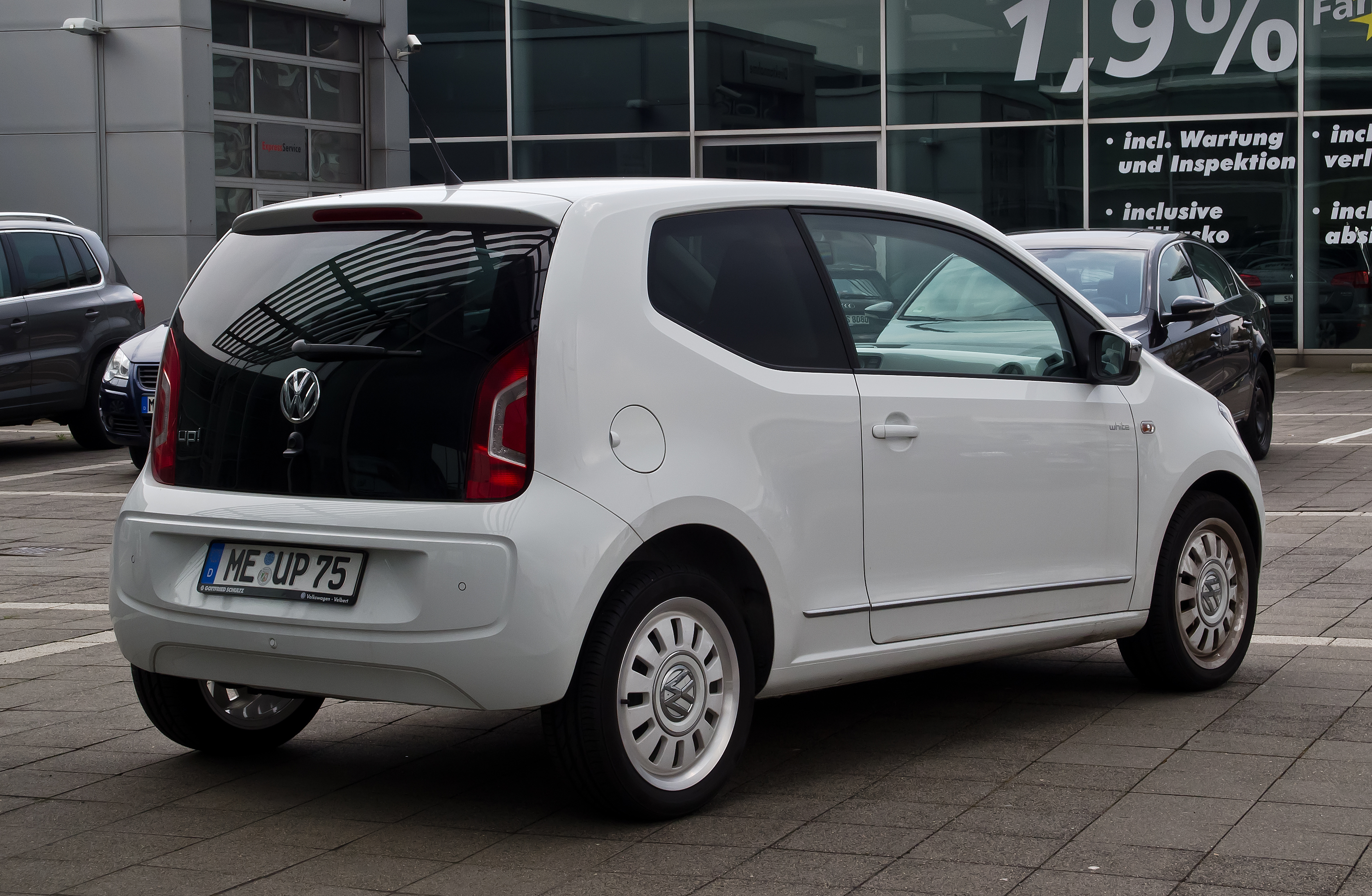
Rear view (3-door)

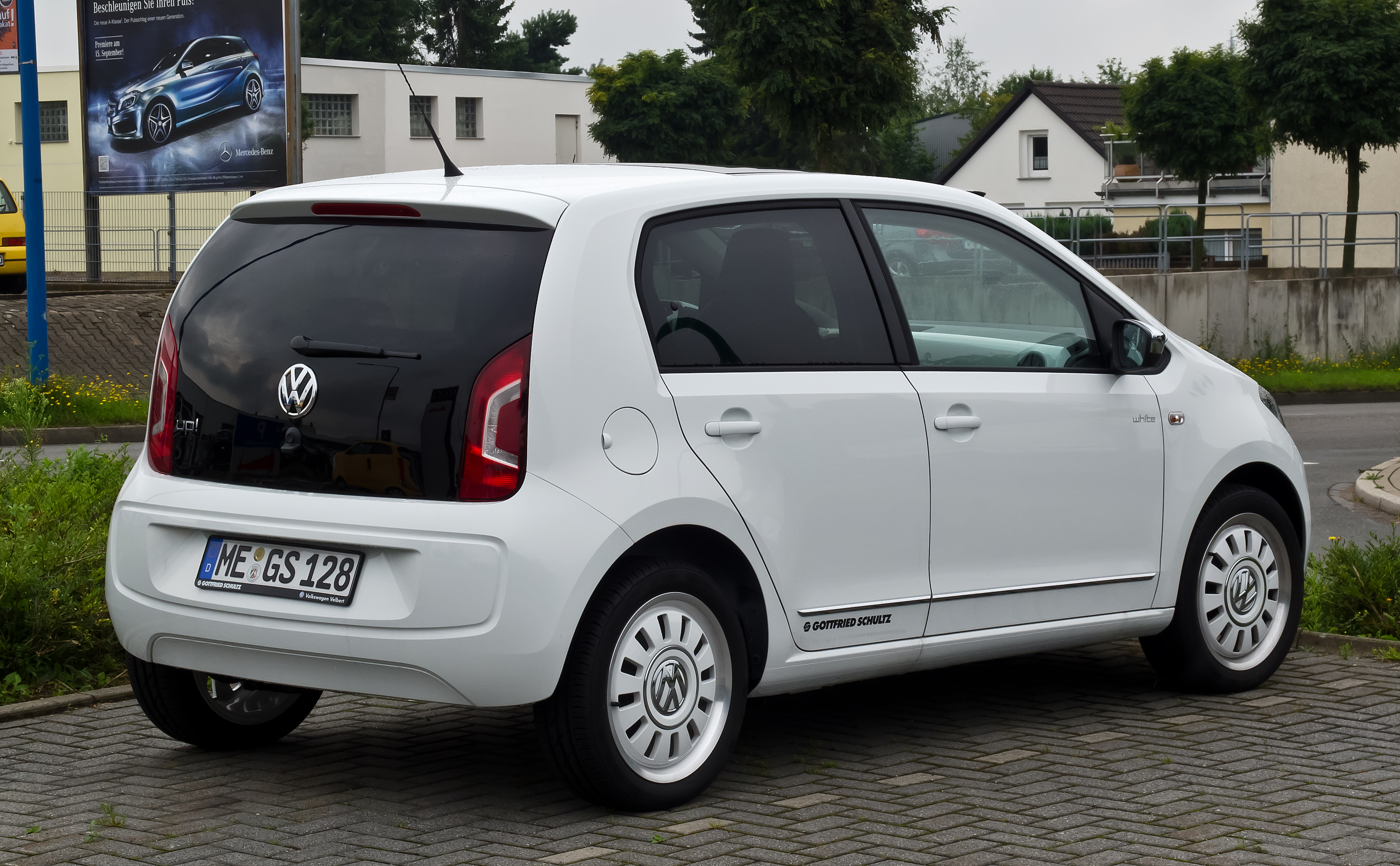
Rear view (5-door)

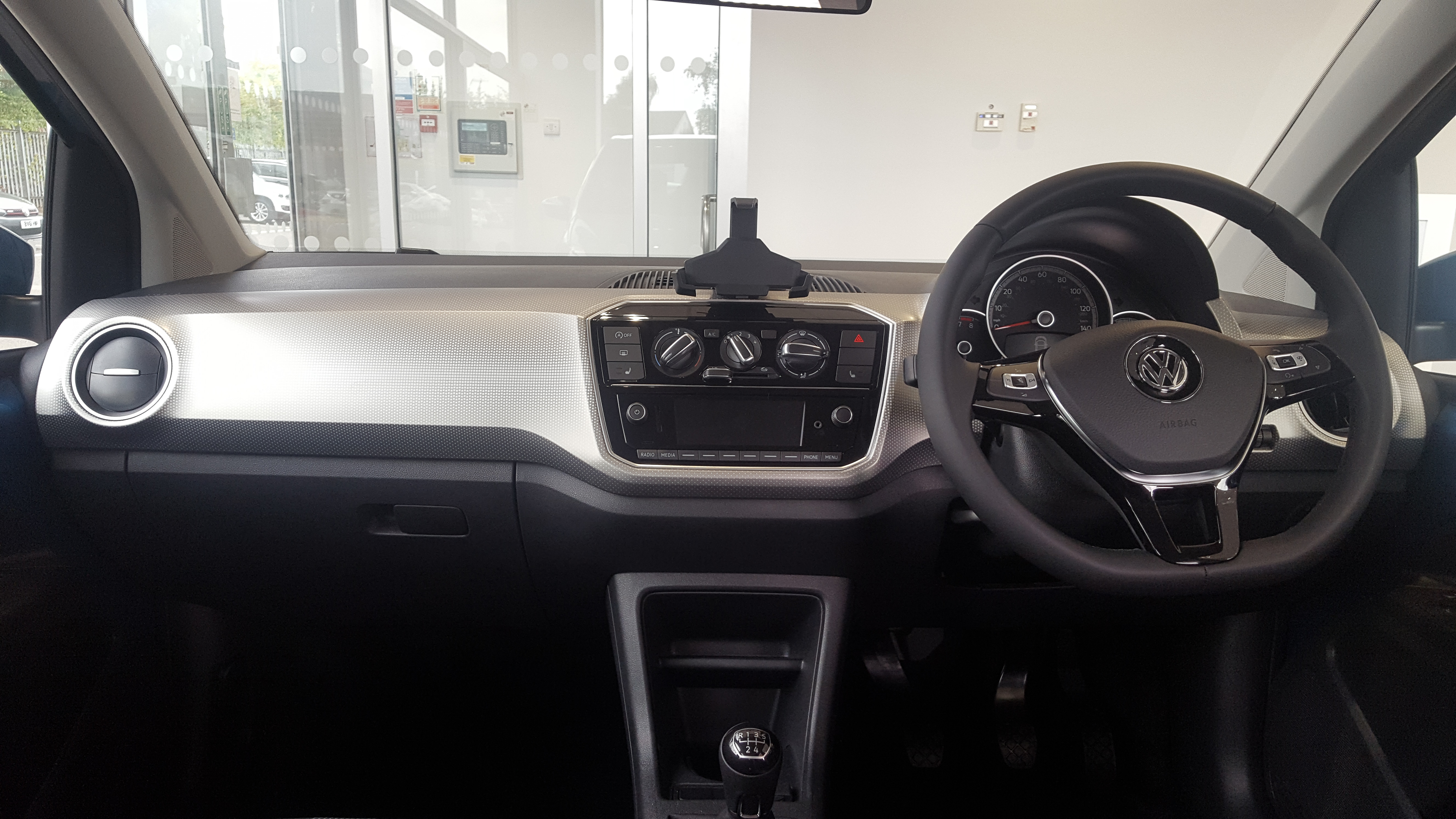
Interior

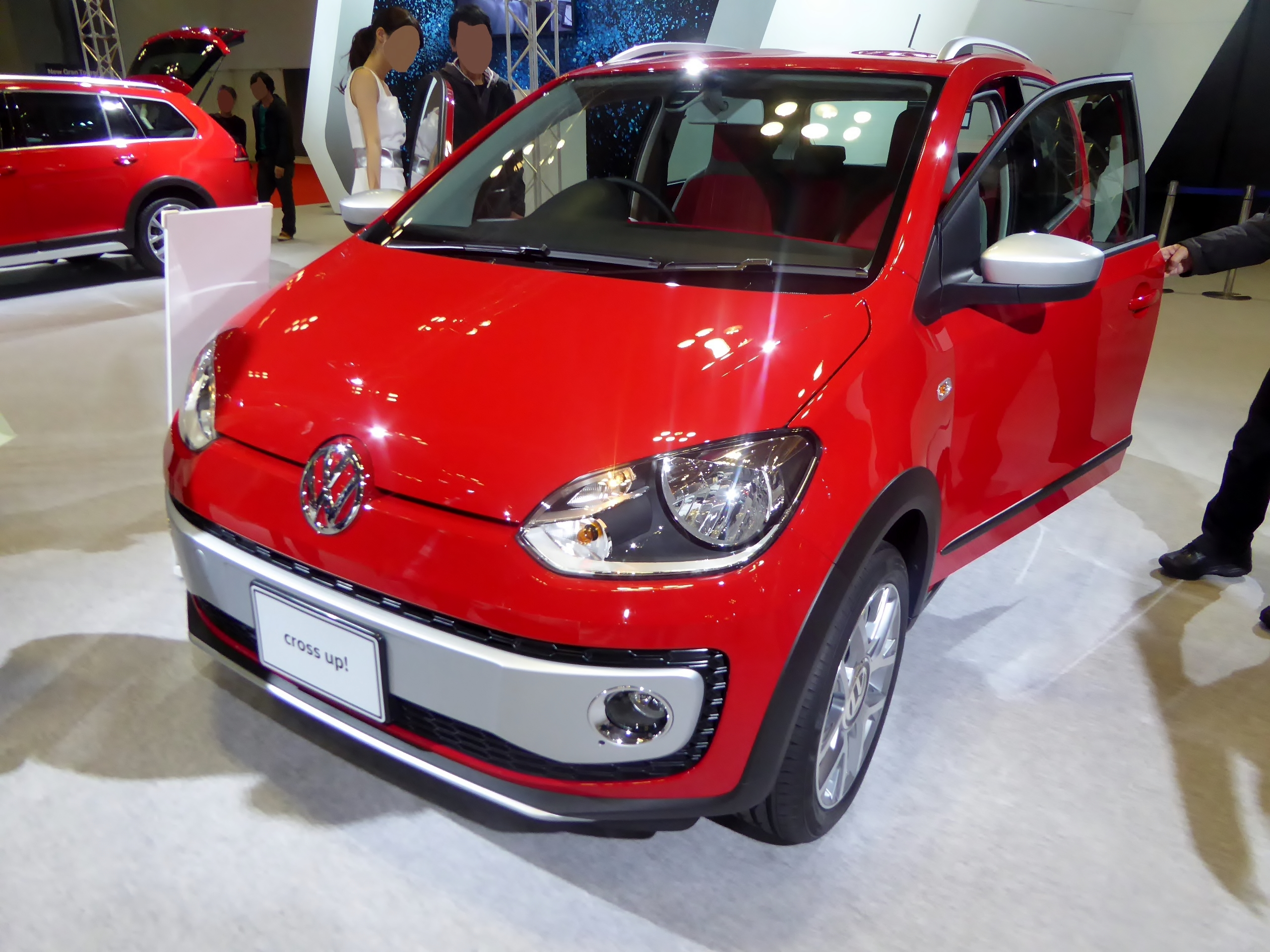
Cross Up

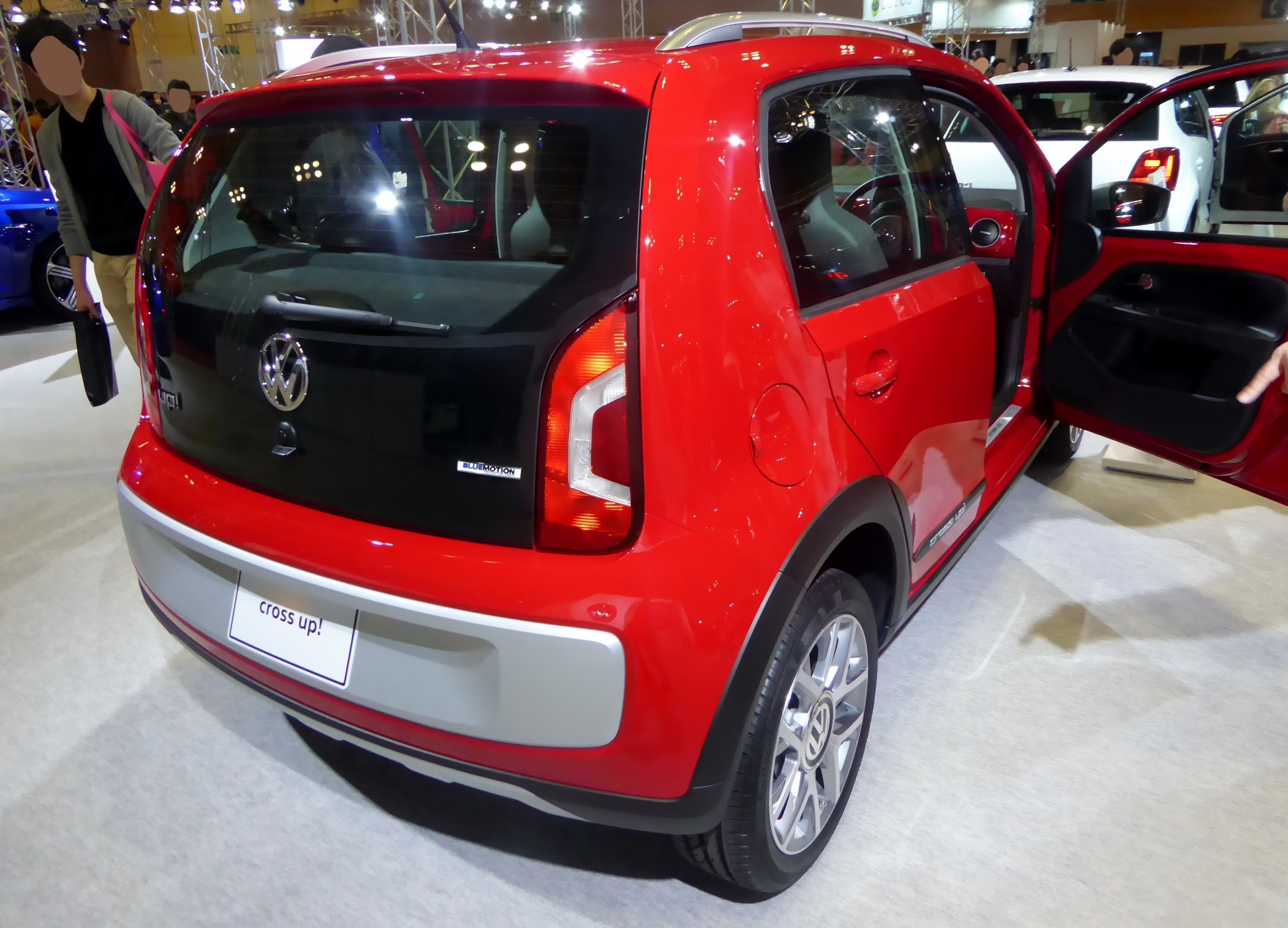
Rear view (Cross Up)

== Marketing ==
The Up! is available to order in the United Kingdom since October 2011 for five models – marketed as Take Up, Move Up, High Up, Up Black and Up White. British television show Top Gear presenters mocked the unusual name by calling the model "Up-exclamation-mark".

The Up was introduced on the German market on 3 December 2011. Deliveries to other European markets began in April 2012.

In 2013, Volkswagen introduced the cross up! model, which has 15 mm (0.59 in) more ground clearance than the standard model, and comes with plastic side skirts and wheel-arch flares as standard.

In 2014, at the Geneva Motor Show, Seat presented the 2014 Seat Mii by Mango model aimed towards women, made in collaboration with the Spanish fashion company Mango.

The SEAT Mii limited production started in October 2011 for the European market, with sales having started at the end of 2011. The final version was launched in May 2012.

The Up was sold in Australia until 2015, when it was withdrawn due to slow sales. Plans for the Škoda Citigo to be sold in Australia were also shelved.

At the Geneva Motor Show in 2016, the model sold in Europe received a facelift and the new TSI engine, that went on sale in the summer the same year.

The Up was not sold in North America, CIS countries, Middle East, India, China, South Korea, and Southeast Asia. Japanese sales began in October 2012. Due to its small size, the Up was one of Volkswagen's successful introduction in Japan. The Up was also launched in South Africa in March 2015. Two models were offered at launch, both are the 1.0-litre 55 kW (74 hp) three-door variant. The two local options were marketed as Take Up, and the Move Up.

=== Latin America ===
In February 2014, Volkswagen introduced a modified version of the Up for Latin America. Built in Brazil, the Latin American Up differs from its European counterpart in length (it is 65 mm (2.6 in) longer), thanks to revisions to the floorpan's rear section to accommodate a larger fuel tank (50 L instead of Europe's 35 L), a full-sized spare wheel and increased cargo space. All versions have revised tailgates with a painted metal section (like the Seat Mii's and Škoda Citigo's) instead of the dark glass trim used in Europe. The five-door Brazilian Up also uses a different rear door design with sectioned glass and wind-down windows. The South American model retains the European version's safety levels with a five-star crash rating and ample use of high-strength steel elements.

In July 2015, Volkswagen introduced a new powertrain for the Up sold in Brazil, using a 1.0-litre, direct fuel injection three-cylinder turbocharged engine.

Latin America-spec 3-door Up

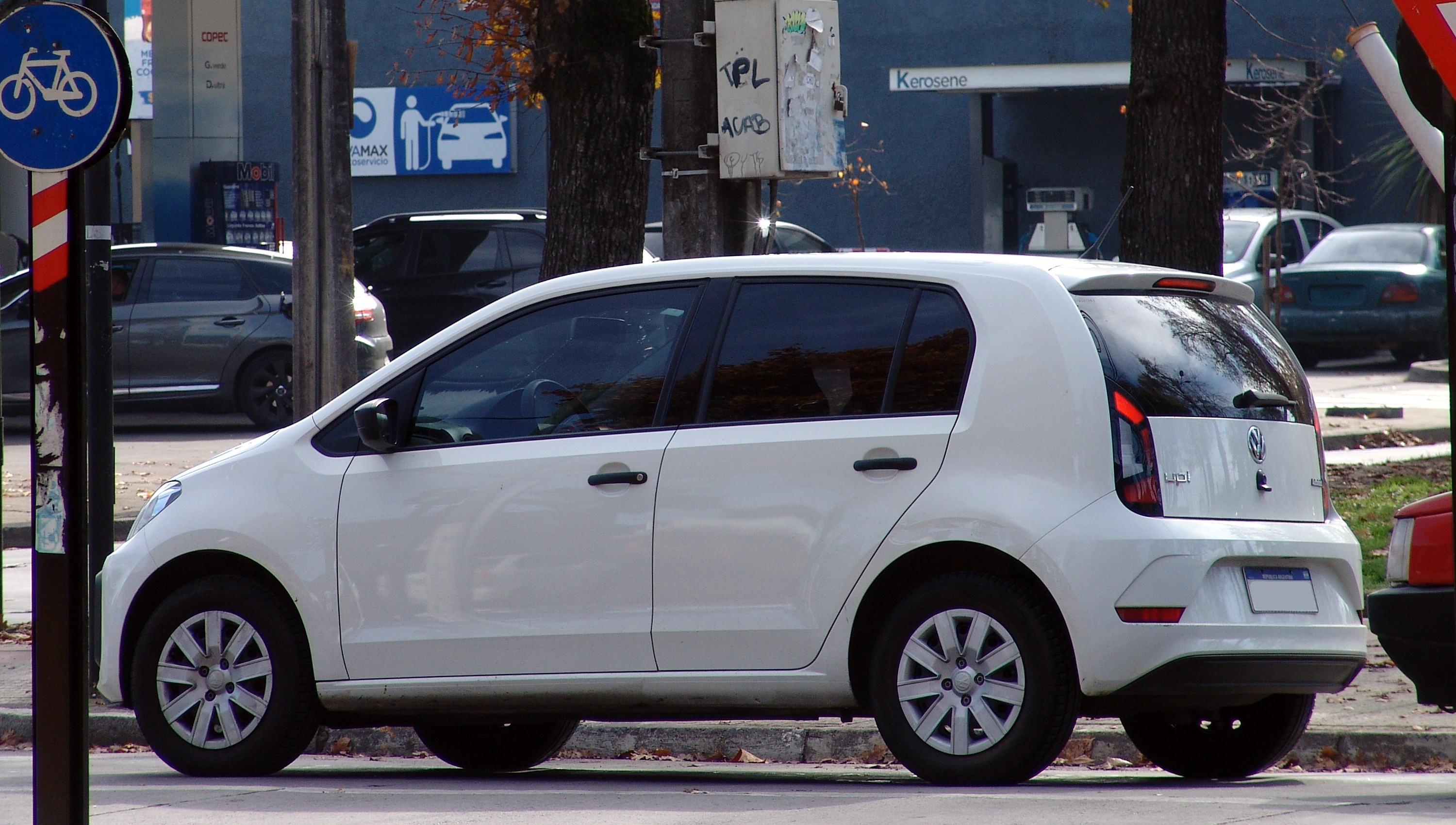
Latin America-spec 5-door Up

== Up GTI ==
In mid-December 2016, Volkswagen presented the Up GTI. It is powered by a 1.0-litre three-cylinder TSI petrol engine, which produces 115 PS (113 bhp; 85 kW). It is capable of accelerating 0–100 km/h (0–62 mph) in 8.8 seconds with a top speed of 196.00 km/h (121.79 mph). Weighing just 997 kg (2,198 lb), Volkswagen claims that it is capable of delivering between 49.6 mpg_{‑imp} (5.7 L/100 km; 17.6 km/L) to 50.4 mpg_{‑imp} (5.6 L/100 km; 17.8 km/L) depending on the specifications, with CO_{2} emissions between 127 and 129 g/km. It is the only Up to be available with a six-speed manual gearbox. The Up GTI went on sale in January 2018.

In April 2019, ordering for the Up GTI was halted in the United Kingdom, but in January 2020 VW UK started taking orders again for a lightly refreshed version. The refresh included small optional equipment changes, but no alterations to the powertrain, chassis or brakes. As of January 2023, new orders for the Up GTI were closed to allow time to complete orders before the GTI model ceased production.

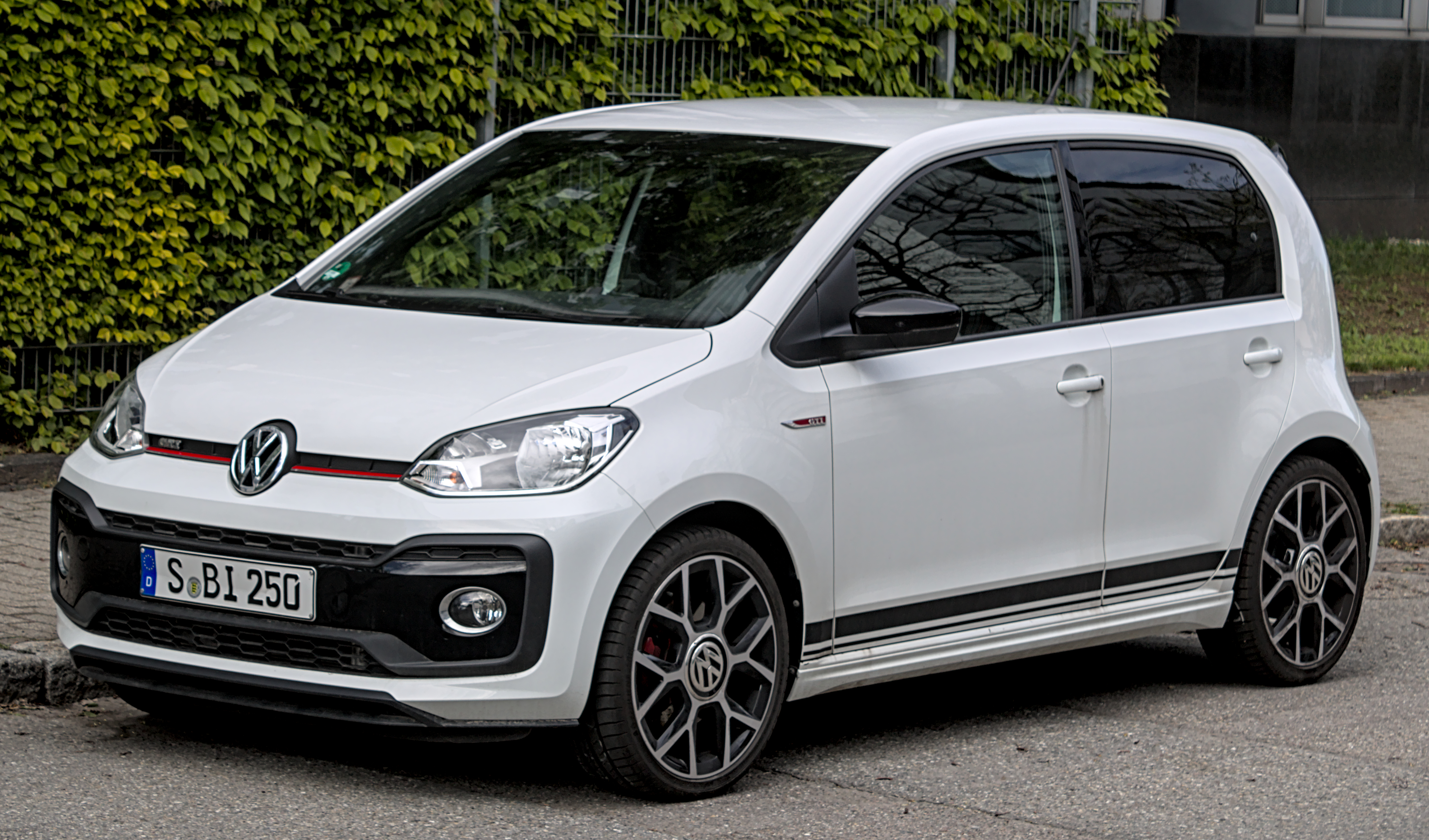
Up GTI

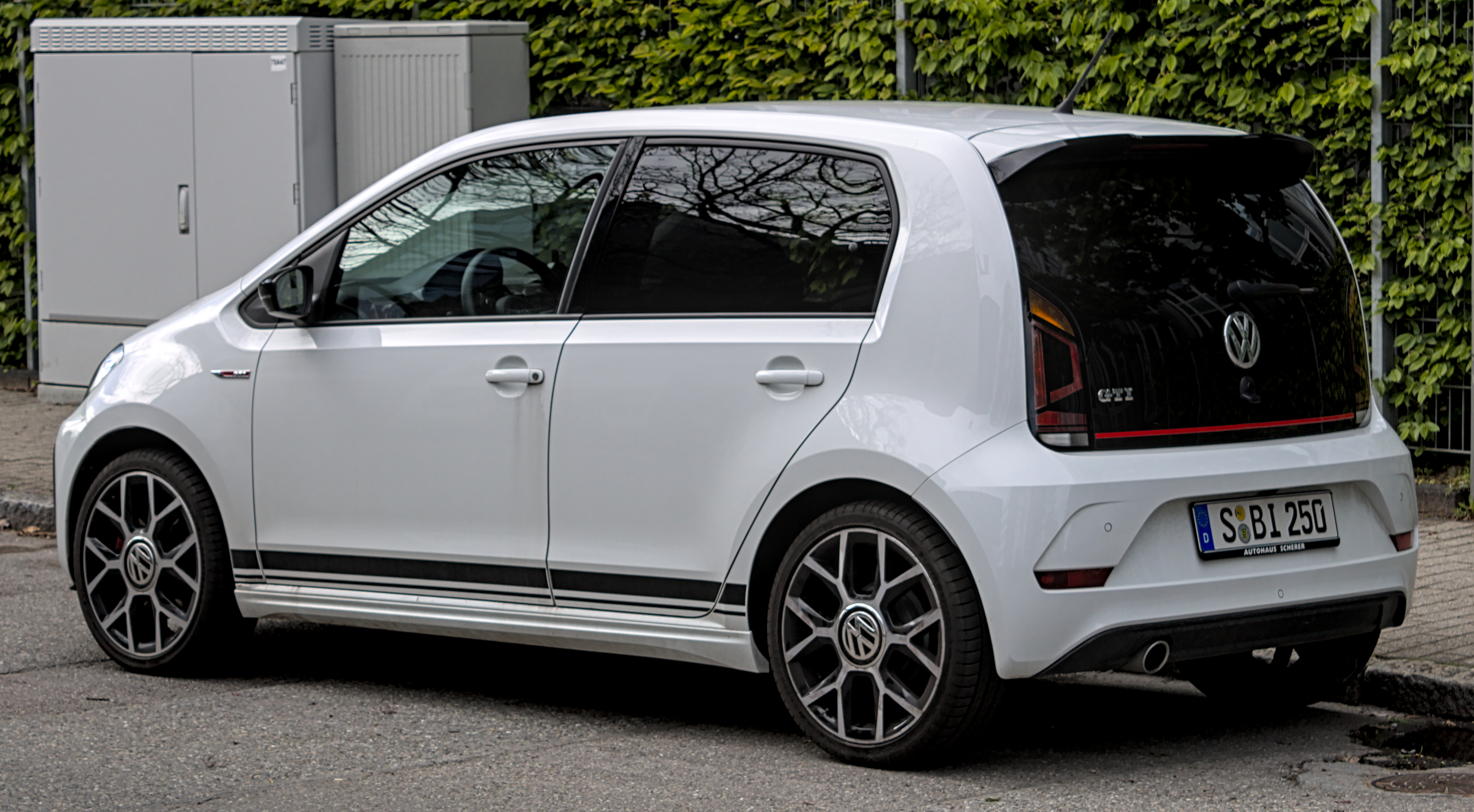
Rear view

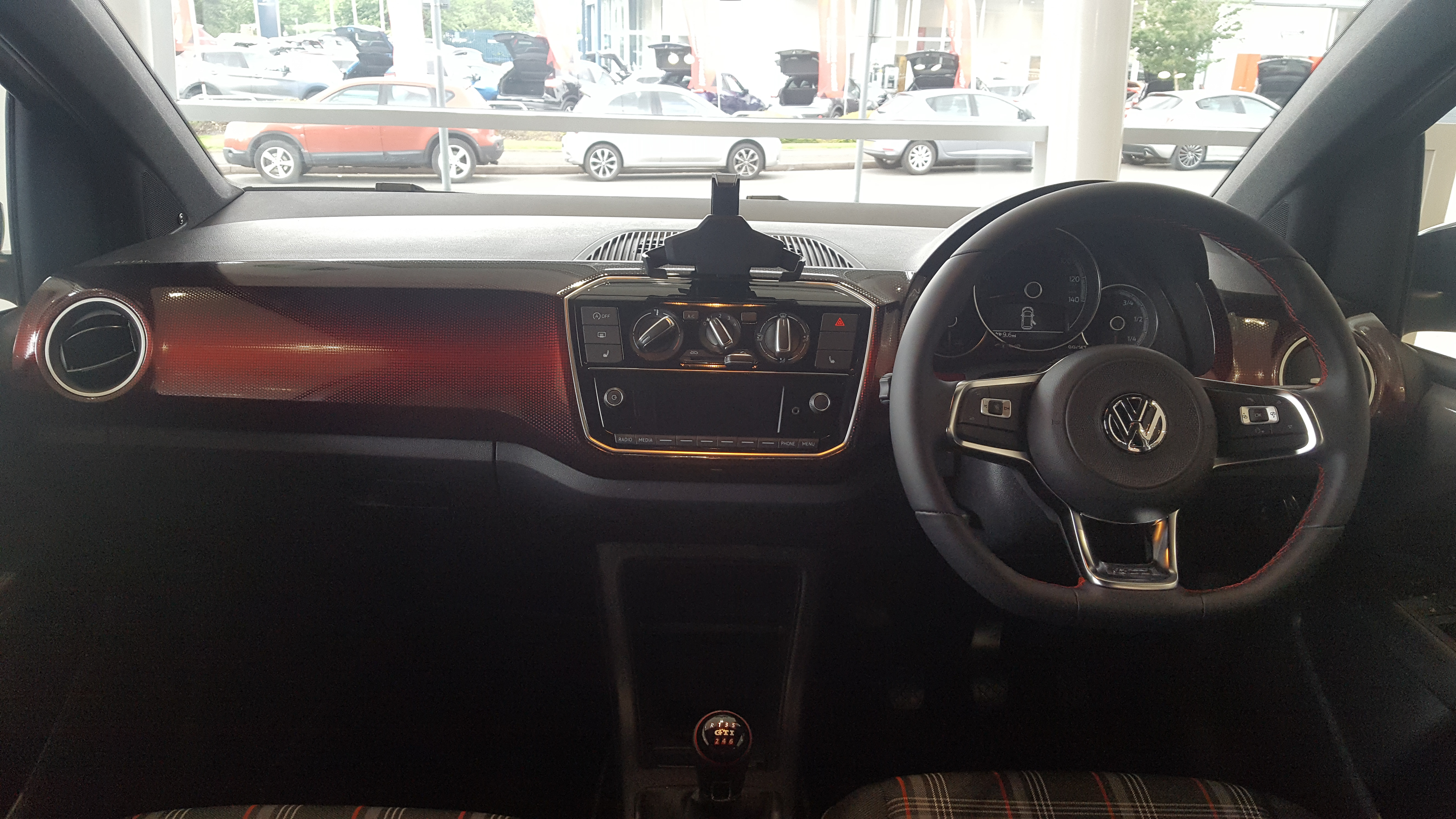
Interior

== E-up ==
=== First iteration ===
In July 2010 VW announced the production version of the E-up electric car, with sales scheduled to begin in 2013, and was subsequently unveiled at the September 2013 International Motor Show Germany.

The production version has an 18.7 kWh lithium-ion battery able to deliver 160 km (99 miles) on the NEDC cycle, can accelerate from 0-62 mph (100 km/h) in 12.4 seconds and has a top speed of 130 km/h (81 mph). The E-up can be charged with 2.3 kW plugged into any standard 230 V socket, with 3.6 kW via a home-installed wall box or with up to 40 kW plugged into a DC fast-charging station via the optional Combined Charging System (CCS), which allows the battery to charge up to 80% in under 30 minutes. The production version has the same dimensions as the five-door petrol model with seating for four.

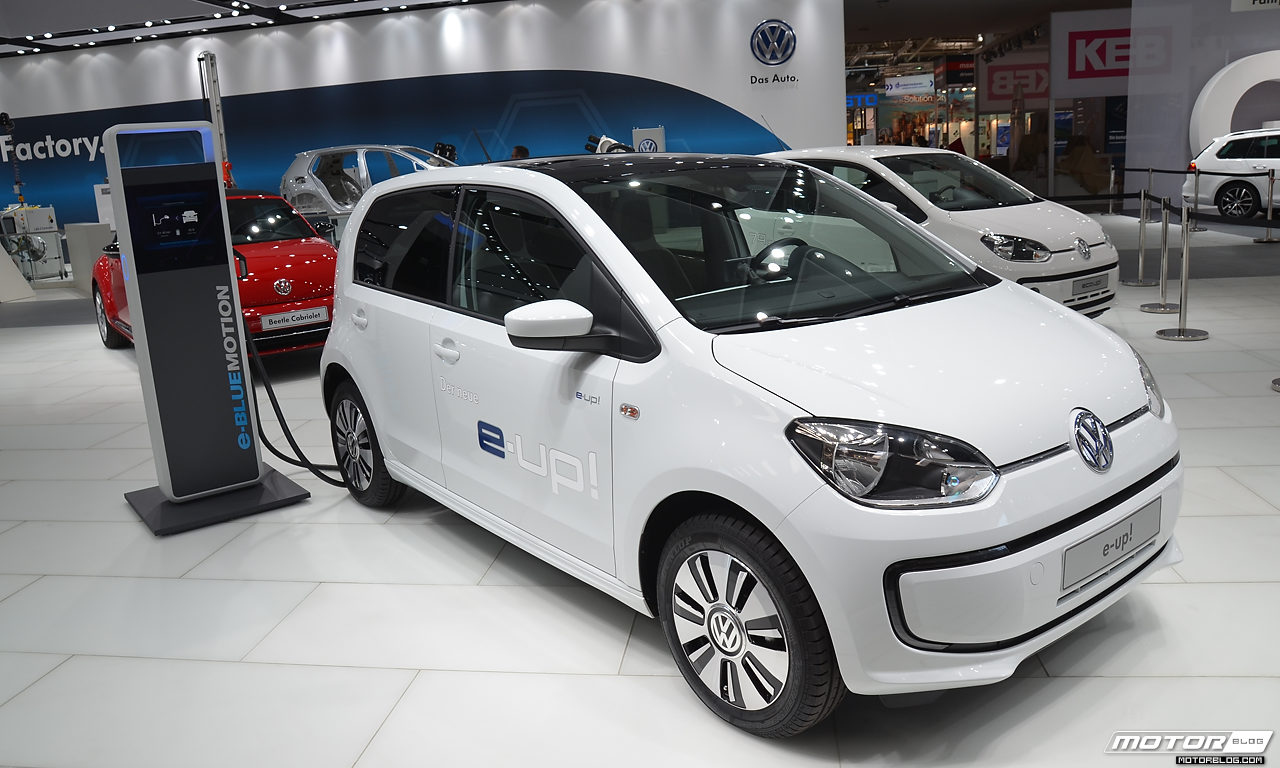
2012 e-Up

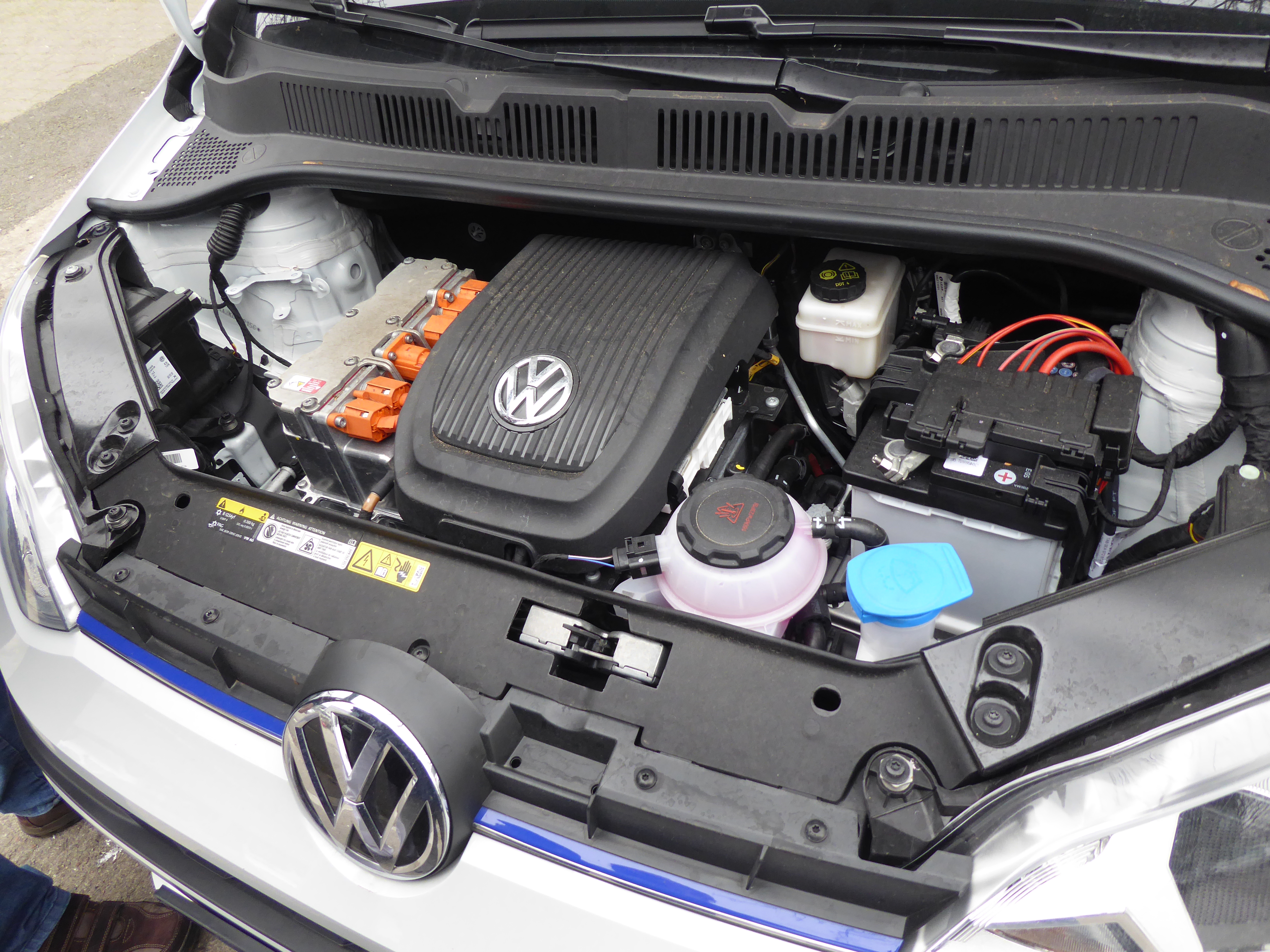
Powertrain bay

=== Second iteration ===
A second iteration of the e-up was announced on 5 September 2019. It is equipped with a larger 32.3 kWh battery, a range of 260 km (160 mi) and efficiency of 12.7 kWh/100 km (4.89 mi/kWh). 32.3 kWh is the usable (net) capacity, while the total (gross) capacity is 36.8 kWh.

The Škoda version was released as the Škoda Citigo-e iV, with a 36.8 kWh battery capacity and a range of 270 km (165 miles) under WLTP standard, and was mass-produced from autumn 2019. It is the first all-electric car of Škoda Auto and replaced the combustion engine version. Similarly, the petrol-powered Seat Mii was replaced with an electric version, the Mii Electric.

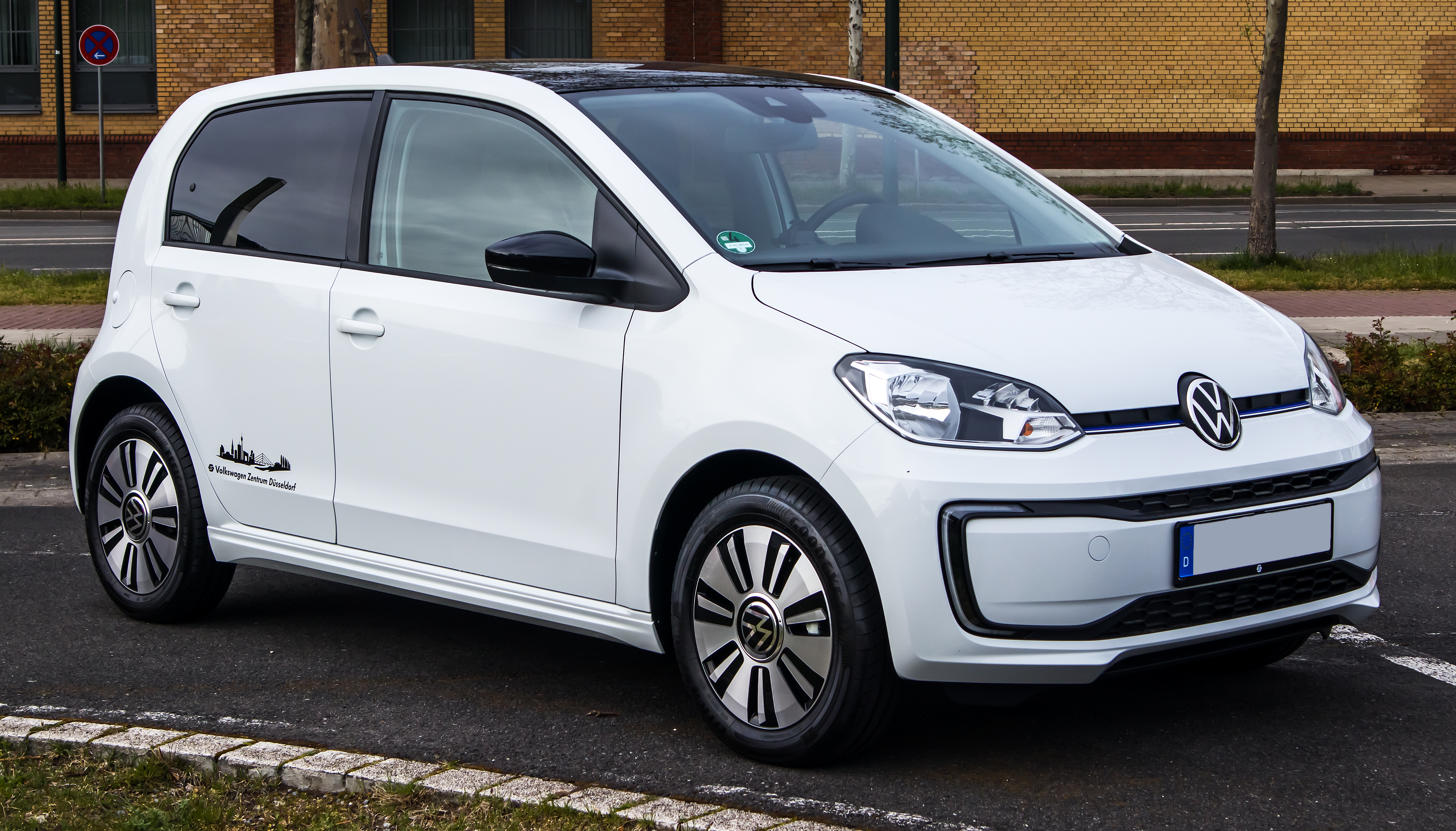
2021 e-Up

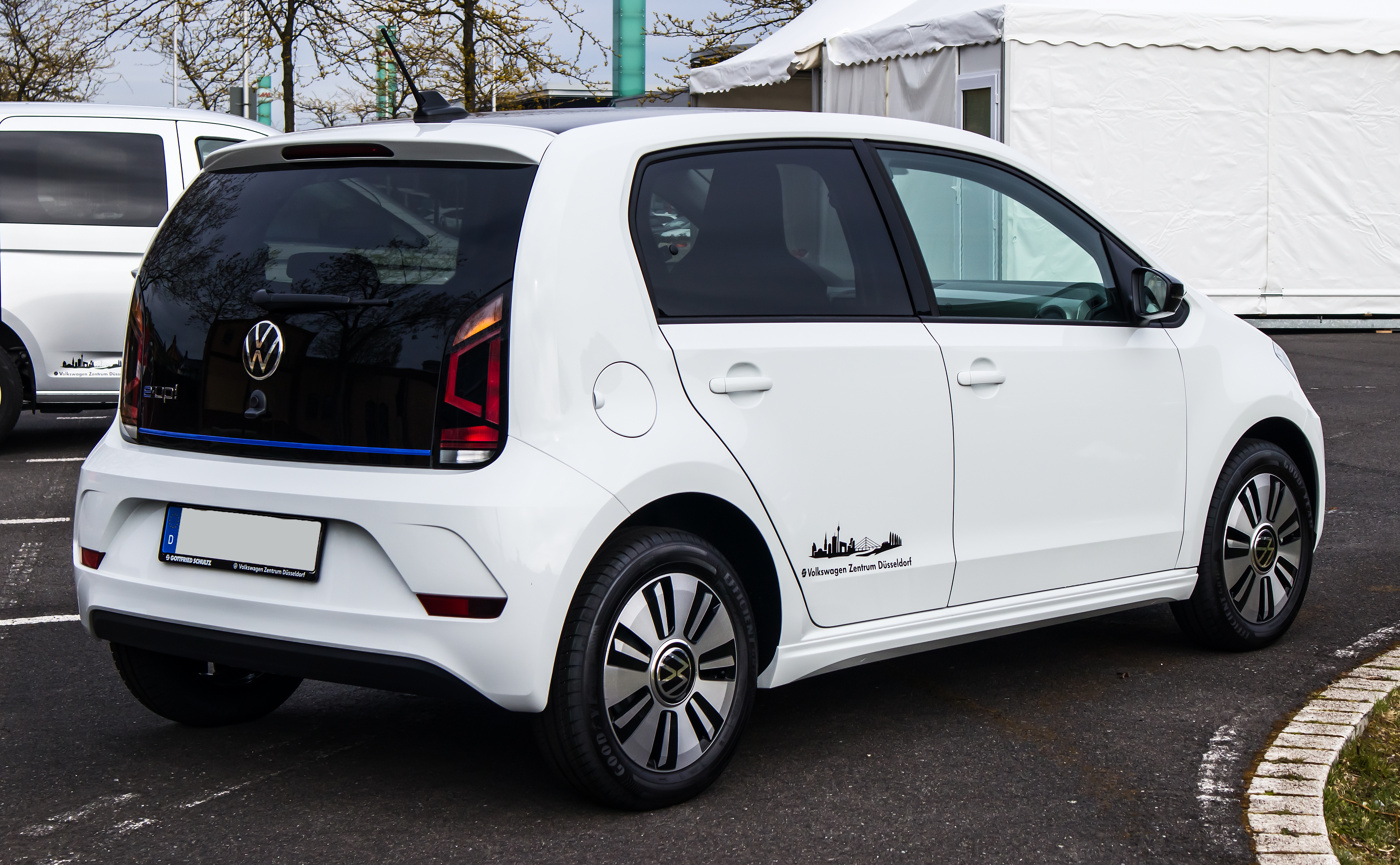
Rear view

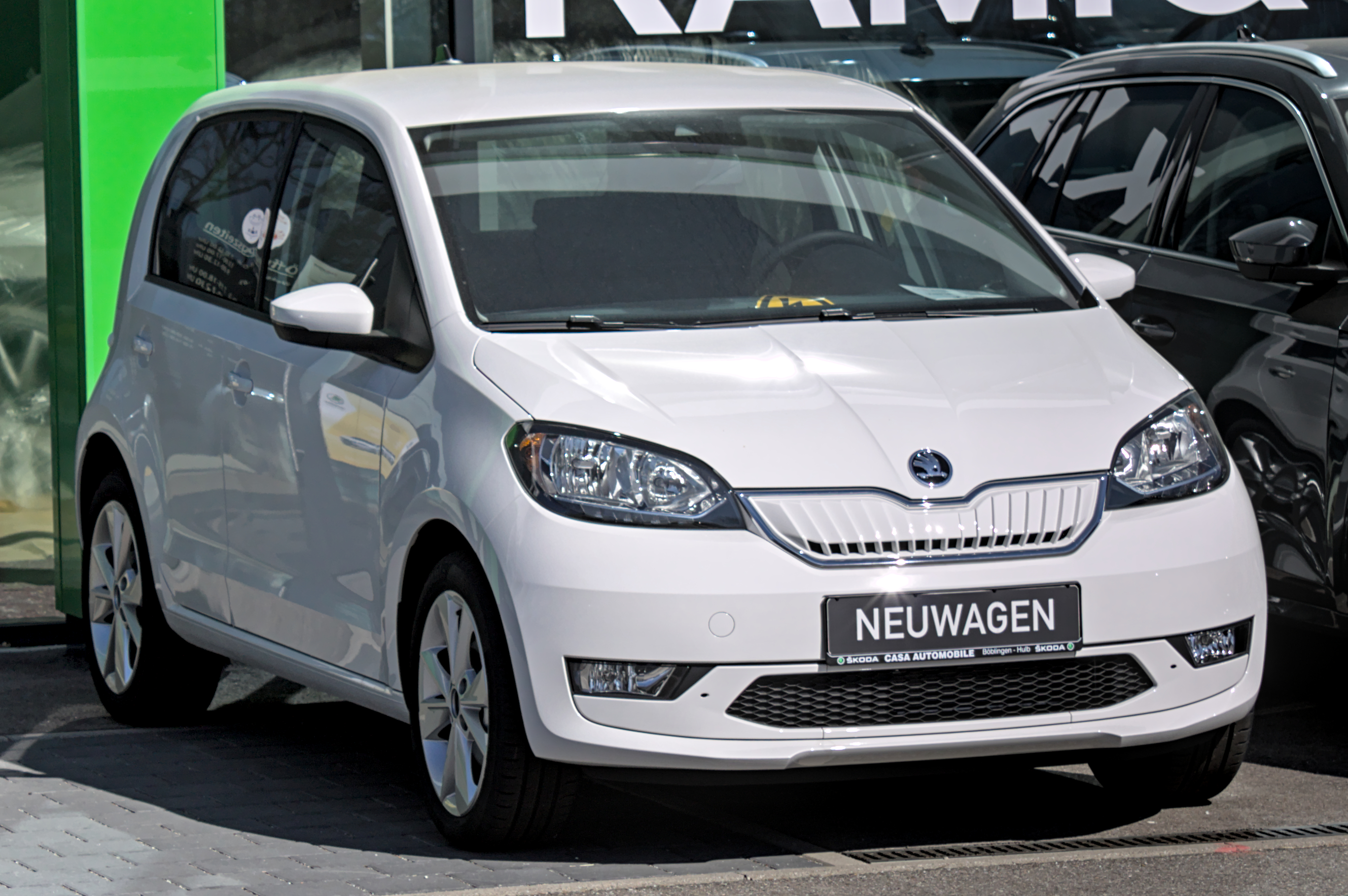
Škoda Citigo-e iV

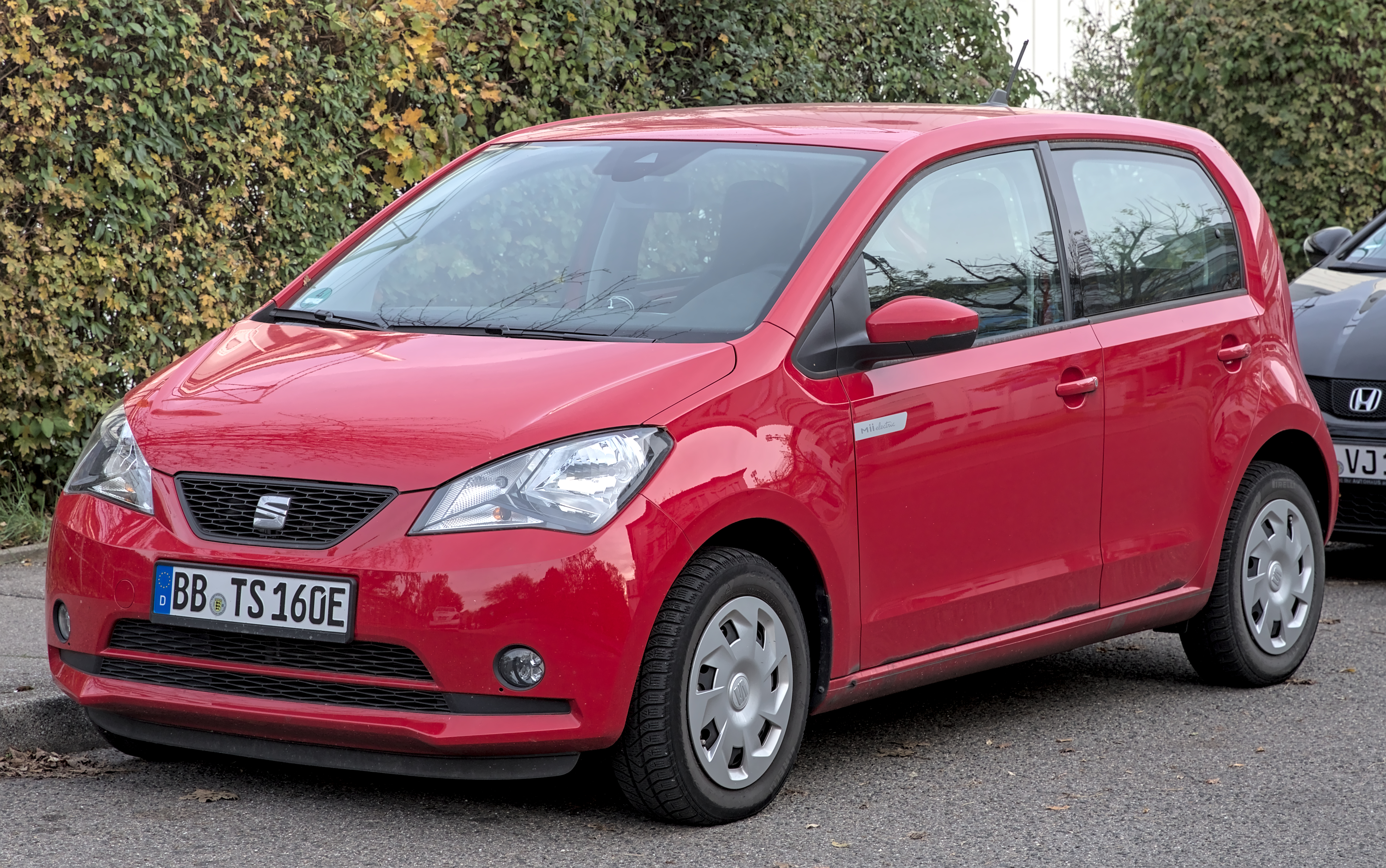
SEAT Mii Electric

=== Sales and market ===
E-up annual EU and EFTA sales statistics
Year	Sales (% change from prior year)
2013	940
2014	5,838(+621%)
2015	2,976(-49%)
2016	2,576(-13%)
2017	3,054(+19%)

Retail deliveries began in Germany in October 2013, followed shortly after by Denmark, Sweden, France, Norway, and the Netherlands, and the UK at the end of January 2014. The E-up! is not sold in the U.S. or Canada.

As of January 2020, Volkswagen have sold 21,000 E-up! Worldwide.

=== Technical data ===
Technical data
	e-up! (2013)	e-up! (2019)
Introduced	2013	2019
Transmission	Single-speed fixed gear ratio (electric)	
Power	60 kW (80 hp)	
Torque	210 N⋅m (150 lbf⋅ft)	
Battery	18,7kWh (16.8 net)	36,8kWh (32.3 net)
Range	160 km (99 mi)	258 km (160 mi)
Average Energy consumption	11.7 kWh/100 km (NEDC)	14.9 kWh/100 km
Drag coefficient Cd	0.281	0.308
charge time AC	9 h (3,3 kW)	5,5 h (7,1 kW)
charge time DC	0.5 h (40 kW)	0.75 h (40 kW)
0–100 km/h (62 mph)	12.4 sec	
Curb weight All fluids, 50% fuel	1,139 kg (2,511 lb)	1,229 kg (2,709 lb)
Top speed	130 km/h	
Dimensions (length/width/height in mm):	3540/1645/1477mm	3600/1645/1492mm
Base price	€26,900	€21,975

== Powertrain ==
Both engines are also available with BlueMotion technologies (SEAT: Ecomotive, Škoda: Green Tech), which incorporates a start-stop system and regenerative brakes to reduce carbon emissions. Depending on markets, some 60PS and 75PS models are available with optional five-speed automatic transmission.

Version	1.0 (60 PS)	1.0 (75 PS)	1.0 (90 PS)	1.0 (101 PS)	1.0 (115 PS)
Type and number of cylinders	Straight-three engine with multi-point fuel-injection		Straight-three turbocharged engine with direct fuel-injection		Straight-three high-pressure turbo engine with direct fuel-injection
Valves	12				
Displacement	999 cc (1 L; 61 cu in)				
Power	44 kW (60 PS; 59 hp) @ 5,000 rpm	55 kW (75 PS; 74 hp) @ 6,200 rpm	66 kW (90 PS; 89 hp) @ 5,000–5,500 rpm	75 kW (102 PS; 101 hp) @ 5,000 rpm	85 kW (116 PS; 114 hp) @ 5,000 rpm
Torque	95 N⋅m (70 lbf⋅ft) @ 3,000–4,300 rpm		160 N⋅m (118 lbf⋅ft) @ 1,500–3,000 rpm	164.5 N⋅m (121 lbf⋅ft) @ 1,500 rpm	200 N⋅m (148 lbf⋅ft) @ 2000 rpm
Transmission, standard	5-speed manual				6-speed manual
Transmission, optional	5-speed automatically shifted manual gearbox (ASG gearbox)				None
Top speed	161 km/h (100 mph)	171 km/h (106 mph)	185 km/h (115 mph)	184 km/h (114 mph)	192 km/h (119 mph)
Acceleration, 0–100 km/h (0-62 mph)	14.4 seconds	13.2 seconds	9.9 seconds	9.1 seconds	8.8 seconds
Fuel consumption (combined, EU-norm)	4.5 L/100 km (63 mpg_{‑imp}; 52 mpg_{‑US})	4.7 L/100 km (60 mpg_{‑imp}; 50 mpg_{‑US})	4.4 L/100 km (64 mpg_{‑imp}; 53 mpg_{‑US})		
CO_{2} emission, combined (g/km)	105 (BlueMotion 96)	108 (BlueMotion 98)	101		
European emission standards	Euro 5		Euro 6		

== Safety ==
=== ANCAP ===
ANCAP test results* Volkswagen up! (2012)
Test	Score
Overall	5 /5 stars
Frontal offset	14.20/16
Side impact	1.17/16
Pole	2/2
Seat belt reminders	3/3
Whiplash protection	Good
Pedestrian protection	Marginal
Electronic stability control	Standard

=== Latin NCAP ===
In 2014, the Latin-American Volkswagen Up was evaluated under the Latin NCAP 1.0 assessment and achieved a 5-star security rating for adults and 4-star security rating for children:

Latin NCAP 1.5 test results Volkswagen up! + 2 Airbags (2014, similar to Euro NCAP 2002)
Test	Points	Stars
Adult occupant:	15.86/17.0	5 /5 stars
Child occupant:	39.54/49.00	4 /5 stars

=== Euro NCAP ===
==== 2011 ====
In 2011, the SEAT Mii was evaluated for its safety performance under the Euro NCAP assessment scheme and it achieved a 5-star overall rating:

Euro NCAP test results* Volkswagen up! (2011)
Test	Points	%
Overall:	5 /5 stars	
Adult occupant:	32	89%
Child occupant:	39	80%
Pedestrian:	17	46%
Safety assist:	6	86%

==== 2019 ====
The Up in its standard European market configuration received 3 stars from Euro NCAP in 2019, with the Mii and Citigo shared its results.

Euro NCAP test results* Volkswagen e-up! 'Move Up' (LHD) (2019)
Test	Points	%
Overall:	3 /5 stars	
Adult occupant:	30.8	81%
Child occupant:	41	83%
Pedestrian:	22.5	46%
Safety assist:	7.2	55%

== Environmental performance ==
In February 2019 Green NCAP assessed Volkswagen Up GTI with 1.0-litre TSI engine and 6-speed manual gearbox:

Green NCAP test results VW Up (2019) GTI 4x2 manual
Test	Points
Overall:	4 /5 stars
Clean Air Index: 9.2/10: adequate / Laboratory Tests / HC / CO / NOx / PN; 8.3/9 / Cold test / good / good / good / adequate; 3.0/3 / Warm test / good / good / good / good; 3.0/3 / Eco Mode / good / good / good / good; 3.0/3 / Sport Mode / good / good / good / good; 7.0/9 / Highway / good / weak / good / marginal; good / Road Test / HC / CO / NOx / PN; 7.0/7 / On-Road Drive / n.a. / good / good / good; adequate / Robustness
Energy Efficiency Index: 6.7/10: adequate / Laboratory Tests / Energy Efficiency; 8.8/10 / Cold test / adequate; 2.7/3 / Warm test / adequate; 2.7/3 / Eco Mode / adequate; 2.7/3 / Sport Mode / adequate; 5.7/10 / Highway / marginal

== Škoda Citigo ==
The Škoda Citigo is a rebadged version of the Up, with slightly different front and rear fascias. The Citigo was launched in the Czech Republic in October 2011. It began sales in other European countries from summer 2012. It was manufactured at the Volkswagen Plant in Bratislava, Slovakia. Plans for sales in Russia and most other CIS countries were cancelled due to its dimensions being deemed too small for the market. The Škoda Citigo was also sold in Israel and New Zealand for a short time. The Citigo was slightly updated with a facelift model in 2017. A fully electric version, the Škoda Citigo-e iV, with a 36.8 kWh battery capacity and a range of 270 km (168 mi) under WLTP standard, was mass-produced from autumn 2019 and replaced the combustion engine version. It was the first all-electric car of Škoda Auto. In autumn 2020, Škoda terminated the sale of Citigo electric cars.

Designation	Displacement, valvetrain / capacity	Motive power at max. rpm	Max. torque at rpm	Gearbox (type), drive	Top speed	0–100 km/h (0–62 mph)	Combined consumption (per 100 km)
1.0 MPI	999 cm^{3}, 12V	44 kW (60 PS) at 5000 rpm	95 N⋅m (70 lbf⋅ft) at 3000–4300 rpm	5 speed-man/aut	161 km/h (100 mph)	14.4 s	4.4 L
1.0 MPI	999 cm^{3}, 12V	55 kW (75 PS) at 6200 rpm	95 N⋅m (70 lbf⋅ft) at 3000–4300 rpm	5 speed-man/aut	172 km/h (107 mph)	13.2 s	4.5 L
1.0 CNG	999 cm^{3}, 12V	50 kW (68 PS) at 6200 rpm	90 N⋅m (66 lbf⋅ft) at 3000 rpm	5-speed manual	164 km/h (102 mph)	16.3 s	4.4 m^{3} (2.9 kg)
Electric	36.8 kWh	60 kW (82 PS)	210 N⋅m (155 lbf⋅ft)	1-speed	130 km/h (81 mph)	12.3 s	12.8 kWh

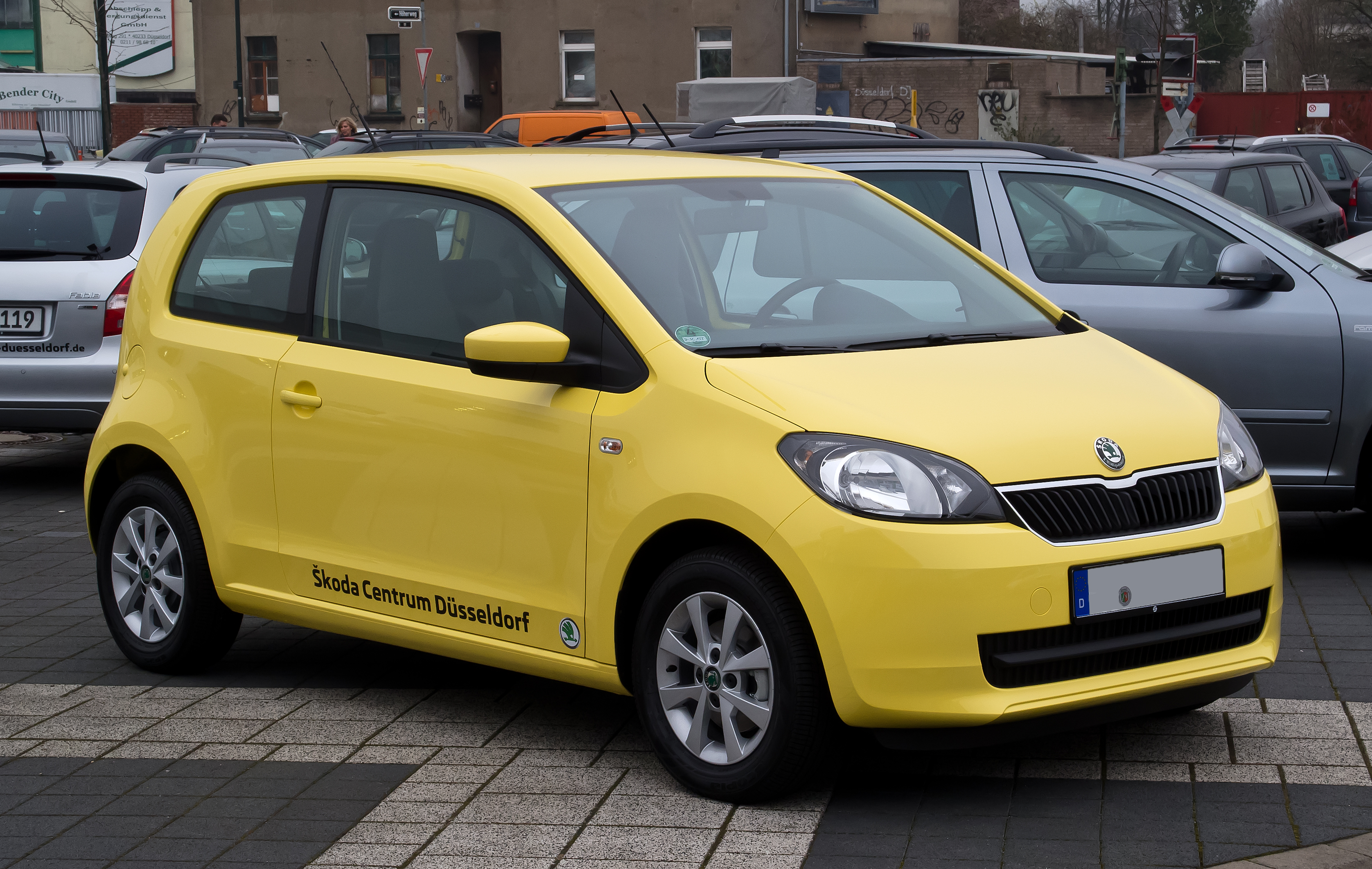
Škoda Citigo (3-door)

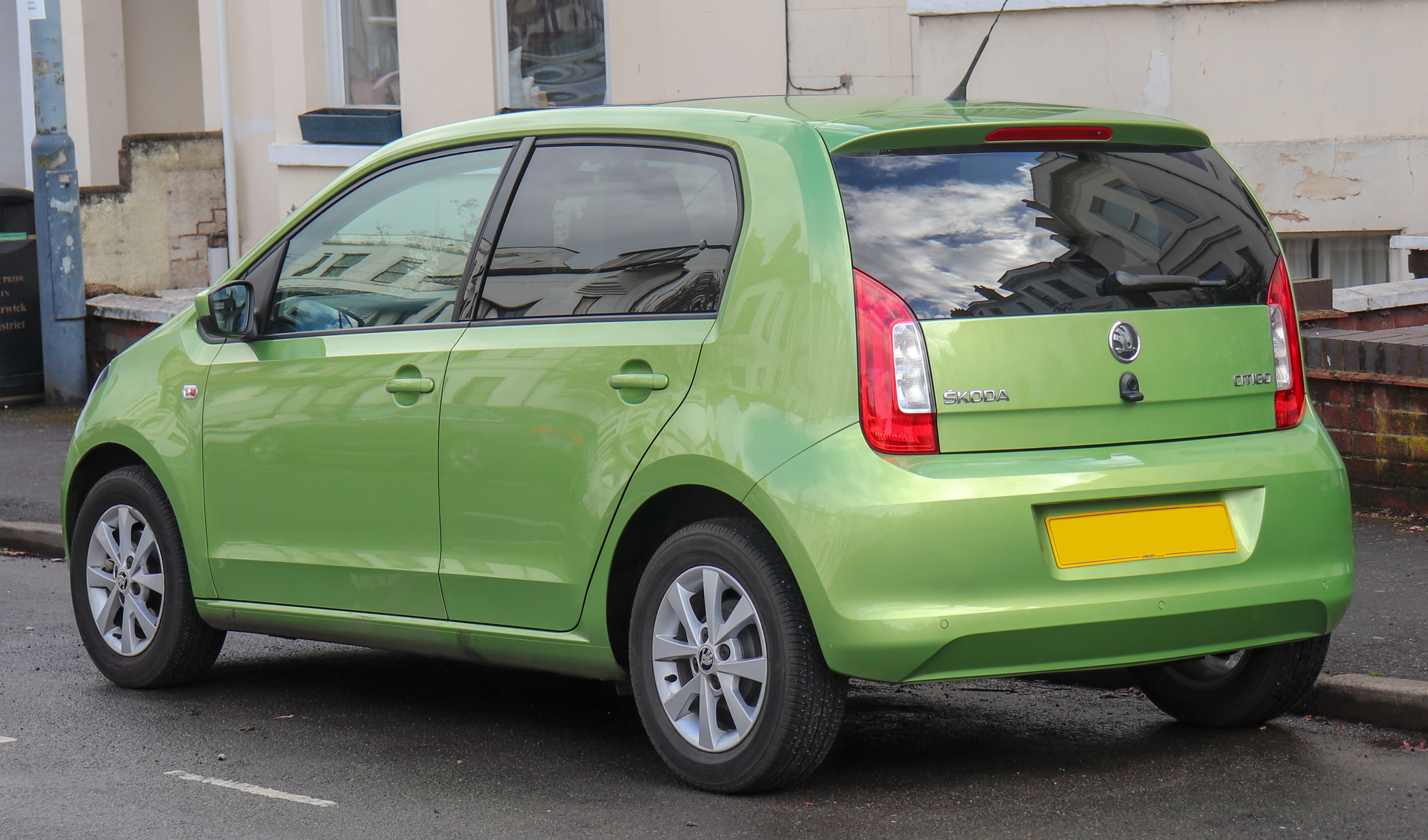
Škoda Citigo (5-door)

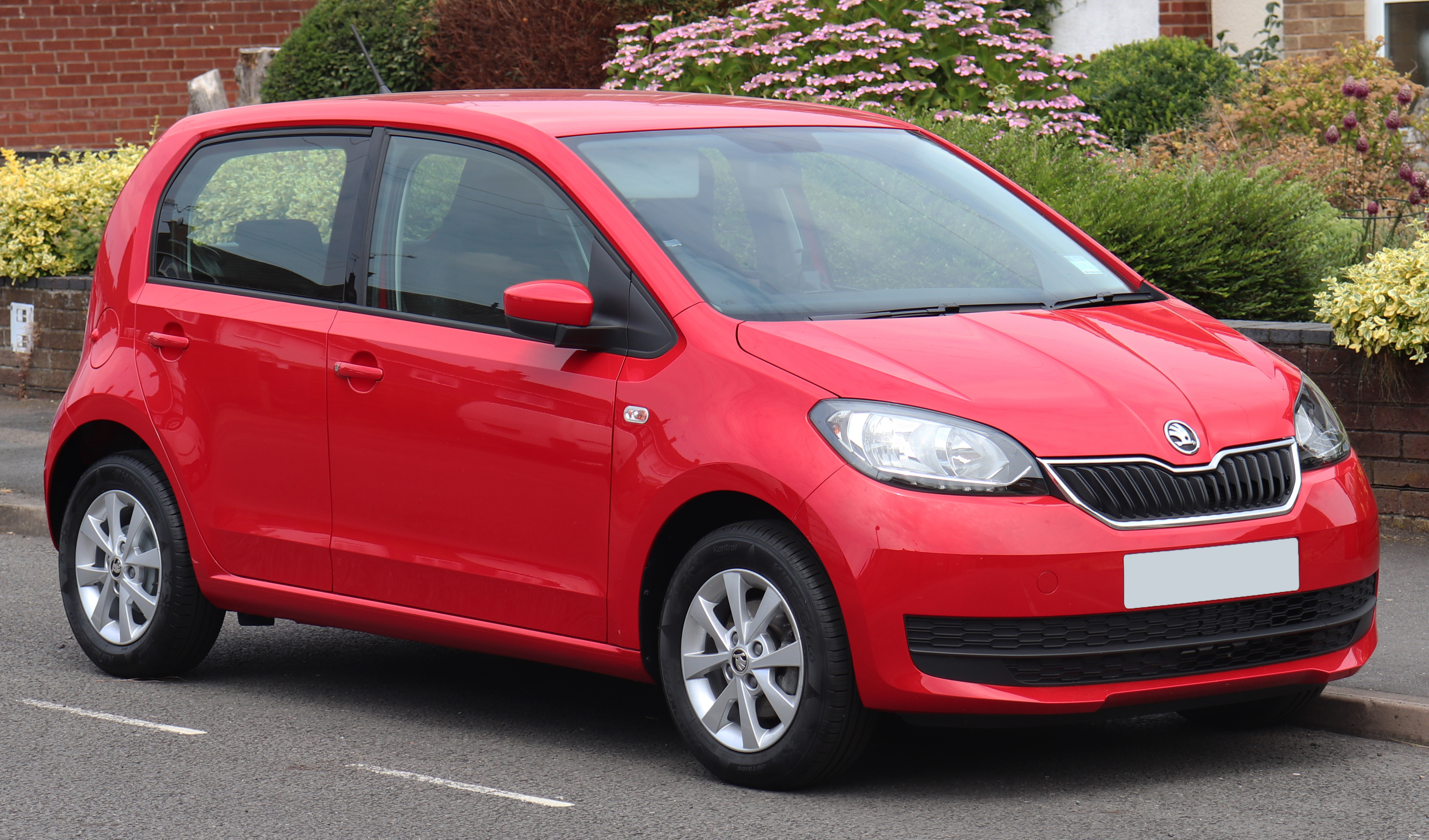
Facelift Škoda Citigo (5-door)

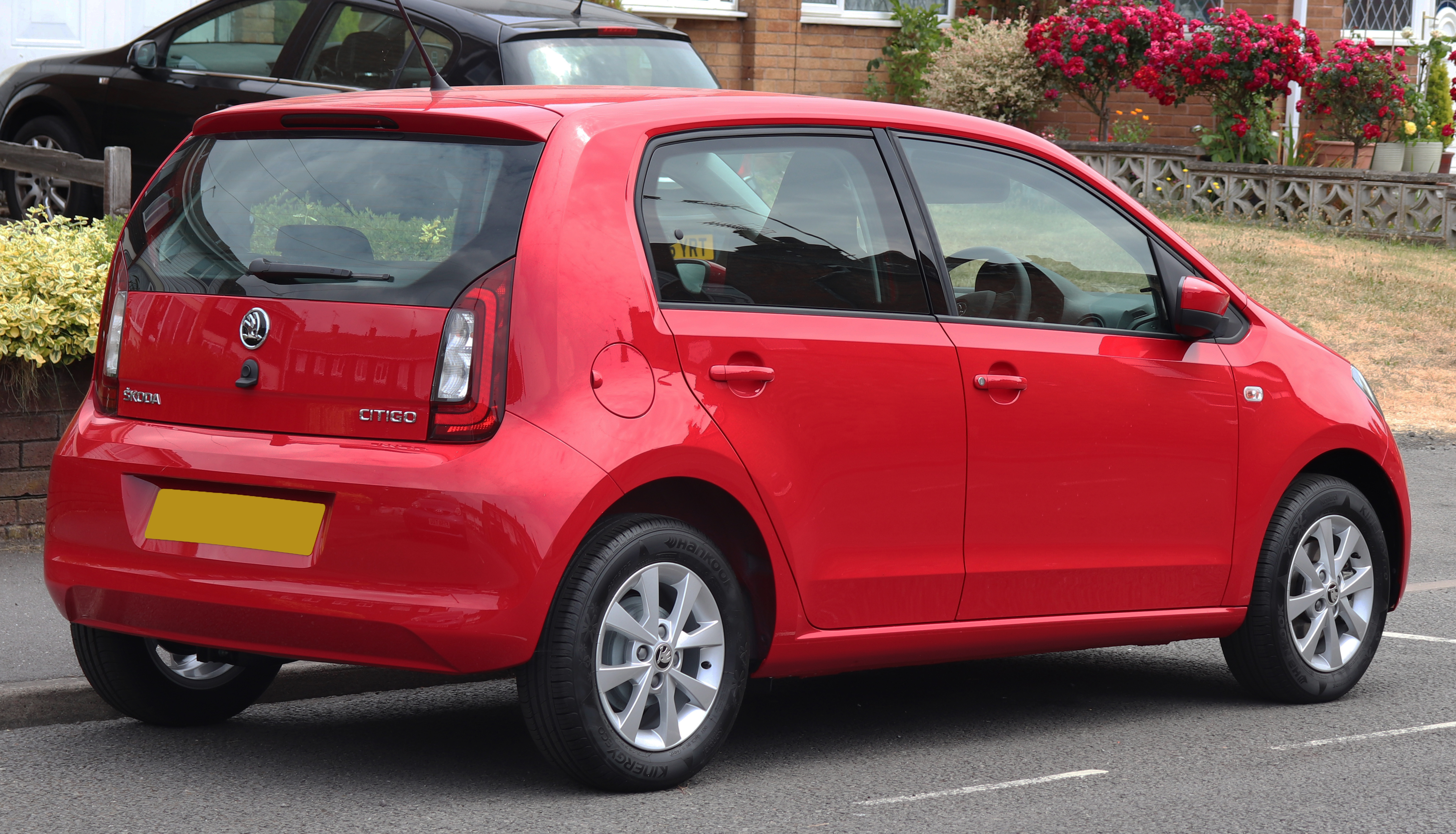
Facelift Škoda Citigo (5-door)

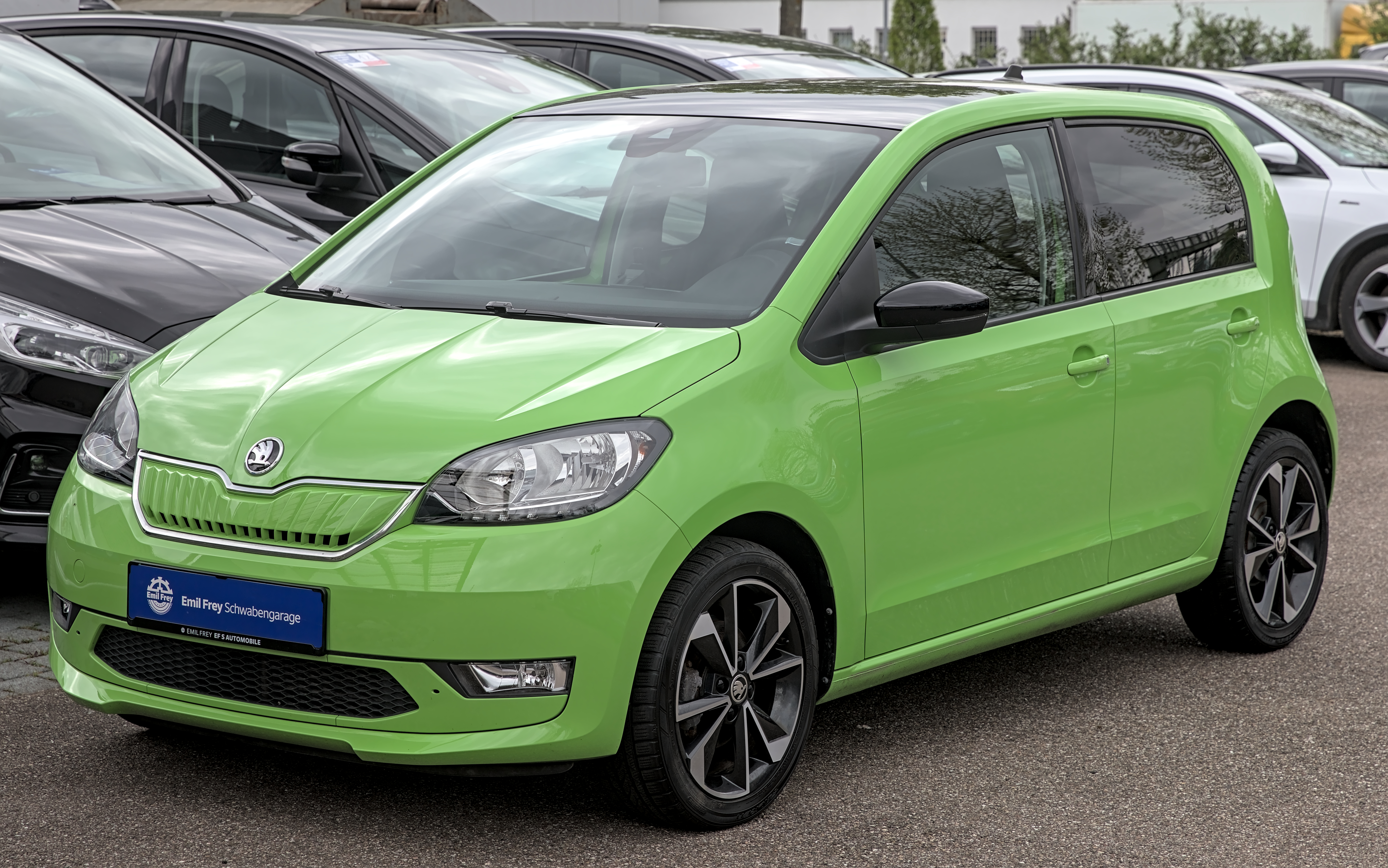
Škoda Citigo-e iV

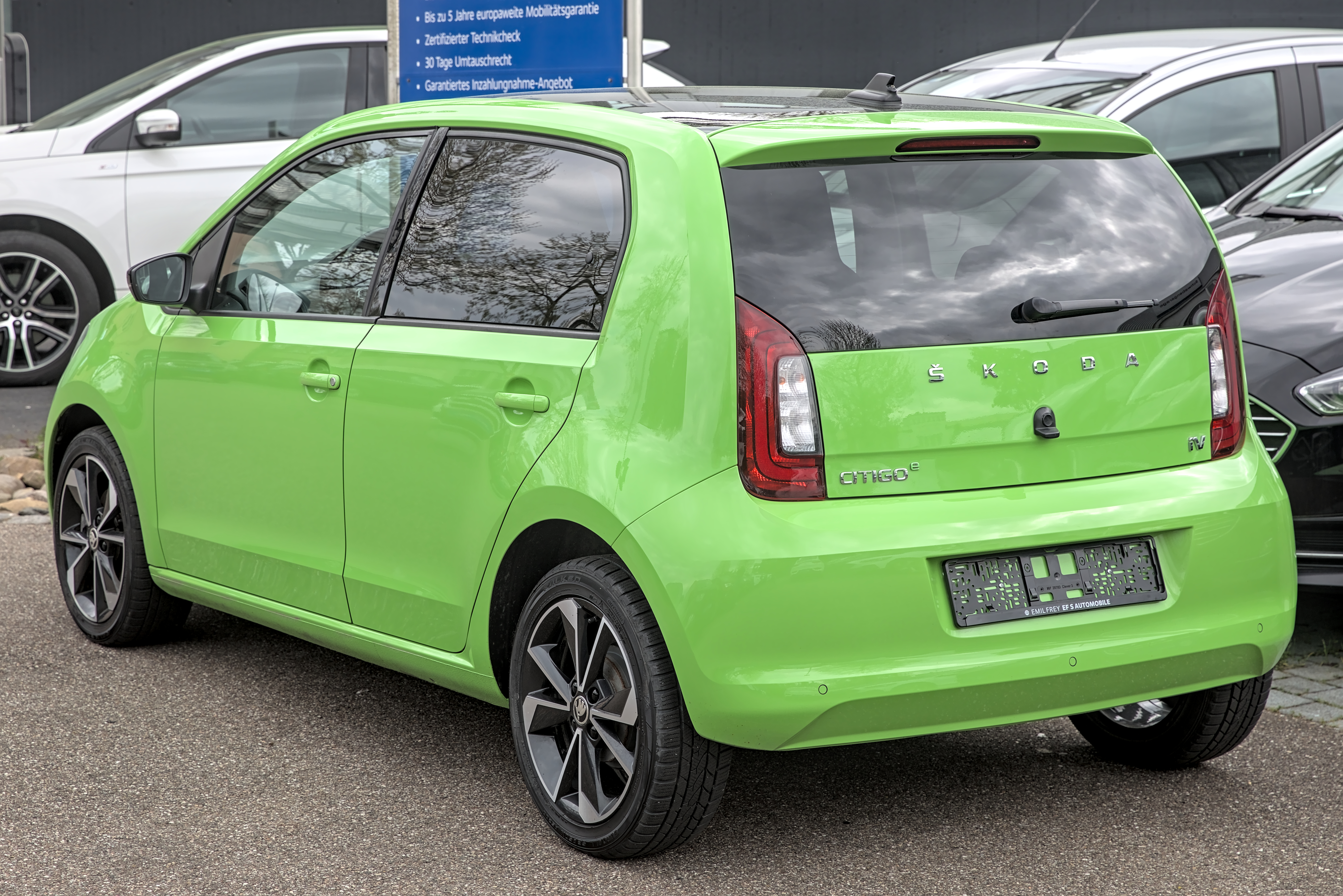
Škoda Citigo-e iV

== SEAT Mii ==
The SEAT Mii, like the Citigo, is a rebadged version of the Up, with noticeable differences to the front and rear fascias. The Mii was launched in the Spanish home market simultaneously with the Up and Citigo in October 2011. It began sales in other European countries from the second quarter of 2012. It was manufactured at the Volkswagen Plant in Bratislava, Slovakia. Primarily sold in Europe, it received no noticeable facelifts, unlike the Citigo. A fully electric version, the SEAT Mii electric, with a 36.8kWh lithium-ion battery and a range of 205 km (127 mi), was mass produced from 2019 to 2020. In 2020, SEAT decided to discontinue the electric models, following the 2021 discontinuation of the entire Mii lineup.

In 2016 SEAT produced a collaborative edition with Cosmopolitan magazine.

Designation	Displacement, valvetrain / capacity	Motive power at max. rpm	Max. torque at rpm	Gearbox (type), drive	Top speed	0–100 km/h (0–62 mph)
1.0 MPI	999 cm^{3}, 12V	44 kW (60 PS) at 5000-6000 rpm	95 N⋅m (70 lbf⋅ft) at 3000–4300 rpm	5 speed man/aut	161 km/h (100 mph)	14.4 s
1.0 MPI	999 cm^{3}, 12V	55 kW (75 PS) at 6200 rpm	95 N⋅m (70 lbf⋅ft) at 3000–4300 rpm	5 speed man/aut	172 km/h (107 mph)	13.2 s
1.0 CNG	999 cm^{3}, 12V	50 kW (68 PS) at 6200 rpm	90 N⋅m (66 lbf⋅ft) at 3000 rpm	5 speed manual	164 km/h (102 mph)	16.3 s
Electric	36.8kWh	60 kW (82 PS)	210 N⋅m (155 lbf⋅ft)	1 speed	130 km/h (81 mph)	15.8 s

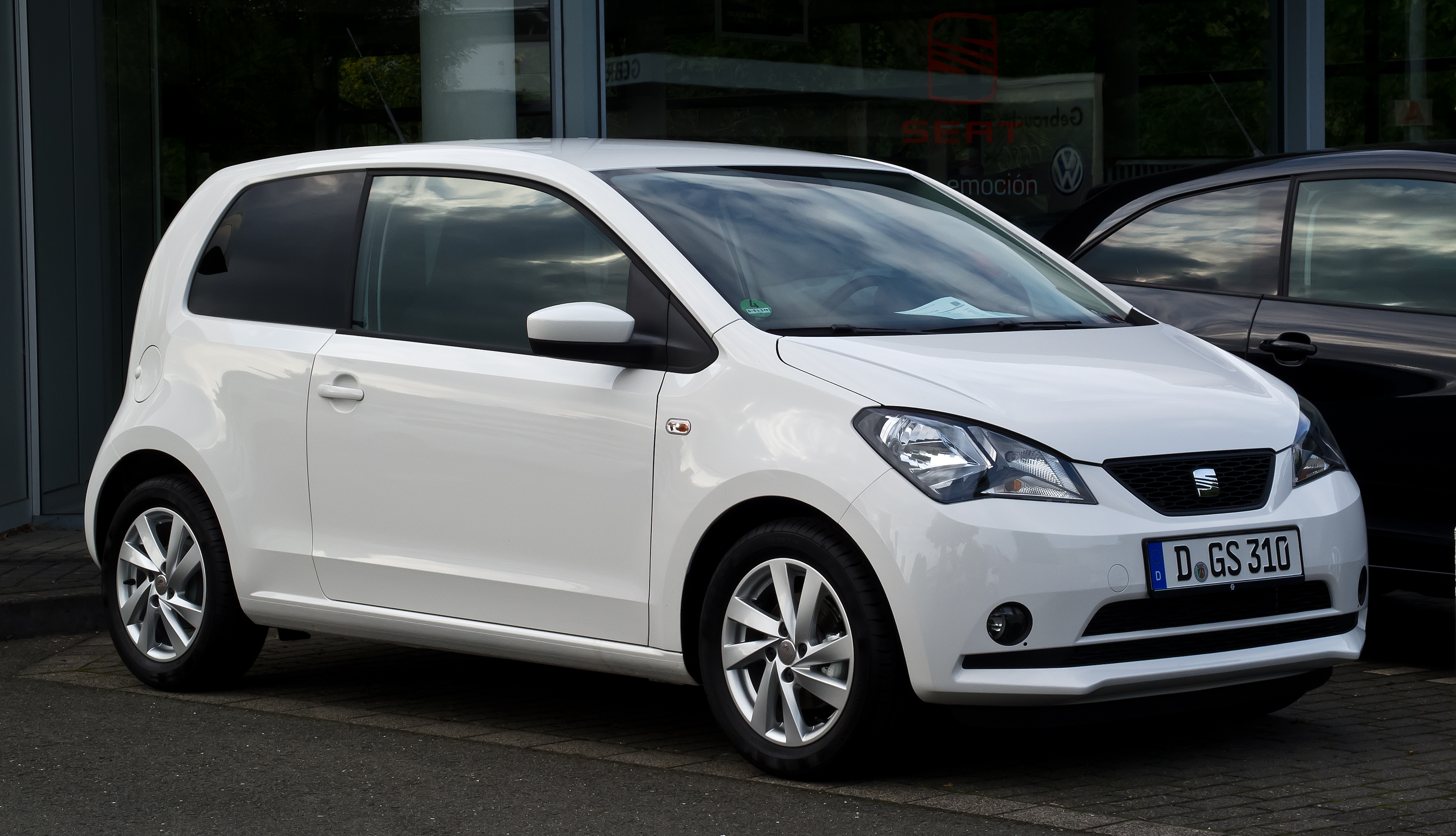
SEAT Mii (3-door)

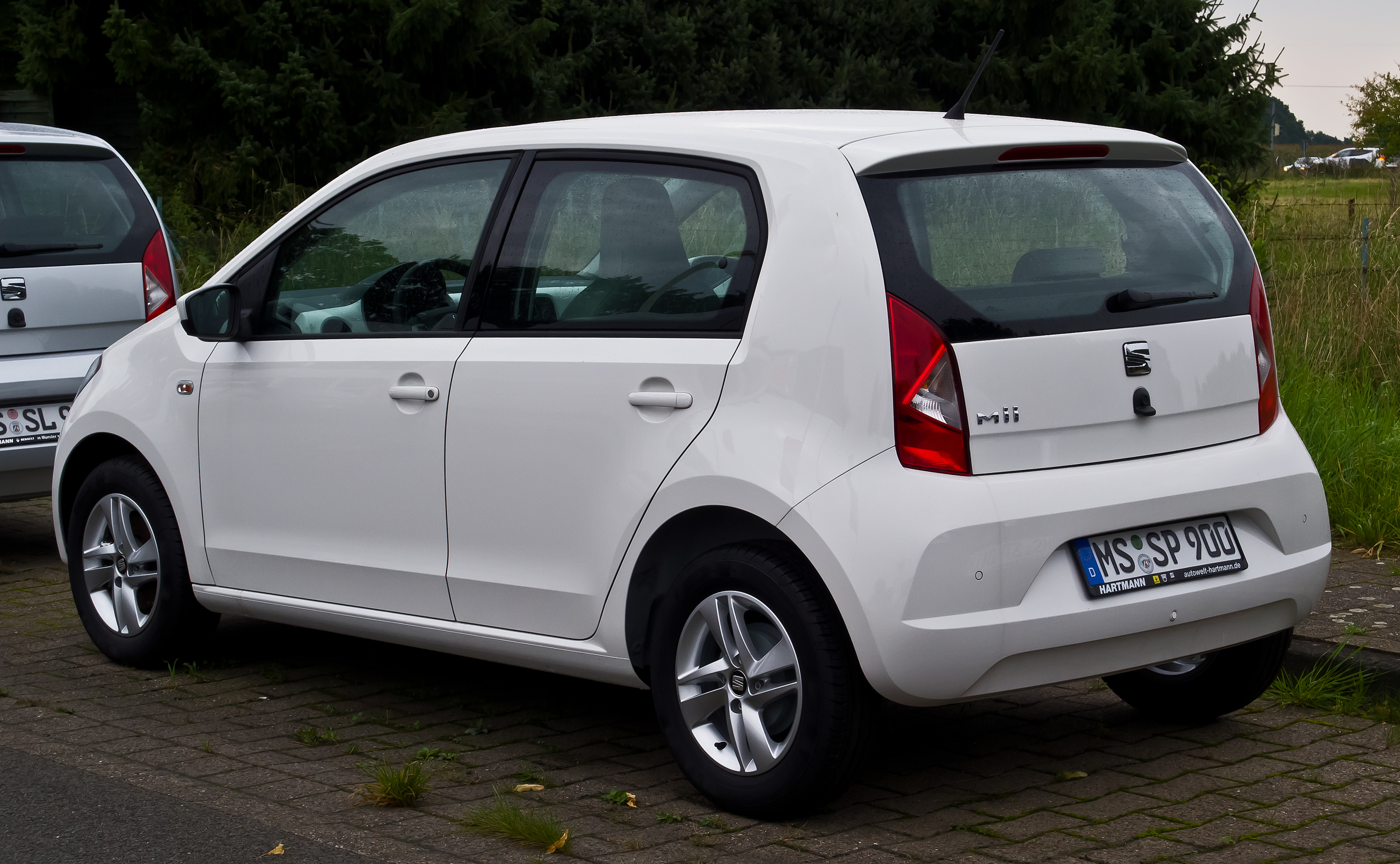
SEAT Mii (5-door)

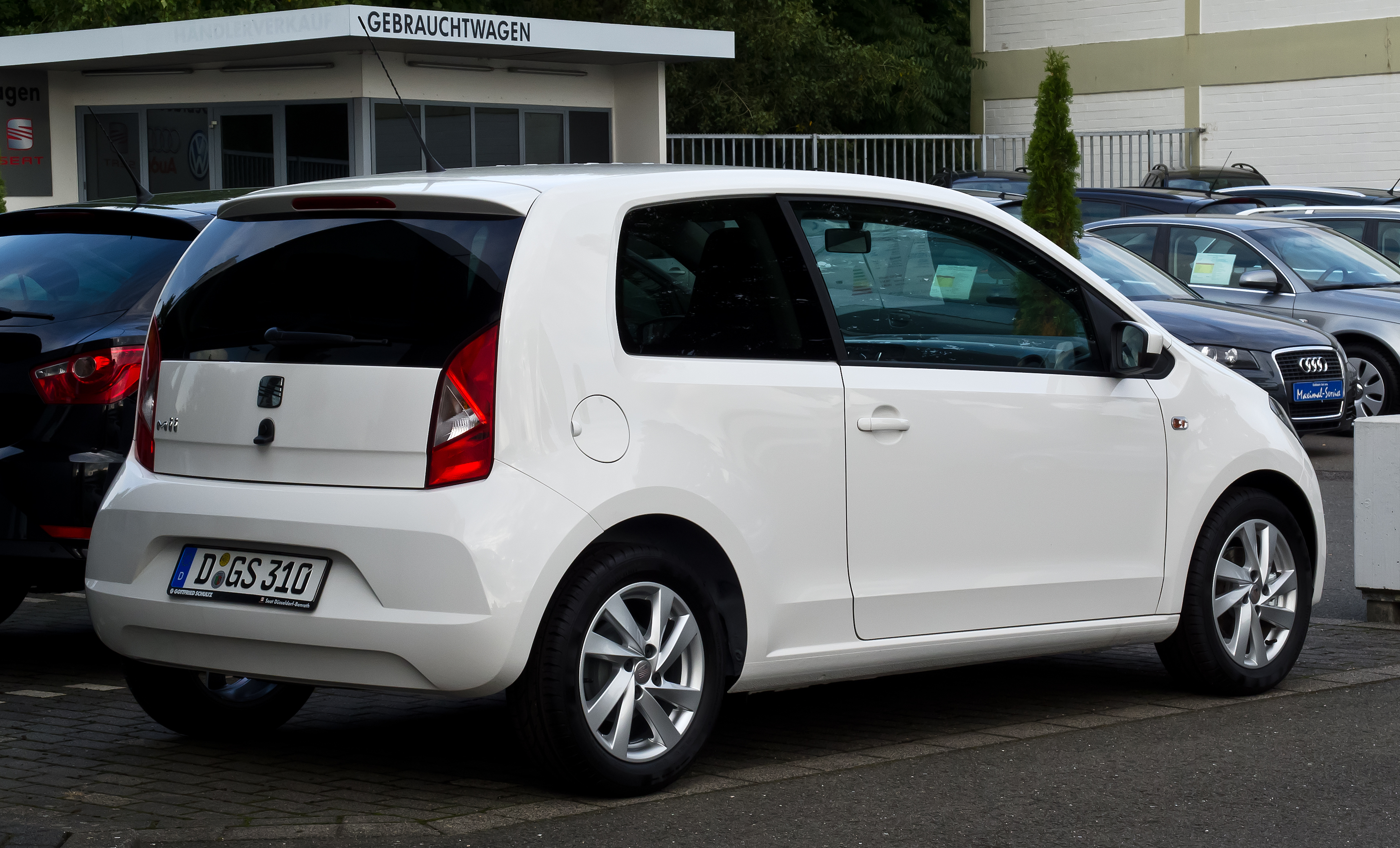
SEAT Mii (3-door)

== Concept models ==
From 2007 through to 2010 Volkswagen showed a number of concept versions of the Up prior to the launch of the production-ready version in 2011.

=== 2007 Up concept ===
The two-door Up concept debuted at the 2007 IAA International Motor Show Germany in Germany, with a rear-wheel drive, rear-mounted, boxer engine and 18 inch wheels.

The interior is designed to accommodate four adults, and features flat-folding, air inflatable seats. It also has two monitors on the dashboard, one showing vehicle statistics and the other controlling the in-car multimedia system. The car measures 3.45 metres (11 ft 4 in) in length and has a width of 1.63 metres (5 ft 4 in).

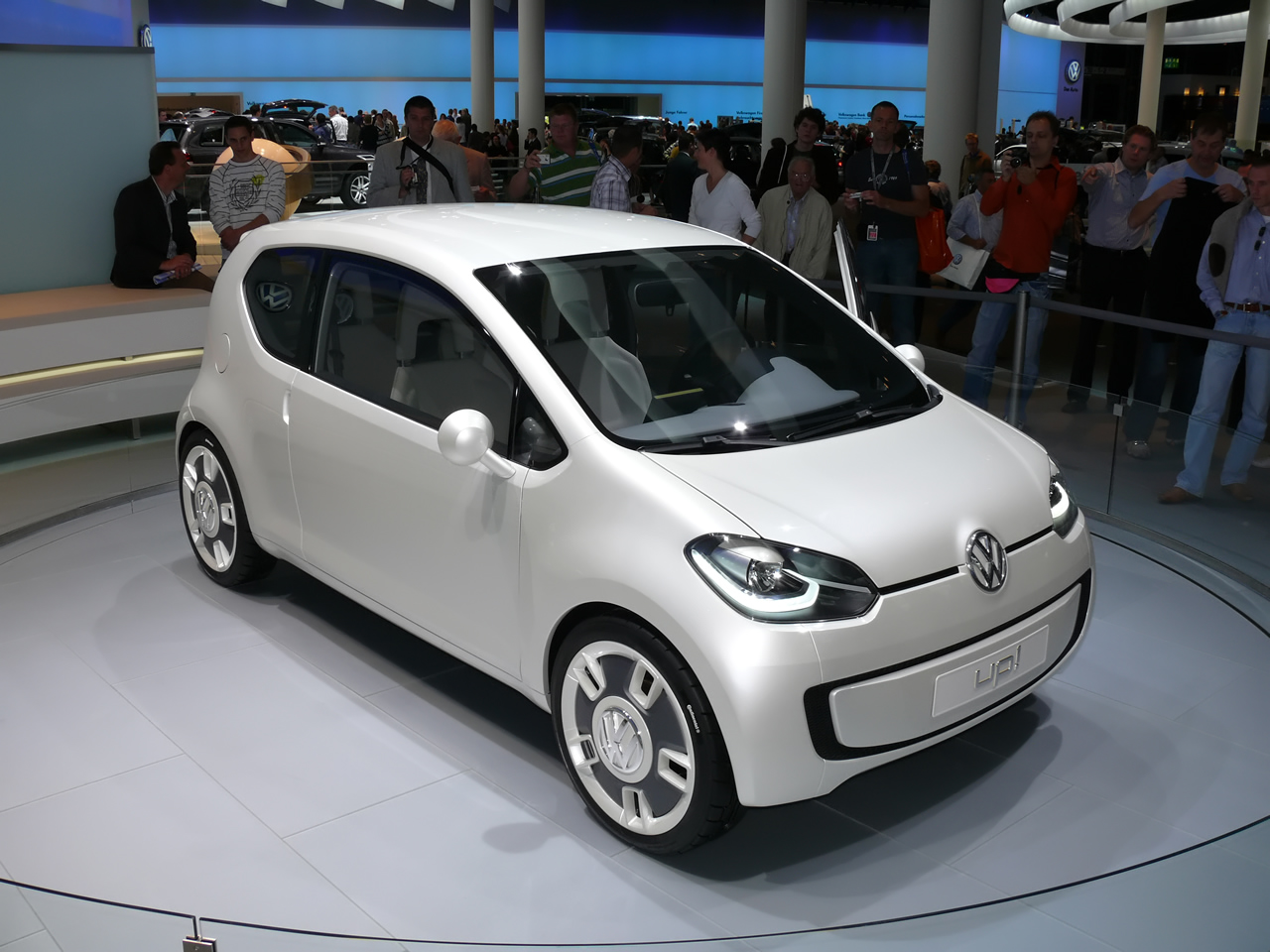
2007 up! concept

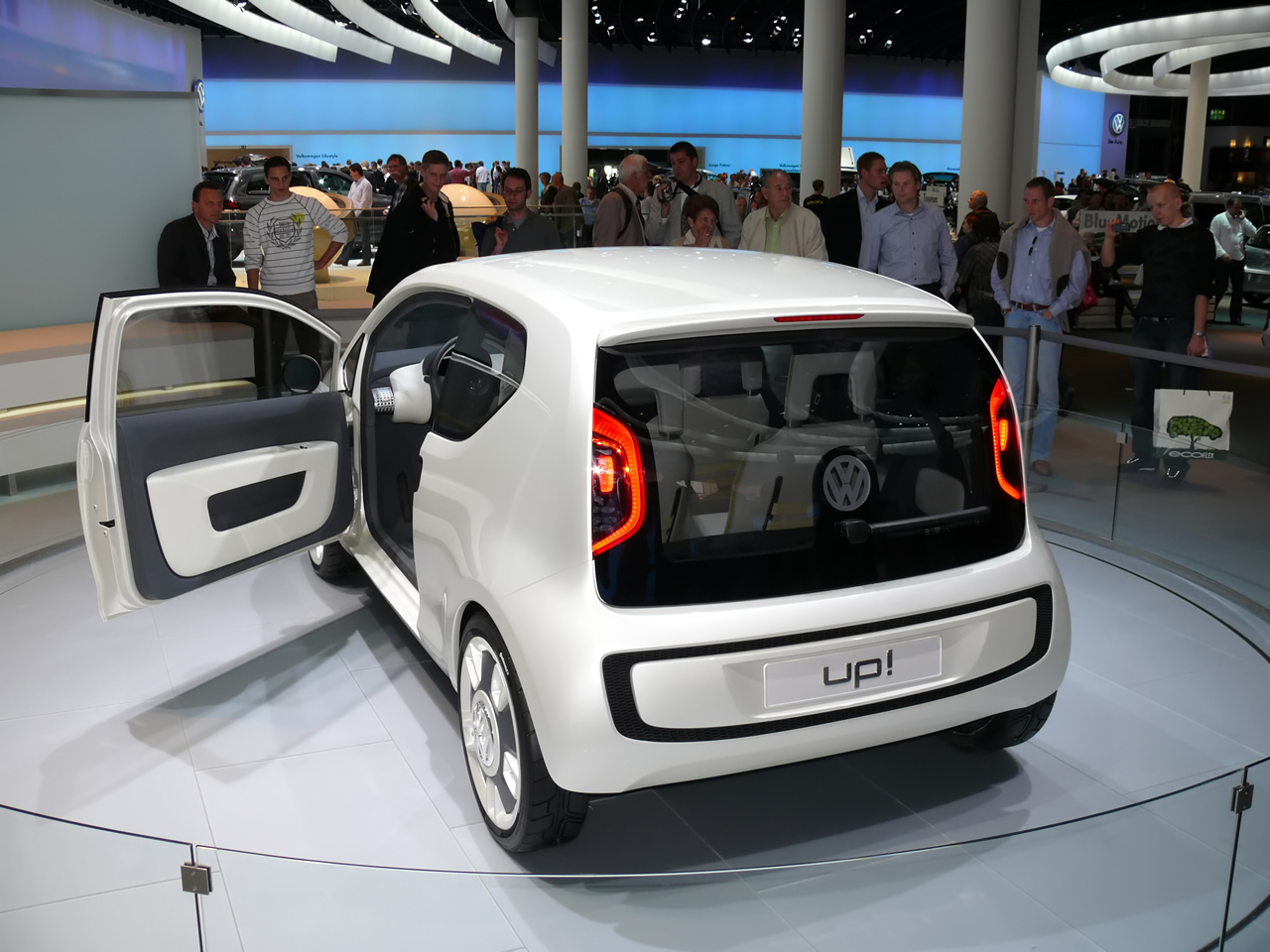
Rear view

=== 2007 Space Up concept ===
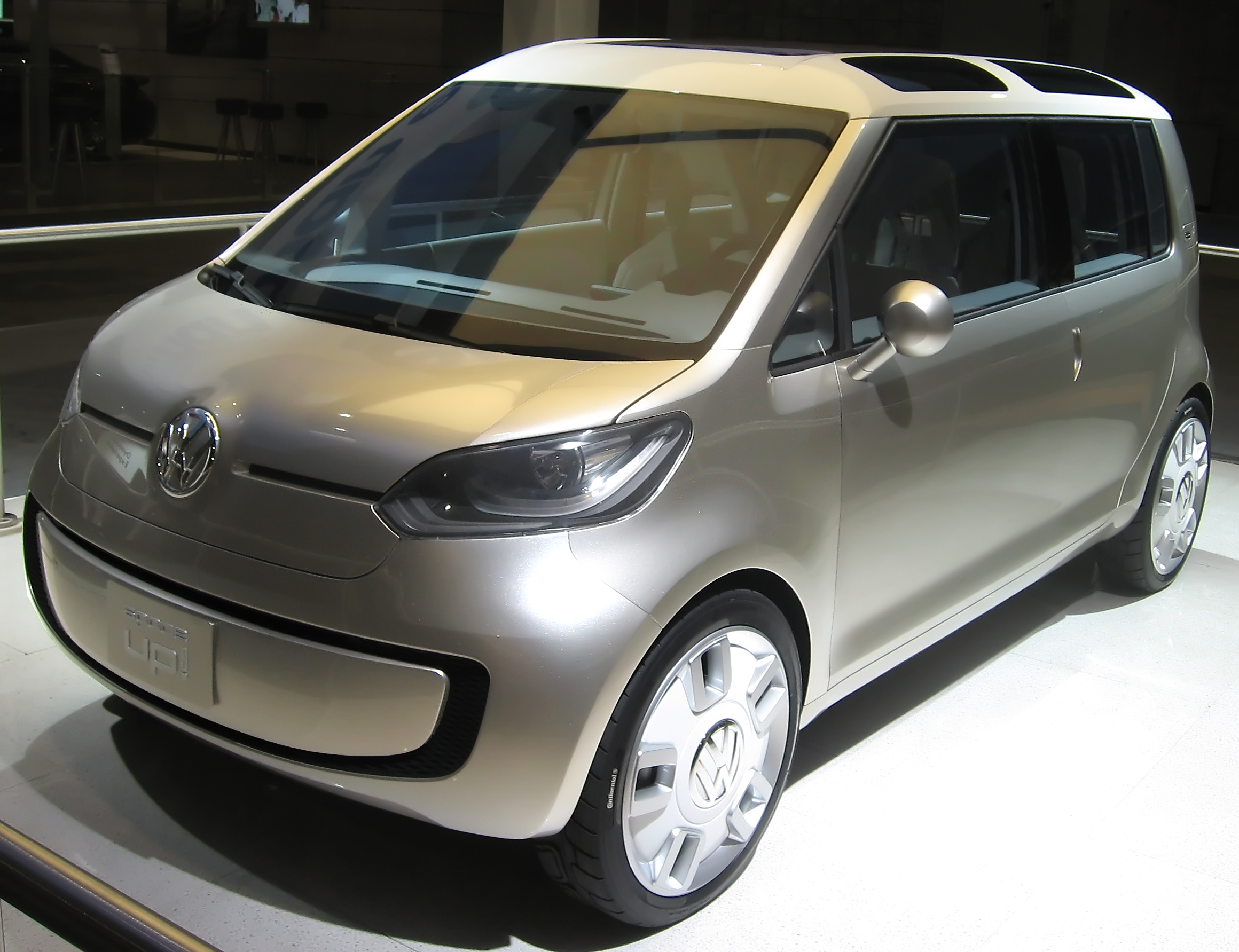
Volkswagen Space Up concept

The four-door four-seater mini MPV styled space up! concept car debuted at the 2007 Tokyo Auto Show in Japan.

The Space Up concept had all the features of the first concept, but with four-doors and 23 centimetres (9.1 in) longer at 3.68 metres (12 ft 1 in) (15 centimetres (5.9 in) shorter than the Volkswagen Fox). The 'butterfly' doors open in a similar manner to those on the Mazda RX-8; the front doors conventionally hinged at the front, whilst the rears are hinged at the rear from the C-pillar, eliminating the B-pillar. Its wheelbase is also larger at 2.56 metres (8 ft 5 in) but retains the same width as the Up at 1.63 metres (5 ft 4 in).

Also for the first time Volkswagen showed images of its internal combustion engine, a Fuel Stratified Injection (FSI) petrol engine.

=== 2007 Space Up Blue Concept ===
The four-seater space up! blue concept, the third variant of the Volkswagen Up concept series, debuted at the 2007 Los Angeles Auto Show.

The Space Up Blue was visually the same as the Space Up and shared its length and width, but it included a different roof with a 150 watt solar cell which recharges the batteries. This means its height increases to 1.57 metres (5 ft 2 in) and the curb weight is a 1,090 kg (2,403 lb).

Twelve lithium-ion batteries give the Space Up Blue 45 kW (61 PS; 60 bhp) of power and a 65 miles (105 km) range. Combined with Volkswagen's world's first hydrogen high temperature fuel cells (HT-FC), range is extended by 155 miles (250 km) giving total range of 220 miles (350 km).

=== 2009 E-up concept car ===
The two-door Volkswagen e-up! zero-emissions concept debuted at the 63rd International Motor Show Germany in 2009.

The 3.19 metres (10 ft 6 in) long all-electric E-up uses a 3+1 seat configuration. It uses a 60 kW (82 PS; 80 bhp) (continuously rated at 40 kW (54 PS; 54 bhp)) all-integrated drive electric motor, mounted at the front and drives the front wheels. This electric motor generates a torque turning force of 210 N⋅m (155 lb⋅ft) from rest. Power is sourced from 18 kilowatt-hours (kWh) lithium-ion batteries, which will give a range up to 130 km (81 miles). Quick charging will charge the battery up to 80% in an hour, while a regular 230 volt plug will take five hours. The roof of the E-up has a 1.4 square metre solar cell which supplies power to the vehicle's electrics, and when parked can power ventilation fans to help cool the interior when parked in bright sunlight on a hot day. The solar cells can be increased in size to a total area of 1.7 square metre by folding down the sun visors.

With a curb weight of 1,085 kg (2,392 lb), it can accelerate from rest to 100 km/h (62.1 mph) in 11.3 seconds; and should reach a top speed of 135 km/h (83.9 mph). The E-up concept is 3.19 metres (10 ft 6 in) long, 1.64 metres (5 ft 5 in) wide, 1.47 metres (4 ft 10 in) high, and has a wheelbase of 2.19 metres (7 ft 2 in).

Interior equipment includes a touch-screen human machine interface (HMI), one notable feature allows the charge to be delayed within the HMI programming, utilising cheap-rate night-time electricity—and this can also be remotely programmed via an iPhone or similar device.

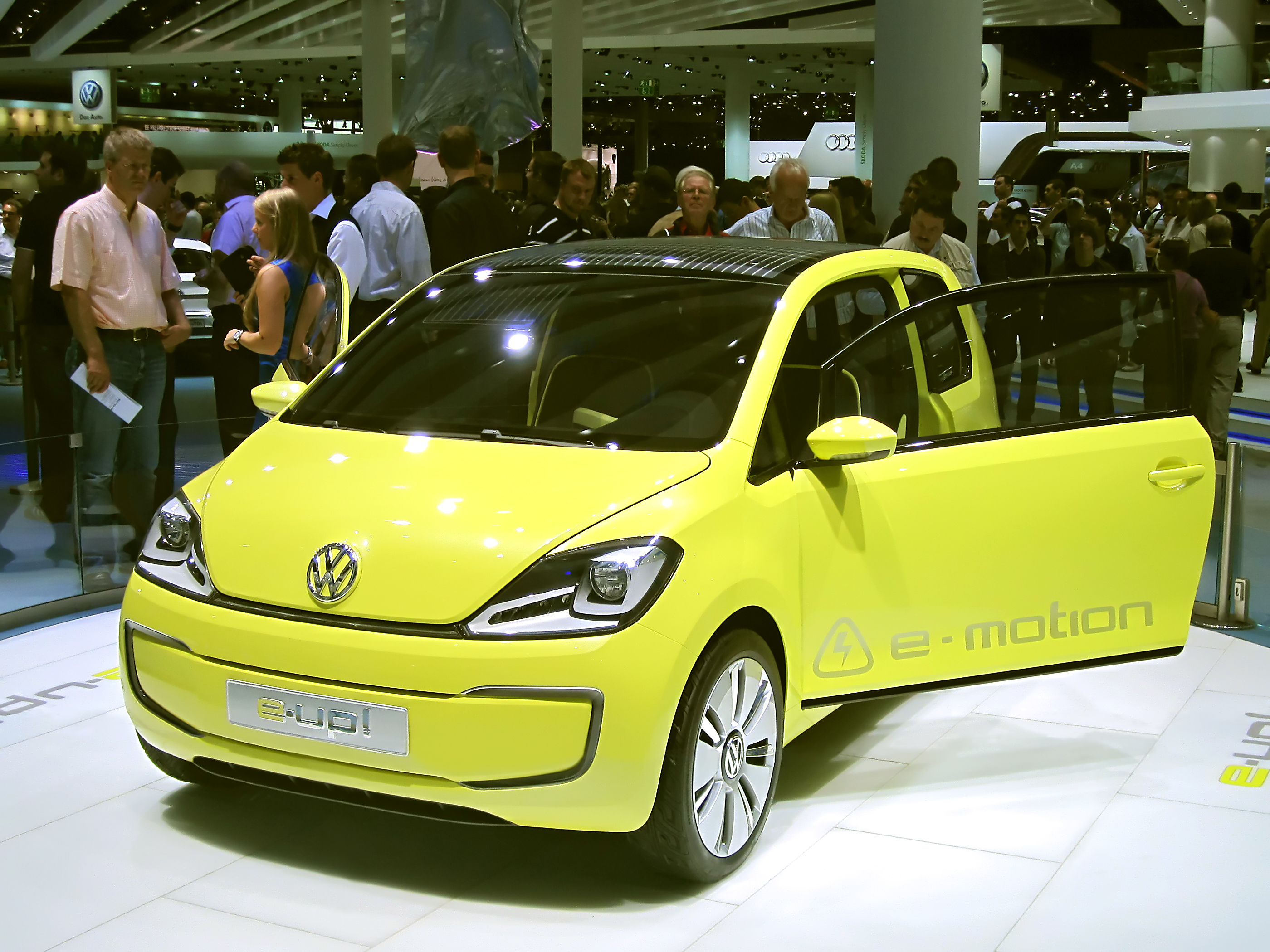
Volkswagen E-up concept car as shown at the IAA 2009

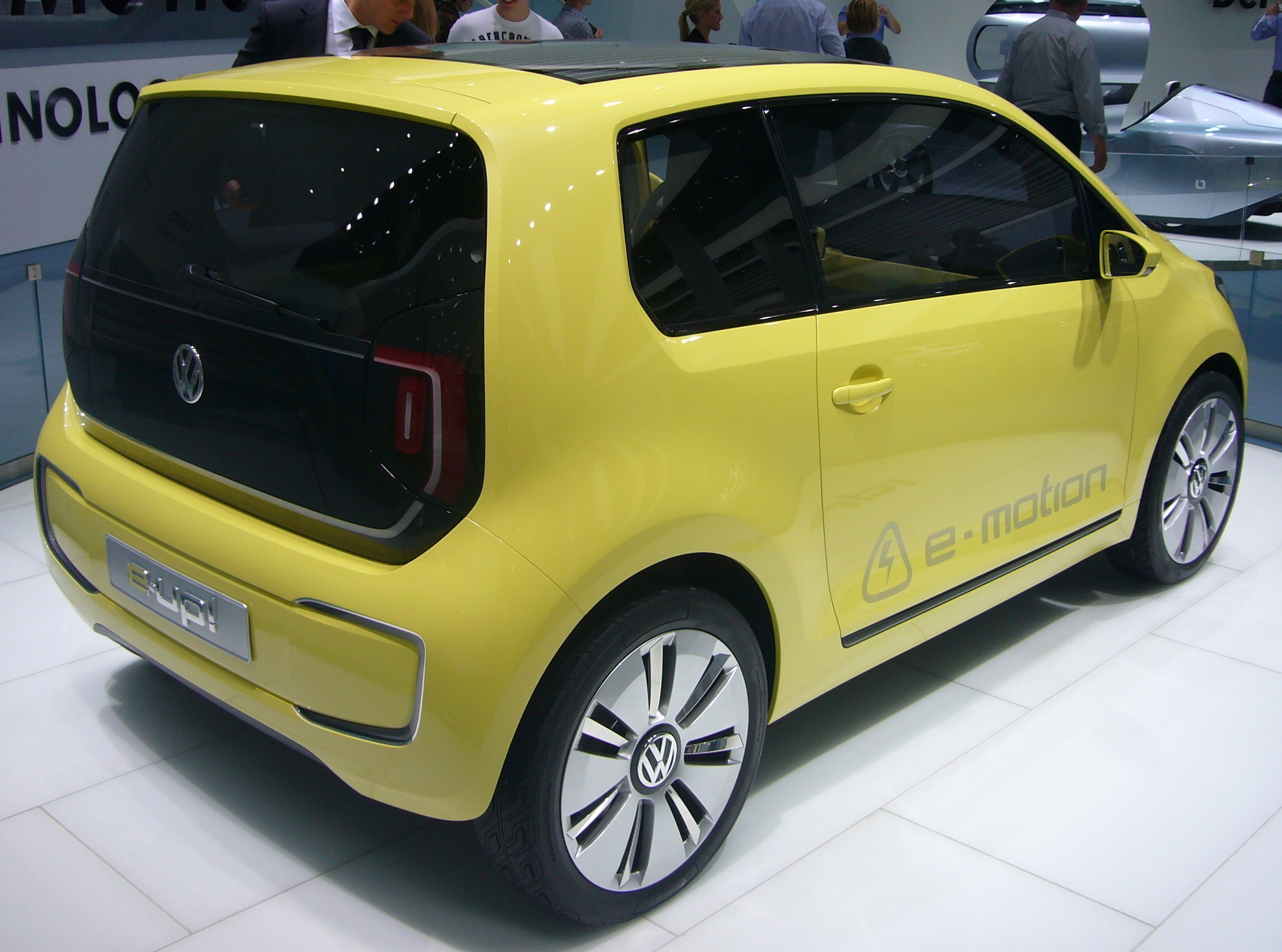
Rear view

=== 2009 Up Lite concept ===
The Volkswagen up! Lite was revealed at the 2009 Los Angeles Auto Show. It is a four-seater hybrid concept car based on Volkswagen L1 technologies. The Volkswagen Up Lite concept car has a hybrid powertrain with one 0.8 litres (48.8 cu in) two-cylinder Turbocharged Direct Injection (TDI) diesel engine and one 10 kW (14 PS; 13 bhp) electric motor, using a seven-speed dual-clutch transmission. Its technical dimension is about 3.84 metres (12 ft 7 in) in length, 1.60 metres (5 ft 3 in) in width and 1.40 metres (4 ft 7 in) high. It weighs 695 kg (1,532 lb), has a top-speed of 160 km/h (99 mph), and CO_{2} emission not more than 65 g/km.

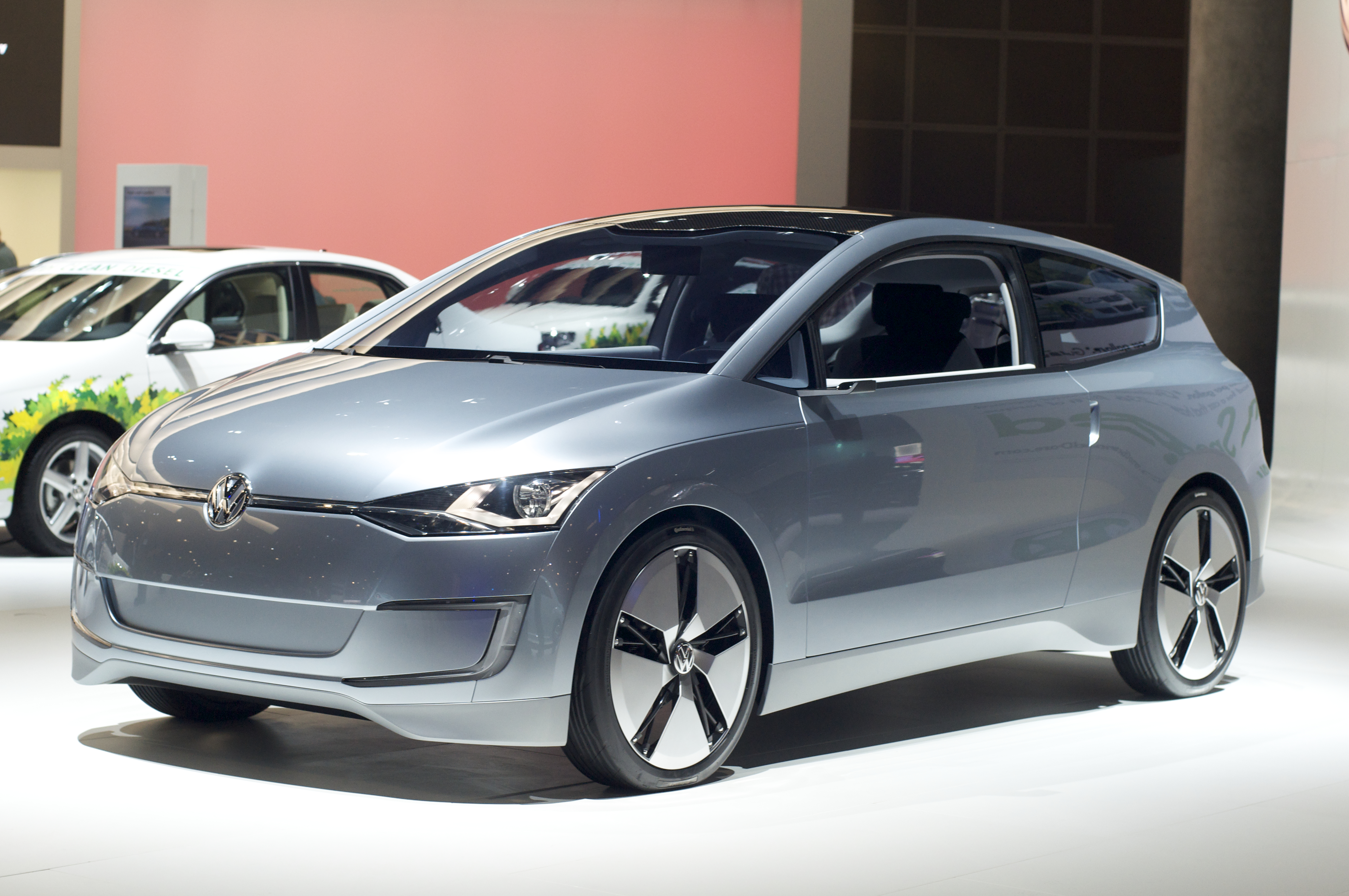
Volkswagen Up Lite at the 2009 LA Auto Show

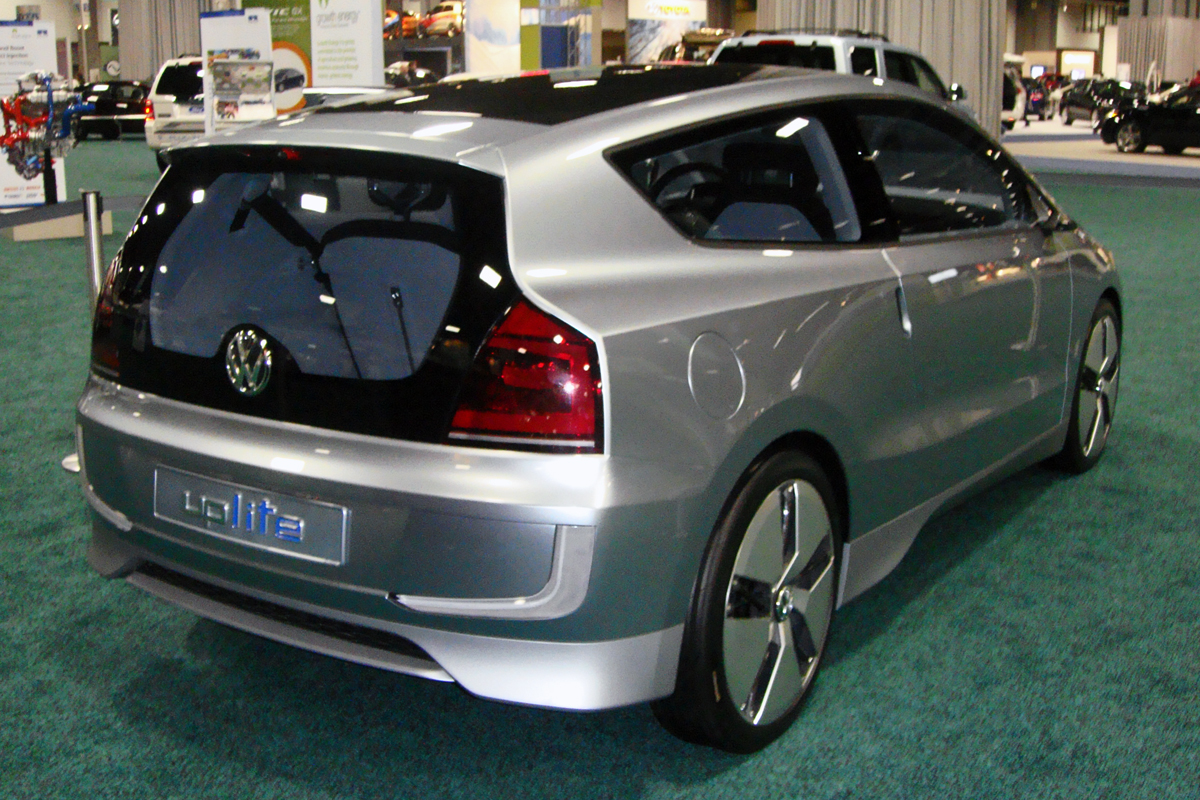
Rear view

=== 2010 Volkswagen IN ===
The Volkswagen IN is a design study created by Brazilian interns of Volkswagen do Brasil which carries a significant resemblance to the Up concept cars. It is a two-seater-plus-luggage sub-compact, capable of adopting a variety of powertrains, including a fully electric one using in-wheels electric engines. The mock-up in 1:1 scale was presented to the press on 29 January 2010.

=== 2011 Buggy Up ===
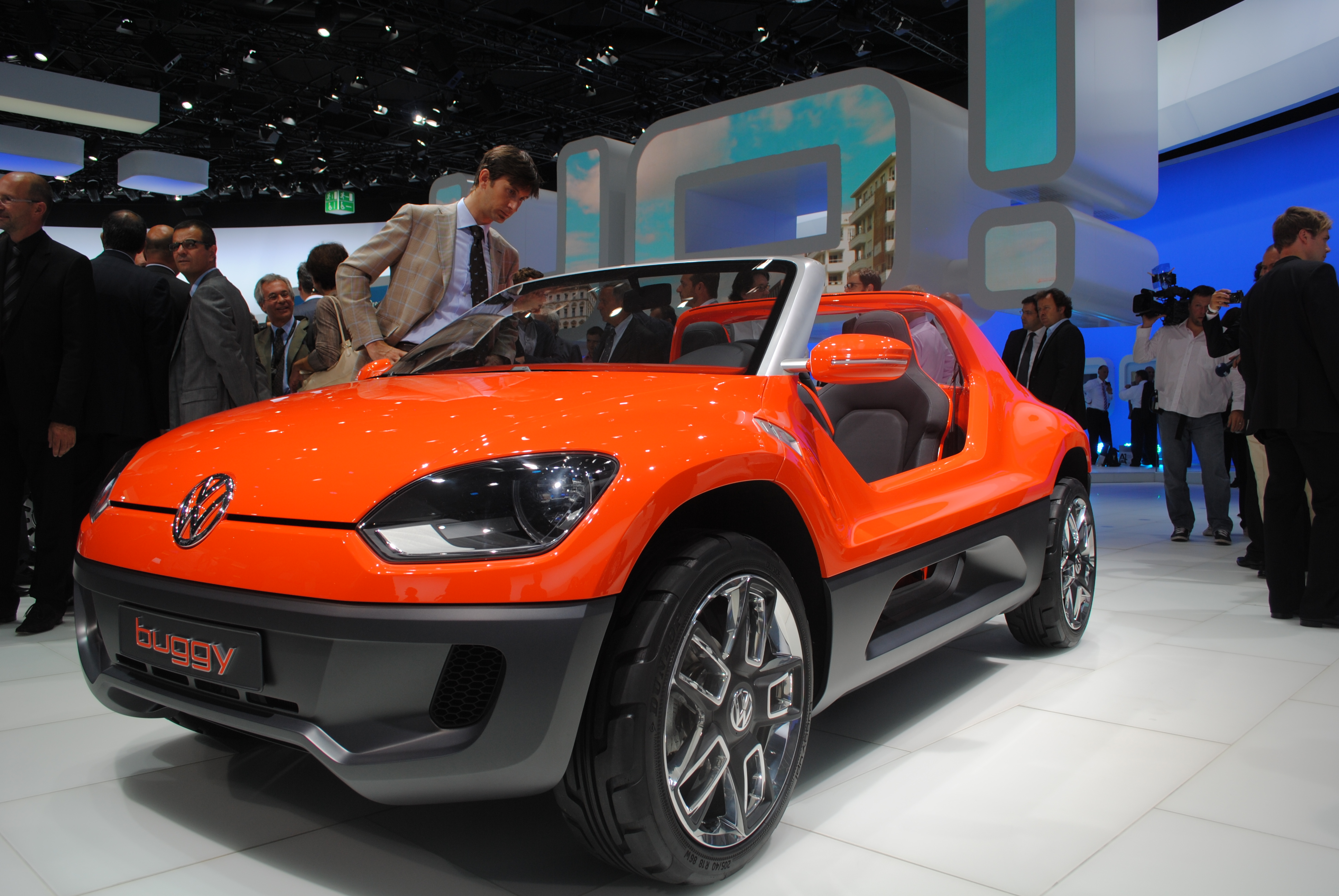
The Buggy Up at the 2011 Frankfurt Auto Show

The Volkswagen Buggy Up! concept debuted at the 2011 Frankfurt Auto Show in Germany.

The Buggy Up is a dune buggy based on the Up platform. It is 3,584 mm (141.1 in) long, 1,672 mm (65.8 in) wide, and 1,288 mm (50.7 in) tall. It has a door-less design, convertible canvas roof, waterproof interior, and a reinforced frame with ride height reduced by 0.8 inches (2.0 cm).

=== 2011 Up Azzurra Sailing Team ===
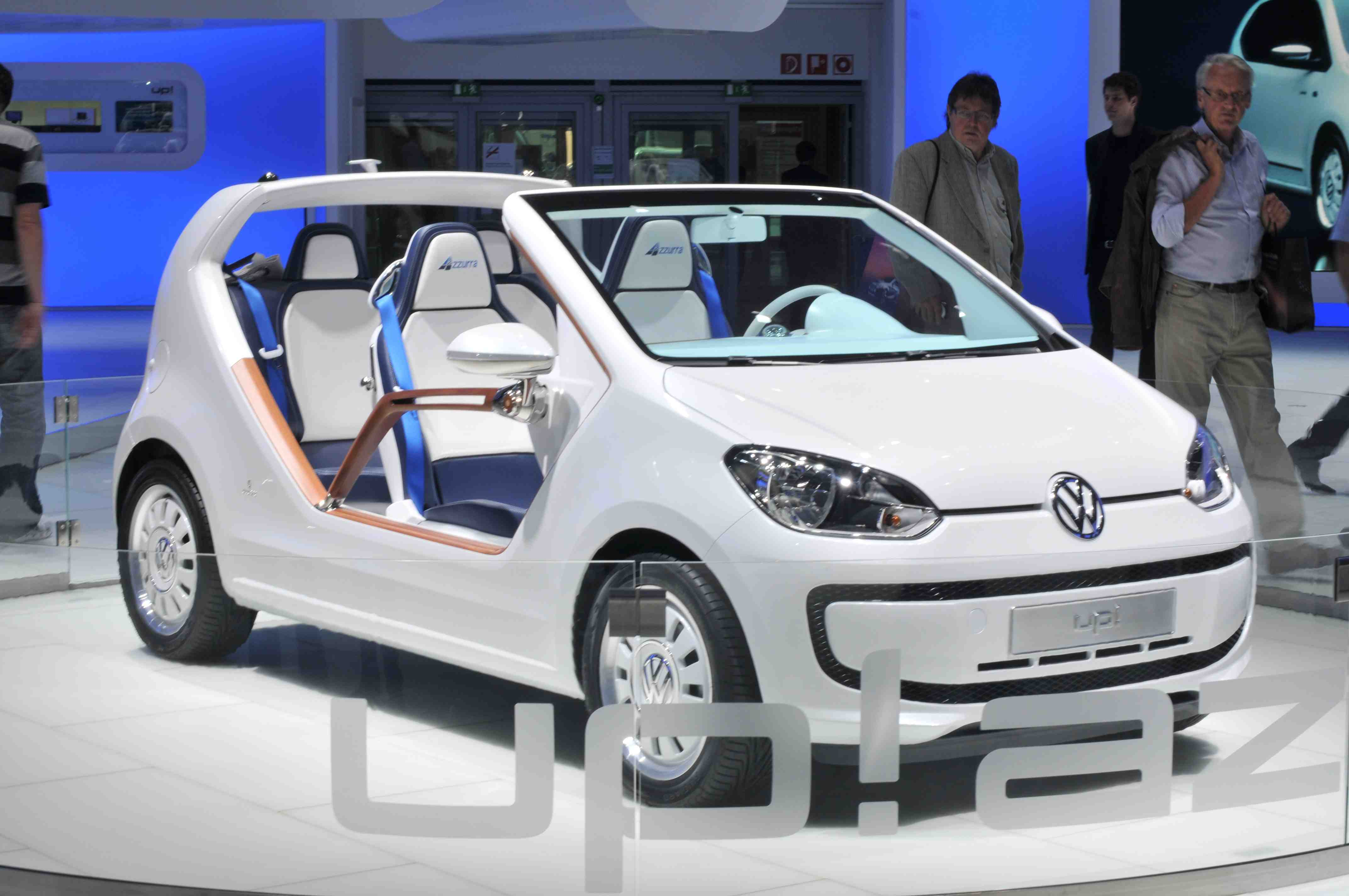
The Up Azzurra at the 2011 Frankfurt Auto Show

The Up! Azzurra Sailing Team concept debuted at the 2011 Frankfurt Auto Show in Germany.

The Azzurra was designed to look and feel like a luxury yacht, with a fully waterproof interior, blue and white leather seats, and chrome and wood trim. The rear seats have wooden backs, so when they are folded down the trunk looks like the deck of a yacht. It has no roof, and wooden railings in place of the doors and rear hatch.

== Awards ==
- Scottish Car of the Year 'Compact Car of the Year' 2012
- Top Gear Magazine 'Small Car of the Year' 2011
- What Car? 'Car of the Year' 2012
- What Car? 'City Car of the Year' 2013
- World Car of the Year 2012

== Sales ==
Year	Europe			Brazil	Argentina
Year	VW Up	SEAT Mii	Škoda Citigo	VW Up	VW Up
2011	4,582	372	419		
2012	113,827	18,827	27,673		
2013	130,039	28,608	44,851	108	
2014	124,845	24,865	40,616	58,896	4,976
2015	105,348	24,298	38,735	53,316	12,705
2016	96,836	19,882	38,664	38,358	11,668
2017	100,715	15,412	35,698	34,164	14,908
2018	97,366	13,031	36,450	20,564	15,677
2019	80,048	12,641	30,786	13,463	7,093
2020	59,578	7,790	14,120	6,926	2,417
2021	69,400	9,428	5,264	1,978	418
