= One Town, One Product =

One Town, One Product may refer to:

- One Town, One Product (Philippines)
- One Town One Product (Republic of China)

== See also ==
- One Tambon One Product, a program in Thailand
- One Village One Product, a program in Japan
