= Hyderabad Expo Center =

- Hyderabad Expo Center
- Interactive map of Hyderabad Expo Center
- Location: Phuleli, Shahrah-e-Liaquat, Hyderabad, Sindh, Pakistan
- Coordinates: 25°24′18.1″N 68°23′11.3″E
- Owner: Hyderabad Municipal Corporation
- Type: Conference centre/Arena
- Events: Exhibitions, Conferences

Construction
- Built: Feb 12, 2010

Hyderabad Expo Center was established by now defunct City District Government Hyderabad (CDGH) by the Mayor of Hyderabad, Kunwar Naveed Jamil. The main aim of the Expo Center is to introduce agricultural and industrial production of Hyderabad District, Sindh in the international market.

== Inauguration of Expo Center ==
Although Karachi Expo Centre and Lahore Expo Centers are established by the Trade Development Authority of Pakistan which is a department of the Federal Government of Pakistan, Hyderabad Expo Center, was built locally by the then district government out of its own budget. Hyderabad Expo Center was inaugurated on February 12, 2010 by Farooq Sattar.

Presently, Hyderabad Expo Center is one of the three expo centers operating in Pakistan. As of 2010, agricultural produce and industrial products worth $500 million were being exported from Hyderabad District to 41 foreign countries and this Hyderabad Expo Center would hopefully further improve those figures. After Karachi, Hyderabad is the second biggest economic hub in Sindh.

== Exhibitions ==
The inaugural Indonesia, Sindh Cultural Show of the artistes of Indonesia and Sindh was held at the Hyderabad Expo Center on 21 February 2010. This event was held to further strengthen the cultural and trade ties between Pakistan and Indonesia. Another exhibition at Hyderabad Expo Center was held on April 16, 2010 which was about agricultural produce and industrial exports from the district. Exhibition held in 2012 included stalls of balanced nutrition feed for livestock, handicrafts, bedding linen and electronics. It also had some stalls by Chinese traders.

A Mango Festival was organized by the Hyderabad Chamber of Commerce and Industry and the Trade Development Authority of Pakistan at Hyderabad Expo Center in June 2011 to promote the export of this 'king of fruit' – mango.

== See also ==
- Karachi Expo Center
- Lahore Expo Centre
