= Lux Style Awards =

Entertainment industry awards in Pakistan

- Current: 24th Lux Style Awards
- Native name: جوایز انداز لکس
- Awarded for: Excellence in Pakistani cinema, television, fashion, and music
- Country: Pakistan
- Presented by: Unilever Pakistan
- First award: 2002
- Website: www.luxstyle.pk

Television/radio coverage
- Network: PTV and private Pakistani channels

The Lux Style Awards is an annual entertainment awards ceremony held in Pakistan since 2002. The event recognises achievements in the Pakistani film, television, fashion, and music industries. Accolades are determined by industry panels alongside public voting segments for selected film and television categories.

The televised ceremonies have primarily taken place in Karachi, with editions also hosted in Lahore, Kuala Lumpur, and Dubai.

== History ==
The Lux Style Awards were established in 2002 by Musharaf Hai, then chairperson of Unilever Pakistan. It grew to become one of the country's primary annual entertainment awards ceremonies.

The 2008 ceremony was cancelled citing security and economic concerns. Organisers redirected event funds to establish educational scholarships for students at the National College of Arts, the National Academy of Performing Arts, and two regional fashion institutes.

Categories initially featured audience-voted Viewer's Choice awards for performance roles. In 2019, organisers introduced distinct Critics' Choice accolades alongside the viewer-voted categories to evaluate technical and artistic merit.

== Ceremonies ==
The following is a list of Lux Style Awards ceremonies held since 2002.

Ceremony	Date	Best Film	Venue
1st Lux Style Awards	18 February 2002	Tere Pyar Mein	Naval Base, Karachi
2nd Lux Style Awards	24 February 2003	Yeh Dil Aap Ka Huwa	Expo Centre, Karachi
3rd Lux Style Awards	13 March 2004	Larki Punjaban	Dubai, UAE
4th Lux Style Awards	15 March 2005	Salakhain	Expo Centre, Karachi
5th Lux Style Awards	21 February 2006	Koi Tujh Sa Kahan	Expo Centre, Karachi
6th Lux Style Awards	24 May 2007	Majajan	Kuala Lumpur, Malaysia
7th Lux Style Awards	29 October 2008	Khuda Kay Liye	Expo Centre, Karachi
8th Lux Style Awards	12 September 2009	Ramchand Pakistani	Expo Centre, Karachi
9th Lux Style Awards	28 February 2010	Nach Ke Yaar Manana	Expo Centre, Lahore
10th Lux Style Awards	10 March 2011	Not awarded	Expo Centre, Karachi
11th Lux Style Awards	16 September 2012	Bol	Expo Centre, Karachi
12th Lux Style Awards	4 July 2013	Not awarded	Expo Centre, Lahore
13th Lux Style Awards	4 December 2014	Zinda Bhaag	Mövenpick, Karachi
14th Lux Style Awards	30 September 2015	Na Maloom Afraad	Expo Centre, Karachi
15th Lux Style Awards	29 July 2016	Moor	Expo Centre, Karachi
16th Lux Style Awards	19 April 2017	Actor in Law	Expo Centre, Karachi
17th Lux Style Awards	20 February 2018	Punjab Nahi Jaungi	Expo Centre, Lahore
18th Lux Style Awards	7 July 2019	Cake	Expo Centre, Karachi
19th Lux Style Awards	17 December 2020	Laal Kabootar	Digital presentation
20th Lux Style Awards	9 October 2021	Not awarded	Expo Centre, Karachi
21st Lux Style Awards	24 November 2022	Khel Khel Mein	Expo Centre, Lahore
22nd Lux Style Awards	6 October 2023	Kamli (Critics' Choice); Quaid-e-Azam Zindabad (Viewers' Choice)	Expo Centre, Karachi
23rd Lux Style Awards	27 April 2025	Gunjal (Critics' Choice); Gunjal (Viewers' Choice)	Digital presentation
24th Lux Style Awards	11 December 2025	Kattar Karachi	Mohatta Palace, Karachi

== See also ==
- List of Nigar Awards
- List of Asian television awards
- List of fashion awards
- Hum Awards
- International Pakistan Prestige Awards
