= Pakistan Industrial Development Corporation =

Pakistani government-run corporation

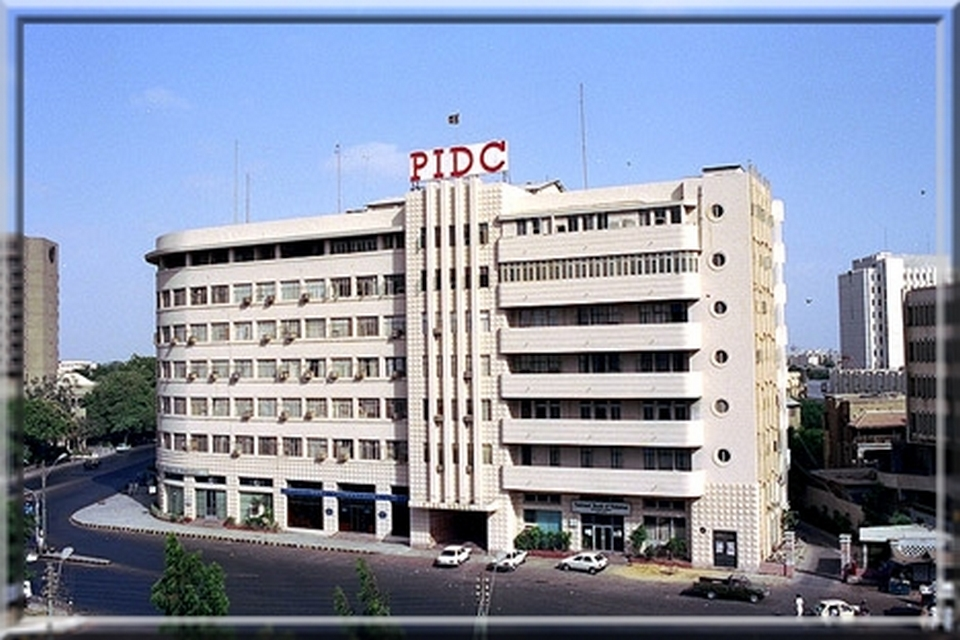

Pakistan Industrial Development Corporation (PIDC) (Urdu: پاکستان ہیئت برائے ارتقائے صنعت) is a state corporation of Pakistan working under Ministry of Industries and Production.

== History ==
Pakistan Industrial Development Corporation (PIDC) was founded as a state corporation under Pakistan's Ministry of Industries and Production in April 1951. It began operations in 1952. The PIDC board of directors included members of industrial families such as Naseer A. Sheikh of the Colony Group, Adamjee Group, and Syed Amjad Ali of the Wazir Ali Group. Its constitution articulated a primary objective of promoting industry rather than state ownership, with a policy to engage private capital and gradually transition its share capital to private investors.

Muhammad Ayub Khan invigorated PIDC which initiated new industries using government capital and sold them to private businessmen once they became profitable. Its strategic disinvestment policies significantly influenced the growth of major industrial conglomerates, particularly in East Pakistan, where groups such as Adamjee, Dawood, Amin, Crescent, Isphani, and Karim benefited from these policies by establishing large-scale industrial operations. In West Pakistan, notable projects included the Saigol Group's acquisition of the Jauharabad Sugar Mill and the Dawood Group's takeover of Burewala Textile Mills. PIDC facilitated the expansion and dominance of these industrial houses in Pakistan's economy, particularly in the jute and textile industries.

PIDC was created to set up industries in such fields where large capital was required and was difficult for the private sector and to set up industries in such backward areas to creating employment opportunities.

== Subsidiaries ==
=== National Industrial Parks Development and Management Company ===
National Industrial Parks Development & Management Company (NIP) was created in 2006.

NIP is a public-private partnership established to develop focused industrial growth in Pakistan by developing world-class industrial parks all over the country. The company was envisioned as a public-private hybrid. While it is a subsidiary of the PIDC, about 75% of its board members are from the private sector.

=== Technology Up-Gradation and Skills Development Company ===
Technology Up-Gradation & Skill Development Company (TUSDEC) has been incorporated in 2005 as a not for profit, guarantee limited company, a wholly owned subsidiary of Pakistan Industrial Development Corporation. Its functions include:

- Promote and establish Technology Upgradation and Skill Development Centres by establishing common facility, design, support and maintenance, applied research and dissemination centres.
- To up-grade and transfer technology in targeted industrial sectors to enhance their productivity and competitiveness in the local as well as global sphere.

=== Karachi Tools, Dies And Moulds Centre ===
KTDMC was incorporated as a "non-profit" organisation in 2006 under the Government's Public Private Partnership program. KTDMC is being managed by an independent board of directors a majority of whom are techno-preneurs from the private sector.

KTDMC train professionals in field of designing, engineering and manufacturing of tools, dies and moulds through computer aided design and manufacturing Computer-aided design(CAD), Computer-aided manufacturing (CAM) and computer aided engineering (CAE).This is particularly important for the small and medium businesses which cannot otherwise afford large investments to set up such facilities for themselves.

=== Pakistan Stone Development Company ===
Pakistan Stone Development Company (PASDEC) is a public limited company functioning on not for profit as a subsidiary of Pakistan Industrial Development Corporation (Pvt.) Ltd. under the Ministry of Industries & Production. PASDEC is mandated for the development, promotion and up-gradation of dimensional Stone sector in Pakistan and promote value addition and develop domestic and international markets by introducing modern know-how and equipment.

=== Pakistan Gems and Jewellery Development Company ===
Pakistan Gems and Jewellery Development Company (PGJDC) is a subsidiary of Pakistan Industrial Development Corporation, Ministry of Industries & Production. The charter of the Company is to enhance the value chain productivity of gems and jewellery industry of Pakistan from Mine to Market. The Company aims to enhance exports through facilitation, technology up-gradation, skill development and marketing/branding initiatives.

=== Pakistan Hunting and Sporting Arms Development Company ===
Pakistan Hunting & Sporting Arms Development Company (PHSADC) is a sector development company, a subsidiary of Pakistan Industrial Development Corporation (PIDC), Ministry of Industries & Production for promoting Gunsmith sector in the country. PHSADC has undertaken the tasks of up-gradation and standardisation of locally produced hunting & sporting arms to internationally acceptable standards.

=== Furniture Pakistan Company ===
Furniture Pakistan Company is a subsidiary company of PFID established in 2007 to upgrade the furniture industry of Pakistan ultimately to enhance its export.

=== Southern Punjab Embroidery Industry ===
Southern Punjab Embroidery Industries is a joint venture project of private Sector and Pakistan Industrial Development Corporation. The company was established to promote and facilitate the continuous growth of the Hand & Machine made embroidery industry to enhance the export of such products. The company supports the Embroidery Sector at large in upgrading-skill, development/diversification of Hand and Machine made Embroidery products, technical advice etc.

=== Aik Hunar Aik Nagar ===
Aik Hunar Aik Nagar (AHAN) is operating as a not-for-profit Company since 2007. IT is a subsidiary of Pakistan Industrial Development Corporation (PIDC), under administrative control of Ministry of Industries & Production.

AHAN aim to generate non-traditional employment opportunities in rural areas by adopting and indigenising the One Village One Product (OVOP) concept of Japan and One Tambon One Product (OTOP) of Thailand. The primary objective is to alleviate poverty in rural and semi urban areas of Pakistan by supporting rural based micro and small enterprises engaged in the production of non-farm goods.

=== Pakistan Chemical And Energy Sector Skills Development ===
Pakistan Chemical and Energy Sector Skills Development Company (PCESSDC) was incorporated as a non-profit public-private partnership in 2009. The purpose of the company is to promote, facilitate and provide education and training to a young and growing rural population in various disciplines of the chemical and energy sector in Pakistan. Its aim is to provide employment and invest in the productivity of locals for industrial development by establishing vocational education and training colleges (VETCs), technical training colleges (TTCs) and management schools.

== Liquidated projects ==
Some of the projects established by the PIDC were not successful, so they were liquidated upon bankruptcy. The details are given below:

Project name	Location	Founded	Liquidated	Reference(s)
Harnai Woolen Mills	Harnai	1953	2007	
Talpur Textile Mills	Tando Muhammad Khan	1958	2002-2005	
Larkana Sugar Mills	Naudero	1975	2000	
Shahdadkot Textile Mills	Shahdadkot	1981	2001	
Dir Forest Industries Complex	Chakdara	1982	2002	
Specialised Refractories Project (PCII Scheme)	-	1981	2002	

== Former subsidiaries ==
Company name	Location	Founded	Divestment year	Acquired by	Reference(s)
Adamjee Chemical Works	Nowshera	-	1964	Adamjee Group	
Adamjee High Grade Board Paper Mill	Nowshera	-	1964	Adamjee Group	
Bannu Woollen Mills	Bannu	1953	1964	Bibojee Group	
Bawany Sugar Mills	-	1964	1964	Bawany Group	
Charsadda Sugar Mills (now known as Saleem Sugar Mills)	Charsadda	-	1965	Hoti Group	
Crescent Jute Products	-	1964	1964	Crescent Group	
D.D.T. Factory	Nowshera	1963	1964	Adamjee Group	
Jauharabad Sugar Mills	Jauharabad	-	-	Saigol Group	
Karachi Gas Company	Karachi	-	-	Fancy Group	
Maple Leaf Cement	Daud Khel	1956	1992	Saigol Group	
Mirpurkhas Sugar Mills	Mirpurkhas	-	1964	Ghulam Faruque Group	

=== East Pakistan Industrial Development Corporation ===
- Adamjee Jute Mills, divested to Adamjee Group
- Amin Jute Mills, divested to Amin Group
- Chittagong Jute Manufacturing, divested to Ispahani Group
- Karnaphuli Paper Mills, divested to Dawood Group in 1964
- Karim Jute Mills, divested to Karim Group
- Latif Bawany Jute Mills, divested to Bawany Group
- Peoples Jute Mills, divested to Fancy Group
- Nishat Jute Mills, divested to Nishat Group

== See also ==
- Pakistan Small and Medium Enterprise Development Authority (SMEDA)
- Pakistan Gems and Jewellery Development Company
- Industry of Pakistan
- Economy of Pakistan
- Small and Medium Enterprise Development Authority
