= Al Fazal Town, Phuleli =

Coordinates: 25°24′N 68°23′E

Al Fazal Town is a section of Phuleli, the name of a canal as well as a district of the city of Hyderabad, Pakistan. It was established in 1950.

Al Fazal has a famous mosque, but is religiously and ethnically diverse.

The town faces issues relating to infrastructure, including lack of sewers, raw sewage backing up in the streets, roads in disrepair, and flooding.

== See also ==
- Nursing in Pakistan
