= Atlas Bangladesh Limited =

Motorcycle manufacturer

- Founded: 1966; 60 years ago
- Founder: Yusuf H. Shirazi
- Headquarters: Dhaka, Bangladesh
- Area served: Bangladesh
- Website: www.atlas.gov.bd

Atlas Bangladesh Limited (Bengali: এটলাস বাংলাদেশ লিঃ) is a Bangladesh government owned company that imports and manufactures motorcycles in Bangladesh. It is part of the Bangladesh Steel and Engineering Corporation.

== History ==
Atlas Bangladesh Limited was established in 1966 by Shirazi Group with support from Honda Motor Company Limited. After the independence of Bangladesh, the company was nationalised by the Government of Bangladesh. In 1987, the company was converted to a Public Limited Company.

In 1993 the company signed an agreement with Hero Honda to assemble the companies motorcycles in Bangladesh. After Hero Honda split the two companies, Hero MotoCorp and Honda, entered Bangladesh market separately which ended their relationship with Atlas Bangladesh Limited in 2013. After Atlas Bangladesh Limited signed a partnership agreement with Zongshen motorcycle company to assemble their motorcycles in Bangladesh. This has not helped sales, Atlas Bangladesh was sold 50 thousand motorcycles in 2012 but by 2017 sales had decreased to 1,500 unit per year.

Atlas Bangladesh Limited signed an agreement with TVS Auto Bangladesh Limited in February 2019 to manufacture TVS brand motorcycles at the factory of Atlas Bangladesh Limited.
