= TDAP (disambiguation) =

TDAP may refer to:

- Tdap and TDaP, DPT vaccines
- Trade Development Authority (Pakistan)
- Taught degree awarding powers, granted by the Privy Council of the United Kingdom
