= Yusuf H. Shirazi =

Pakistani industrialist (1929–2019)

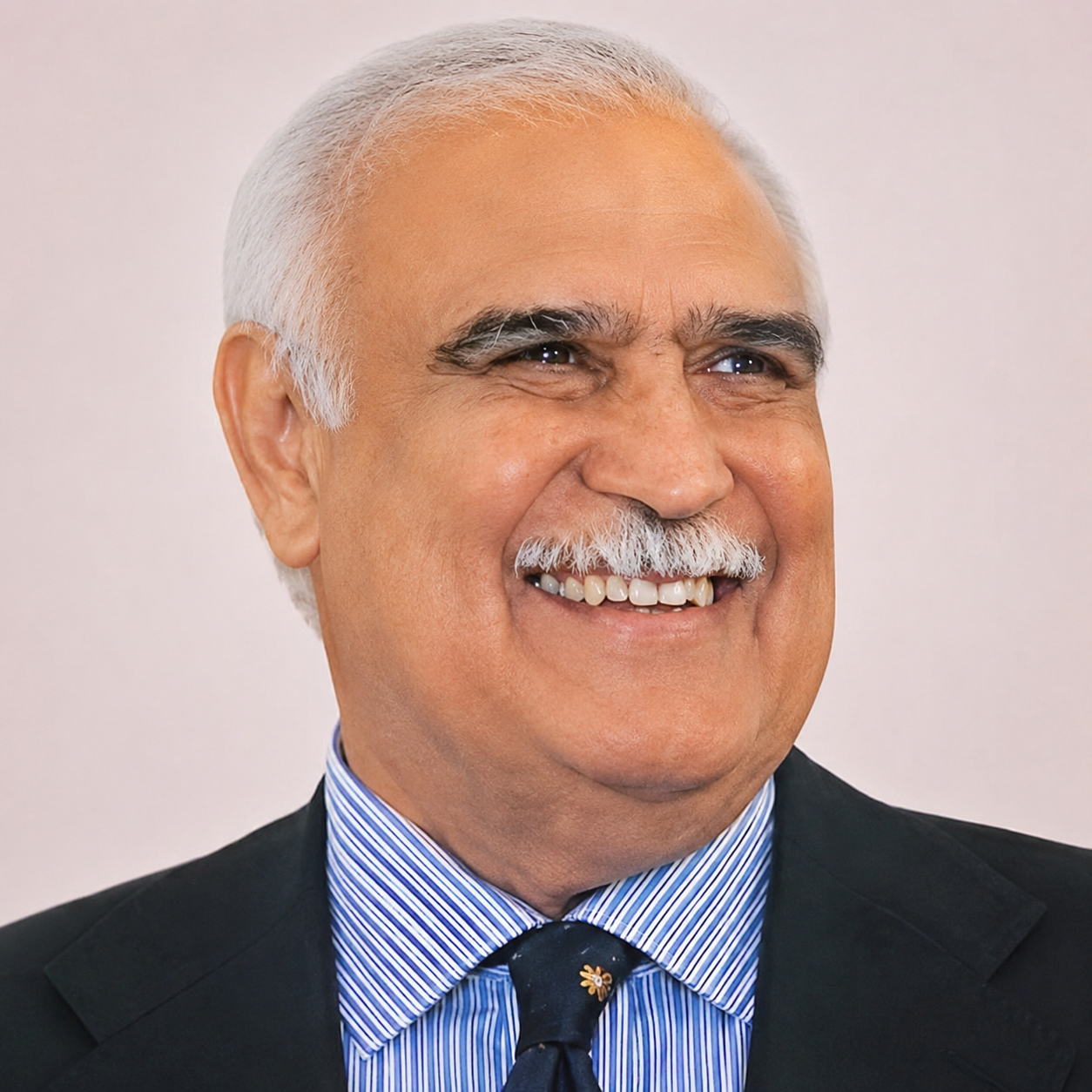
- Born: 1929; Sahiwal, Punjab, British India (now Pakistan)
- Died: 2019 (aged 89–90)
- Education: Government College Sahiwal; Forman Christian College
- Alma mater: University of the Punjab
- Occupations: Industrialist, civil servant, writer
- Organization: Atlas Group
- Known for: Founder of Atlas Group and Atlas Honda
- Title: President of the Karachi Chamber of Commerce & Industry (1968)
- Awards: Sitara-i-Imtiaz (2012)

Yusuf H. Shirazi (1929–2019) was a Pakistani industrialist, civil servant, and writer. He founded the Atlas Group of Companies in 1962 and served as its chairman. Under his leadership, the group expanded into engineering, power generation, financial services, and trading. He was a founding member of the Pakistan Automotive Manufacturers Association (PAMA).

The Yusuf H. Shirazi Complex at the Lahore University of Management Sciences is named after him.

== Early life and education ==
Shirazi was born in Sahiwal, Punjab, Pakistan. He received his early education from the Government College Sahiwal. For further studies, he moved to Lahore and attended Forman Christian College, where he earned a bachelor's degree. He later obtained postgraduate degrees in Persian and mathematics from the University of the Punjab.

== Civil Service Career ==
Shirazi began his career in journalism, working for publications such as the Pakistan Times and Nawa-i-waqt while studying law at Punjab University. In 1953, he cleared the CSS exam and became an income tax officer, initially posted in Shikarpur before transferred to Karachi.

In 1962, Shirazi was assigned to compile a report on the leading business groups of Pakistan. He conducted interviews and, in the process, built relationships with the leading business families of Pakistan. Later, he was asked to serve as an executive director at Mian Muhammad Yahya's Nishat Group and was a board member of Ghandhara Industries Limited, positions he held into the 1980s.

== Atlas Group ==
In 1963, Shirazi left the civil service to start a business. He co-founded a brokerage firm with his brother based in Karachi Stock Exchange, which laid the foundation for the establishment of the Atlas Group, named after the Greek mythological figure Atlas. Later, he co-founded Atlas Honda in a joint venture with Honda.

In 1968, Shirazi was elected as president of the Karachi Chamber of Commerce & Industry, serving two consecutive terms.

Following the independence of East Pakistan, the Atlas Group continued to service their loans despite losses, including the loss of their Dhaka motorcycles factory. Later, he established Atlas Asset Management, acquired Atlas Insurance, and expanded into the trading sector in collaboration with General Electric.

== Education philanthropy ==
Shirazi was among the founding members of the Lahore University of Management Sciences (LUMS) and Ghulam Ishaq Khan Institute of Engineering Sciences and Technology (GIK Institute). Through the Atlas Group, he contributed to the National Management Foundation, the sponsoring body of LUMS, and to scholarships for financially disadvantaged students.He also founded the Harvard Club of Pakistan and funded a program that sent two Pakistanis each year for training at Harvard University.

An academic facility at the university, the Yusuf H. Shirazi Complex, was named after Shirazi. Construction of the multi-disciplinary complex began with a groundbreaking ceremony in 2023.

== Writings ==
Shirazi wrote throughout his business career and was a regular columnist for English-language newspapers in Pakistan. His books include Aid or Trade , a collection of his writings on pakistan's economy.

== Death ==
Shirazi died on October 20, 2019, in Karachi.

== Awards and recognition ==
- Sitara-i-Imtiaz (2012)

== Bibliography ==
- Safeguarding Sovereignty (2013)
- Aid or Trade (2015)
