= Government Graduate College Sahiwal =

Government college in Sahiwal, Punjab, Pakistan

Govt. Graduate College Sahiwal
- Motto: Courage to Unite
- Type: Education and Research
- Established: 1942
- Affiliations: University of Punjab, BISE, Sahiwal
- Principal: Mumtaz Ahmad
- Faculty: 128
- Students: 3000
- Location: Sahiwal, Punjab, Pakistan
- Campus: Urban
- Website: gpgcs.edu.pk

Government Graduate College Sahiwal, formerly known as Government College Montgomery, is a government college in Sahiwal, Punjab, Pakistan. It is situated adjacent to Canal Colony and near Farid Town.

== History ==
The college was established in 1942 in a rented building on the city's circular road, initially offering art classes at the intermediate and degree levels. Science classes at the Bachelor of Science level were introduced in 1950, and the college was affiliated with Punjab University, Lahore.

In 1969, it became a postgraduate college, starting with M.Sc. in physics degree program. Over the years, postgraduate classes in botany, chemistry, English, economics, mathematics, statistics, political science, and Urdu were added.

The campus, planned before Pakistan's independence, was constructed in 1951 through the efforts of college professors, including Muhammad Jahangir Khan and Abdul Aleem Farooqi.

In 2022, the college was renamed Government Graduate College for Boys Sahiwal by the Government of Punjab, Pakistan.

== Facilities ==
The college is situated on lands of 100 acres (0.40 km^{2}) and features several buildings. These include the main college building, which is divided into intermediate and bachelors sections, and two library buildings: Malik Anwar Library and Majeed Amjad Library. Other facilities include a cafeteria, a recreational building with a swimming pool, two mosques, and three hostel buildings: Jinnah Hall, Iqbal Hall, and Fatima Hall. There is also a building for the Directorate of Education Colleges, Sahiwal Division, Sahiwal, and another for the Board of Intermediate and Secondary Education, Sahiwal.

The principal of the college lives on-campus in a purpose-built residence.

== Departments and faculty ==
Government Postgraduate College Sahiwal has 20 departments:

- Department of Botany & Biology
- Department of Chemistry
- Department of Computer Science
- Department of Education
- Department of English
- Department of Economics
- Department of Geography
- Department of Health & Physical Education
- Department of History
- Department of Islamiat
- Department of Mass Communication
- Department of Mathematics
- Department of Philosophy
- Department of Persian
- Department of Physics
- Department of Political Science
- Department of Punjabi
- Department of Sociology
- Department of Statistics
- Department of Urdu

== Degree programs ==
Govt. Post Graduate College Sahiwal is offering following list of programs;

- M.Sc (Physics, Chemistry, Botany, Mathematics and Statistics) (2 years)
- MA (English, Urdu and Economics) (2 years)
- BS (Honors) degree Programs (4 years)
- F.Sc (Pre-Engineering, Pre-Medical)
- FA (Arts, General Science)
- ICS (Computer Science)
- Short Courses

== Notable alumni ==
- Yusuf H. Shirazi, founder of Atlas Group
- Javed Ilyas, Pakistani cricketer
