= Hero Honda CD 100 =

Motorcycle introduced by Honda in 1985

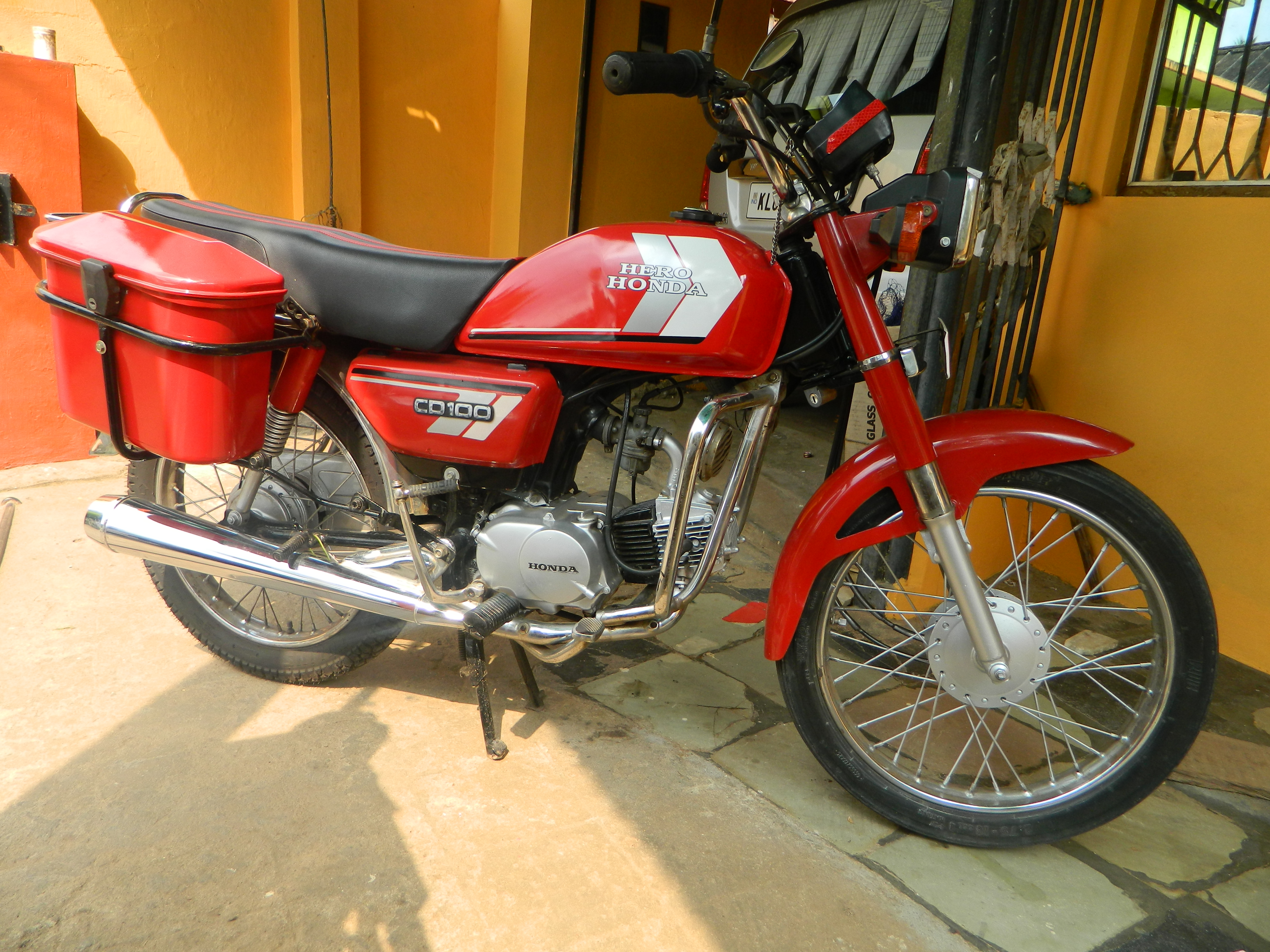
- Manufacturer: Hero Honda (formerly); Hero MotoCorp (currently)
- Parent company: Honda Motor Company
- Production: 1985–present
- Related: Honda CD70

CD 100 (launched as Hero Honda CD 100) is a standard lightweight motorcycle released by Hero Honda joint-venture as their first official bike in India.

== Advertising campaign ==
Indian actor Salman Khan was the first person to be featured in the first ever motorcycle commercial in India.
