= Habibullah Khan Khattak =

British-Indian and Pakistan Army General

Habibullah Khan Khattak SPk LoM
- Born: 17 October 1913; Wana, Waziristan, British India
- Died: 23 December 1994 (aged 81)
- Children: Raza Kuli Khan Khattak
- Military career
- Allegiance: (British Raj) British India (1935–1947); Pakistan (1947–1959)
- Branch: (British Raj) British Indian Army; Pakistan Army
- Service years: 1935–1959
- Rank: Lieutenant General
- Nickname: Bibojee
- Unit: 12th Battalion The Baloch Regiment
- Commands: 1 Bihar; Deputy C-in-C of the Pakistan Army
- Conflicts: World War II: Burma Campaign
- Awards: Sitara-e-Pakistan; Legion of Merit
- Other work: Industrialist and Politician

Habibullah Khan Khattak, also known as Muhammad Habibullah Khan (17 October 1913 – 1994), was a Pakistani Army officer born in Wana, Khyber Pakhtunkhwa, Pakistan.

He was the son of Khan Bahadur Kuli Khan Khattak, and the younger brother of former Governor Khyber Pakhtunkhwa Aslam Khattak and older brother of former Federal Minister Yusuf Khattak and Begum Kulsum Saifullah Khan.

His son Ali Kuli Khan Khattak also rose to the rank of lieutenant general and retired as the Chief of General Staff (CGS) in 1998. His son, like him, belonged to the famed Baloch Regiment.

== Military career pre-WW2 ==
After completing intermediate education from Islamia College, Peshawar, he was one of the 25 people selected from British India for the first course at the Indian Military Academy, Dehradun. He was commissioned a second lieutenant 1 February 1935 and attached to the 2nd battalion South Staffordshire Regiment 24 February 1935. He was posted to his permanent British Indian Army unit, 5th battalion, 10th Baluch Regiment on 24 February 1936. His seniority as a second lieutenant was antedated to 4 February 1934 and he was promoted to lieutenant 4 May 1936.

== Action in World War II ==
He was promoted to captain on 4 February 1942. By April 1944, he was serving with the Bihar Regiment. During World War II, he campaigned in Burma and was amongst a handful of Indian officers to have commanded an infantry battalion at war. He was mentioned in dispatches for service in Burma in the London Gazette 10 January 1946 as temporary Major, Bihar Regiment.

== Pakistan Army career ==
His rapid rise in the Pakistan Army saw him as a two-star general at the age of 40, and at this rank he held the appointments of a divisional commander, of the Chief of Training Pakistan Army, of the Chief of General Staff and of the first Military Commander of the Baghdad Pact. In December 1958, he graduated from the Imperial Defence College, London (now the RCDS) and was promoted to lieutenant general rank and appointed as Deputy C-in-C of the Pakistan Army. He was prematurely retired in October 1959 at the age of 46.

For his services, he was awarded the 3rd highest civilian award of Sitara-e-Pakistan, which follows the Nishan-e Pakistan and the Hilal-e-Pakistan. He was also presented with the Legion of Merit by the President of the United States authorised by act of Congress for exceptionally meritorious conduct.

In 1991, he was invited by the regiment he had commanded, the Bihar Regiment of Indian Army, to participate in its Golden Jubilee. He attended the ceremonies.

== Politics ==
After his premature retirement from the Army, Khattak became closely involved in the private industry sector through his company Ghandhara Industries, which he founded on 23 February 1963 and which is headquartered in Karachi, Pakistan. This company produces pickup trucks, buses and heavy trucks. This was the first company in the Bibojee Group conglomerate.

He also served as a federal minister during Zia-ul Haq's time and made an abortive attempt to contest elections from his home constituency of Karak.

== Death ==
General Habibullah Khan Khattak died in 1994.

Military offices
Preceded by Sher Ali Khan Pataudi	Chief of General Staff	Succeeded by Yahya Khan
