= Small and Medium Enterprise Development Authority =

Autonomous organisation of the Pakistani government

Small and Medium Enterprises Development Authority (SMEDA; Urdu: اختیاریہَ برائے متوسط و خرد کاراندازی) is an autonomous institution of the Government of Pakistan under the Ministry of Industries and Production. SMEDA was established in October 1998 for encouraging and facilitating the development and growth of small and medium enterprises in the country.

SMEDA is not only an SME policy-advisory body for the Government of Pakistan but also facilitates other stakeholders in addressing their SME development agendas. Its main objective is to formulate policy to encourage the growth of SMEs in the country and to advise the government on SME-related fiscal and monetary issues.

== See also ==
- Pakistan Industrial Development Corporation
- Pakistan Gems and Jewellery Development Company
- Trade Development Authority of Pakistan
