= Bibojee Group =

Pakistani conglomerate

- Company type: Corporate group
- Traded as: PSX: BNWM; PSX: GAMON; PSX: GAL; PSX: GHNI; PSX: GTYR; PSX: JDMT; PSX: UVIC
- Founded: 1960; 66 years ago
- Founders: Gohar Ayub Khan; Habibullah Khan Khattak
- Headquarters: Karachi, Pakistan
- Subsidiaries: Ghandhara Automobiles Limited; Ghandhara Industries Limited; Ghandhara Tyre
- Website: bibojee.com.pk

Bibojee Group (Urdu pronunciation: [biː.boˈdʒiː] bee-bo-JEE) is a group of companies headquartered in Karachi.

== History ==
Bibojee Group was founded by Pakistan Army officer Lieutenant General Habibullah Khan Khattak, nicknamed "Bibo" or "Bibojee," from whom the conglomerate took its name.

In 1960, Khattak established the Janana De Malucho Textile Mills in Kohat with an initial capacity of 12,500 spindles and 250 weaving looms. The same year, he founded The Universal Insurance Company Limited, a general insurance business that entered the market with reinsurance partnerships in Germany, Japan, and Korea. In 1963, Khattak, together with his son-in-law Gohar Ayub Khan, acquired the Karachi-based General Motors Overseas Distribution Corporation plant from General Motors and renamed it Ghandhara Industries Limited. In 1964, the group acquired Bannu Woollen Mills Limited from the Pakistan Industrial Development Corporation following the agency's disinvestment program. Khattak set up a second Kohat-based spinning mill, Babri Cotton Mills, in 1970.

In August 1969, following the political overthrow of President Ayub Khan, Gohar Ayub Khan sold his shares in Ghandhara Industries to the National Investment Trust and the Investment Corporation of Pakistan.

Between 1972 and 1977, most of the group's industrial holdings were nationalised under the government of Zulfikar Ali Bhutto. Ghandhara Industries was renamed National Motors Limited and the textile mills were temporarily shut down. Ghandhara Diesels Limited, which was established two years ago to manufacture diesel engines under the Bedford brand was also nationalised and renamed as Bela Engineers Limited. The government also cancelled the contract to sell Bannu Sugar Mills and Sutlej Textile Mills to Bibojee Group. During this period, the group continued to operate primarily through Bibojee Services, which was formally incorporated as a private company in September 1981 to act as managing agent and trustee. In 1977, Bibojee acquired a 90 percent stake in The General Tyre and Rubber Company of Pakistan from the United States-based General Tire International Corporation (GTIC); the remaining 10 percent stake was retained by GTIC and later transferred to Continental AG of Germany when it acquired GTIC in 1987. In 1979, the group acquired Rahman Cotton Mills, formerly known as Yusafzai Industries Limited, from the Hoti family.

In 1981, Bibojee incorporated Ghandhara Nissan Limited for distribution of completely built-up Nissan vehicles in Pakistan. The General Tyre and Rubber Company was listed on the Karachi Stock Exchange in 1982. By that year, The Christian Science Monitor reported Habibullah controlled approximately 32 companies under Bibojee Services, with interests spanning textiles, chemicals, sugar, fertiliser, and cement, alongside assets in Saudi Arabia, Sudan, and Bangladesh. In January 1992, under the privatisation scheme of Nawaz Sharif's government, Bibojee Services re-acquired National Motors Limited for PKR 150.44 million (approximately US$ 24.50 million) and the company resumed its original name of Ghandhara Industries Limited in 1999. The same year, both Ghandhara Nissan and Bannu Woollen Mills were converted into publicly listed companies.

After Habibullah's death in December 1994, his son Ahmad Kuli Khan Khattak succeeded him as chief executive of Ghandhara Industries; control of the group was assumed by his children, including retired Lieutenant General Ali Kuli Khan Khattak. In the 2000s, Bibojee entered into a technical collaboration with Russia's KAMAZ to assemble heavy trucks and prime movers at the group's plant in SITE Town, Karachi. In March 2018, Ghandhara Nissan signed a manufacturing and licensing agreement with Nissan Motor Co. to begin local production of Datsun models, an arrangement subsequently suspended.

In October 2020, Janana De Malucho Textile Mills acquired the remaining stake in Babri Cotton Mills for approximately PKR 230 million in a stock-swap transaction; the merger was completed in March 2021 and Babri Cotton Mills was delisted from the Pakistan Stock Exchange in March 2022.

In February 2021, Ghandhara Nissan announced it would assemble Chery Tiggo vehicles in Pakistan. In August 2021, The General Tyre and Rubber Company of Pakistan was renamed as Ghandhara Tyre and Rubber Company Limited (GTR).

== Subsidiaries ==
=== Current ===
- Bannu Woollen Mills Limited, established in 1953 by the Pakistan Industrial Development Corporation and divested in 1963 to Bibojee Group
- Gammon Pakistan Limited
- Ghandhara Automobiles Limited
- Ghandhara Industries Limited
- Ghandhara Tyre
- Janana De Malucho Textile Mills Limited
- Rahman Cotton Mills
- The Universal Insurance Company

=== Former ===
- Babri Cotton Mills Limited
- Ghandhara Diesels Limited

== Management ==
- Habibullah Khan Khattak
- Ali Kuli Khan Khattak
- Gohar Ayub Khan
