= Javed Ilyas =

Pakistani cricketer (born 1955)

Personal information
- Full name: Javed Ilyas
- Born: 25 August 1955 (age 71); Multan, Punjab, Pakistan
- Batting: Right-handed
- Bowling: Right-arm off break
- Role: All-rounder
- Relatives: Inzamam-ul-Haq (nephew)

Domestic team information
- Years: Team
- 1971/72–1985/86: Multan
- 1975/76–1976/77: Punjab

Career statistics
Competition	First-class	List A
Matches	28	2
Runs scored	1,232	10
Batting average	26.21	5.00
100s/50s	1/6	0/0
Top score	102*	7
Balls bowled	2,264	24
Wickets	23	0
Bowling average	50.73	–
5 wickets in innings	0	0
10 wickets in match	0	0
Best bowling	4/95	–
Catches/stumpings	29/–	0/–
- Source: Cricinfo, 1 May 2026

Javed Ilyas (born 25 August 1955) is a Pakistani former cricketer. Ilyas was a right-handed batsman who bowled right-arm off break. He was born in Multan, Punjab, and played domestic cricket in Pakistan for Multan and Punjab.

Born into a landowning family in Multan, Ilyas was educated at Cantonment Board High School, Government College, Sahiwal, and Government College, Bosan Road, Multan. He made his first-class debut for Multan in the 1971–72 Patron's Trophy, and later represented Pakistan Under-19s against the touring Sri Lankan youth side and on a youth tour of England in 1974. By the 1975–76 season, he had been appointed captain of Multan.

Ilyas's most notable first-class innings came in the 1977–78 Patron's Trophy, when he scored his only century, an unbeaten 102 against Income Tax Department at the Multan Cricket Club Ground. In that innings, he shared an opening partnership of 238 with Aftab Butt, who made 151. Earlier in his career, he had scored 72 against the same opposition while captaining Multan, and in the 1974–75 Patron's Trophy he made 69 against Bahawalpur.

His best all-round first-class performance came against Karachi Greens in the 1983–84 Patron's Trophy at Zafar Ali Stadium, Sahiwal. Ilyas took career-best figures of 4 for 95 in the first innings and then top-scored with 92 in Multan's reply. Overall, he played in 28 first-class matches, scoring 1,232 runs at a batting average of 26.21, with one century and six half-centuries, while taking 23 wickets at a bowling average of 50.73. He also played two List A matches for Punjab.

After his playing career, Ilyas remained an influential figure in Multan cricket and helped nurture younger players in the region, including his nephew Inzamam-ul-Haq.
