= One Town, One Product (Philippines) =

Government development program

Logo for the One Town One Product Program

One Town, One Product (OTOP) is a promotional program of the government of the Philippines. The initiative follows a similar undertaking by the Republic of China, which launched a One Town One Product in 1989 to promote companies in Taiwan. OTOP in the Philippines aims to promote goods and products of Filipino towns, cities, and regions, and provides funding for small businesses. It is administered by the Department of Budget and Management (DBM).

== History ==
OTOP was proposed by President Gloria Macapagal Arroyo as early as 2002 and launched in 2004. It was scheduled to end in 2010. DBM dropped OTOP funding in spring 2011; however, President Benigno 'Noynoy" Aquino has authorized its continuation.

OTOP is a priority stimulus program for Micro and Small and Medium-scale enterprises (MSMEs) as government's customized intervention to drive inclusive local economic growth. It enables localities and communities to determine, develop, support and promote culturally-rooted products or services where they can be the best at or best renowned for.

OTOP Next Gen is DTI's program to further boost these products and services. Building from the gains of OTOP's first generation, the initiative offers a package of public-private assistance for MSMEs with minimum viable products to develop new and better offerings in areas including quality, product development, design, standards compliance, marketability, production capability, brand development.

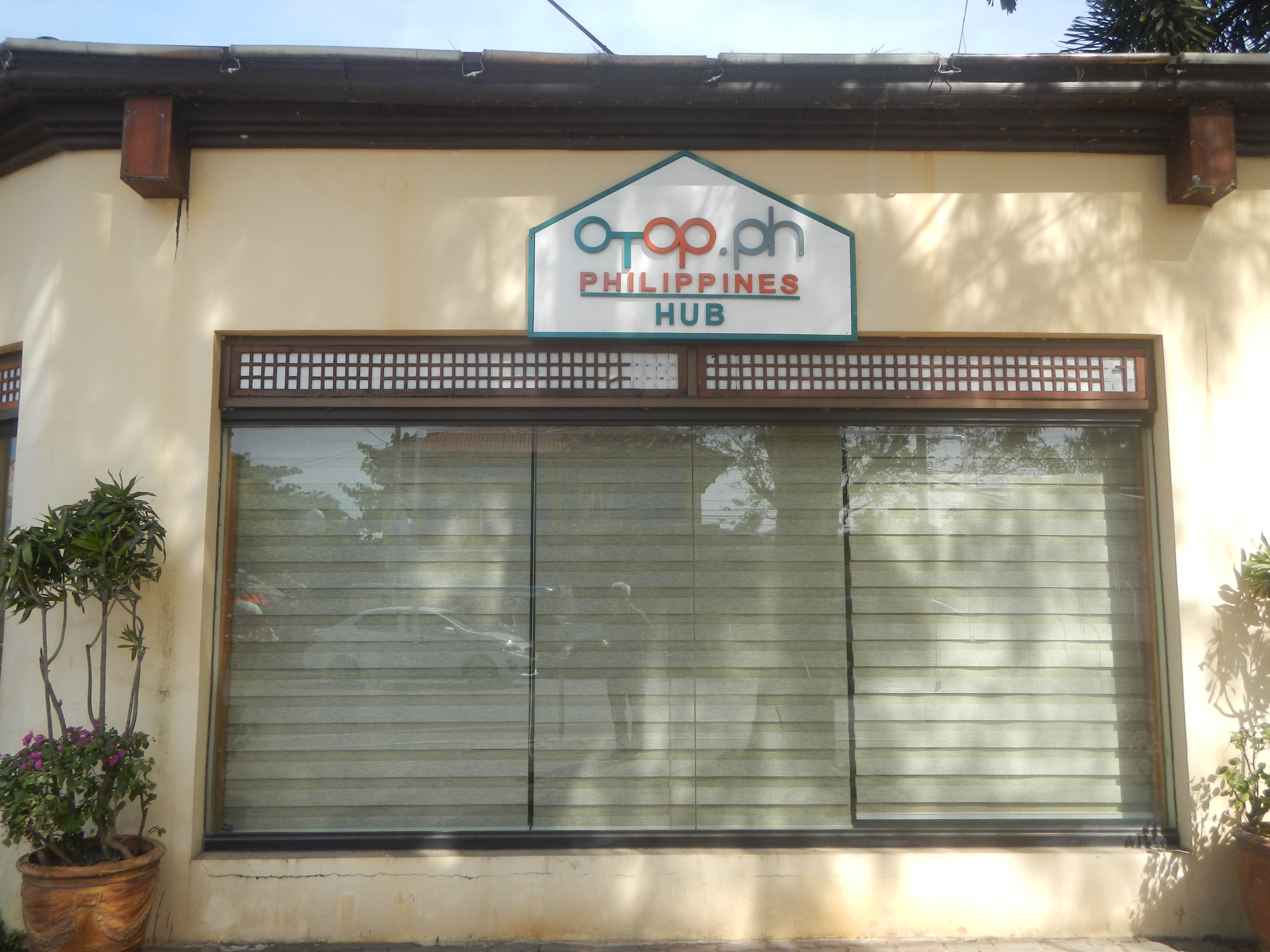
Binmaley

In keeping with DTI's mission and priorities, OTOP Next Gen also seeks to align support to DTI and PDP-identified priority industries. OTOP products shall still emphasize “Pride of Place” and cultural value, while focusing on marketability. OTOP products are significantly identified by their:

- Cultural value – heritage, local customs, living traditions (such as a vintage recipe passed on for generations)
- Abundant resources or skills – available raw materials and a pool of skills readily and locally deployable
- Competitive advantage – a locality's innate or endemic strength connected to factors such as topography, climate, or geographic location

MSMEs who engage in business within the value chain of OTOP products (primarily their manufacturers, but also raw material suppliers, processors, distributors, retailers, etc.) are called OTOPreneurs.

== Examples of OTOP products ==
One Town, One Product products vary, and can include fruits, specialty dishes, or handmade products. Examples of OTOP products include Arabica coffee in the Cordillera region; cacao products in San Isidro, Davao del Norte; brooms in Santa Fe, Nueva Vizcaya; and kalamay in Indang, Cavite.

== See also ==
- One Tambon One Product
- One Village One Product
- One Town One Product (Taiwan)
