= One Town One Product (Taiwan) =

Government development program

One Town One Product (OTOP) is a project begun in 1989 and supervised by the Small and Medium Enterprise Administration (SMEA) of the Taiwan's Ministry of Economic Affairs to promote products from Taiwan.

== History ==
In 1989, to promote local companies in Taiwan, the Small and Medium Enterprise Administration, an organization under the control of Taiwan Ministry of Economic Affairs, had adapted the concept of "One Village One Product" from Japan and formed an expert team to research local industries and distinctive products in Taiwan. This expert team was composed of specialists from design, financing, marketing working side by side with local companies to promote excellent products from Taiwan, especially ones that are blend of tradition and the unique art of Taiwan. OTOP at the present time has regroups more than 100 companies around Taiwan, Pescadores, and Matsu Islands.

Under the close supervision and help from Small and Medium Enterprises Administration, companies have transformed the natural simple resources into masterpieces of Taiwanese traditional art which is blended by the touch of Taiwanese artist. Today, with more than 1000 products have exhibited daily in OTOP centers around the island.

== Products ==
Under the supervision and encouragement from the Small and Medium Enterprise Administration, all the products of OTOP are handcrafts and have made from locally available material using wisdom and skill handed down from generation to generation.

The OTOP project has strong support from the Taiwanese government on different levels – identifying the potential OTOP product, advising on design and production, packaging and design that can attract both local and international markets.

== Challenges ==
With the support of Small and Medium Enterprise Administration, many selected products have exhibited in OTOP centers and many fairs organized by SMEA to promote these quality products into domestic and international markets. Many websites were set up to market Taiwanese town products.

== OTOP Shop ==
From last year and this year two OTOP shops were opened in Kaohsiung and in Taipei 101 to provide a greater access to international buyers and tourists varieties of traditional products developed under the OTOP – Taiwan Project.

== See also ==
- One Tambon One Product
- One Village One Product
- One Town, One Product (OTOP) - Philippines
