= Sher Ali Khan Pataudi =

Pakistan Army general (1913–2002)

Major General Sher Ali Khan Pataudi HJ
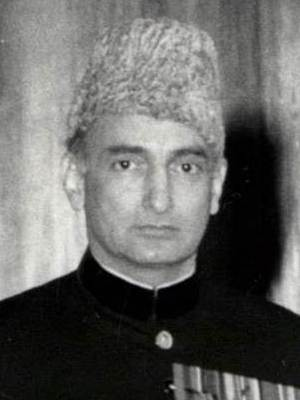
- Sher Ali Khan Pataudi, 1964
- Born: 13 May 1913; Pataudi, Punjab Province, British India (now in Haryana, India)
- Died: 29 May 2002 (aged 89); Lahore, Punjab, Pakistan
- Relatives: Pataudi family
- Military career
- Allegiance: British India (1933–1947; Pakistan (1947–1958)
- Branch: British Indian Army; Pakistan Army
- Service years: 1933–1958
- Rank: Major General
- Nickname: Sher
- Unit: Pakistan Army Light cavalry
- Commands: 1st Punjab Regiment; Pakistan Army 14 Brigade; Command and Staff College Chief of General Staff
- Conflicts: World War II; Indo-Pakistani War of 1947
- Awards: Hilal-i-Jur'at
- Other work: Ambassador and civil servant

Nawabzada Sher Ali Khan of Pataudi (Urdu: نوابزادہ شیر علی خان بڑیچ پٹوڈی) HJ (13 May 1913 – 29 May 2002) was a Pakistan Army general who served as Chief of the General Staff and later became a diplomat and politician. Born into the Pataudi family, he was the second son of Nawab Ibrahim Ali Khan, and his wife Shahar Bano Begum, daughter of Amiruddin Ahmad Khan, the Nawab of Loharu.

He was the author of several books and the recipient of the highest civil awards from governments in Malaysia, Yugoslavia and Indonesia, and was a Dato of the State of Pahang in Malaysia.

== Family and background ==
Sher Ali Khan Pataudi was the son of Ibrahim Ali Khan, the 7th Nawab of Pataudi from 1913 to 1917, and Shahar Bano Begum, daughter of Amiruddin Ahmad Khan, the Nawab of Loharu. Through his mother, he is related to the Urdu poet Mirza Ghalib, and the first Prime Minister of Pakistan, Nawabzada Liaquat Ali Khan. He was the brother of Iftikhar Ali Khan Pataudi (the 8th Nawab of Pataudi) and uncle of Mansoor Ali Khan Pataudi, the 9th Nawab of Pataudi and captain of Indian cricket team and granduncle of actors Saif Ali Khan and Soha Ali Khan.

Sher Ali Khan married Silvat Mueenuddin younger daughter of Mian Ghulam Mueenudin of Lahore, and had four sons and a daughter. He died 29 May 2002 at Sher Manzil in Lahore. One of his sons, Major General Isfandiyar Ali Khan Pataudi, was the commander of the Pakistan Army's 25th Mechanized Division and Deputy Director-General-Analysis (DG-A) of Pakistan's premier intelligence agency, the Inter-Services Intelligence.

== Military career ==
He was commissioned into the 7th Light Cavalry of the British Indian Army in 1933. He subsequently commanded the 1st battalion of the First Punjab Regiment during the Second World War.

After the war, he served as the Defence Attaché of the British Indian Armed Forces in Washington, D.C. Having chosen to move to Pakistan at independence, he commanded Pakistan's 14 (Parachute) Brigade during the 1947 Kashmir War in which action he was awarded the first Hilal-i-Jurat of Pakistan. He was appointed Adjutant General of the Pakistan Army and later served as the Chief of General Staff.

He was superseded along with Maj. Gen. Adam Khan and the former Commandant Command and Staff College Maj Gen M.A. Latif Khan when Maj Gen Muhammad Musa and Maj Gen Habibullah Khan Khattak were made C-in-C and COS respectively in October 1958.

== Diplomatic and political career ==
In 1958, on retirement from active service, he was appointed Pakistan's High Commissioner to Malaysia and in 1963 as Ambassador to Yugoslavia with concurrent accreditation to Bulgaria and Greece.

He served in the cabinet of General Yahya Khan as Federal Minister for Information, Broadcasting & and National Affairs 1969 – 71.

== Other work ==
=== Sports ===
He was a member of Pakistan's polo team for many years, captain of the All Malaysia Polo team for six years and President of the Malayan Polo Association 1959/1963. He also established the Djakarta riding/saddle club and was its first elected president.

=== Education ===
He taught briefly at Aitchison College and was also Vice Chairman of its Board of Governors. He was the co-founder and chairman of the governing body of Waqar-un-Nisa Women's College at Rawalpindi.

=== Ghori's mausoleum ===
He bought lands near Islamabad which later would host a mausoleum for Muhammad of Ghor, built by nuclear scientist Abdul Qadeer Khan in 1994-1995.

== Books ==
- Al-Qiṣaṣ: The Story of Soldiering and Politics in India and Pakistan, 1978 (third edition in 1988.)
- Quest of Identity: The Entanglement of Muslims in India and Pakistan, 1984 (second edition in 1994.)
- The Elite Minority: the Princes of India, 1989.
- Ramblings of a Tiger, 1990.

Military offices
Preceded by Major General Mian Hayaud Din	Chief of General Staff	Succeeded by Major General Habibullah Khan Khattak
