= Honda SL70 =

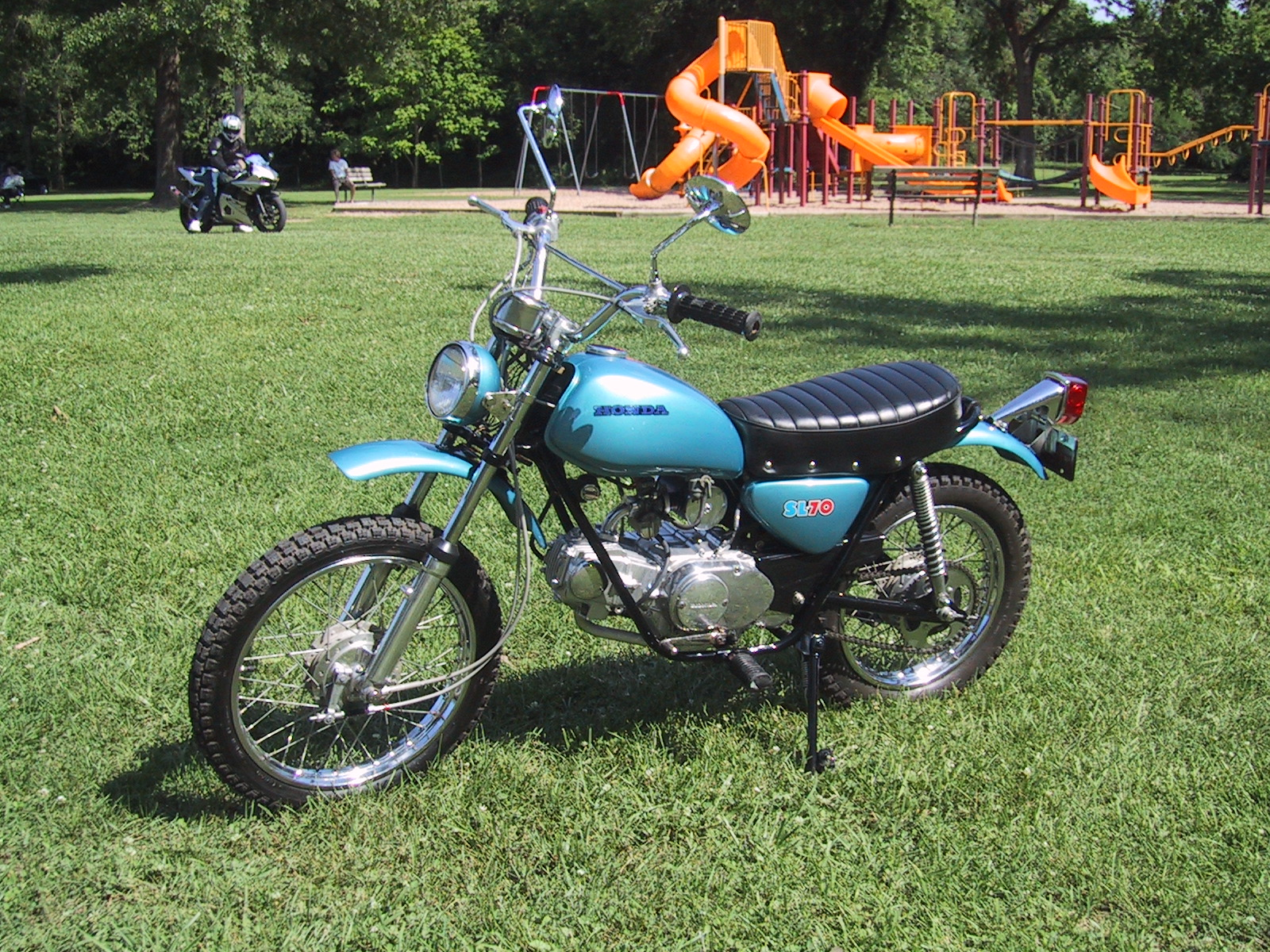
- Manufacturer: Honda Motor Company
- Production: 1970–1973
- Engine: 72 cc (4.4 cu in) 4-Stroke, OHC, air-cooled, single
- Power: 6.5 PS (4.8 kW) at 9,500 rpm
- Ignition type: Breaker points, 6 volts battery powered
- Transmission: 4-speed manual, chain final drive
- Brakes: Front: drum Rear: drum

The Honda SL70 Motosport, which was introduced in 1970, is a small street/trail motorcycle with a four-stroke engine, a four-speed manual gearbox, and a full-cradle frame. The bike was extremely popular with younger riders who used it off-road as a trail bike and mini motocrosser. For the latter role, it was essentially replaced by Honda's XR75 in 1973.

== Specifications ==
- Year of Production: 1970–1973
- Displacement: 72 cc (4.4 cu in)
- Engine: Four-stroke, aircooled, single overhead cam, single
- Ignition: Breaker points, 6 volts
- Power 6.5 PS (4.8 kW) @ 9,500 rpm
- Transmission:4 speed manual
- Fuel system: Carburetor
- Valves: 2 valves per cylinder

The vast majority of production of this model went to the American market. The bike was not officially sold in the UK.

In 1970, it was designated the SL70K0, 1971 the SL70K1, 1972 the SL70K2, and 1973 the SL70K3. Except for paint colors and the addition of a speedometer, the bike was unchanged in those four years. (When first introduced, its main competition in the marketplace was the Yamaha Mini Enduro 60.) In 1974, the designation changed to XL70 and the bike got a slimmer gas tank.

== See also ==
- Honda CL70
- Honda CD70
