= Ghandhara Automobiles Limited =

Pakistani automobile manufacturer

Ghandhara Automobiles
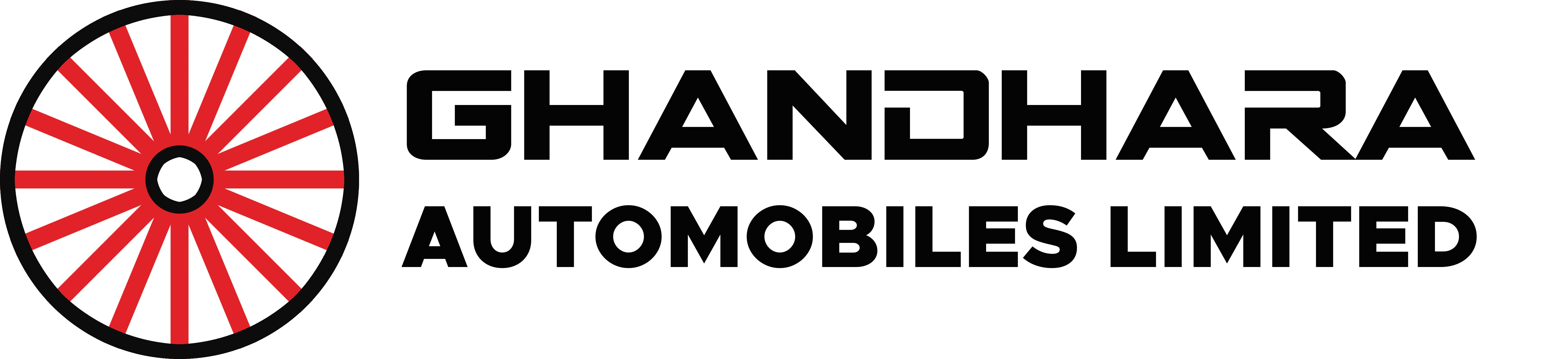
- Type: Public
- Traded as: PSX: GAL
- Industry: Automotive
- Founded: 1981
- Headquarters: Karachi, Sindh, Pakistan
- Area served: Pakistan
- Key people: Ahmed Kuli Khan Khattak (CEO)
- Products: Dongfeng, JAC, Renault Trucks
- Revenue: ▲ Rs. 13.104 billion (US$47 million) (2023)
- Operating income: ▲ Rs. 782.723 million (US$2.8 million) (2023)
- Net income: ▼ Rs. 181.270 million (US$650,000) (2023)
- Total assets: ▼ Rs. 12.622 billion (US$45 million) (2023)
- Total equity: ▲ Rs. 7.921 billion (US$28 million) (2023)
- Owner: Bibojee Services (57.75%)
- Number of employees: 1,060 (2023)
- Parent: Bibojee Group
- Subsidiaries: Ghandhara Industries Limited (19.09%)
- Website: ghandharaautomobiles.com.pk
- Footnotes; Financials as of 30 June 2023

Ghandhara Automobiles Limited (Urdu: گندھارا اٹوموبیلز محدود) formerly known as Ghandhara Nissan, is a Pakistani automobile manufacturer based in Karachi.

It was established in 1981. Ghandhara Automobiles is the authorized assembler and manufacturer of Chery, Dongfeng, JAC and Renault Trucks vehicles in Pakistan.

== History ==
Ghandhara Nissan (Ghandhara Automobiles) was incorporated in 1981 for the distribution of completely built-up (CBU) Nissan vehicles in Pakistan. In 1992, it became a publicly listed company on the Karachi Stock Exchange. Ghandhara Nissan has a technical assistance agreement with Nissan Motors and a joint venture agreement with Nissan Diesel for the progressive assembly of passenger vehicles, light commercial vehicles and heavy duty vehicles. Ghandhara Nissan's manufacturing and assembly plant which has a capacity of 6,000 cars per year, is located at Port Qasim, Karachi.

Ghandhara Nissan forms one of several companies of Bibojee Group. In 2016, Renault announced to start assembling cars in Pakistan by 2018 in collaboration with Ghandhara Nissan, and collaborated with new partner Al-Futtaim Group of United Arab Emirates (UAE) but shelved the project later on.

In March 2018, Nissan signed a manufacturing and licensing agreement with Ghandhara Nissan to begin local production of Datsun models but suspended talks later.

In February 2021, Ghandhara Nissan announced it would assemble Chery Tiggo vehicles in Pakistan.

On April 18, 2023, Ghandhara Nissan Limited changed its name to Ghandhara Automobiles Limited.

== Products ==
=== Commercial Vehicles ===
==== Dongfeng Trucks ====
- Dongfeng DF220 (6x2)
- Dongfeng DF245 (6x2)
- Dongfeng DF245i (4x2)
- Dongfeng DF280 (6x4)
- Dongfeng DF285i (6x4)
- Dongfeng DF375 (6x4)/(8x4)
- Dongfeng DF385/420 (6x4)
- Realing M
- Captain C

==== Renault Trucks ====
- D-280 (Medium Truck)
- C-380 (Medium-Heavy Truck)
- K-380 (Heavy Truck)

==== JAC Motors ====
- X200 (Light-Medium Truck)
- 1020K (Medium Truck)
- 1042K (Medium Truck)

== Marketing and Branding ==
In 2025, Ghandhara Automobiles Limited, through its JAC Motors Pakistan division, appointed Pakistani rally and drift driver Dina Rohinton Patel as a brand ambassador in their motorsport programme, where she has been featured driving the JAC T9 Hunter in official promotional materials and events.

== See also ==
- Ghandhara Industries
