= Ghandhara Tyre =

Pakistani manufacturing company

Ghandhara Tyre & Rubber
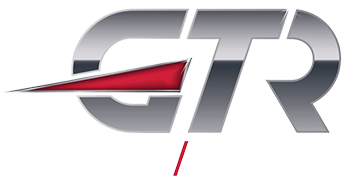
- Type: Public
- Traded as: PSX: GTYR
- Industry: Automotive
- Founded: 1963; 63 years ago in Karachi, Pakistan
- Headquarters: Landhi, Karachi, Pakistan
- Key people: Hussain Kuli Khan (CEO); Ali Kuli Khan Khattak (chairman)
- Products: Tyres
- Revenue: ▼ Rs. 15.01 billion (US$54 million) (2023)
- Operating income: ▼ Rs. -193.61 million (US$−690,000) (2023)
- Net income: ▼ Rs. -167.36 million (US$−600,000) (2023)
- Total assets: ▲ Rs. 18.27 billion (US$65 million) (2023)
- Total equity: ▲ Rs. 5.75 billion (US$21 million) (2023)
- Owner: Pakistan Kuwait Investment Company Pvt. Ltd (30%); Bibojee Services (Private) Limited (27.79%)
- Number of employees: 1,078 (2023)
- Website: gtr.com.pk

Ghandhara Tyre & Rubber Company Limited (GTR), formerly known as The General Tyre and Rubber Company of Pakistan Limited is a Pakistani tyre manufacturing company based in Karachi, Sindh. It has a production capacity of two million tyres per annum with manufacturing plant located in Landhi.

== History ==
Ghandhara Tyre & Rubber Company Limited was founded in 1963 as General Tyre & Rubber Company by General Tire International Corporation (GTIC) to build a plant at a cost of US$4 million. A plant was built in Landhi, Karachi on a 25-acre plot which commenced its production in 1964 with a total capacity of 120,000 tyres per annum.

GTIC sold 90 percent of its shares to the present owners, M/s Bibojee Services Ltd., in 1977 and retained 10 percent ownership. In 1982, the company was listed on the Karachi Stock Exchange. In 1985, the company completed a major expansion, increasing its capacity to 600,000 tyres annually.

In 1987, Continental AG acquired the General Tire International Corporation which made it 10% owner in General Tyre Pakistan.

In 2021, it was renamed as GTR. In April 2021, GTR began manufacturing tyres for sports utility vehicle.
