= Lahore International Expo Centre =

Convention centre in Lahore, Punjab, Pakistan

Expo Centre Lahore نُمَائِش گاہ لاہور

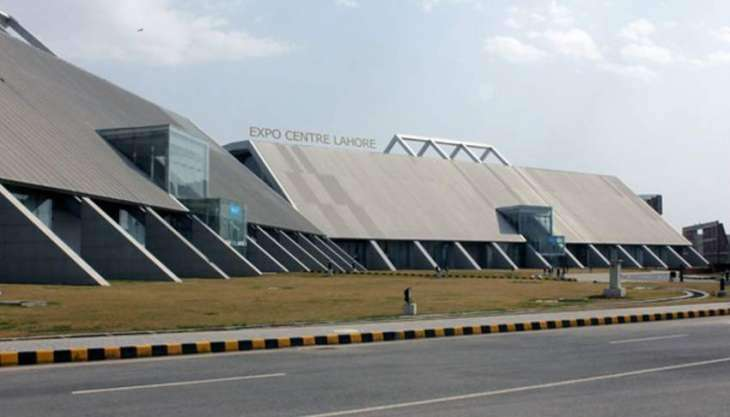
- Interactive map of Expo Centre Lahore نُمَائِش گاہ لاہور
- Location: Abdul Haque Road; Johar Town, Lahore; Punjab, Pakistan. 54782
- Coordinates: 31.464°N 74.259°E
- Owner: Pakistan Expo Centres Limited
- Type: Convention Centre
- Events: Exhibitions, Conferences

Construction
- Built: 2010

Website
- http://www.pakexcel.com

Expo Centre Lahore (Urdu: نُمَائِش گاہ لاہور) is a 4,000-square-metre (43,000 sq ft) convention center located in Lahore, Punjab, Pakistan. Designed by joint venture of National Engineering Services Pakistan (NESPAK) and Nayyar Ali Dada & Associates, the convention center is located in Johar Town at the corner of Abdul Haque Road and Shahrah Nazaria-e-Pakistan. Construction began in 2007 and was completed in 2010.

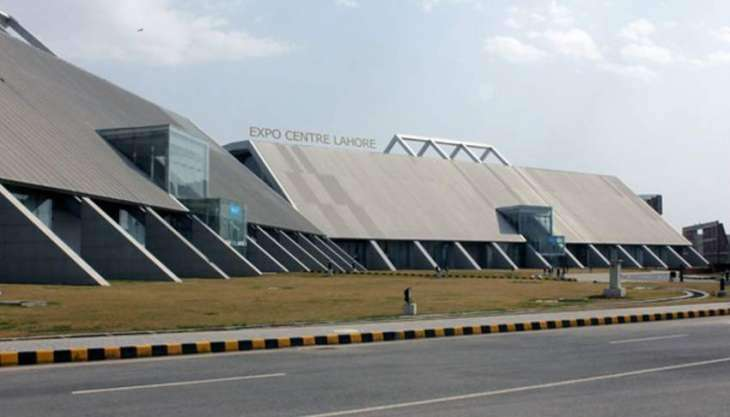
Lahore Expo Centre

== History ==
A memorandum of understanding (MoU) was signed by the Government of Punjab and the federal government on 30 March 2002 for this purpose. The centre was established jointly by the provincial and federal governments of Pakistan at a 400-kanal land plot provided by the Lahore Development Authority on a 40-years lease in 2004. The intent was to provide local exporters a central location for displaying their products and providing product information to foreign trade delegations and buyers under one roof.

== Venues ==
The Expo Centre is divided into several sections:

- Exhibition Halls
  - Hall 01
  - Hall 02
  - Hall 03
- Convention Hall
  - Auditorium 01
  - Auditorium 02
  - Foyer
  - Summit Room
  - Meeting Rooms
- General Hall
  - Hall A
  - Hall B
- Open Event Area

== Pakistan leather show ==
In 2017, 'The 3rd Pakistan Mega Leather Show 2017' was held at the Expo Centre. The event was aimed at giving a boost to the Pakistani leather industry and providing buyers and sellers an environment to explore business opportunities. Trade Development Authority of Pakistan (TDAP) Chief Executive S. M. Munir addressed the opening ceremony of the show and stated, "Pakistani exporters have great potential and capability to compete in the international markets."

== Lahore international book fair ==
In February 2019, 'The 33rd Lahore International Book Fair' was held at the Expo Centre with 270 stalls showcasing books on medical, poetry, engineering, science, art, culture, novels, biographies, travelogues, textbooks, history, social sciences, geography, religion and many other topics.

== Temporary use in emergency ==
In 2020, during the COVID-19 pandemic crisis, a temporary field hospital was set up at the Expo Centre to deal with the emergency overflow of patients that could not be accommodated at the many hospitals in and around the city of Lahore.

== See also ==
- Karachi Expo Centre
- Hyderabad Expo Center
