= Atlas Honda =

Pakistani motorcycle manufacturer

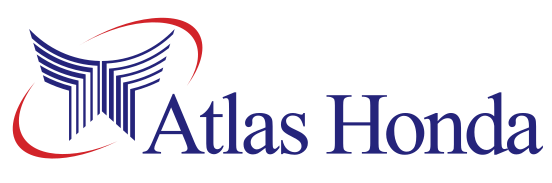
- Formerly: Atlas Autos Limited (1962–1991)
- Type: Public
- Traded as: PSX: ATLH; KSE 100 component
- Industry: Automotive
- Founded: 1962; 64 years ago
- Headquarters: Karachi, Pakistan
- Key people: Saquib H. Shirazi (CEO)
- Products: Motorcycles
- Revenue: ▲ Rs. 273.9 billion (US$980 million) (2026)
- Operating income: ▲ Rs. 34.6 billion (US$120 million) (2026)
- Net income: ▲ Rs. 21.1 billion (US$75 million) (2026)
- Total assets: ▲ Rs. 105.5 billion (US$380 million) (2026)
- Total equity: ▲ Rs. 36.36 billion (US$130 million) (2026)
- Owner: Atlas Group (55%); Honda (35%)
- Number of employees: 2,718 (2024)
- Parent: Atlas Group; Honda
- Website: atlashonda.com.pk
- Footnotes; Financials as of 30 April 2026

Atlas Honda Limited, formerly known as Atlas Autos, is a Pakistani motorcycle manufacturer based in Karachi. As of 2017, it is the largest motorcycle maker in Pakistan. Founded in 1962 through a technical collaboration with Honda Motor Company of Japan, it is the largest motorcycle manufacturer in Pakistan by production capacity and market share. The company is a joint venture between Atlas Group (Pakistan) and Honda Motor Company (Japan).

== History ==
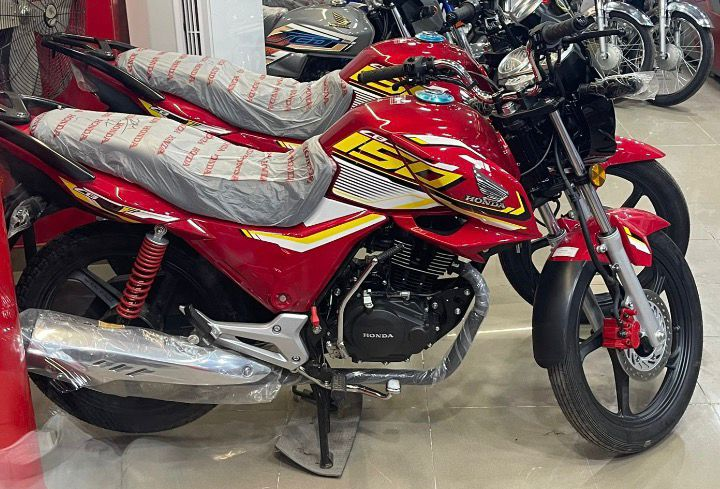
Honda CB150F 2025

Atlas Honda was founded as Atlas Autos Limited following a technical collaboration agreement with Honda Motor Company in 1963, focusing on motorcycle production and sales in Pakistan. The first manufacturing facility was established in Karachi. Later, Honda Atlas also established a manufacturing plant in East Pakistan called Atlas Epak Limited but it was lost after the independence of Bangladesh.

In 1976, Honda Atlas launched CD-70 and CG-125 in Pakistan. Three years later, in 1979, Honda Atlas established a second motorcycle manufacturing plant in Sheikhupura, named Panjdarya Limited.

In 1988, a joint venture agreement with Honda was signed in 1988. Both Atlas Autos Limited and Panjdarya Limited operated were merged in 1991, and the consolidated entity began operating as Atlas Honda Limited.

== Production ==
The company also manufactures various hi-tech components in-house in collaboration with leading parts manufacturers such as Showa Atsumitech, Nippon Denso and Toyo Denso. The company also exports motorcycles to Sri Lanka, Afghanistan and Bangladesh. Atlas Honda has Pakistan's largest in-house manufacturing capability, which include an R&D wing and tool making facilities through CAD/CAM.

In March 2026, the Board of Directors approved a capital expenditure of Rs 5.3 billion (approximately USD 20 million) for the expansion of its motorcycle operations, aimed at enhancing capacity, automation, and productivity. Following this expansion, the company's rated annual production capacity is expected to increase to 2 million units.

== Exports ==
Atlas Honda exports motorcycles to regional markets including Sri Lanka, Afghanistan, and Bangladesh, as part of its South Asian expansion strategy, with additional outreach to emerging markets in Central Asia and Africa.

== Products ==
- Honda CD 70
- Honda CD70 Dream
- Honda Pridor
- Honda CG125
- Honda CG125S
- Honda CG125S Gold
- Honda CB125F
- Honda CG150
- Honda CB150F
- Honda ICON e

Atlas Honda introduced two new two-wheelers in Pakistan, the CG150 motorcycle and the Icon e electric scooter. The CG150 uses a 4-stroke SOHC engine, while the Icon e is compliant with the National Electric Vehicle Policy. The releases mark the company's expansion into both conventional bikes and electric two-wheelers.

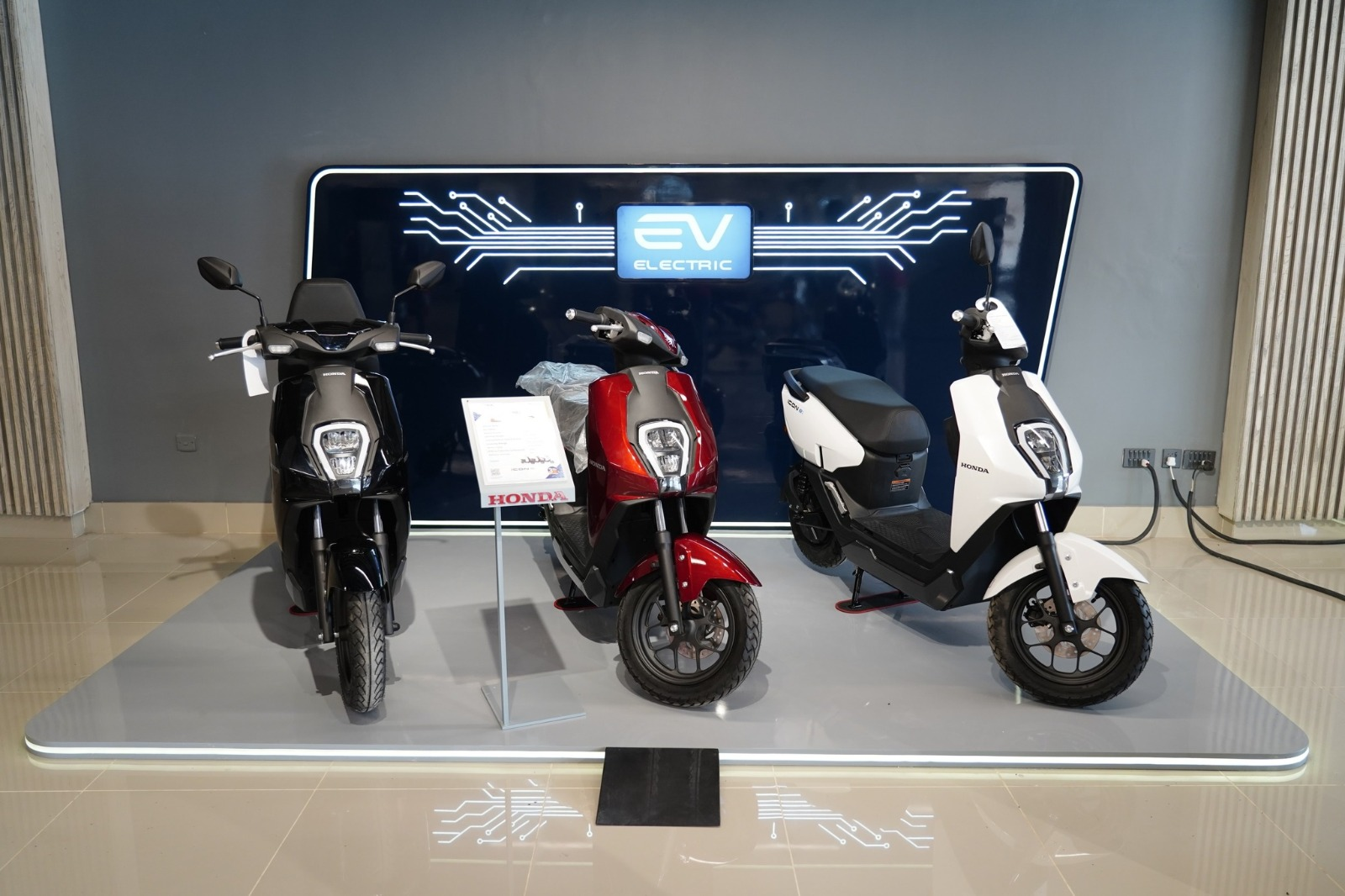
Honda Icon e: 2025

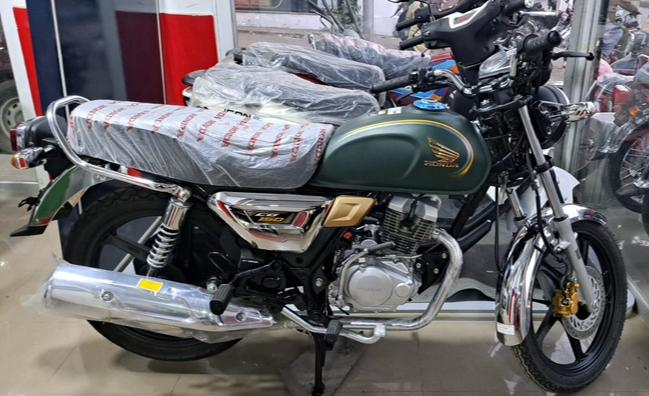
Honda CG150 2025

== See also ==
- List of motorcycle manufacturers
- List of Honda motorcycles
