= Honda CL70 =

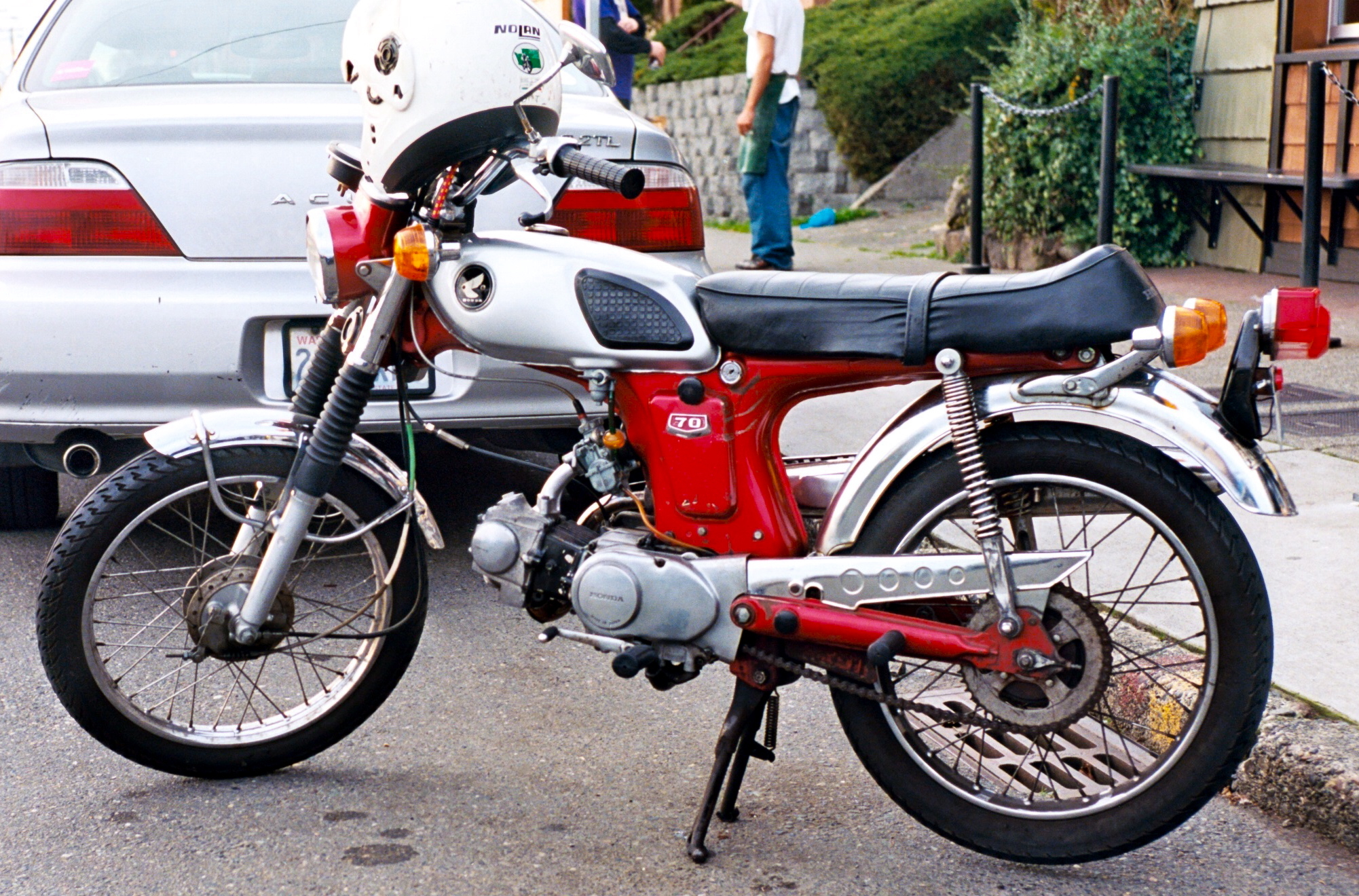
- 1969 Honda CL70
- Manufacturer: Honda Motor Company
- Also called: Honda CL50 (Benly)
- Production: 1967–1971 (CL50); 1969–1973 (CL50); 1997–2001 (CL50 Benly)
- Predecessor: Honda CL90
- Engine: 72 cc (4.4 cu in) 4-Stroke, OHC, air-cooled, single
- Ignition type: Breaker points, 6 volts battery powered
- Transmission: 4-speed manual, chain final drive
- Frame type: Pressed steel
- Brakes: Front: drum Rear: drum

The Honda CL70 Scrambler was a small motorcycle with a 72 cc four-stroke engine, a four-speed manual gearbox and a pressed steel frame. It was built by Honda between 1969 and 1973. It essentially replaced the Honda CL90. It was a larger-engined version of the CL50, which had been introduced two years earlier. As a scrambler, it had a high-mount exhaust and a high rear fender. This allowed the look, though not really the capability, of extended off-road capability, before real dual-sport motorcycles were available.

The CL50 was reintroduced in April 1997, thirty years after the original version. Now called the CL50 Benly it was part of a wave of retro-style moped for the Japanese market; it was based on the CD50 Benly and used that bike's CD50E engine. The 49 cc single-cylinder, two-valve SOHC four-stroke engine produces 4.0 PS (2.9 kW) at 7,000 rpm and it weighed 74 kg (163 lb). It was discontinued again in 2001.

Honda CL70

== See also ==
- Honda SL70
- Honda CD70
