= Honda CB125 =

CB125
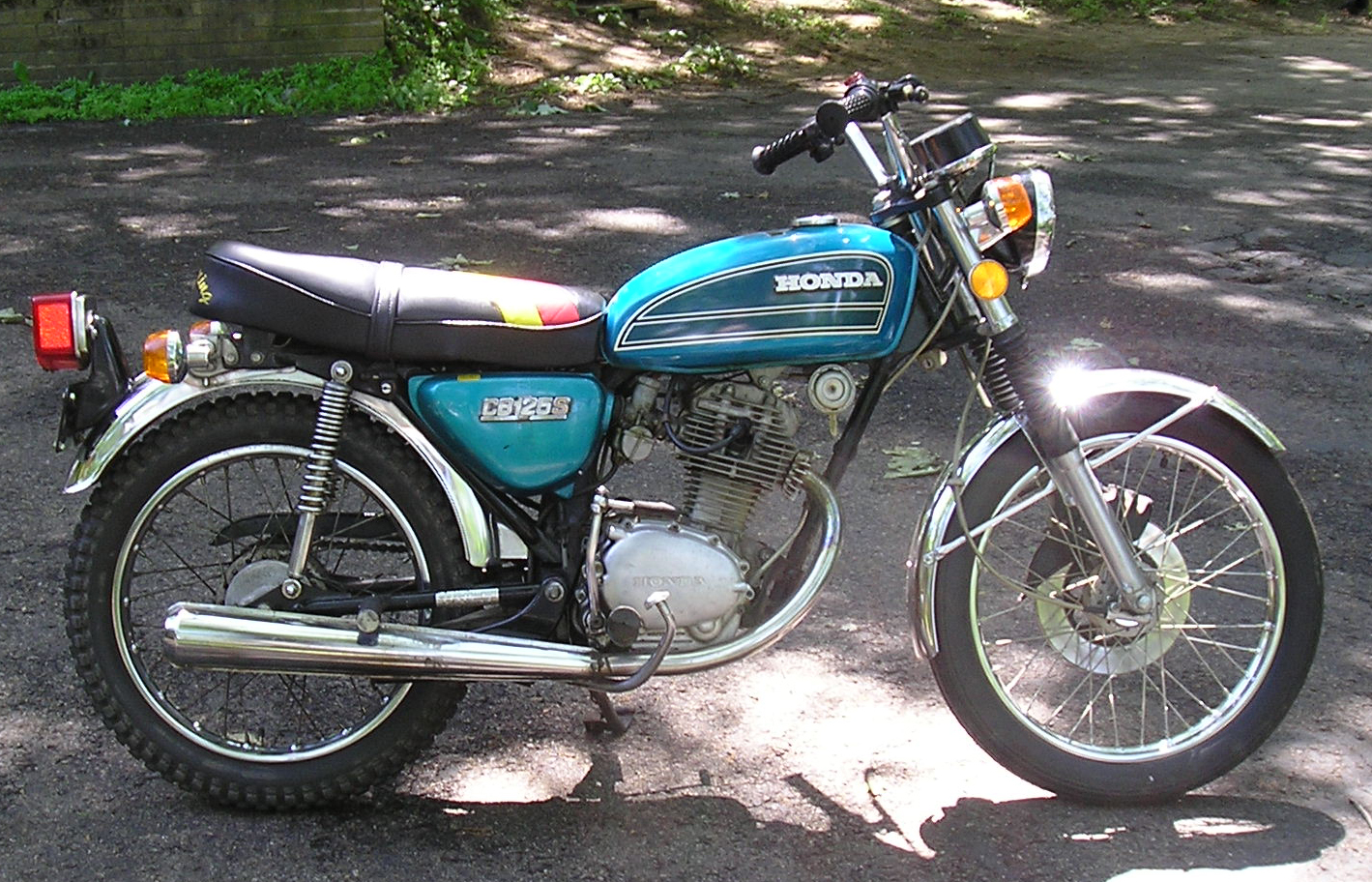
- 1975 Honda CB125S
- Manufacturer: Honda
- Production: 1971–1985
- Successor: Honda CG125
- Engine: 122–124 cc (7.4–7.6 cu in) air-cooled 4-stroke OHC 2-valve single-engine, wet sump
- Bore / stroke: 56 by 50 millimetres (2.21 in × 1.95 in) 1973–1975
- Ignition type: Kick start Capacitive discharge from 1980 onwards
- Transmission: 5-speed manual, chain drive
- Brakes: Drum
- Fuel capacity: 8.7 L; 1.9 imp gal (2.3 US gal)

The Honda CB125 is a 122 cc (7.4 cu in) motorcycle made by Honda from 1971 to 1985 (1973–1985 in the US). It had a single-cylinder overhead camshaft (OHC) engine with a 9500 rpm redline. The "S" model was produced from 1971 to 1975 and was replaced in 1976 by the "J" model (the US bikes retained the S designation). The newer model sported a two-piece head, 124 cc (7.6 cu in) displacement, and a larger carburettor.

== Major changes ==
Aside from different color schemes and minor lettering differences, these are some of the major design changes:

- 1973 - First year the bike was released in the US as CB125S0. UK model CB125S with tachometer and exhaust with trumpet end.
- 1974 - Front drum brake changed to disk, tachometer was added.
- 1976 - Engine displacement increased from 122 to 124 cc (7.4 to 7.6 cu in), tachometer was eliminated.
- 1979 - Front disc brake was changed back to drum.
- 1980 - Point ignition was changed to capacitive discharge.
- 1983 - The bike was produced but not released for customers this year.
- 1984 - The electrical system was changed from 6 to 12 volts.
- 1985 - The last year the bike was released in the US, the headlight shape was changed from round to rectangular.

== US model year changes ==
Identifications, specifications, and changes throughout the years. This chart is for units sold In America only.

	Ignition	Displacement	Front brake	Rear brake	Instruments	Notes
1973	Breaker points	122 cc	Drum	Drum	Speedometer (only)	6v electrical system (73–83)
1974	Breaker points	122 cc	Mechanical disc	Drum	Speedometer and Tachometer	
1975	Breaker points	122 cc	Mechanical disc	Drum	Speedometer and Tachometer	
1976	Breaker points	124 cc	Mechanical disc	Drum	Speedometer (only)	
1977						
1978	Breaker points	124 cc	Mechanical disc	Drum	Speedometer (only)	
1979	Breaker points	124 cc	Single leading shoe Front brake	Drum	Speedometer (only)	
1980	Breaker points	124 cc	Single leading shoe Front brake	Drum	Speedometer (only)	
1981	Capacitive Discharge	124 cc	Single leading shoe Front brake	Drum	Speedometer (only)	
1982	Capacitive Discharge	124 cc	Single leading shoe Front brake	Drum	Speedometer (only)	
1983	Not produced					
1984	Capacitive Discharge	124 cc	Single leading shoe Front brake	Drum	Speedometer (only)	12v Electrical system (84–85)
1985	Capacitive discharge	124 cc	Single leading shoe Front brake	Drum	Speedometer (only)	Rectangular headlight

This table explains the specific changes year to year.

The components of the CB125 did not change much throughout the years unlike the appearance of the CB125. The majority of the changes made upon the bike was the color of the fuel tank, and the color of the decals. The color and decals changed every year the CB125 was produced.
