= Pakistan Gems and Jewellery Development Company =

Pakistani state-owned gems and jewellery development company

- Native name: پاکستان کمپنی برائے ترقیِ جواہرات و گوہر
- Type: State-owned, non-profit public–private partnership
- Industry: Gemstones; Jewellery; Industrial development
- Founded: 26 June 2006; 20 years ago in Karachi, Pakistan
- Headquarters: Karachi, Pakistan
- Area served: Pakistan
- Key people: Toufeeque Ahmed Arain (CEO)
- Owner: Pakistan Industrial Development Corporation
- Parent: Ministry of Industries and Production
- Website: pgjdc.org

Pakistan Gems and Jewellery Development Company (PGJDC) is a Pakistani state-owned, non-profit company set up to develop the country's gemstone and jewellery industry "from mine to market", through skill development, technology upgrading, gemstone identification and certification, assaying and hallmarking, and branding initiatives. A subsidiary of the Pakistan Industrial Development Corporation under the Ministry of Industries and Production, it is headquartered in Karachi.

== History ==
The origins of PGJDC lie in the Pakistan Initiative for Strategic Development and Competitiveness (PISDAC), a programme funded by the United States Agency for International Development (USAID). Under PISDAC, a Strategy Working Group was convened with industry stakeholders, the Small and Medium Enterprise Development Authority (SMEDA) and the Government of Pakistan to design a "mine-to-market" strategy for the gems and jewellery sector. Following its recommendations, PGJDC was incorporated as a non-profit public–private entity on 26 June 2006 under section 42 of the Companies Ordinance 1984, and became operational in April 2007.

In its early years, the company received development and operational funding from the federal government, including allocations of around Rs1.4 billion for developmental projects and Rs150 million for operating expenses, which it used to begin work on value-chain analysis, gap identification and a mine-to-market strategy.

In October 2007, PGJDC announced plans for a 4.4 ha (10.8 acres) gems and jewellery manufacturing complex inside the Korangi Creek Industrial Park in Karachi, intended to combine processing units, training centres, gem laboratories and jewellery manufacturing in a single, dedicated zone.

In January 2011, PGJDC organised the first "Gem Bazaar" exhibition in Islamabad, inaugurated by the Federal Minister for Industries and Production Hazar Khan Bijarani. In June 2012, the company organised the four-day Pakistan International Gems & Jewellery Exhibition (PIGJE 2012) at the Pearl Continental Hotel in Karachi, which drew foreign delegations from India, the United Arab Emirates, the United Kingdom, Sri Lanka, the United States, Hong Kong and France.

In November 2021, the Federal Cabinet directed that PGJDC be upgraded into a statutory body to be known as the Pakistan Gems and Jewellery Development Authority (PGJDA), with a broader mandate covering development, regulation and standardisation of the sector. PGJDC's upgrade into an authority was never completed.

== Operations ==
PGJDC has set up a network of Gems and Jewellery Training and Manufacturing Centres (GJTMCs) and supporting facilities in Karachi, Lahore, Peshawar, Quetta, Gilgit, Muzaffarabad and Sargodha, offering courses in gemmology, gemstone cutting, faceting and identification, jewellery design and manufacturing, and computer-aided design. The company also operates Gemstone Identification Laboratories at several of these centres for grading and certification of diamonds and other precious and semi-precious stones, and has set up assaying and hallmarking centres in Karachi and Lahore to test the precious-metal content of jewellery articles.

To bring buyers and sellers together, PGJDC runs periodic "Gem Bazaars" in cities such as Peshawar, Quetta, Gilgit and Islamabad, and has established permanent Gem Exchanges in Peshawar's Namak Mandi area and in Quetta.

PGJDC also provides training to women in Balochistan, offering courses in jewellery design, gemmology, gemstone processing, faceting and computer-aided jewellery design at its Quetta training centre.
