= Honda CD70 =

Model of Honda motorcycle

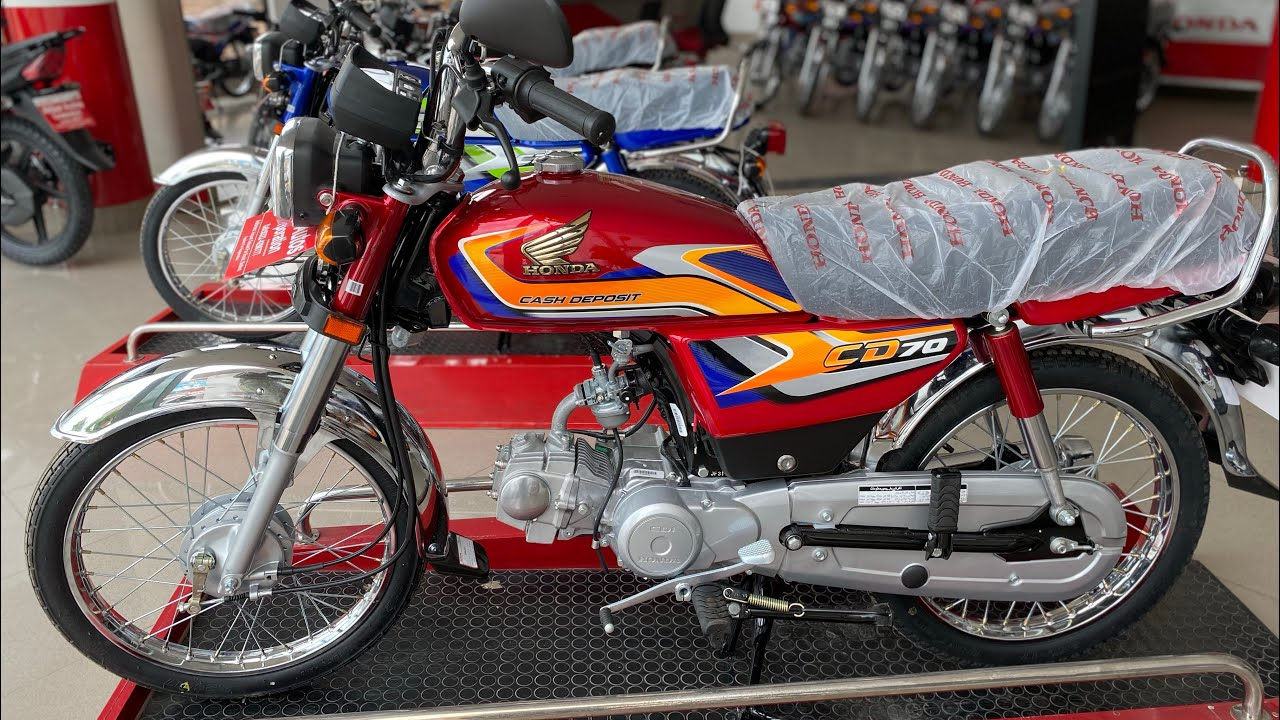
- Honda CD70
- Manufacturer: Atlas Honda, Pakistan
- Also called: CD 70 Benly
- Parent company: Honda Motor Company
- Production: 1970–present
- Assembly: Japan (1970–1991); Karachi, Pakistan (1991–present); Sheikhupura, Pakistan (1991–present)
- Class: Standard
- Engine: 72 cc (4.4 cu in) 4-Stroke, OHC, air-cooled, single
- Bore / stroke: 47.0 mm (1.85 in) × 41.4 mm (1.63 in)
- Compression ratio: 9.3:1
- Top speed: 75 to 85 km/h (47 to 53 mph)
- Power: 6.41 HP (6.5 PS) at 9500 rpm
- Torque: 0.53kg at 8000 rpm
- Ignition type: Capacitor discharge ignition CDI
- Transmission: Four-speed manual
- Brakes: Drum, front and rear
- Tires: Front: 2.25-17 (4 PR); Rear: 2.50-17 (4 PR)
- Wheelbase: 1,206 mm (47.5 in)
- Dimensions: L: 1,897 mm (74.7 in); W: 751 mm (29.6 in); H: 1,014 mm (39.9 in)
- Weight: 82 kg (181 lb) (dry)
- Fuel capacity: 8.5 L (1.9 imp gal; 2.2 US gal) (Reserve: 1 L (0.22 imp gal; 0.26 US gal))
- Fuel consumption: 70 km/L (200 mpg_{‑imp}; 160 mpg_{‑US})

Honda CD70 (formerly known as the Honda 70) is a four stroke motorcycle produced by Honda of Japan from 1970 to 1991. Production moved to Atlas Honda of Pakistan in 1991.

Introduced to compete against rival two-stroke small capacity motorcycles, the Honda 70 had a Four stroke engine with a displacement of 72 cc (4.4 cu in). Models from the year 1970 to 1983 were sold under the name "Honda 70", with "Honda 70" markings on the side covers.

The Honda 70 had a rectangular speedometer with gear range markings and a maximum calibration of 60 mph (97 km/h). The claimed top speed was 58 mph (93 km/h). The engines continued to be upgraded every few years. In 1984 the Honda 70 was rebranded as the Honda CD70.

== Minor Changes ==
In 2012 the CD70 saw some cosmetic upgrades, chrome turn signals were replaced with all black plastic ones, and a few other visual changes.

== Sales ==
From 31 March 2020 to 31 March 2021, Atlas Honda sold upwards of 800,000 CD-70s.

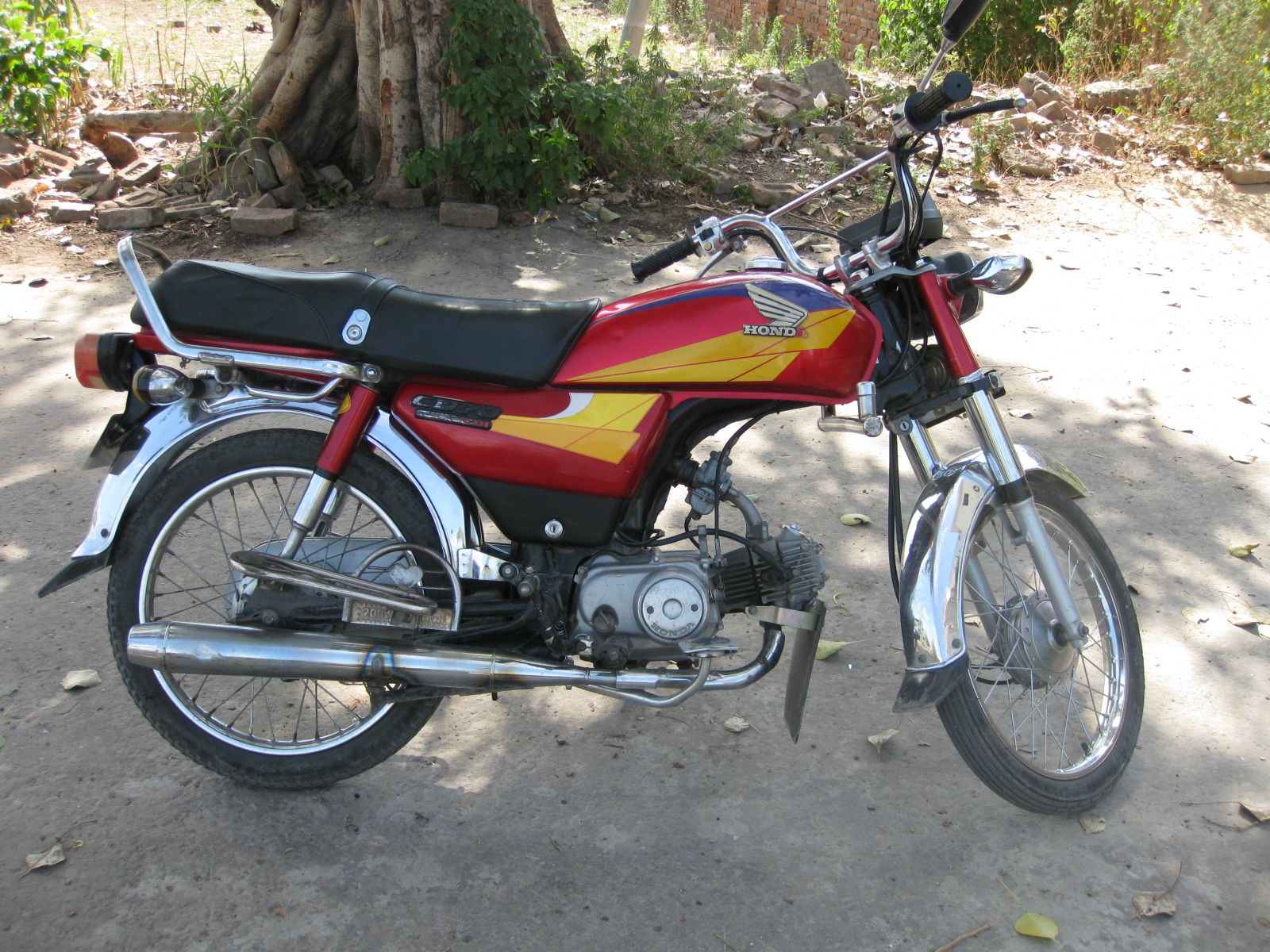
Honda CD 70 an old model. No major changes since 20 years.

== See also ==
- Honda CL70
- Honda SL70
