= Trade Development Authority of Pakistan =

Department of the Pakistan Ministry of Commerce

- Formation: 2013; 13 years ago
- Headquarters: Karachi, Pakistan
- Official language: English & Urdu
- Parent organization: Ministry of Commerce
- Website: www.tdap.gov.pk
- Formerly called: Export Promotion Bureau

The Trade Development Authority of Pakistan (TDAP) (Urdu: مقتدرہ ترقی تجارت پاکستان) is an organisation under the Ministry of Commerce of the Government of Pakistan. It facilitates and promotes international trade of Pakistan. The current Chief Executive of TDAP is Mr. Faiz Ahmad, a BPS-22 officer from Civil Services of Pakistan. It is manned by Central Superior Service officers of Commerce and Trade Group, a trained cadre for commerce, trade diplomacy and industry.

== Background ==
The department was established on 8 November 2006 under a Presidential Ordinance, as a successor organization to the Export Promotion Bureau, which was established in 1963. The TDAP is mandated to have a larger view of global trade development, rather than only the export promotion - together with its 14 regional offices, the department performs facilitation and regulatory functions as well as providing supply side and marketing assistance to exporters. It arranges awareness seminars and workshops to educate the Pakistani business community about the latest conditions and trends in the global markets.

== Exports and trade shows ==
In 2011, Pakistan's exports of stones, marble, granites to China doubled due to effective marketing strategies developed by TDAP.

On a regular basis, TDAP facilitates and encourages Pakistani business community to exhibit their products at all major trade shows in Pakistan including at Karachi Expo Centre and Lahore Expo Center.

== E-commerce ==
In 2017, Trade Development Authority of Pakistan (TDAP) signed a 'Memorandum of Understanding' with the China-based Alibaba Group to promote exports through e-commerce.

== See also ==
- Pakistan Gems and Jewellery Development Company
- Small and Medium Enterprise Development Authority
