= One Tambon One Product =

Thai program to support regional products

One Tambon One Product (OTOP) is a local entrepreneurship stimulus program designed by Thailand's former Prime Minister Thaksin Shinawatra during his 2001–2006 Thai Rak Thai government. The program aimed to support locally made and marketed products of each of Thailand's 7,255 tambon (sub-districts). Drawing its inspiration from Japan's successful One Village One Product (OVOP) program, the OTOP program encourages village communities to improve the quality and marketing of local products, selecting one superior product from each tambon to receive formal branding as its "starred OTOP product". It provides both a local and national stage to the promote these products. OTOP includes a large array of local products, including traditional handicrafts, cotton and silk garments, pottery, fashion accessories, household items, and foods. After a military junta overthrew Thaksin's government in 2006 following an election cancelled for irregularities, the OTOP program was cancelled. However, it was soon revived and rebranded.

The One Tambon One Product movement is a self-help effort wherein rural communities participate in the creation of a product that can be sold locally and internationally.

== Management and organization ==
OTOP is managed by the Community Development Department (CDD) of Thailand's Interior Ministry.

There are 36,000 OTOP groups in Thailand, each having between 30 and 3,000 members. Sakda Siridechakul, president of Chiang Mai's OTOP association noted, "OTOP has helped spread income to many people in the villages. It has allowed people producing handicrafts to feel they are part of the global economy."

== Financials ==
In 2017 OTOP product sales were 153 billion baht. The government aims for sales of 200-300 billion baht every year.

The government allocated an 8.3 billion baht budget to the CDD to stimulate community tourism in 3,273 villages across the country between April–September 2018. Among the program's aims are to develop at least 64,570 new OTOP items with an average annual sales growth of at least 10 percent.

In the FY2020 budget, the government allocated 363 million baht to support OTOP, down from 901 million baht in FY2019 and 1.24 billion baht in FY2018.

== OTOP Product Champion ==
One of the mechanisms to promote and support the development of Thai OTOP products is the "Product Champion" (OPC). Besides setting up OTOP communities and small to medium enterprises (SME), a seminar called "Smart OTOP" has now provided more than 26,600 participants advice in improving their skills and knowledge in order to develop better products. The number of participants increases each year.

A rating system for OTOP products is followed, the highest being five stars. At last count, there were 569 five-star products.

== See also ==
- One Town One Product (Republic of China)
- One Town, One Product (OTOP) – Philippines
