= Ghandhara Industries Limited =

Pakistani company

Ghandhara Industries
- Formerly: National Motors Limited (1972–1999)
- Type: Public
- Traded as: PSX: GHNI
- Industry: Automotive
- Founded: 1953
- Headquarters: Karachi, Sindh, Pakistan
- Area served: Pakistan
- Key people: Ahmad Kuli Khan Khattak (CEO)
- Products: Trucks and buses
- Revenue: ▼ Rs. 14.542 billion (US$52 million) (2023)
- Operating income: ▼ Rs. 1.193 billion (US$4.3 million) (2023)
- Net income: ▼ Rs. 179.424 million (US$640,000) (2023)
- Total assets: ▼ Rs. 16.495 billion (US$59 million) (2023)
- Total equity: ▲ Rs. 8.222 billion (US$29 million) (2023)
- Number of employees: 664 (2023)
- Parent: Bibojee Group (39%); Ghandhara Automobiles Limited (19%); Universal Insurance (6%)
- Website: gil.com.pk
- Footnotes; Financials as of 30 June 2023

Ghandhara Industries Limited (GIL) (Urdu: گندھارا انڈسٹریز لمیٹڈ), formerly known as National Motors Limited, doing business as Isuzu Pakistan, is a Pakistani truck and buses assembler based in Karachi. It is the authorized assembler of Isuzu vehicles in Pakistan.

The major business activities of the company are progressive manufacturing, assembling and marketing Isuzu trucks and buses at its plant in SITE Town, Karachi.

== History ==
Ghandhara Industries Limited originated from a mobile assembly plant established in Karachi in 1942 to support U.S. military operations. It was incorporated as General Motors Overseas Distribution with the inauguration of a Karachi branch in 1949. Construction of a permanent facility began in 1951 and a facility to assemble trucks and buses began operational on July 4, 1953. In 1956, car production facility with models such as Chevrolet, Bedford, and Vauxhall was added. The facility was shuttered on October 28, 1963, and was acquired by Ghandhara Industries, which later added Holden and Opel (primarily Kadett) models to its production line in the mid-1960s.

In 1972, the Government of Pakistan nationalized Ghandhara Industries and renamed it National Motors Limited. It continued to produce Vauxhalls into the 1970s while ceasing the import of American Chevrolets.

In 1984, the Toyota franchise was transferred to Toyota Indus.

In January 1992, Bibojee Group acquired National Motors Limited for PKR 150.44 million (US$ 24.50 million), under the privatization scheme of the Government of Pakistan. The Bibojee companies are owned by the heirs of Habibullah Khan Khattak. In 1999, the company was renamed to its original name.

In 2017, Ghandhara Industries made it to 'Forbes Asia's 200 Best Under A Billion list of companies.

== Products ==
(Double Cab/Pickup Truck)

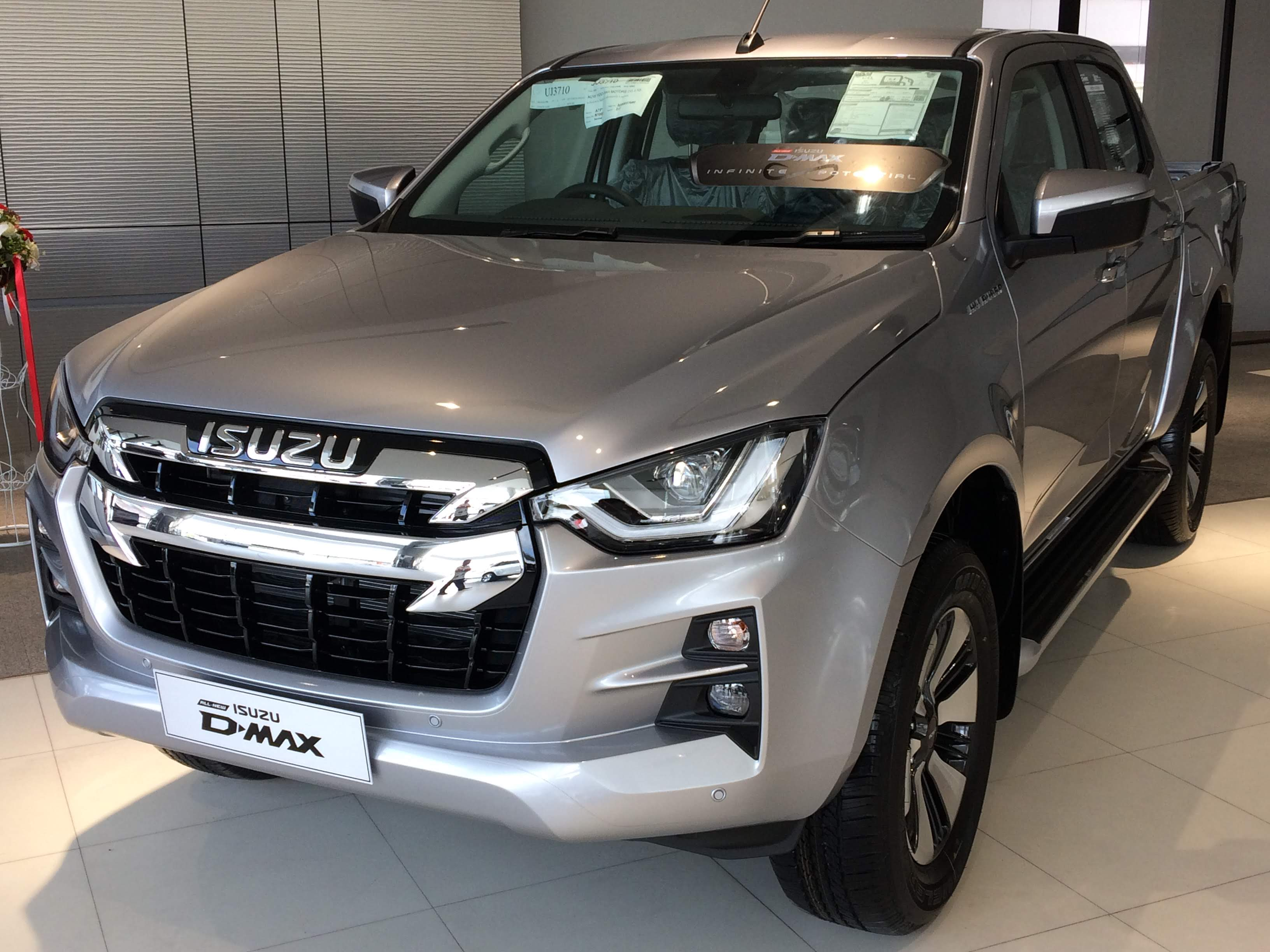
2019 Isuzu D-Max Hi-Lander (double cab)

- Isuzu D-Max

=== N series/Isuzu Elf trucks ===
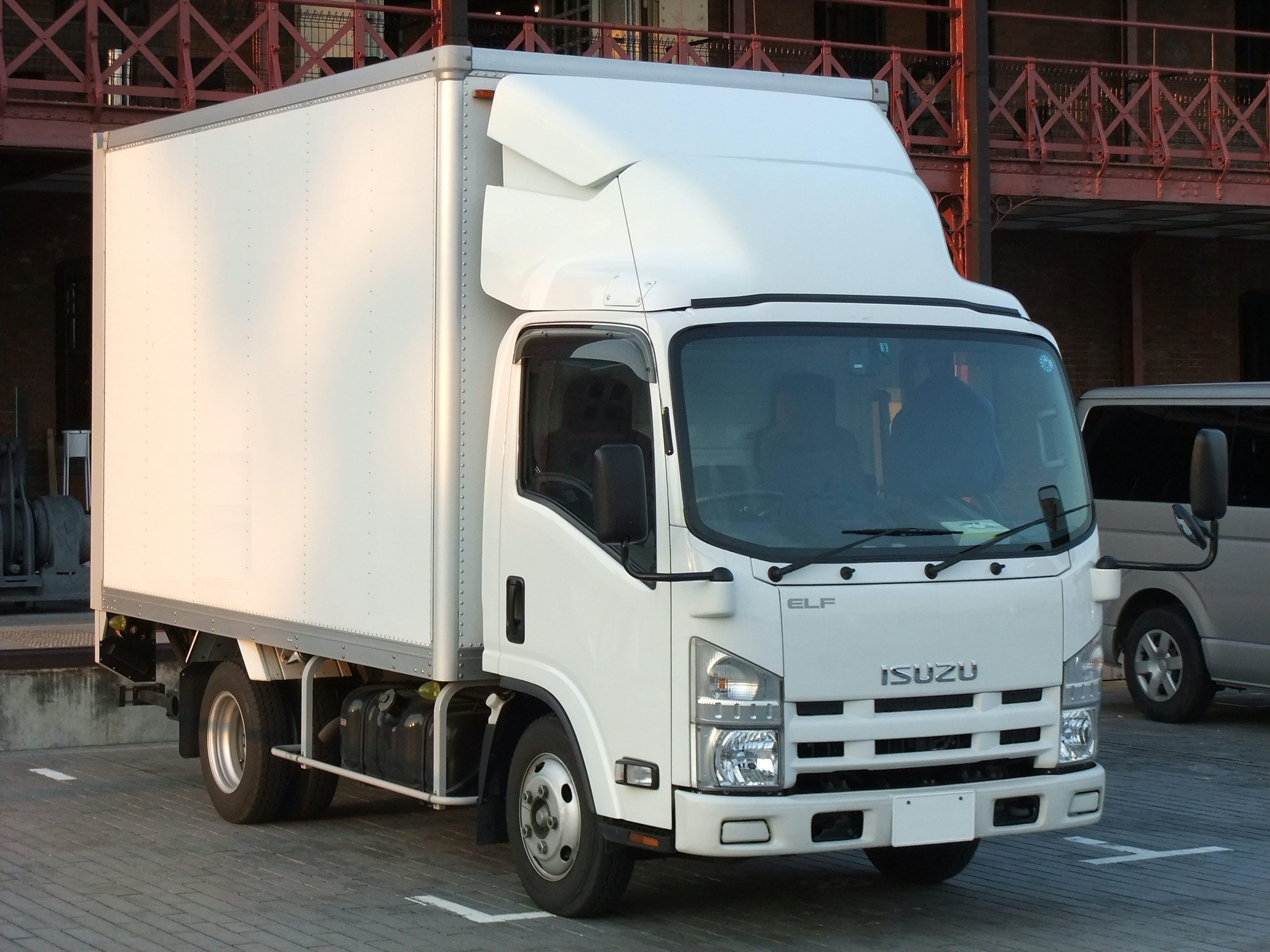
Isuzu Elf Delivery Truck

- Isuzu NHR55
- Isuzu NKR55
- Isuzu NPR66
- Isuzu NPS71

=== F series/Isuzu Forward trucks and prime movers ===
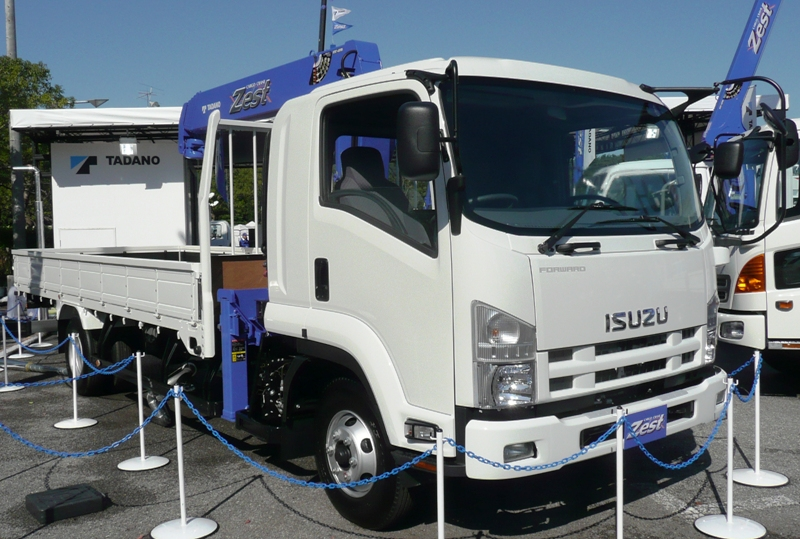
Fifth Generation Forward with Tadano Crane

- Isuzu FTR33
- Isuzu FVR34/90
- Isuzu FVZ
- Isuzu FVZ340 HD
- Isuzu FTS33H

=== C series/Isuzu Giga trucks and prime movers ===
- Isuzu CYZ

=== Buses/Coaches ===
- NKR55 Microbus
- NPR66 Minicoach
- MT133/MT134 (Passenger Bus)
