= Atlas Group =

Pakistani business group

- Company type: Corporate group
- Founded: 1962; 64 years ago
- Founder: Yusuf H. Shirazi
- Headquarters: Lahore, Pakistan
- Total assets: ▲US$ 1 Billion (2017)
- Number of employees: 10,000
- Website: atlas.com.pk

Atlas Group is a group of companies headquartered in Lahore, Pakistan. The group was founded by Yusuf H. Shirazi who was the chairman of Atlas Group. He was also the founder member of Karachi Stock Exchange, Lahore Stock Exchange and International Chamber of Commerce and Industry. Mr Yousaf Shirazi died on 20 October 2019.

Atlas Group has its operations in power generation, engineering, financial services and trading fields. The group expanded internationally with ventures in Dubai, named Atlas Worldwide and Atlas Ventures, and an office in China.

== History ==
Atlas Group began as Shirazi Investment Private Limited (SIL) in 1962 with a capital of PKR 0.5 million and three employees, evolving into a diversified entity with operations in power generation, engineering, financial services, and trading.

The group's early ventures included real estate, securities, and franchises. In 1963, it entered into a Technical Assistance Agreement with Honda Motor Company Limited, forming Atlas Honda Ltd for motorcycle manufacturing in Pakistan.

In 1966, Atlas Battery Limited (ABL) was established to produce lead acid storage batteries in collaboration with Japan Storage Battery Company Limited, using AGS as its brand name.

During the political and economic upheavals of the early 1970s, particularly after the 1971 partition of Pakistan and the nationalization of industries in 1973, Atlas Group faced significant financial challenges. The devaluation of the Pakistani rupee and subsequent economic conditions impacted the company's finances, including its liabilities to financial institutions such as the Pakistan Industrial Credit and Investment Corporation (PICIC) and Investment Corporation of Pakistan (ICP). Despite these challenges, Atlas Group fulfilled its financial obligations, which helped maintain its credibility.

In 1973, Atlas Group diversified its portfolio by founding Shirazi Trading Company (STC). Further diversification occurred in 1978 with the establishment of Panjdarya near Lahore, a private limited company aimed at manufacturing Honda motorcycles, a venture that was initiated to replace the Atlas Epak Limited project lost after the secession of East Pakistan, now Bangladesh. This venture was a joint effort with Honda Motors of Japan and was later merged with Atlas Honda Ltd.

During the late 1970s and early 1980s, the group acquired three companies. R.R. Industries, dealing in office equipment, was merged into Shirazi Trading Company despite running at a loss. In 1979, the group acquired controlling shares of Muslim Insurance Company Ltd (MIC), later renamed Atlas Insurance Limited (AIL). Despite AIL's initial financial instability and overstaffing issues, the group turned the company around, significantly increasing its equity and balance sheet. The third acquisition was Allwin Engineering Industries Limited (renamed Atlas Engineering Limited) in 1981, a manufacturer of automotive components that faced tax and legal issues which the group resolved. Both Allwin and MIC were subsequently listed on the Karachi Stock Exchange.

By 1980, Atlas had expanded its operations with manufacturing companies, dealing in products ranging from construction equipment to solar-powered navigational systems. During this period, the group also formed partnerships which included franchises of the MAN Group and General Electric (GE), along with associations with TATA and Indian Steel Mills.

From 1981 to 2000, Atlas Group continued its expansion in the engineering and financial sectors by establishing four new companies: Honda Atlas Cars Pakistan Ltd (1992), Honda Atlas Power Products (1997), Atlas Lease Ltd (1989), and Atlas Investment Bank Ltd (1990).

As of 2016, Atlas Powergen had joint venture agreements with Siemens of Germany and SEPCO3 of China to set up power plants in Pakistan.

== Management ==
The management of Atlas Group is overseen by a Group Executive Committee, comprising four senior executives and three sponsors. The group maintained a policy of hiring based on merit rather than personal connections, focusing on the individuals' value systems. Employee development was a priority, with opportunities for further education and international training programs.

== Subsidiaries ==
=== Listed ===
- Atlas Honda
- Honda Atlas
- Atlas Battery
- Atlas Insurance, founded as Muslim Insurance in 1957

=== Unlisted ===
- Atlas Engineering, founded as Allwin Engineering
- Atlas Asset Management

== Former subsidiaries ==
=== Atlas Bank ===
Atlas Bank Limited was founded in 2006 following the merger of Atlas Lease Limited and Atlas Investment Bank Limited. Atlas Investment Bank was a small investment bank affiliated with the Bank of Tokyo, which specialized in investment banking and portfolio management. However, in March 2009, the Atlas Group sold its majority shares to Summit Bank.

=== Atlas Power ===
Atlas Power Limited was founded in 2007 as a joint venture with MAN SE. It was a 215 MW power plant in Sheikhupura which was established at a cost of $169 million. In October 2024, the Government of Pakistan terminated its energy purchase agreement with Atlas Power and as a result the power plant is no longer operational.
