= Phuleli =

Canal in Pakistan

Coordinates: 25.379994°N 68.383796°E

Phuleli is an irrigation and wastewater canal in Hyderabad, Sindh, Pakistan, which also provides water for Badin and Tando Muhammad Khan Districts. Built in 1955 to address the irrigation and municipal water needs of the left bank regions of lower Sindh, the non-perennial canal operates with a discharge capacity of 15.000 cubic feet of water per second (CUSEC). Phuleli canal begins at the Ghulam Muhammad (Kotri) Barrage, on the left bank of the Indus River, and runs roughly 1162 km (721.8 m) around and through the outskirts of Hyderabad, Sindh province's second-largest city.

Generally, the water from Phuleli is routed for local agriculture and larger irrigation needs, although some settlements, even cities, within its jurisdiction may have it available for personal or home use. It is often used as a dump for wastewater and solid waste, as well as untreated industrial wastewater, and is not safe for drinking or personal use.

== Pollution ==
Badin district suffers from poor sanitation, inadequate safe drinking water, and untreated sewage and residential waste disposal, as well as untreated industrial effluent disposal, all of which contribute to contamination, pollution, and public health hazards, as well as a loss of bio-diversity.

When the Phuleli Canal runs through Hyderabad city, highly toxic effluent from plastic industries, illegal livestock pens, slaughterhouses, and municipal sewage water are directly poured into the canal, deteriorating the canal water quality and endangering the health and lives of millions of people.
