= Karachi Expo Center =

Convention center in Sindh, Pakistan

- مرکز نمایشگاه کراچی
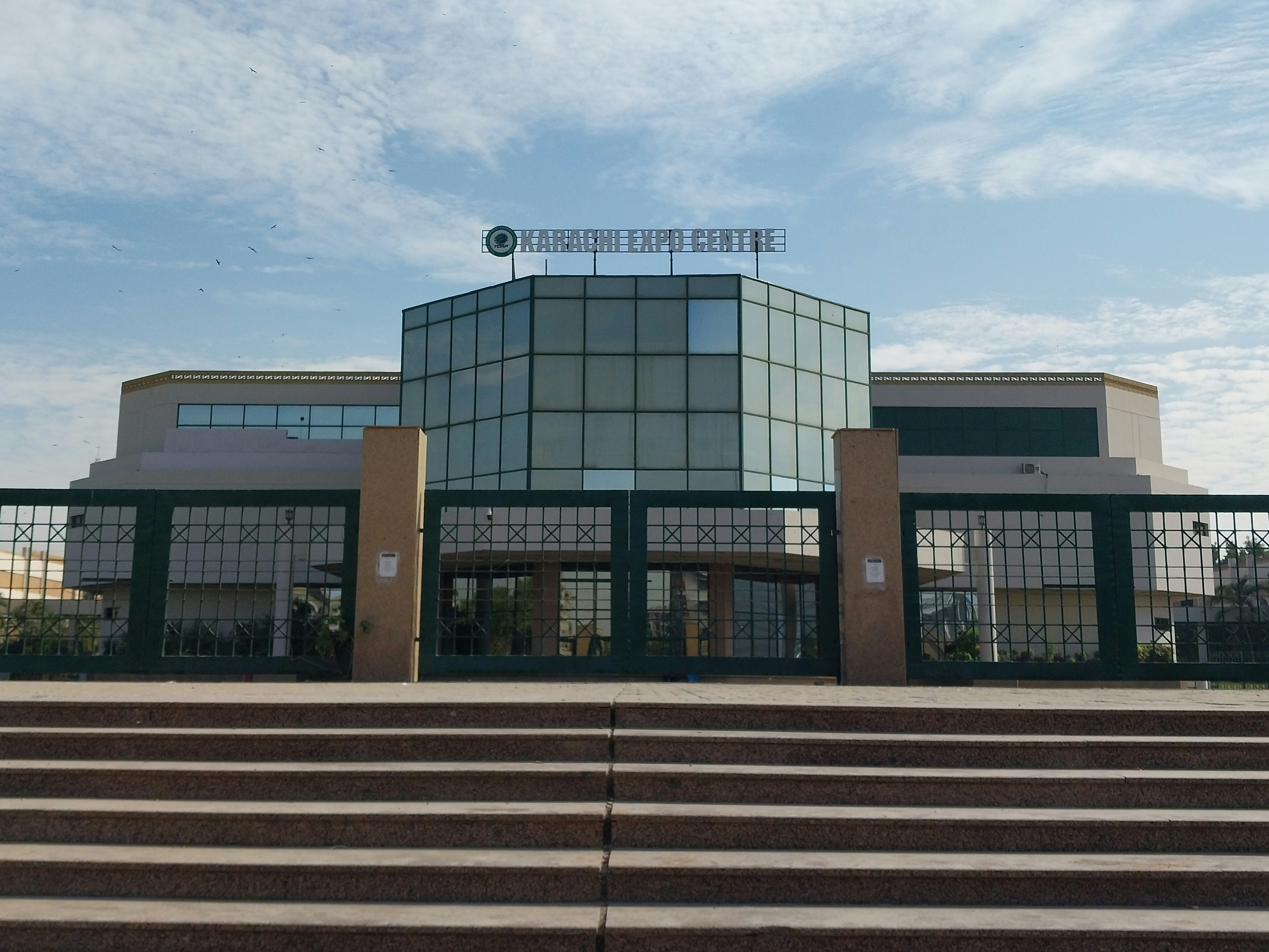
- Interactive map of Karachi Expo Center
- Location: Main University Road, Gulshan-e-Iqbal, Karachi, Sindh, Pakistan
- Coordinates: 24°54′5″N 67°4′33.9″E
- Owner: Trade Development Authority of Pakistan
- Type: Conference centre/Arena
- Events: Exhibitions, Conferences

Website
- Karachi Expo Center

Karachi Expo Center is the convention center where Pakistani products are showcased internationally. The center consists of 6 halls. The Trade Development Authority of Pakistan also helps support the exhibitions at the center.

== Exhibitions ==
=== IDEAS ===
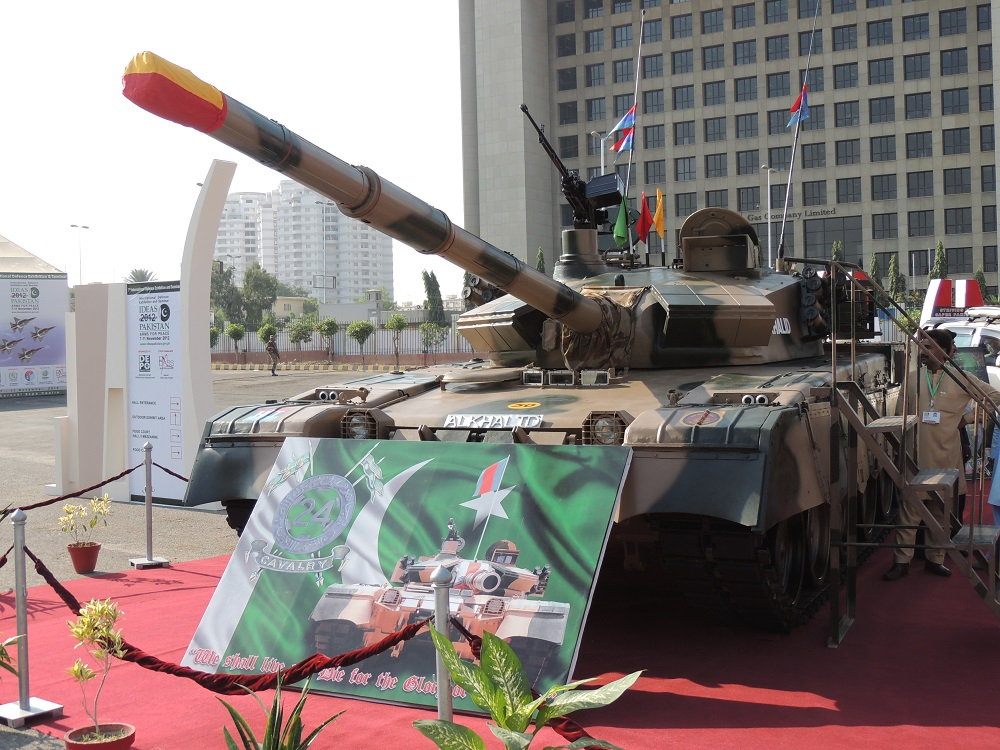
IDEAS 2012 held at Karachi Expo Center

Pakistani military arms and equipment exhibitions are held under the theme 'IDEAS' (International Defence Exhibition and Seminar). This is a four-day exhibition.

=== 'My Karachi' ===
Since 2003, 'My Karachi' themed exhibitions are held annually at Expo Center Karachi where companies and traders of Karachi as well as foreign exhibitors market their products. This three-day long exhibition is organized annually by the Karachi Chamber of Commerce and Industry (KCCI). The products are showcased for around one million visitors. This will provide a platform for business-to-business and business-to-consumer meetings. Importance of this exhibition is emphasized as city of Karachi is considered the economic and financial hub of Pakistan.

=== 'Dawn All About Lifestyle' ===
Another prominent exhibition theme at Expo Center Karachi is 'Dawn Lifestyle'. It is sponsored by Dawn Media Group since 2001.

=== IT and Telecom Asia ===
Exhibition showcases IT and telecommunication technologies in 3-day exhibitions at Expo Center Karachi.

== Vaccination Centre - Karachi East ==
Expo Center Karachi was converted into a 24-hour vaccination centre for the people of Karachi during COVID-19 (2020-2021).

== Specifications ==
Exposition areas
Hall	Square meter
1	2,230
2	2,230
3	2,230
4	3,345
5	3,345
6	3,345

Karachi Expo Center buildings are centrally air conditioned, with many restaurants and parking areas for 2400 cars.
