= One Village One Product movement =

Japanese development program

The One village one product movement (一村一品運動, Isson Ippin Undō, OVOP) is a Japanese regional development program. It began in Ōita Prefecture in 1979 when the then-governor Morihiko Hiramatsu advocated the program, based on the first New Plum and Chestnut (NPC) movement which started in 1961. Implementation started in 1980. Communities selectively produce goods with high added value. One village produces one competitive and staple product as a business to gain sales revenue to improve the standard of living for the residents of that village. Among them are shiitake, kabosu, greenhouse mikan, beef, aji, and barley shōchū. Over 300 products have been selected.

The initiative has been promoted across Asian, African and Latin American countries.

Prime Minister Thaksin Shinawatra of Thailand initiated a similar program, One Tambon One Product. Thailand already had One Village One Product but using Thai name Setakit (Economy) and Chunchon (Community). Thus Thailand One Product One Village had been launched since 1996 under The 8th National Economic and Social Development Plan.

== See also ==
- Japanese craft
- Meibutsu
- Omiyage
