= List of auto shows and motor shows by continent =

An auto show (also: motor show or car show) is a public exhibition of current automobile models, debuts, concept cars, or out-of-production classics. The five most prestigious auto shows, sometimes called the "Big Five", are generally considered to be held in Frankfurt, Geneva, Detroit, Paris and Tokyo.

== Africa and The Middle East ==
- Dubai International Motor Show, UAE (November)
- Festival of Motoring, South Africa, Johannesburg (October) (Biennial)
- idle Auto Expo, South Africa, Johannesburg (June) annually
- Qatar Motor Show, Doha (January)
- Supercar Spectacle, Accra, Ghana (December)

== Asia ==
- Azerbaijan International Automotive Exhibition
- Bangkok International Motor Show (April)
- Beijing International Automotive Exhibition (Auto China) (Biennial)
- Bharat Mobility Global Expo (New Delhi, India)
- Busan International Mobility Show
- Dhaka Motor Show
- Guangzhou International Motor Show (Auto Guangzhou)
- Gaikindo Indonesia International Auto Show (GIIAS) (BSD City, July)
- Indonesia International Motor Show (IIMS) (Jakarta, February)
- Gaikindo Indonesia International Commercial Vehicle Expo (GICOMVEC) (Biennial)
- Gaikindo Jakarta Auto Week (GJAW) (BSD City, November)
- Indonesia Motorcycle Show (IMOS) (BSD City, October)
- Istanbul Auto Show
- Kuala Lumpur International Mobility Show (KLIMS), June)
- Manila International Auto Show (Manila, April)
- Osaka Auto Messe (Osaka, February
- Pakistan Auto Show (Karachi, Lahore)
- Periklindo Electric Vehicle Show (PEVS) (Jakarta, April)
- Philippine International Motor Show (Pasay, August)
- Phnom Penh Auto Show (April)
- Seoul Mobility Show
- Shanghai Motor Show aka Auto Shanghai (Biennial)
- Thailand International Motor Expo (December)
- Thrissur Motor Show (India)
- Tokyo Auto Salon (Tokyo, January)
- Tokyo Motor Show (October–November)
- Vietnam Motor Show (October)

== Europe ==
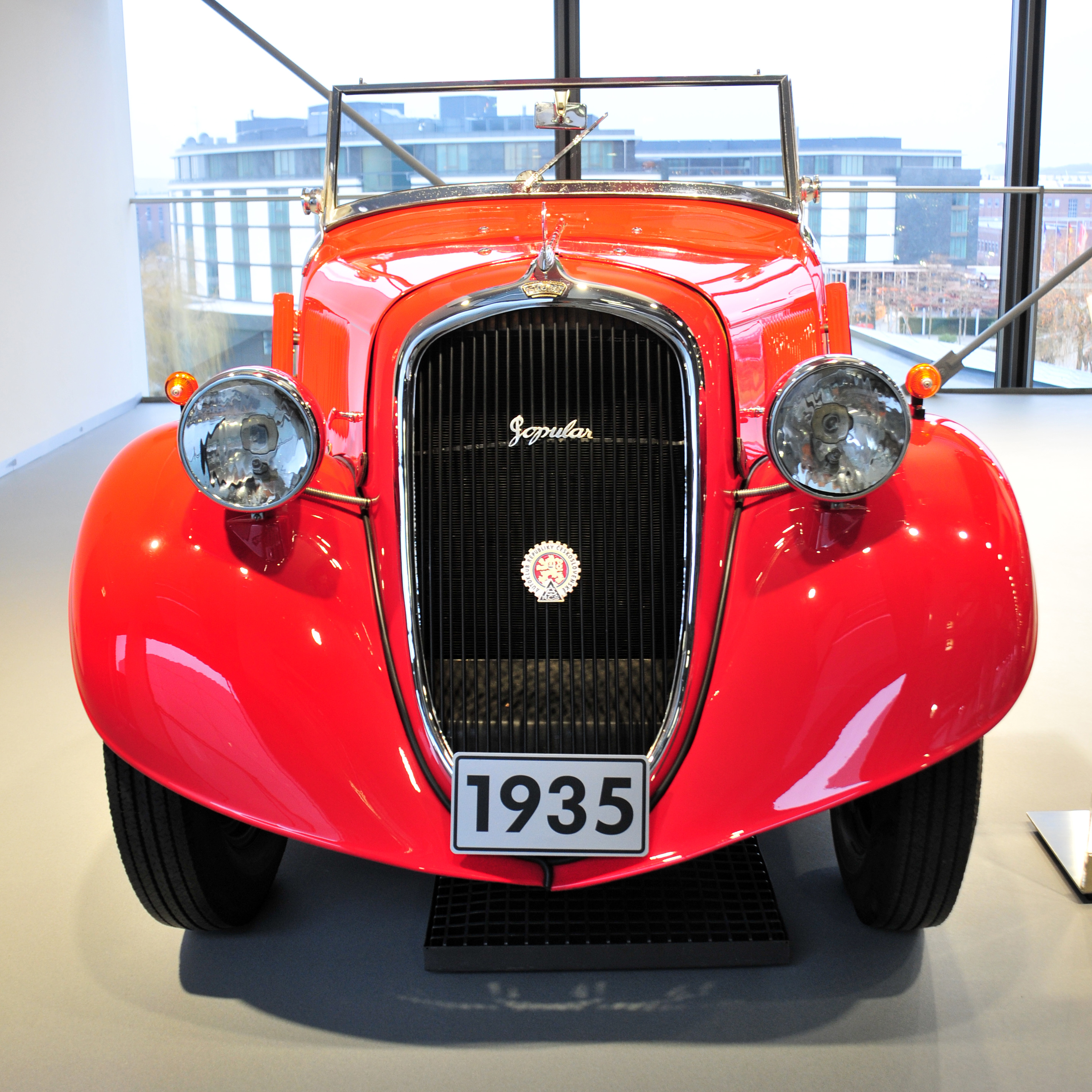
Car at an auto show in Germany

- Athens International Motor Show, Athens
- Auto Mobil International (AMI Leipzig), (Leipzig, Germany)
- AutoRAI, Amsterdam (1895–2011)
- Autosport International (Birmingham, United Kingdom, January)
- Azerbaijan International Automotive Exhibition
- Barcelona International Motor Show/Automobile Barcelona, Barcelona (May - biennial)
- Bologna Motor Show (1976–2017)
- British International Motor Show (1903–2008)
- British Motor Show
- Brussels Motor Show (European Motor Show)
- Chantilly Arts & Elegance Richard Mille (June - biennial)
- Concorso d'Eleganza Villa d'Este
- Essen Motor Show
- Full of the Pipe truck show, Ireland
- Geneva Motor Show (Salon International de l'Auto) (March) (1905–2019, 2024)
- Goodwood Festival of Speed
- Helsinki Motor Show, Helsinki, Finland
- International Motor Show Germany (IAA), Munich (September - biennial)
- Istanbul Auto Show
- London Motorfair/London Motor Show (1977–1999, 2016–2019)
- London Motorexpo, Canary Wharf (1996–2015)
- Madrid Motor Show, Madrid (May) (biennial)
- Michelin Challenge Bibendum
- Mille Miglia
- Mondial de l'Automobile, Paris, (September–October - biennial) (English: Paris Motor Show)
- Power Big Meet
- Rallyday
- The Commercial Vehicle Show, (Birmingham)
- Truckfest, United Kingdom

== Latin America ==
- Autoclasica, (Buenos Aires, Argentina) - (October)
- Salón Internacional del Automóvil México (Mexico City, Mexico) - (September–October)
- São Paulo International Motor Show, (Salão International do Automóvel de São Paulo), (São Paulo, Brazil) - (October–November)

== North America ==
- Alabama International Auto Show (Birmingham, Alabama)
- Amelia Island Concours d'Elegance (Amelia Island, Florida)
- Arizona International Auto Show (Phoenix, Arizona)
- Canadian International Auto Show (Toronto, Ontario)
- Cleveland Auto Show (Cleveland, Ohio)
- Chicago Auto Show
- Detroit Autorama (Detroit, Michigan)
- First Hawaiian Motor Con (Honolulu)
- Fleetwood Country Cruize-In Auto Show (London, Ontario)
- Florence Merchants Car Show (May 18, 2025)
- Hot Import Nights (various venues)
- Houston Auto Show
- Kool April Nites (Redding, California)
- LA Auto Show
- Lehigh Valley Auto Show
- Memphis International Auto Show (Memphis, Tennessee)
- Miami International Auto Show (Miami, Florida)
- Milwaukee Auto Show
- Moab Jeep Safari, (Moab, Utah)
- Montreal International Auto Show (Montreal, Quebec)
- Nashville International Auto Show (Nashville, Tennessee)
- New England International Auto Show (Boston, Massachusetts)
- New England Summer Nationals (Worcester, Massachusetts)
- Newport Concours d'Elegance
- New York International Auto Show
- North American International Auto Show (Detroit, Michigan)
- North Texas Auto Expo (Dallas, Texas)
- Northwood University International Auto Show
- OC Auto Show (Anaheim, California)
- Pebble Beach Concours d'Elegance
- Pennsylvania Auto Show (Harrisburg, Pennsylvania)
- Philadelphia Auto Show
- Pittsburgh International Auto Show
- Portland International Auto Show
- Powerama Motoring Expo (Edmonton, Alberta, Canada; defunct)
- Rick Ross Car Show (Fayette County, Georgia)
- Salon de l'auto de Québec (Quebec City)
- Salon International de l’Auto de Montréal
- San Francisco International Auto Show
- Scarsdale Concours d'Elegance (Scarsdale, New York)
- Seattle International Auto Show
- Sevenstock (Irwindale, California)
- Texas Auto Show (Dallas)
- Ultimate Motorhead Show (Bloomsburg, Pennsylvania)
- Vancouver International Auto Show (Vancouver, British Columbia)
- Washington, D.C. Auto Show
- Woodward Dream Cruise (Oakland County, Michigan, August)

== Oceania ==
- Australian International Motor Show, (Sydney Motor Show), (Sydney)
- Melbourne Motor Show, (Melbourne)

== Defunct Auto Shows ==
- Great West Truck Show (Las Vegas, Nevada)
- Teamwork & Technology: For Today and Tomorrow, (New York City, New York)

== See also ==
- Organisation Internationale des Constructeurs d'Automobiles
- Green vehicle motor show
