= Summernationals =

Summernationals (also style SummerNationals) may refer to:

- New England Summer Nationals
- UMP DIRTcar Summer Nationals; see United Midwestern Promoters
- AHRA SummerNationals; see American Hot Rod Association
- NHRA Summernationals
- USS Summer Nationals; see United States Swimming National Championships
- Summer Nationals (EP), a covers EP by The Offspring

== See also ==
- Dominican Summer League Nationals
- Summernats
