= Portland International Auto Show =

Annual auto show

Oregon International Auto Show

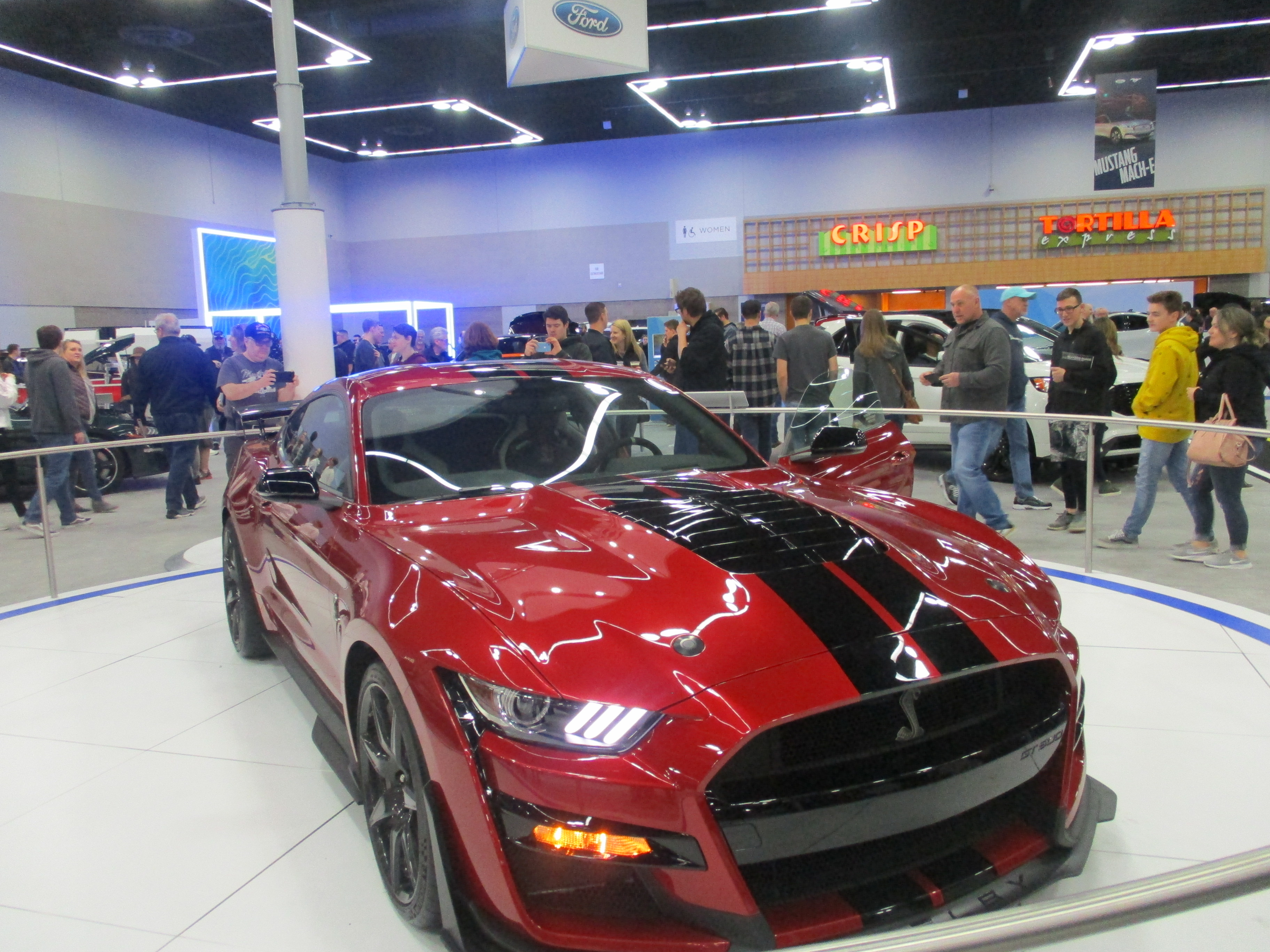
- A Mustang GT500 at the 2020 show
- Status: Active
- Genre: Auto show
- Venue: Oregon Convention Center
- Locations: Portland, Oregon; 45.528644°N 122.663201°W
- Country: USA
- Inaugurated: 1910
- Attendance: 100,000 (2012)
- Organizer: Oregon Automobile Dealer's Association
- Website: https://www.oregonautoshow.com

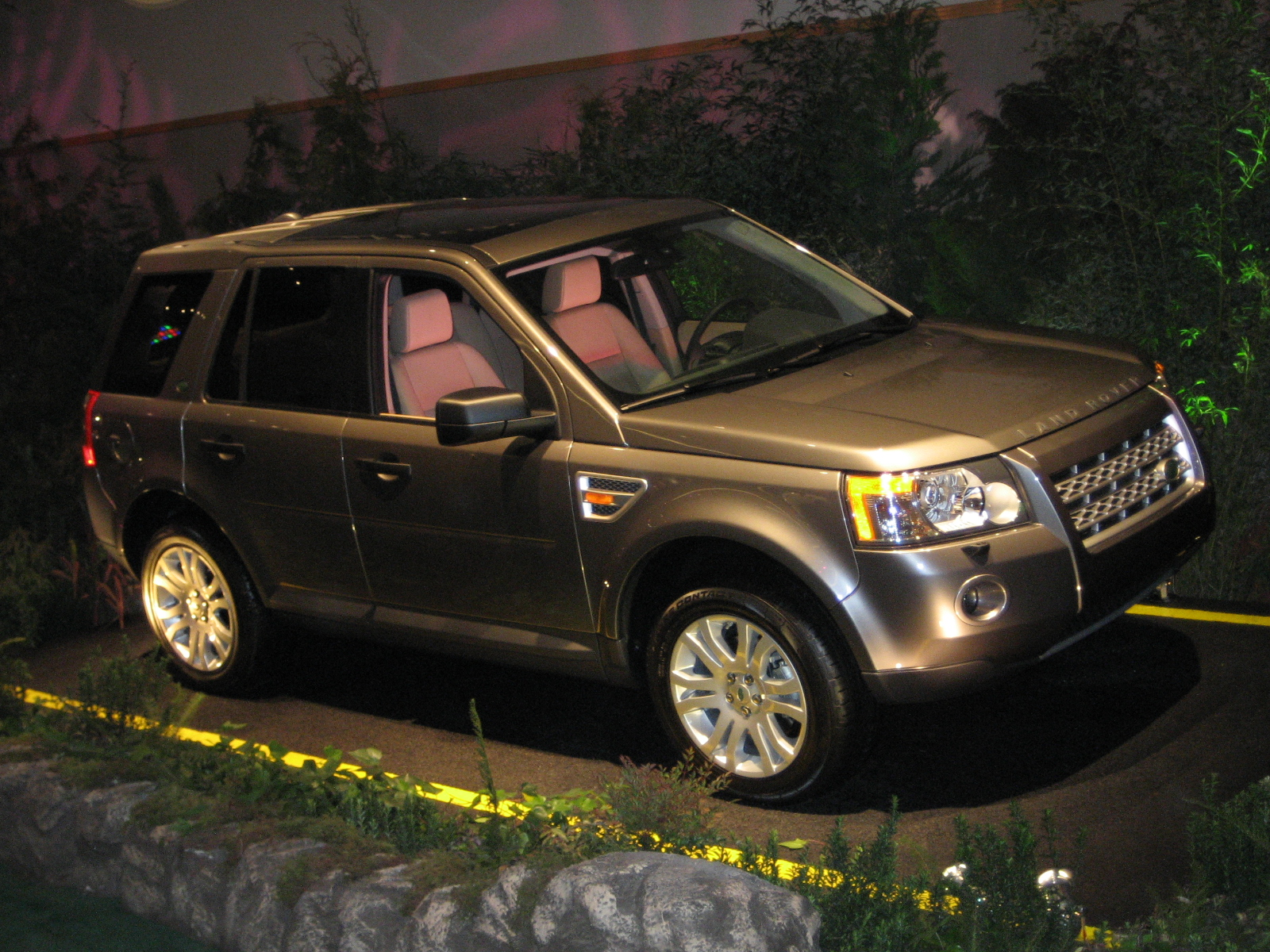
A Land Rover at the 2007 show

The Oregon International Auto Show is an annual auto show at the Oregon Convention Center in Portland in the U.S. state of Oregon. Started in 1910, the four-day event is held in January or February and draws approximately 100,000 visitors.

== History ==
Portland first automotive show launched in 1910. The show in 2010 was affected by a poor economy, with several manufacturers not participating. The Auto Show's 2011 event featured more than 1,200 cars from a total of 35 brands. In 2012, Chrysler debuted their Camp Jeep ride and drive program at the Portland show, and an exhibit entitled the ECO Center, featuring more environmentally friendly vehicles. Also that year, a Lamborghini Gallardo caught on fire when an employee attempted to burn off fuel by running it in neutral. The 2012 show had an estimated 100,000 visitors over four days.

== See also ==
- List of auto shows and motor shows by continent
