= Pennsylvania Auto Show =

Annual auto show

The Pennsylvania Auto Show is an American annual auto show held in Harrisburg, Pennsylvania at the Pennsylvania Farm Show Complex & Expo Center.

== Show info ==
The show is operated by Motor Trend and is sponsored annually by the Harrisburg Automotive Trade Association and The Patriot-News, the region's largest daily newspaper. The Antique Automobile Club of America displays a variety of classic and original cars from its museum located in nearby Hershey, Pennsylvania. Other private automobile collections are on display as well boats and RVs/campers. In 2010 the all-new certified pre-owned showcase was added to the show.

== See also ==
- List of auto shows and motor shows by continent
