= Pakistan Auto Show =

Pakistan Auto Show پاکستان آٹو شو
- Status: Active
- Genre: Auto show
- Frequency: Annual
- Venue: Karachi Expo Center; Expo Centre Lahore
- Country: Pakistan
- Years active: 2005–present
- Previous event: 12 April 2019 – 15 April 2019 Karachi
- Next event: 21 February 2020 – 23 February 2020 Lahore
- Attendance: See here.
- Organiser: Pakistan Association of Automotive Parts & Accessories Manufacturers
- Website: www.paps.pk pakistanautoshow.com/web/

The Pakistan Auto Show (PAS, Urdu: پاکستان آٹو شو) is a motor show held annually in Pakistan, alternating between Karachi and Lahore. The motor show began in 2005 and displays both passenger vehicles (including some motorcycles) and commercial vehicles. The PAS is organized by the Pakistan Association of Automotive Parts & Accessories Manufacturers.

== Shows ==
=== 2013 ===
The 9th Pakistan Auto Show was held in Karachi from 11 January to 14 January 2013.

=== 2014 ===
The 10th Pakistan Auto Show was held in Lahore from 6 March to 8 March 2014.

=== 2015 ===
The 11th Pakistan Auto Show was held in Karachi from 6 March to 8 March 2015.

=== 2016 ===
The 12th Pakistan Auto Show was held in Lahore from 4 March to 6 March 2016.

=== 2017 ===
The 13th Pakistan Auto Show was held in Karachi from 3 March to 5 March 2017.

=== 2018 ===
The 14th Pakistan Auto Show is scheduled to be held in Lahore from 2 March to 4 March 2018.

In the event, MNA Shaista Pervaiz Malik, Chairman PAPAAM Iftikhar Ahmed, member PAPAAM Syed Nabeel Hashmi, Director Indus Motors Company Tariq Ahmed Khan, Honda Atlas Group Amir Sherazi, new managing Director Pak Suzuki, Ravi Motors Sheikh Umer, large number of local and international exhibitors were present at the event. The minister industries visited various stalls established by local and various multinational companies. The international exhibitors include renowned companies from Japan, China, Germany, France, Turkey, Thailand, Taiwan, England, USA, UAE and Sri Lanka.

The highlights of the auto show were the new car models, and a wide variety of motorbikes in the 250cc to 500cc range.

=== 2019 ===
Pakistan Auto Show 2019 was held at Karachi Expo Center from April 12 to 15. The PAPS 2019 event welcomed new entrants by providing them with a platform to show their mettle in order to make the auto industry more competitive. Stalls of 244 exhibitors, including 89 local and 106 international companies were present at the event. Three universities also took part in the event while procurement departments of Pakistan Railways, Pakistan International Airlines (PIA) and Pakistan Army were invited to assess the quality of locally manufactured products. Exhibitors from Thailand, China, Japan, Malaysia, Korea and the Netherlands participated in the event.

==== Highlights ====
- Pak Suzuki unveiled Alto 660cc at PAPS 2019 which is Pakistan's first locally produced 660cc engine capacity vehicle.
- During the PAPS 2019, Honda Atlas introduced Honda Sensing — a feature that helps you learn driving virtually. Alongside this, the newly launched Honda Civic X Facelift and Civic Facelift RS Turbo were also displayed.
- Kia Motors brought several surprise packages at PAPS 2019. These include Kia Stinger, Kia Picanto, Kia Sportage, Kia Carnival and Kia Niro. It was announced that Kia Sportage and Kia Picanto will be available in August and October, respectively.
- Changan Motors also displayed its offerings for the Pakistani market — including 800 and CX70T — at the PAPS 2019. Master Motors Ltd (MML) announced during the PAPS 2019 that three of their vehicles – Changan M-8, Changan M-9 and Changan Karvaan – will be locally assembled and rolled out later.
- Over 70 Chinese companies had participated and exhibited their products.

== Attendance ==
Year	Exhibitors	Visitors
2018	112	300,000
2017	192	140,000
2016	104	45,000
2015	—N/a	30,000
2014	—N/a	25,000
2013	—N/a	15,000
