= Fleetwood Country Cruize-In =

Coordinates: 42.9475°N 81.3676°W

Fleetwood Country Cruize-In is one of North America's largest outdoor carshows. The car show takes place in London, Ontario at a private estate owned by Steve Plunkett, a local philanthropist and classic car junkie.

Fleetwood Country Cruize-In has had several celebrity appearances a part of the event; including, Adam West and Julie Newmar arriving on the Batcopter, an American Graffiti reunion, George Barris - a notable auto customizer, Lou Christie, Tommy James and the Shondells, Martha Reeves and the Vandellas, Little Anthony and the Imperials, Peter Noone, Frankie Avalon, Bobby Rydell, and more.

The car show was also featured on 'Car Crazy' in 2009, hosted by Barry Meguiar.
