= Truckfest =

Transport festival in the United Kingdom

- Truckfest logo
- Genre: Trucks, Music, Entertainment
- Dates: 5–6 May (Peterborough); 17–18 Aug (South East); 5–6 Oct (Original)
- Locations: Peterborough, United Kingdom
- Years active: 1983–present
- Founders: Live Promotions Events Ltd
- Most recent: 17–18 Aug 2021 (South East)
- Next event: 17–18 Aug 2022 (South East)
- Organiser: Live Promotions Events Ltd
- Sponsor: Motortransport
- Website: www.truckfest.co.uk

Truckfest is a transport festival in the United Kingdom centred on trucks and the haulage industry. As well as trade stands and music entertainment, highlights of the shows are displays of customised trucks and monster trucks.

== Overview ==
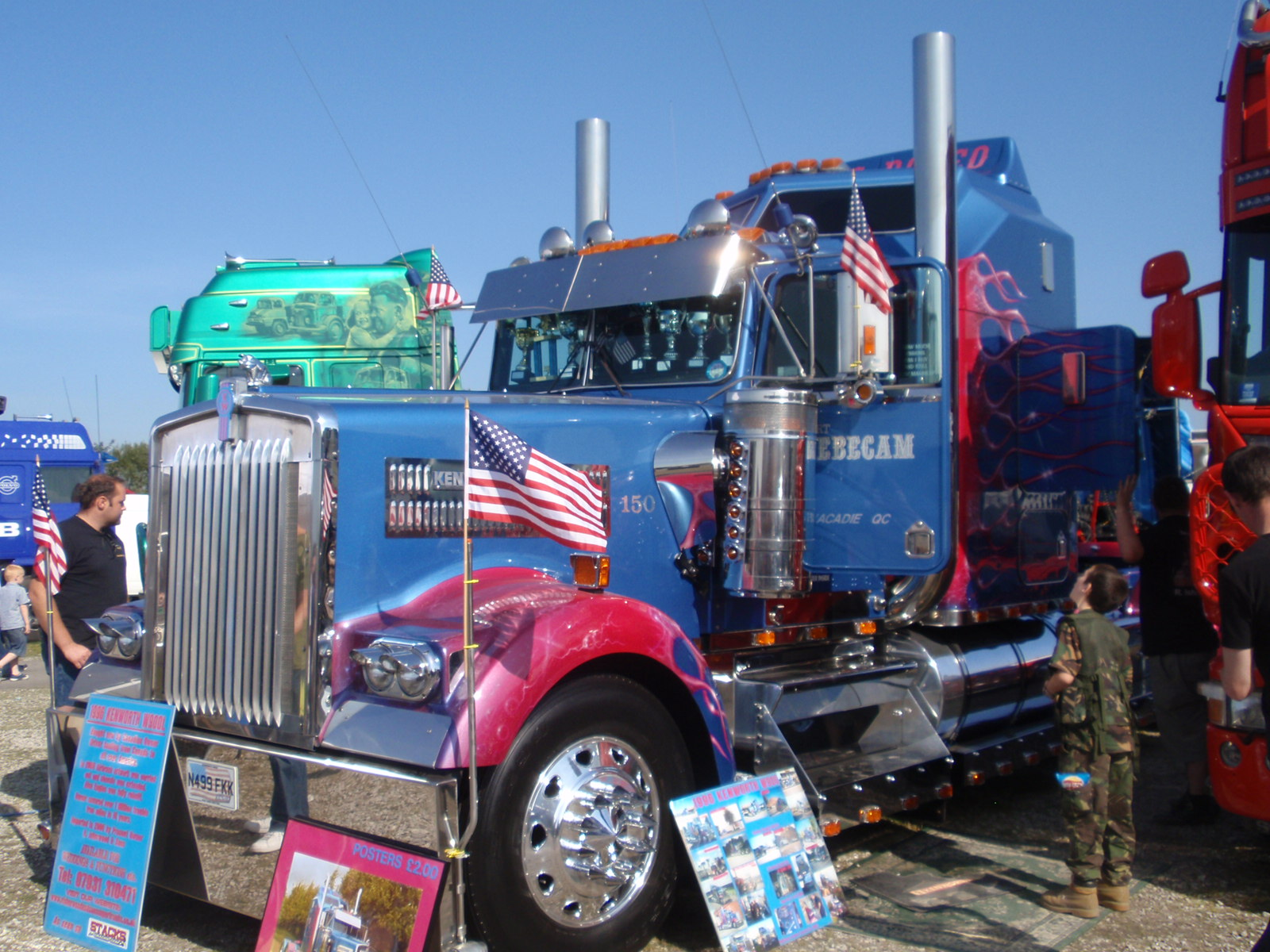
decorated truck, Truckfest at Haydock Park racecourse, 12 September 2009

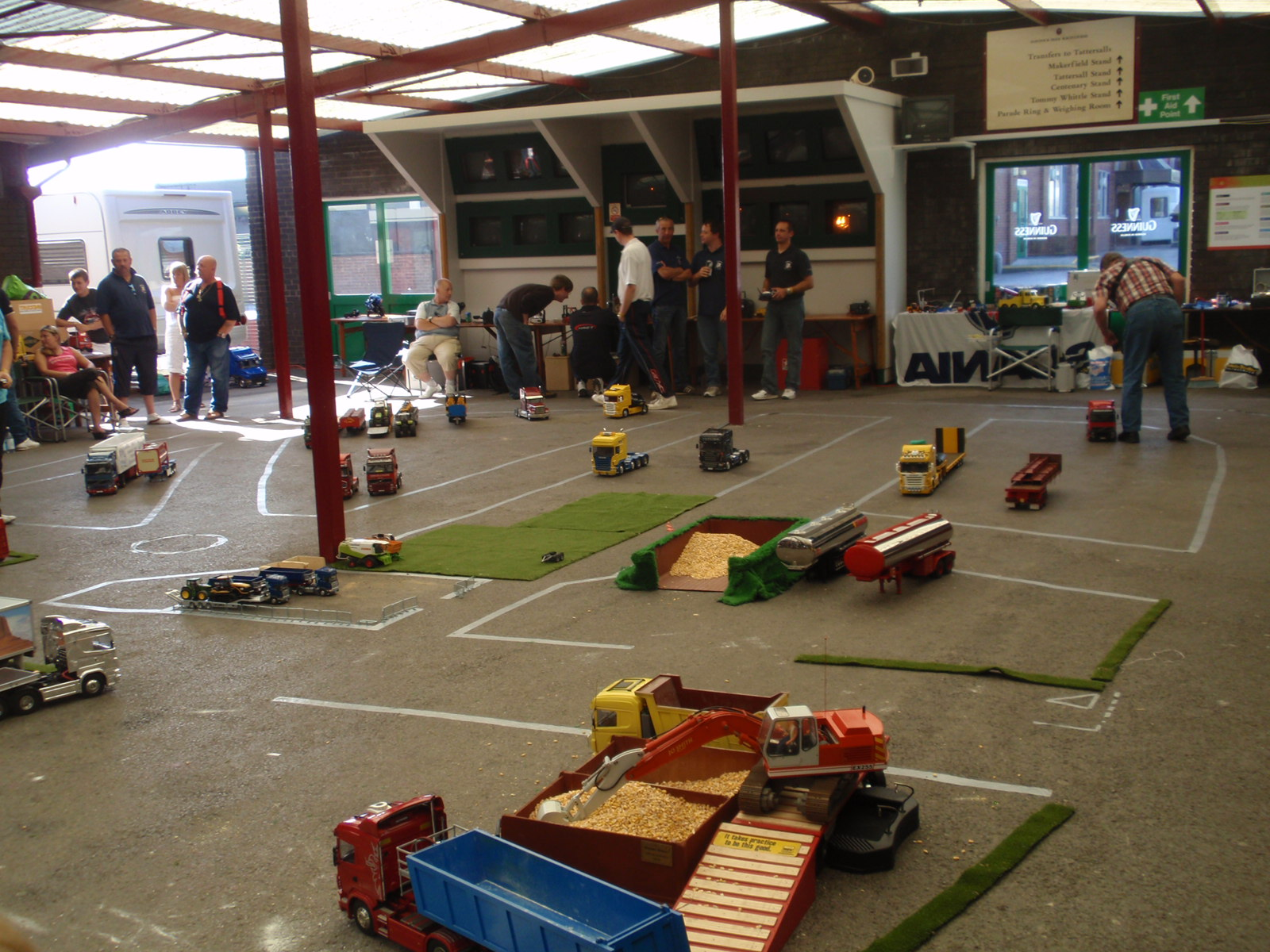
Radio-controlled model trucks, Truckfest at Haydock Park racecourse, England, 12 September 2009

The main Truckfest event is held in Peterborough at the East of England Showground, and is billed as the biggest get-together in the lorry-driving calendar. The Peterborough event celebrated its silver (25th) anniversary in 2007.

The 2016 event was held at Peterborough on 1–2 May. A Truckfest event was held on 8–9 September 2021 at Newark Showground.

Other Truckfest events are held at Haydock Park in the northwest, the Royal Highland Centre in Scotland, the Royal Bath and West Showground in the southwest, Kent Showground in the southeast and Croft Circuit in the northeast.

== See also ==
- List of auto shows and motor shows by continent
- List of festivals in the United Kingdom
