= Nashville International Auto Show =

Coordinates: 36.157°N 86.778°W

The Nashville International Auto Show occurs each year at the Music City Center in Nashville, Tennessee. It is part of the regular circuit of auto shows in the United States, and most major manufacturers exhibit there. Firms with assembly facilities in the Middle Tennessee area, such as Nissan and Saturn are particularly well represented.

Groups of historic and special-interest cars sometimes appear on the premises to coincide with the main show; an exhibit of classic Mustangs was on display in 2004. In 2003, the date of the show was shifted from December to January, from the end to the beginning of the show year, in order to secure more favorable consideration from exhibitors for the introduction of new production and concept vehicles. The date has since changed several times. Currently, as of 2024, the show is held in the fall.

The Music City Center site is located downtown, with ready access to transportation and lodging, and is connected to the neighboring Bridgestone Arena. Prior to the organization of the current show in 1999, other similar events, usually sponsored by dealer organizations, had been held for a number of years at the Nashville Municipal Auditorium. A feature of all auto shows in Tennessee, mandated by state law, is that no sales may take place on the premises, and signs to that effect must be posted.

The auto show was previously known as the Nashville International Auto and Truck Show. It was not held in 2020 due to the COVID-19 pandemic.
