= Athens International Motor Show =

Defunct auto show in Greece

Athens International Motor Show is a biennial auto show held in the Greek capital, Athens. It was first held in 1995 and features on the Organisation Internationale des Constructeurs d'Automobiles' calendar of events.

In 2009, the 8th edition of the fair was held in November, on the east wing of the defunct Ellinikon International Airport. The last edition in 2007 was attended by approximately 250,000 visitors.
