= Volkswagen Fox =

Subcompact car produced by Volkswagen of Brazil (2003–2021)

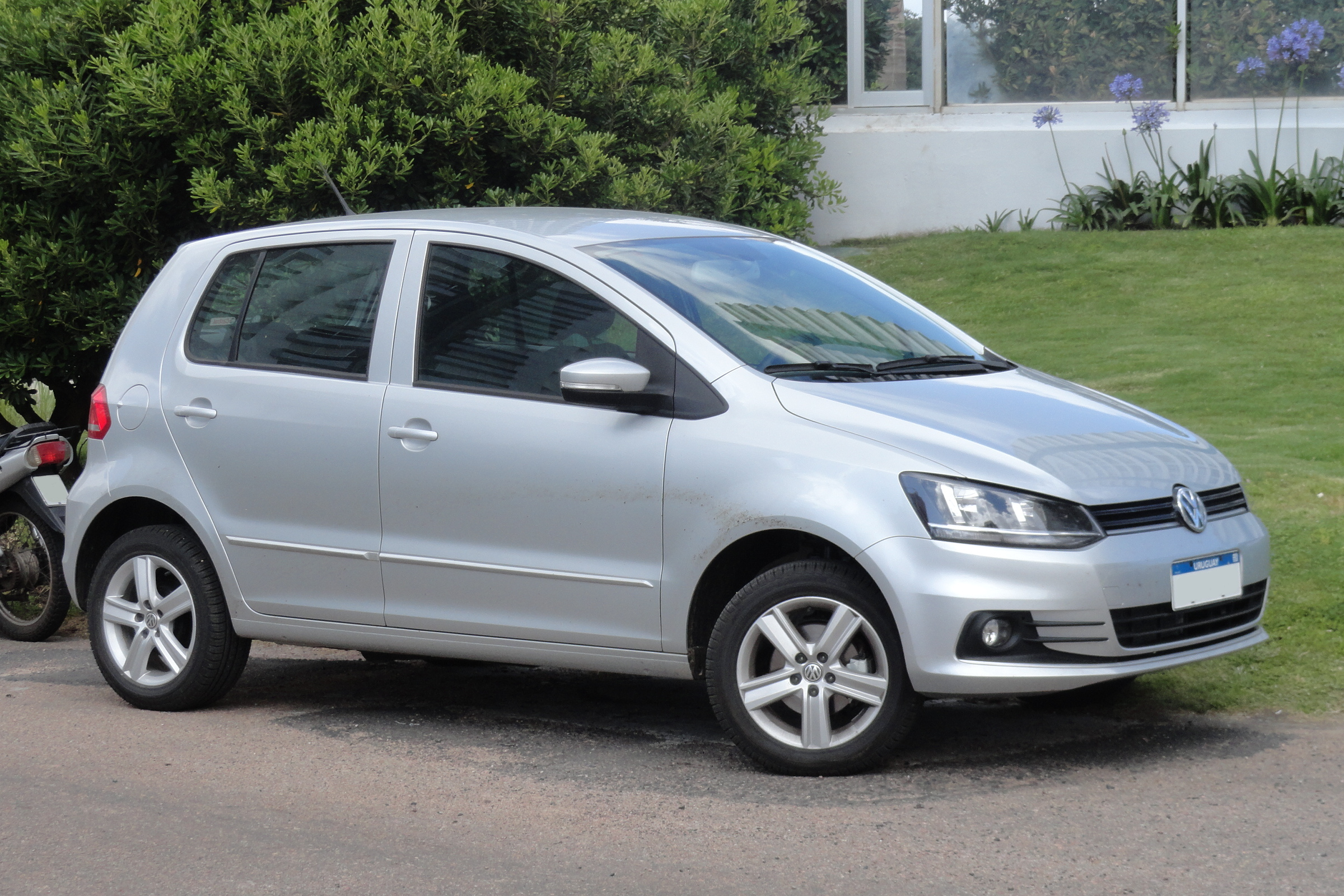

Overview
- Manufacturer: Volkswagen
- Also called: Volkswagen Lupo (Mexico); Volkswagen Suran (Argentina); Volkswagen SpaceFox (Brazil); Volkswagen CrossFox; Volkswagen SpaceCross; Volkswagen SportVan; Volkswagen Urban Fox
- Production: 2003–2021; 2005–2011 (Europe); 2006–2018 (SpaceFox, SpaceCross and SportVan); 2006–2019 (Suran, Argentina)
- Assembly: Brazil: São Bernardo do Campo, São Paulo; (Note: European version.) São José dos Pinhais, Paraná (Note: For Latin America.); Argentina: General Pacheco, Buenos Aires Province (Note: for Volkswagen Suran.)

Body and chassis
- Class: Subcompact car
- Body style: 3-door hatchback 5-door hatchback 5-door estate (Suran)
- Layout: Front-engine, front-wheel-drive
- Platform: Volkswagen Group PQ24 platform
- Related: Volkswagen Polo IV

Powertrain
- Engine: 1.2 L I3 (petrol); 1.4 L I4 (petrol); 1.6 L I4 (petrol); 1.0 L I4 (petrol/ethanol); 1.6 L I4 (petrol/ethanol); 1.4 L I3 (diesel)
- Transmission: 5-speed manual 5-speed ASG

Dimensions
- Wheelbase: 2,465 mm (97.0 in)
- Length: 2005–08: 3,805 mm (149.8 in); 2009–2021: 3,823 mm (150.5 in)
- Width: 1,640 mm (64.6 in)
- Height: 1,545 mm (60.8 in)

Chronology
- Predecessor: Volkswagen Lupo (Europe)
- Successor: Volkswagen up! (Europe); Volkswagen Polo (South America)

The Volkswagen Fox is a subcompact car produced and designed by Volkswagen of Brazil and sold in Latin America from 2003 until 2021 and in Europe from 2005 until 2011, where it was sold as the city car offering. The Fox was produced as a 3-door and 5-door hatchback. There is also a mini SUV version called Fox Xtreme (previously CrossFox) and a mini MPV/station wagon model called Suran, SpaceFox, SportVan or Fox Plus depending on the market.

== Earlier use of the nameplate ==
Volkswagen acquired the rights to the name in 1969, by purchasing NSU. The original NSU Fox was a motorbike first seen in 1949, and Volkswagen had subsequently used the "Fox" name in some markets for special edition Volkswagen Polos. The Audi 80 produced in the 1970s also used the name Fox on vehicles sold in Australia and the United States. The Australian version was assembled locally by Volkswagen Australasia Ltd.

=== North America (1987–1993) ===
The Fox was a variant of the Voyage manufactured by Volkswagen do Brasil and marketed by Volkswagen in North America as an entry-level subcompact from 1987 until 1993 — VW's response to an expanding market for entry-level subcompacts, such as the Yugo and the Hyundai Excel. Initially offered as a 2-door and 4-door sedan as well as a 2-door wagon, the wagon was discontinued in 1991 along with the 2-door for the Canadian market, the same year the 4-door sedan (as well as the 2-door, in the United States) received a mild restyling.

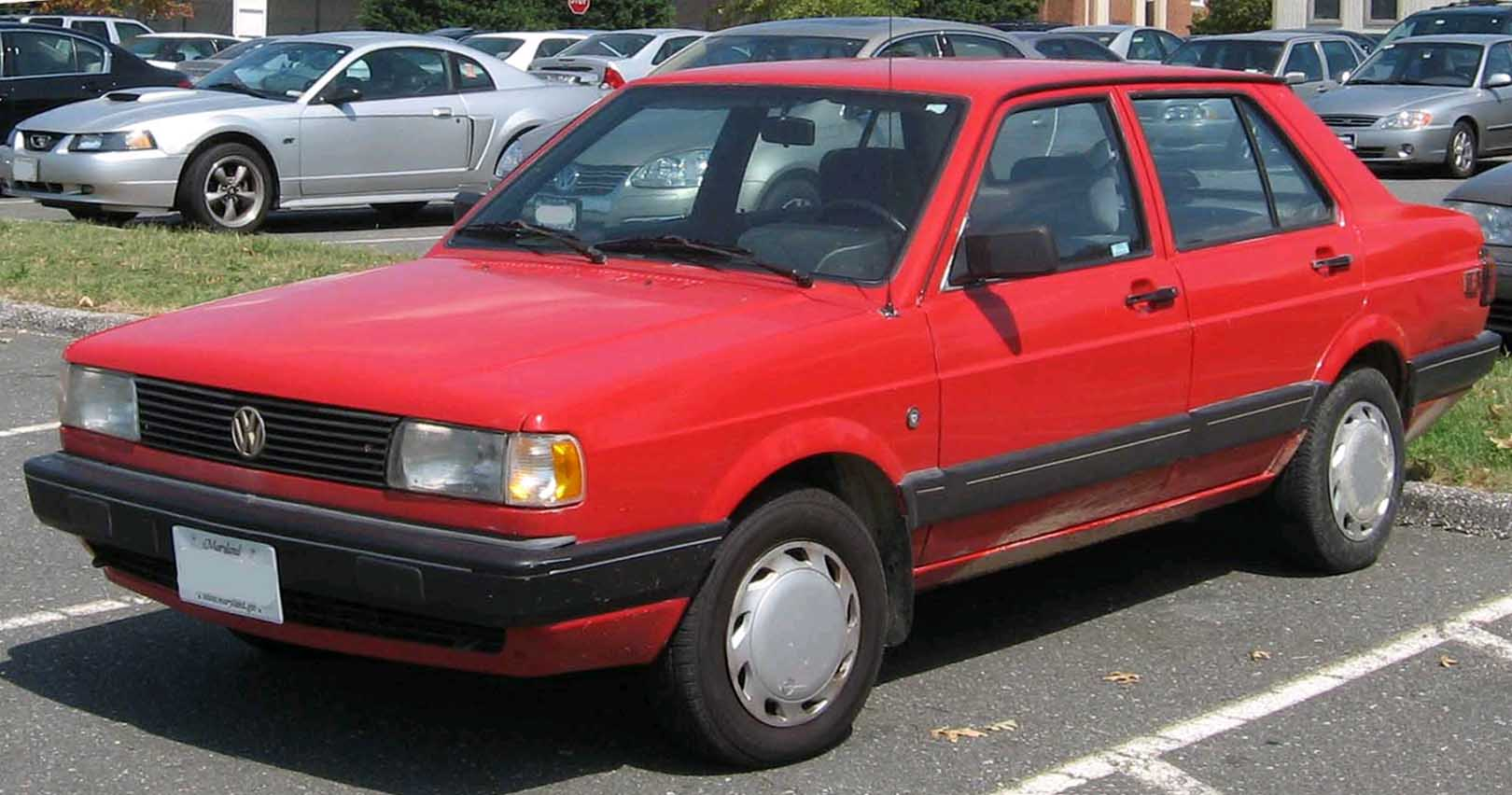
North American market Volkswagen Fox GL 4-door sedan

The Fox featured a longitudinal mounted 1.8L, 81 PS (60 kW; 80 hp) 4-cylinder petrol engine, sharing components with the Volkswagen Golf — along with a 4-speed manual transmission for the standard 2-door and 4-door sedan and a 5-speed manual transmission for the "GL" sport model. — An automatic transmission was not offered, nor was power steering or anti-lock braking. The Fox had power assisted disk brakes in the front and drums in the rear.

According to the U.S. EPA, the 4-speed manual transmission averaged 24 mpg_{‑US} (9.8 L/100 km; 29 mpg_{‑imp}) on the new combined driving cycle with the 5-speed manual transmission able to produce 23 mpg_{‑US} (10 L/100 km; 28 mpg_{‑imp}) on the new driving cycle. Under the old test protocol, the Volkswagen Fox was able to produce 26 mpg_{‑US} (9.0 L/100 km; 31 mpg_{‑imp}) with the 5-speed transmission and 27 mpg_{‑US} (8.7 L/100 km; 32 mpg_{‑imp}) with the 4-speed transmission.

Early models (1987–1989) featured the Bosch CIS-E also known as KE-Jetronic electro mechanical fuel injection, using an oxygen sensor to assist in fuel management. Later models featured (1990–1993) Bosch Digifant electronic fuel injection. In Canada, the Fox from 1987 to 1989 was offered with the simpler Bosch CIS fuel injection (K-Jetronic) without an oxygen sensor for the engine fuel management system.

Due partly to booming sales of the Passat, Jetta, Golf and the price of the Fox compared to its competition, sales dwindled, particularly the facelifted (1990–1993) models. Volkswagen also priced the car very low, to compensate for the ever more expensive German-made cars, and Volkswagen of America lost money on every Fox sold in the early years.

Originally, the Fox's squared off front end featured sealed beam halogen headlamps; after 1991 models received revised sheet metal with flush glass headlamps (MK2).

=== South Africa ===
In South Africa, the Fox name was used for a model based on the first generation Jetta. This was sold alongside the Volkswagen Citi Golf, based on the first generation Golf.

== Overview ==
=== Latin America ===
In Latin America, the Fox was positioned between Volkswagen's supermini models, the low cost Gol and the Polo. It was based on the fourth-generation Polo.

In Mexico, it was called the Lupo, due to the last name of then current President Vicente Fox. Volkswagen of Mexico dropped the Lupo after a short run of 2009 models, due to poor sales, and replaced it along with the aged Pointer and Derby by the VW Novo Gol. The SportVan was also quietly discontinued in Mexico in February 2010 due to poor sales, leaving only the CrossFox.

In October 2009, the new 2010 Volkswagen Fox was revealed in Brazil and later also in Argentina. The model was restyled again in 2014.

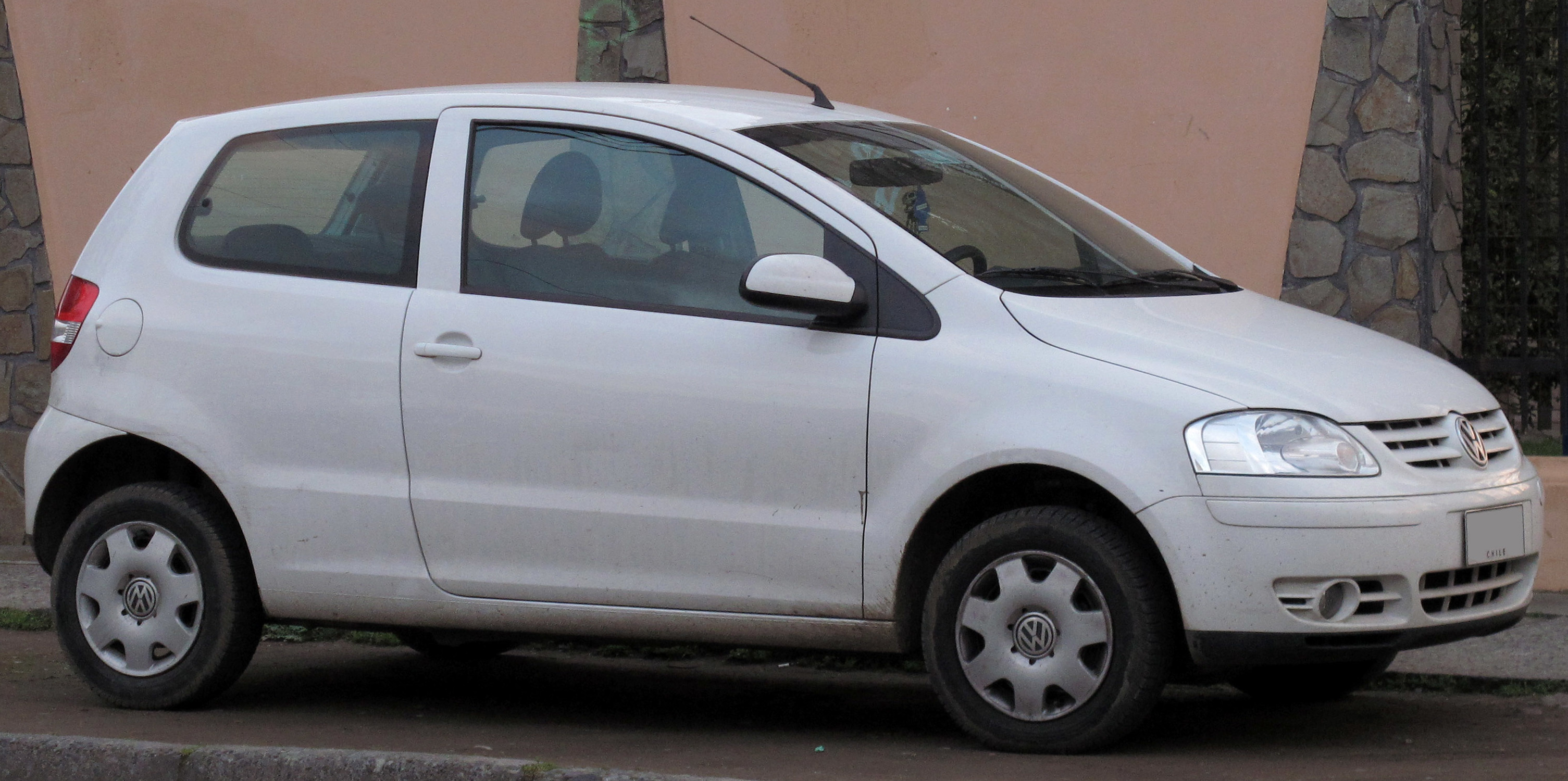
2005 Volkswagen Fox (3-door)

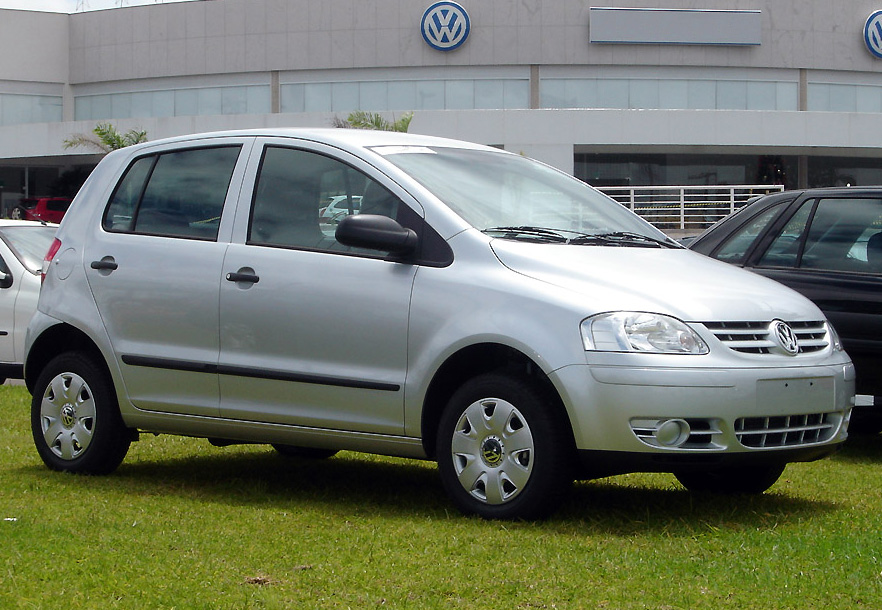
2007 Volkswagen Fox (5-door)

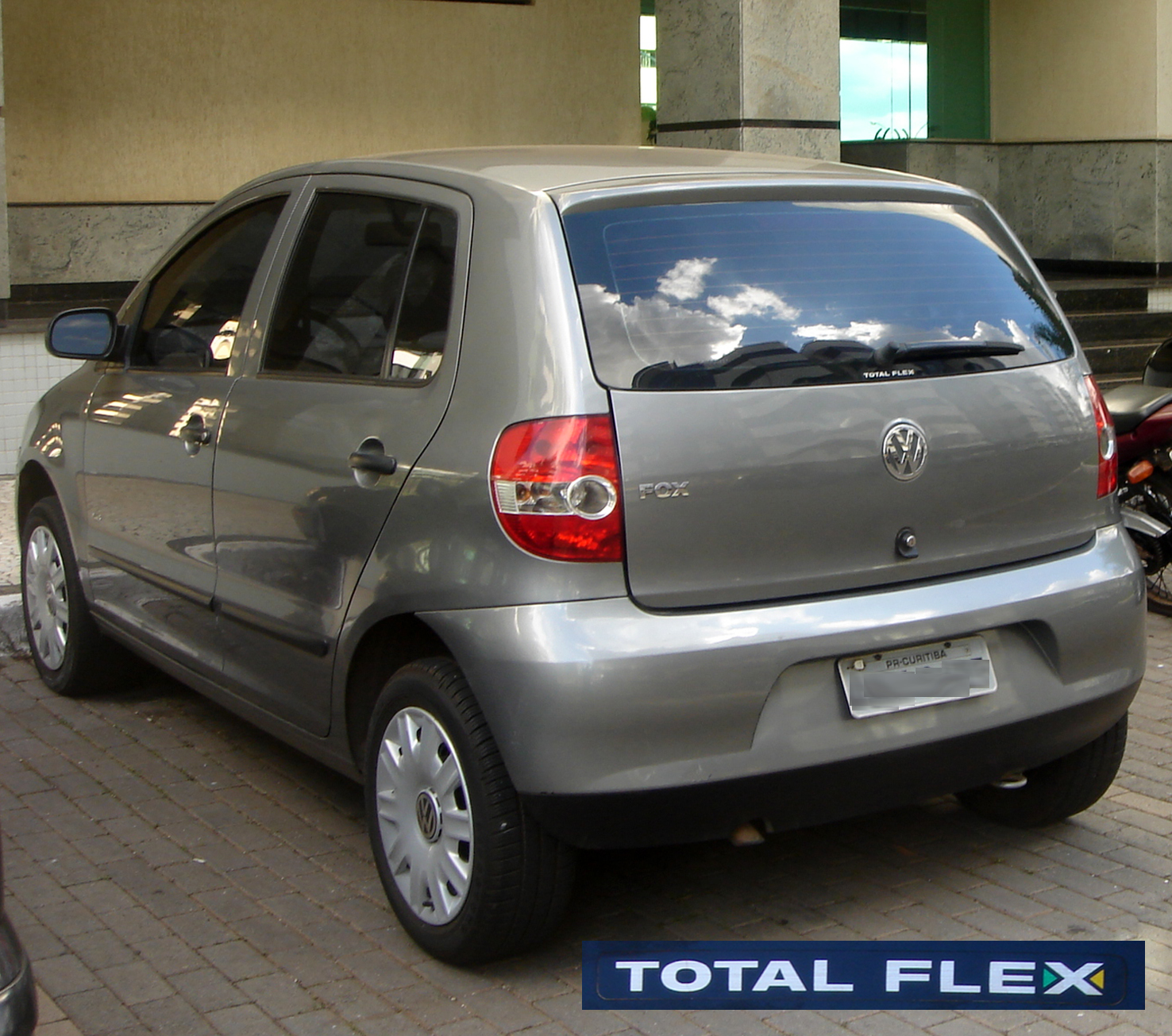
2007 Volkswagen Fox Total Flex (5-door)

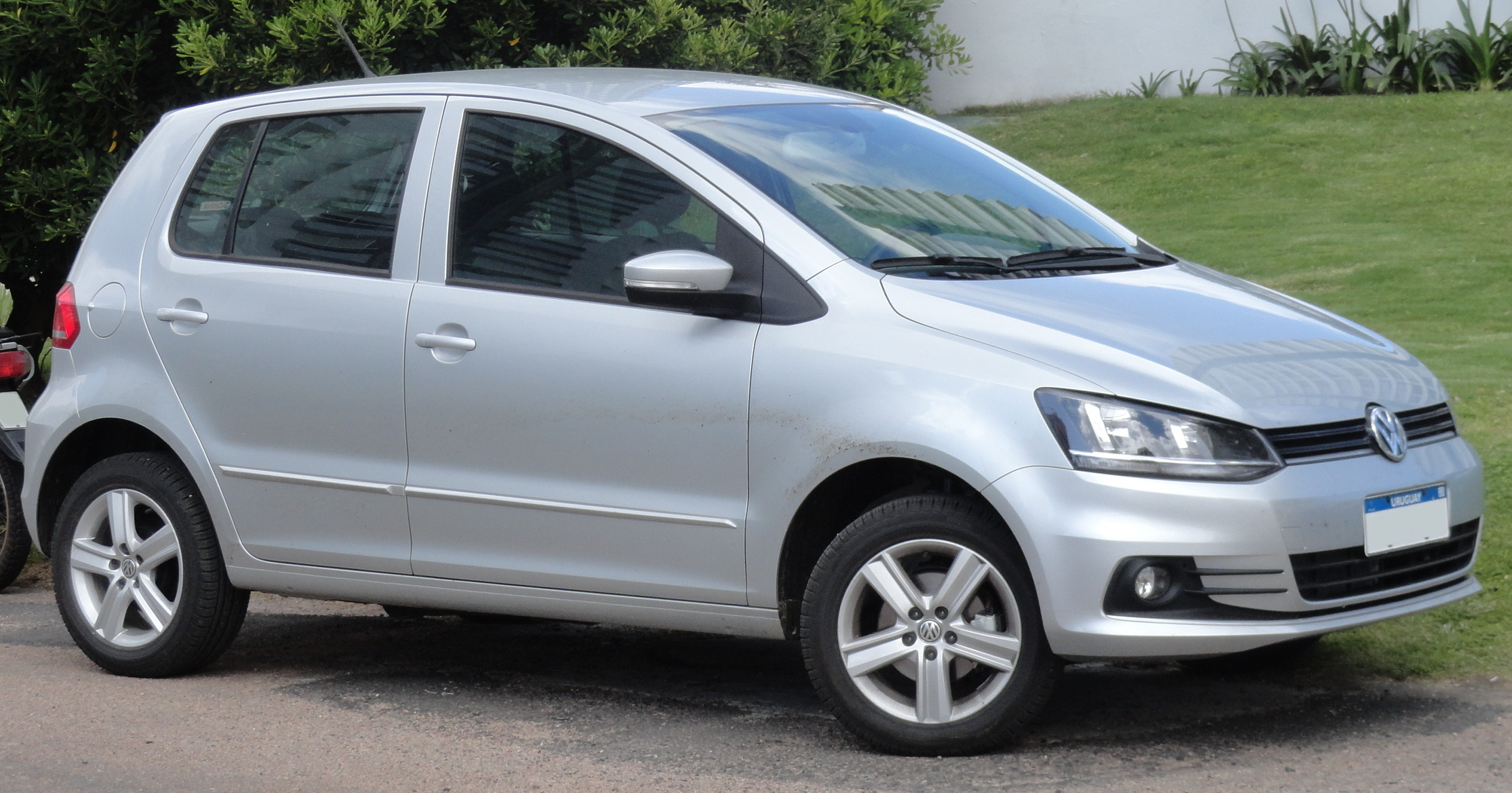
2015 Volkswagen Fox

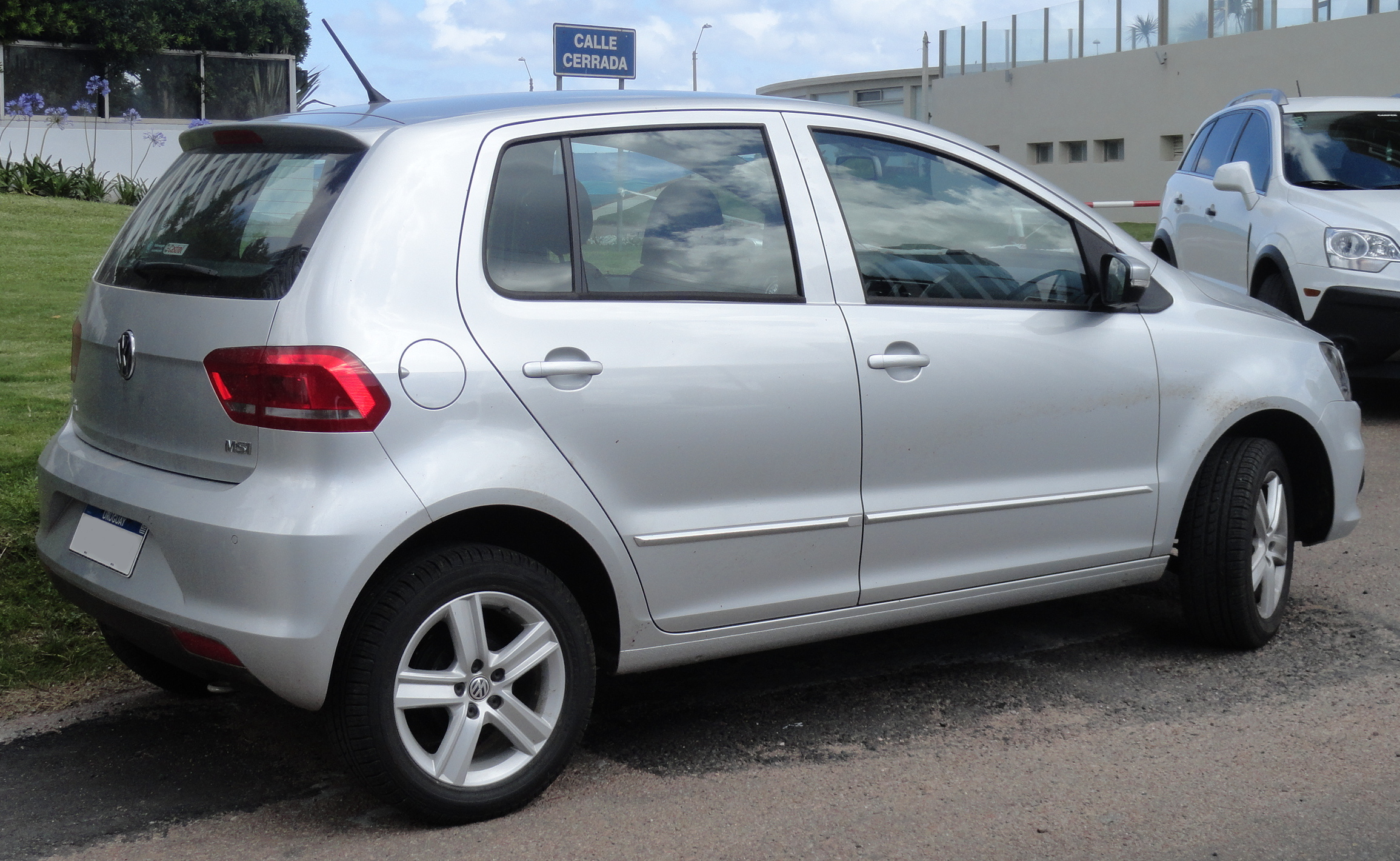
2015 Volkswagen Fox

==== Safety ====
The Fox in its most basic Latin American market configuration received 4 stars for adult occupants and 2 stars for infants from Latin NCAP 1.0 in 2015.

Latin NCAP 1.5 test results Volkswagen Fox + 2 Airbags (2015, similar to Euro NCAP 2002)
Test	Points	Stars
Adult occupant:	11.34/17.0	4 /5 stars
Child occupant:	21.23/49.00	2 /5 stars

=== Europe ===
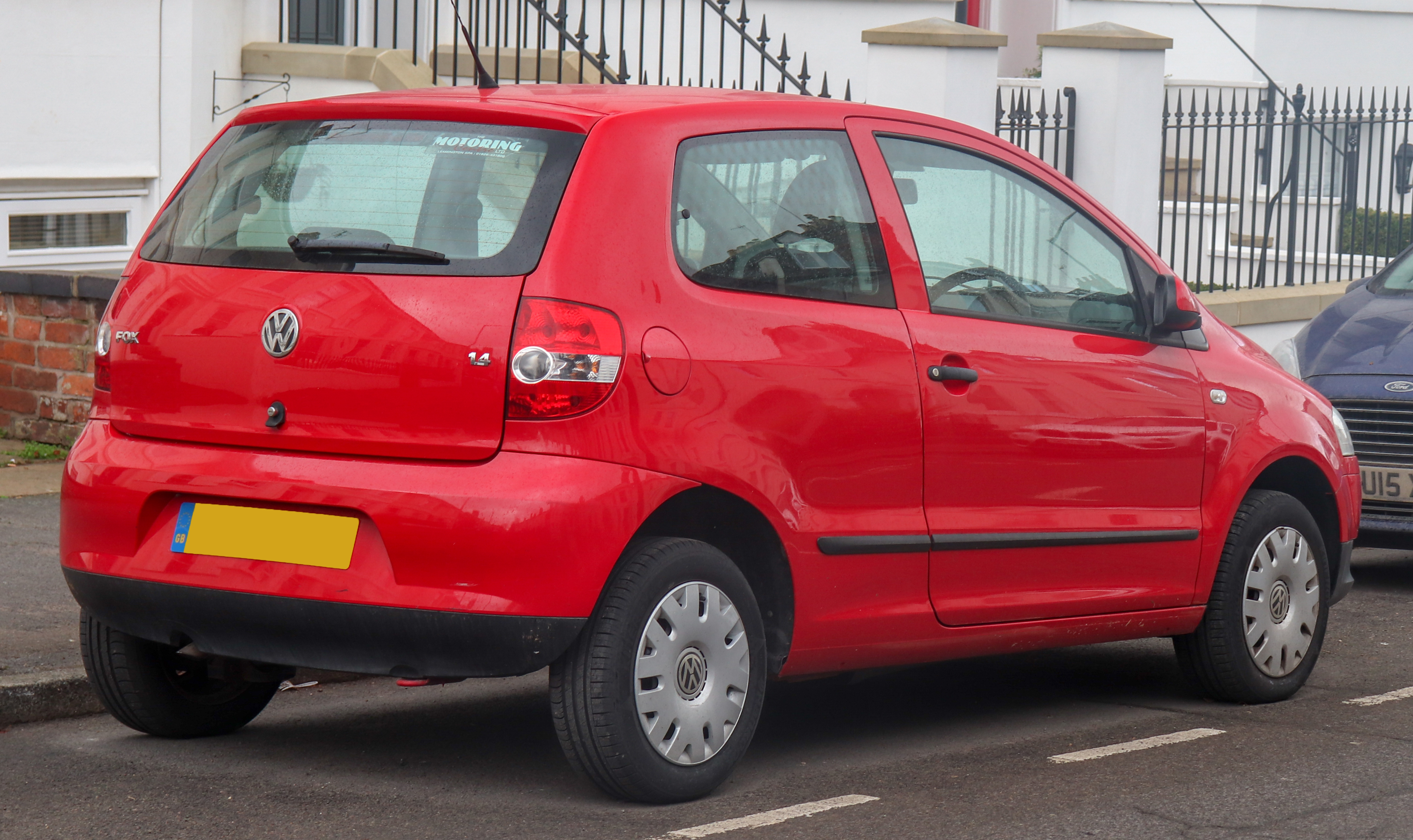
Pre-facelift Volkswagen Fox 1.4

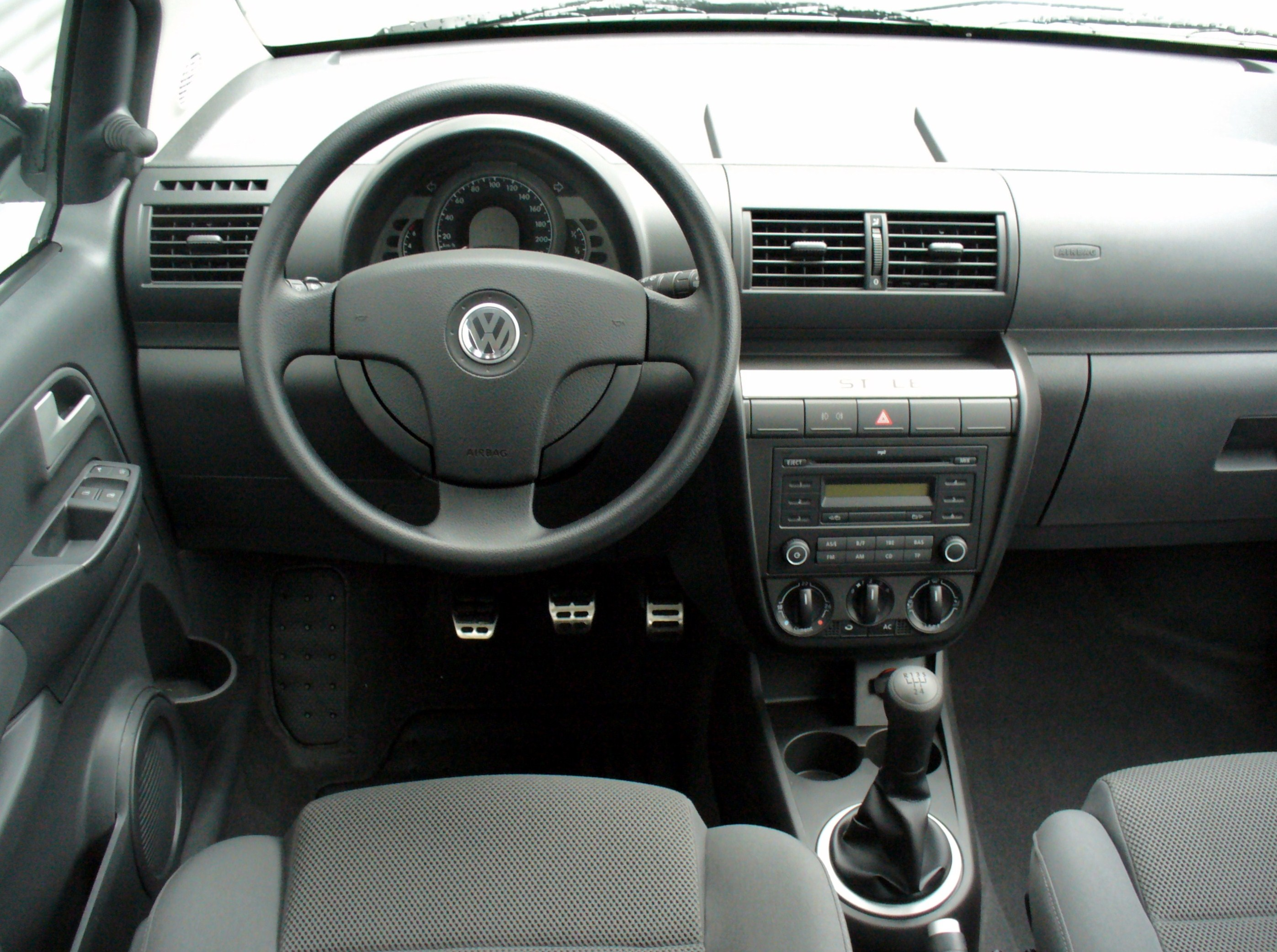
Interior

The Fox was introduced to Europe at the AMI Leipzig Motor Show in April 2005, on debut in Europe, the Fox was only available as a three-door hatchback and with three engine options: the 1.2 L 40 kW (55 hp) I3 and 1.4 L 55 kW (75 hp) I4 petrol engines and the 1.4 L 51 kW (69 hp) TDI engine. The 75 hp engine is all-new, and the two others are inherited from the Polo.

It has a drag coefficient of 0,32.

The Fox was sold with a long options list to reduce its tag price, therefore letting the European customer specify the Fox to their liking. It did come with standard twin airbags and anti-lock braking system for safety measures. Upon its debut, the Fox scored four stars in EuroNCAP's crash rating system.

In the European market, the Fox replaced the Lupo city car as the entry-level car in the lineup. Volkswagen stopped selling the Fox in Europe in 2011 and it was replaced by the Volkswagen Up until it was discontinued in 2023. Like the contemporary Polo, the Fox is based on Volkswagen's PQ24 platform.

==== Specifications ====
Model	Engine	Displacement	Power	Torque
Petrol engines
1.2	I3	1198 cc	56 PS (41 kW; 55 hp) at 4750 rpm	108 N⋅m (80 lb⋅ft) at 3000 rpm
1.4 BKR	I4	1390 cc	76 PS (56 kW; 75 hp) at 5000 rpm	124 N⋅m (91 lb⋅ft) at 2750 rpm
Diesel engines
1.4 TDI	I3	1422 cc	71 PS (52 kW; 70 hp) at 4000 rpm	155 N⋅m (114 lb⋅ft) at 1600–2800 rpm

== Variants ==
=== CrossFox/Fox Xtreme ===
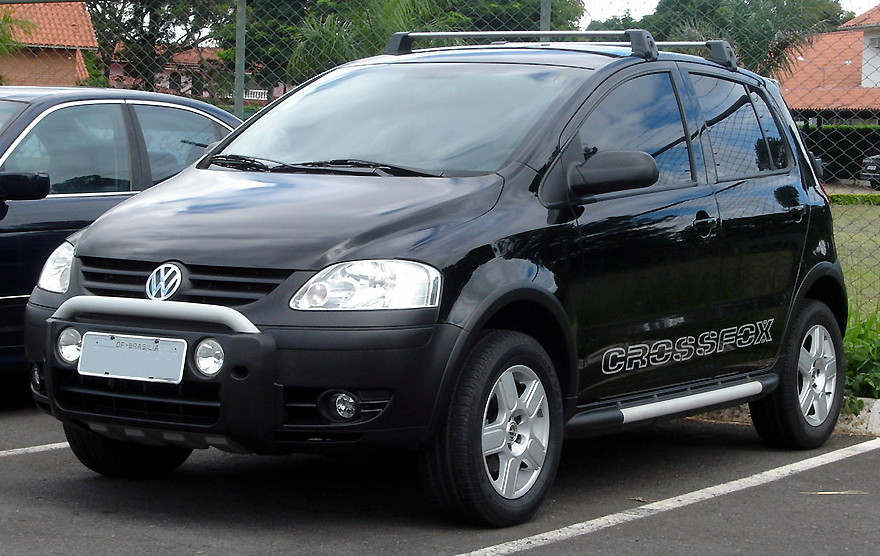
Volkswagen CrossFox

The Volkswagen Fox Xtreme is an adventure version which sets it apart from the standard Fox. Before 2017 it was known as the CrossFox. As is the case for other similar models, it is available only with front-wheel drive.

It is produced in Brazil and sold in Latin American markets; there were plans to export it to European markets to compete in the adventure hatchbacks market (see Toyota Etios Cross and Dacia Sandero Stepway) and Hyundai HB20X.

This version contains mixed-use tires and a suspension raised slightly beyond a spare tire on the outside of the trunk.

=== Suran ===
A mini MPV/station wagon version of the Fox was presented in April 2006. It is named Suran in Argentina, Chile, Egypt, and Uruguay, SpaceFox in Brazil, Ecuador, Bolivia and Peru, SportVan in Mexico and Fox Plus in Algeria. It is built in General Pacheco, Argentina.

Because of its 360 mm-extended tail, it has a larger boot and more rear leg room than the hatchback versions. Its main competitors are the Peugeot 206 SW and Fiat Palio Weekend.

The initial version has the same wheelbase of 2,645 mm (104.1 in), a length of 4,165 mm (164.0 in), a width of 1,655 mm (65.2 in) and a height of 1,545 mm (60.8 in). It uses the 1.6-litre engine, with power output levels ranging between 98 and 103 PS (72 and 76 kW; 97 and 102 bhp), depending on the fuel version (petrol or blend of ethanol and petrol).

In 2010 and 2015, it was facelifted, gaining slightly in overall size: 4,180 mm (164.6 in) in length, 1,660 mm (65.4 in) in width and 1,576 mm (62.0 in) in height. It was discontinued at the beginning of 2019.

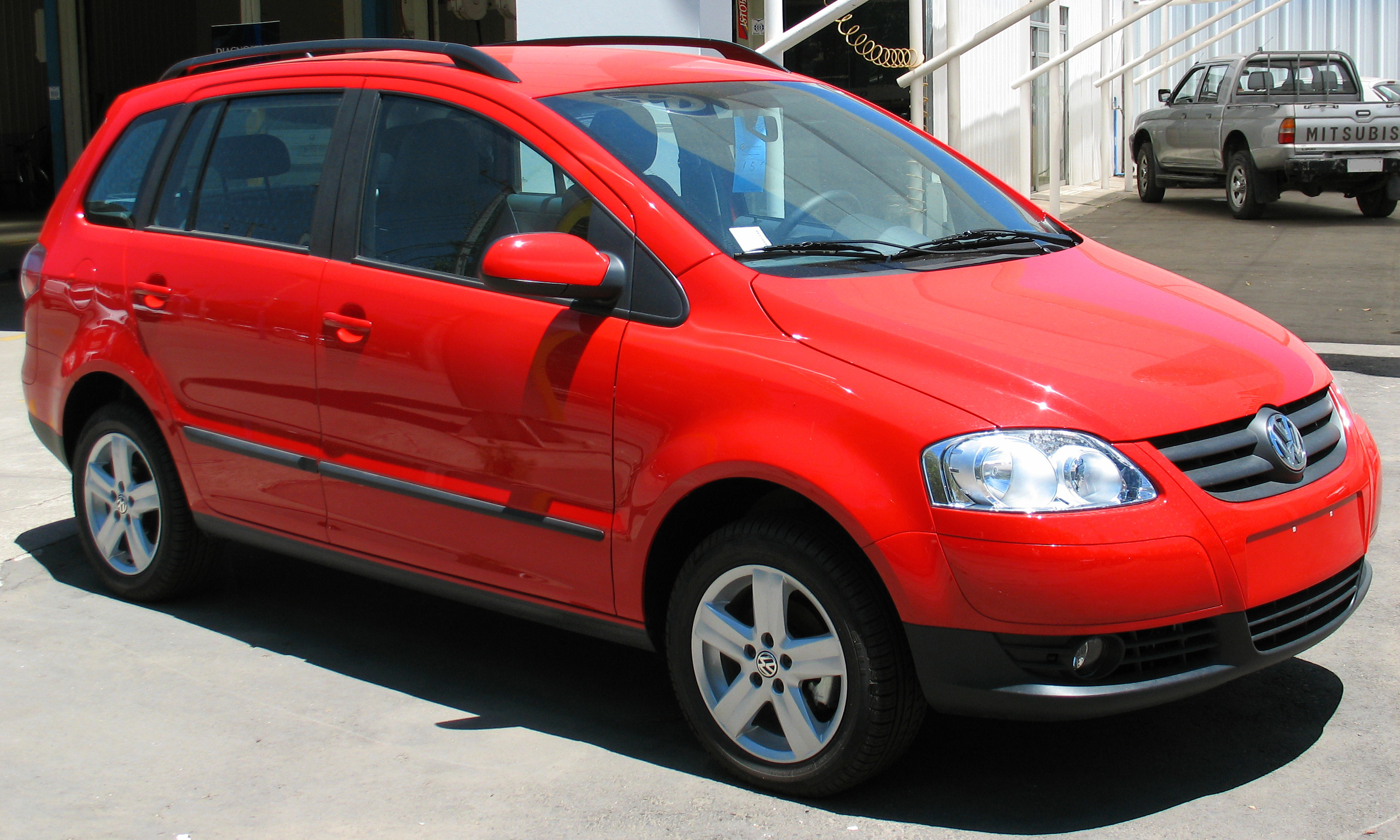
2009 Volkswagen Suran (pre-facelift)

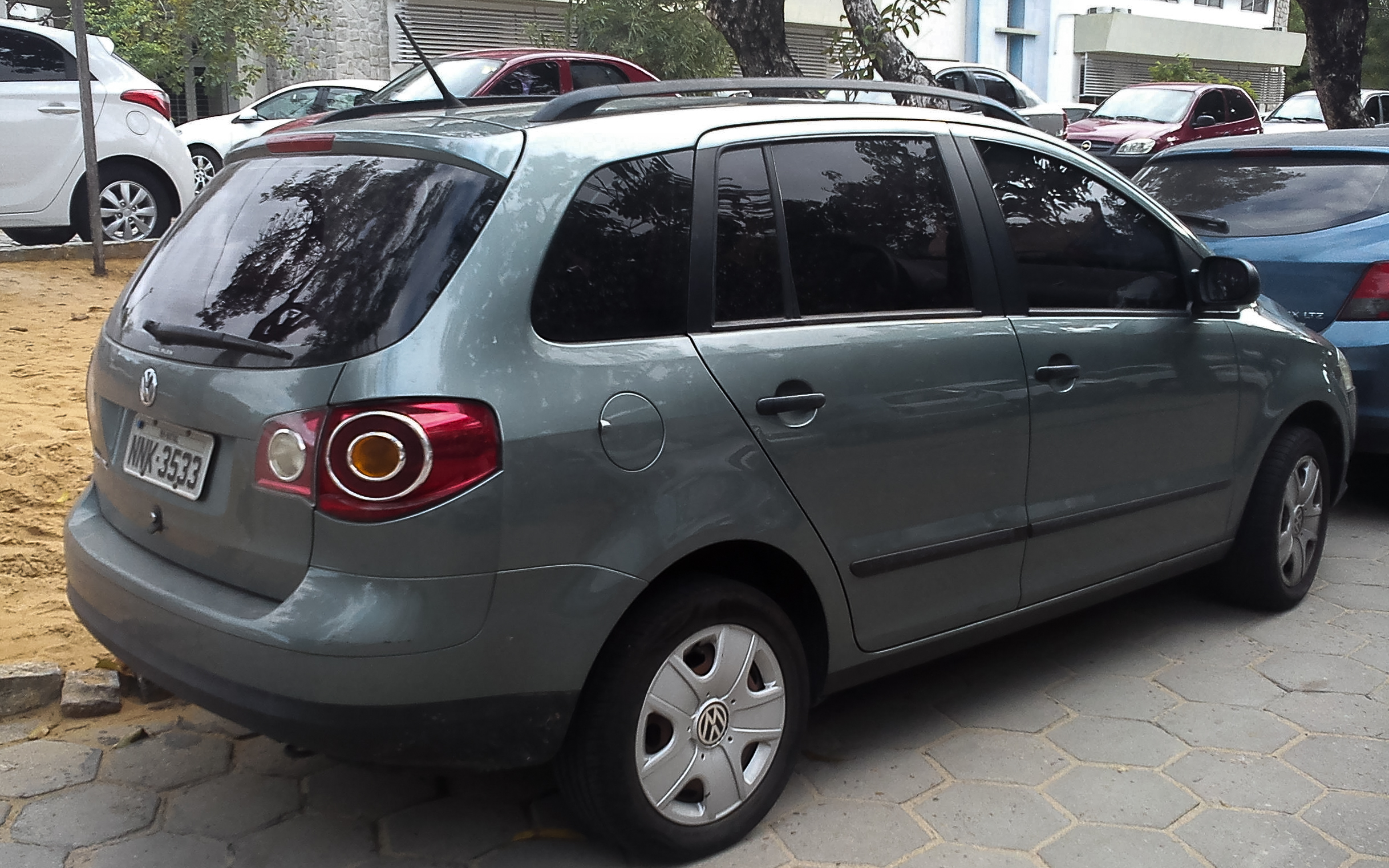
Volkswagen SpaceFox (pre-facelift)

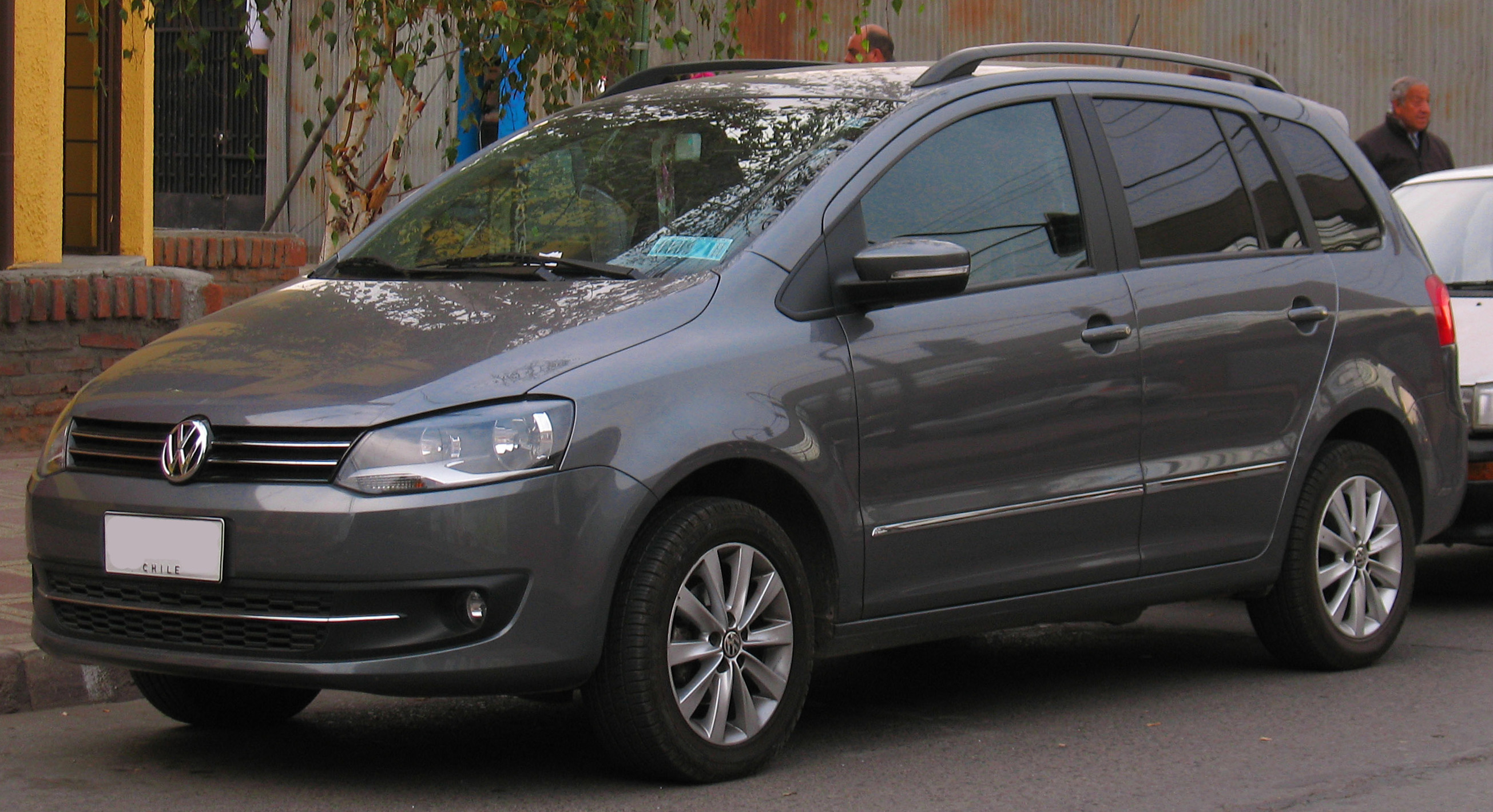
2011 Volkswagen Suran (first facelift)

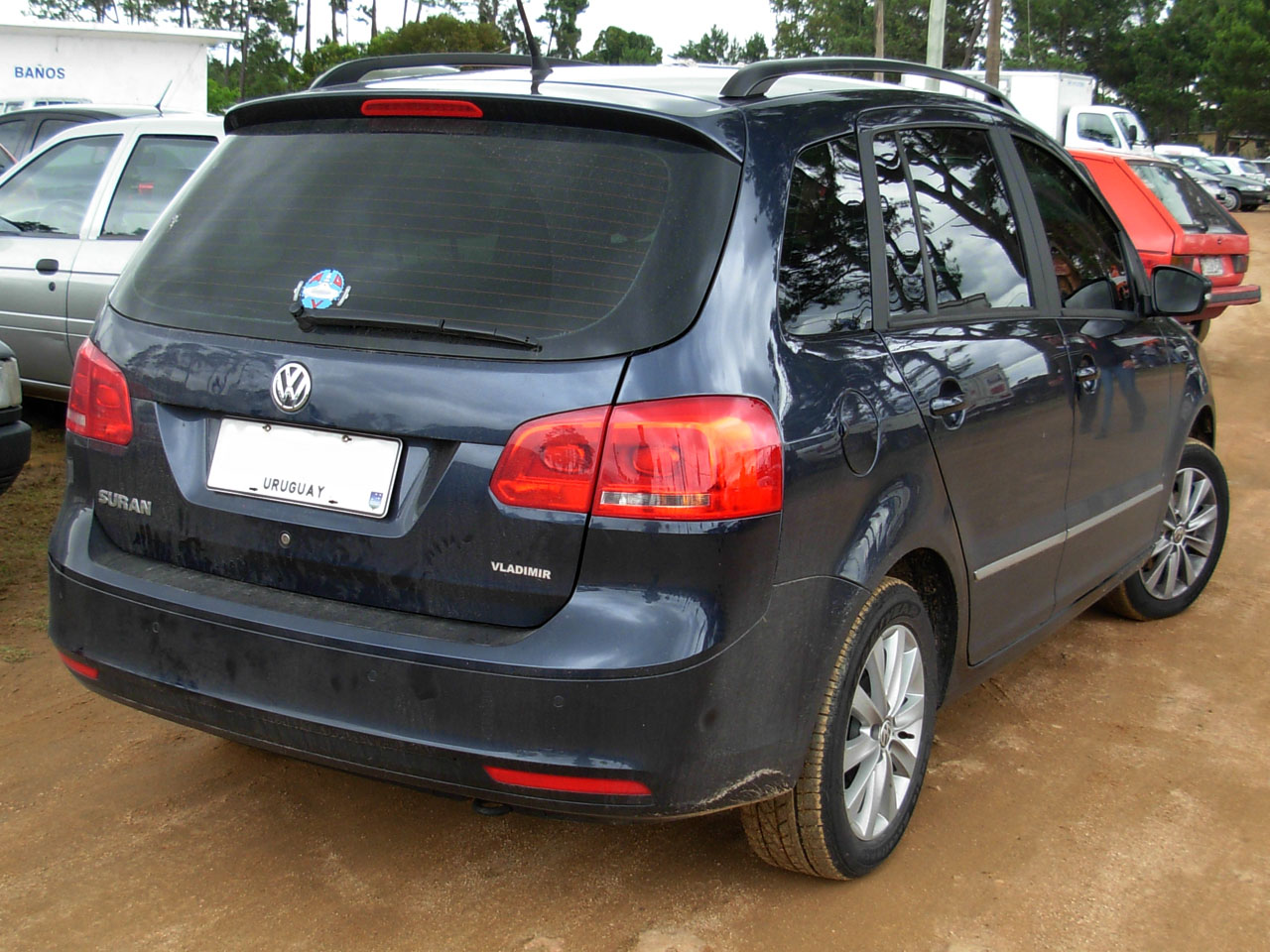
2010 Volkswagen Suran (first facelift)

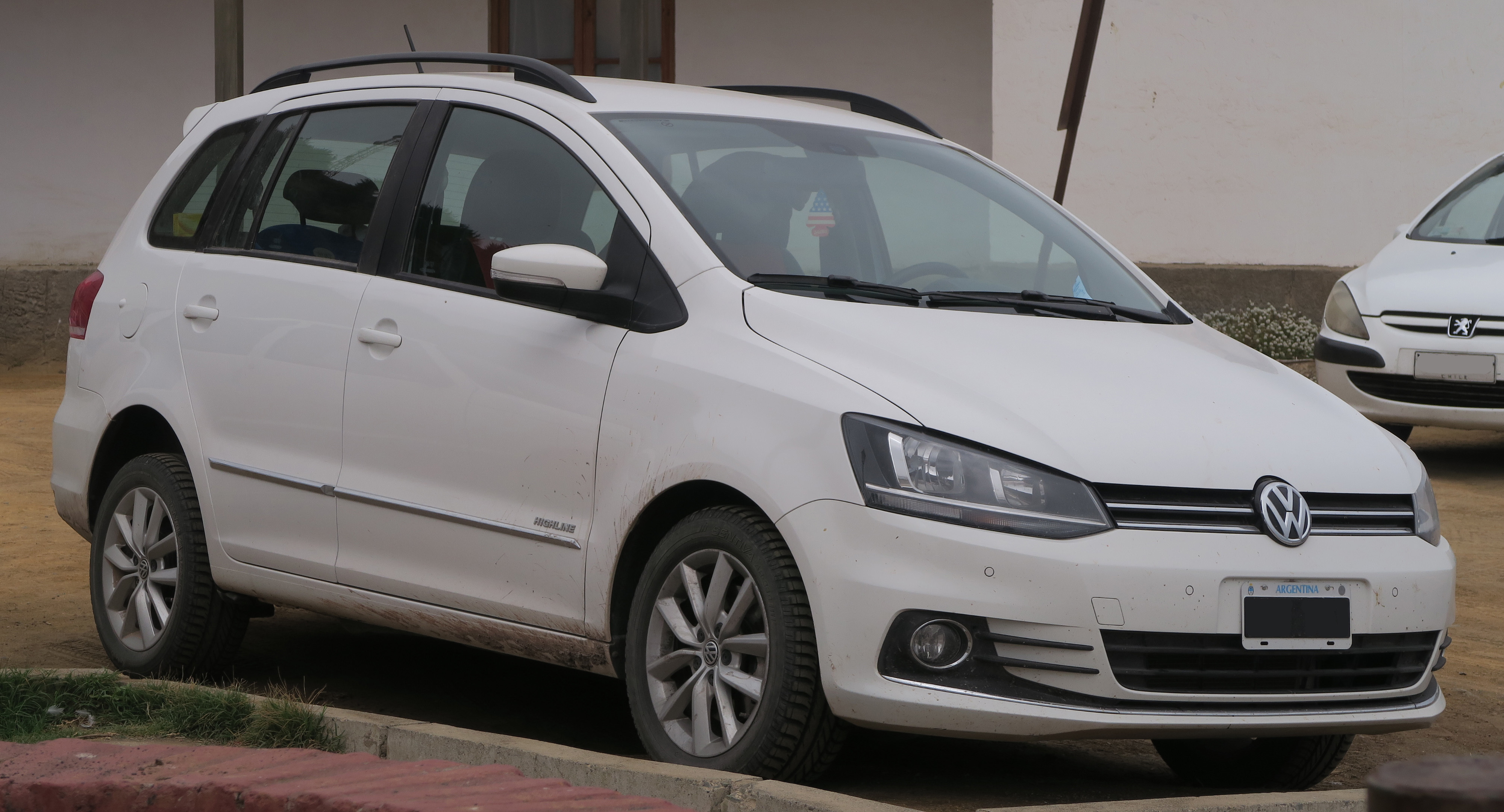
2016 Volkswagen Suran (second facelift)

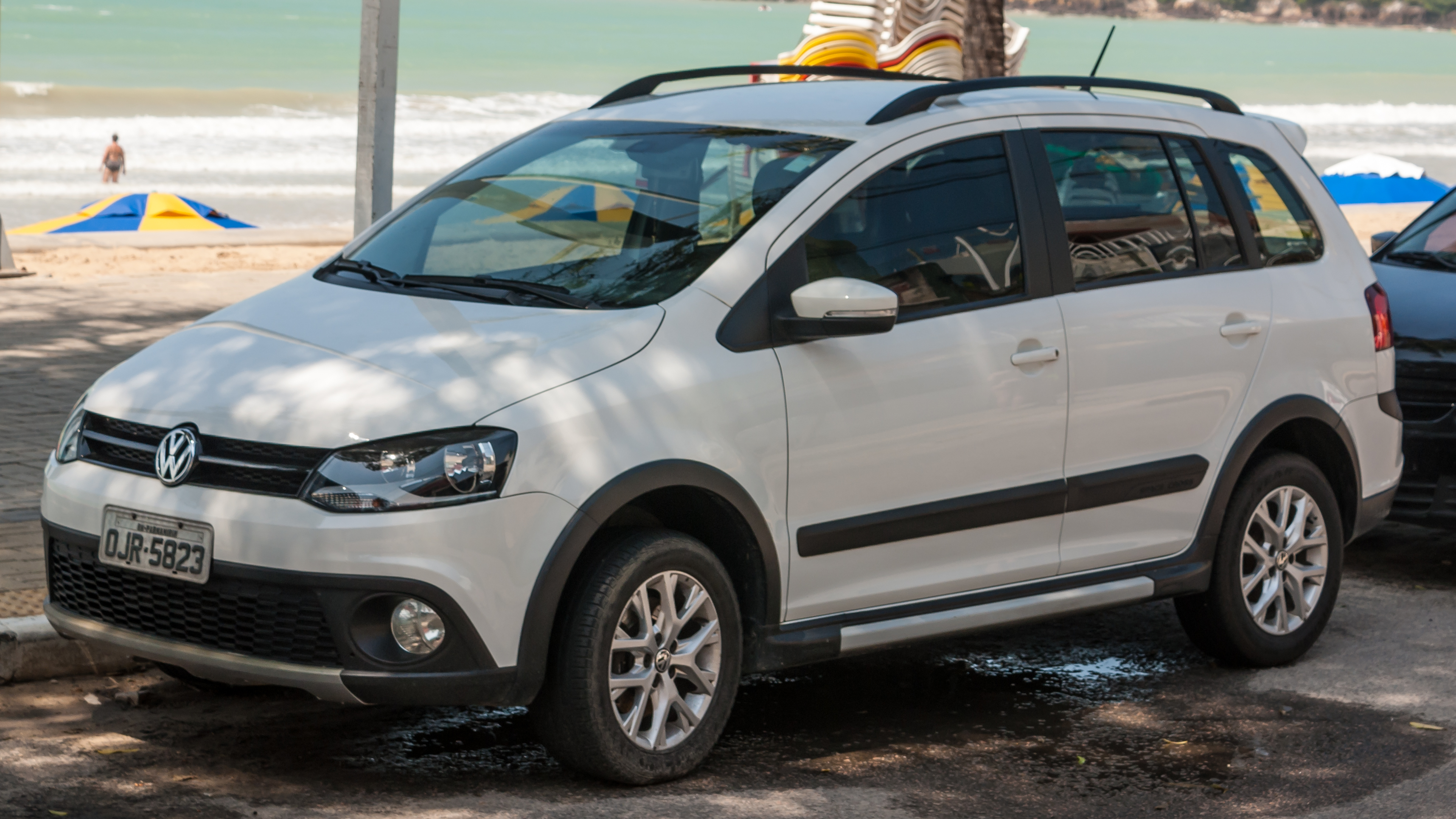
Volkswagen SpaceCross

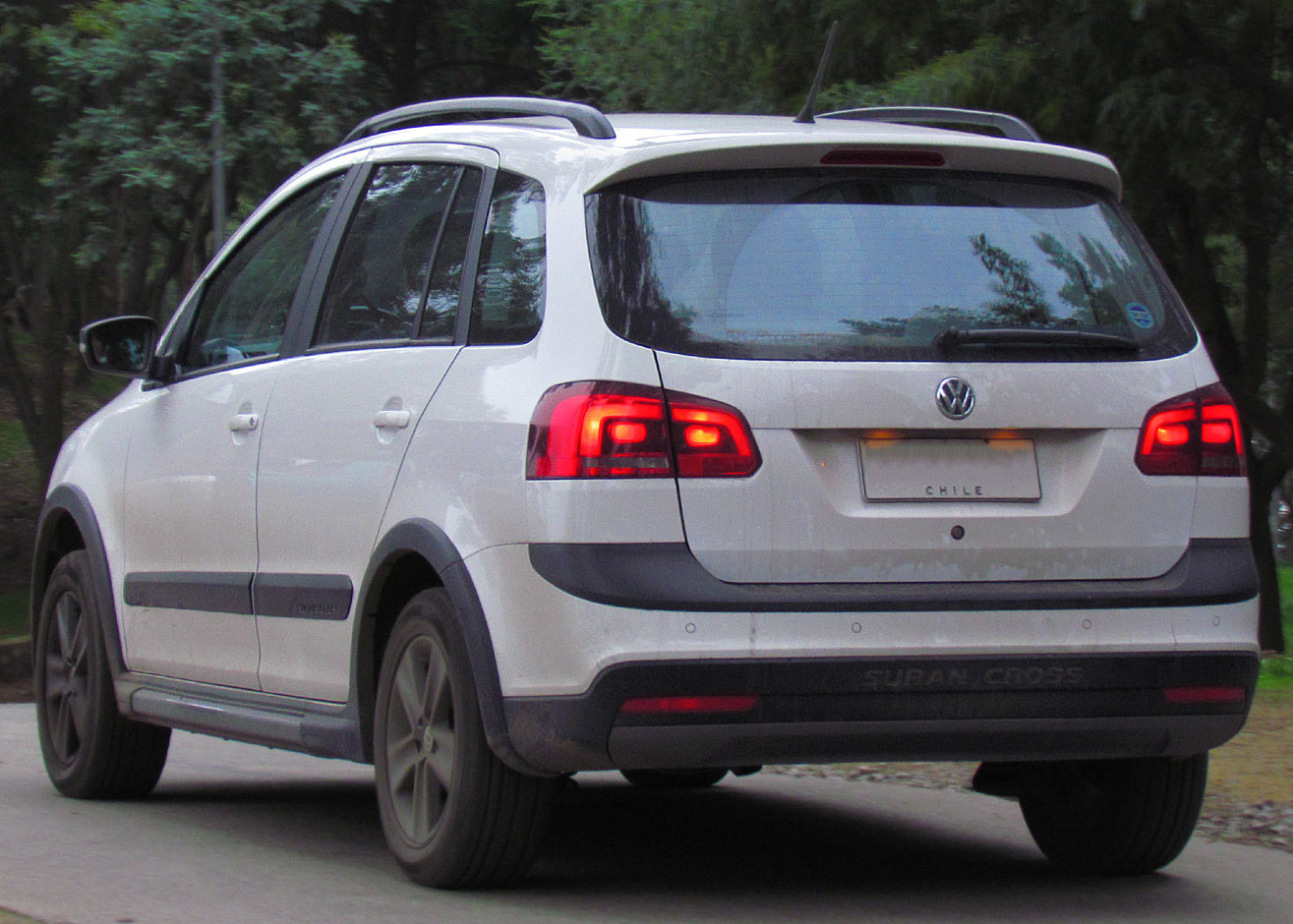
2012 Volkswagen Suran Cross

==== Safety ====
The Suran/Fox in its most basic Latin American market configuration with 2 airbags and no ESC received 3 stars for adult occupants and 3 stars for infants from Latin NCAP 2.0 in 2019.

Latin NCAP 2.0 test results Volkswagen Suran/Fox + 2 Airbags (2019, based on Euro NCAP 2008)
Test	Points	Stars
Adult occupant:	20.98/34.0	3 /5 stars
Child occupant:	27.13/49.00	3 /5 stars

== Sales ==
Year	Global production		Brazil sales	
Year	Fox	Suran	Fox	SpaceFox
2003			6,000	—N/a
2004			54,383	—N/a
2005			94,962	—N/a
2006			107,600	11,903
2007	206,125	45,690	126,291	27,611
2008	170,596	52,600	115,072	22,221
2009	176,114	44,936	129,199	31,915
2010	194,393	40,981	143,564	18,212
2011	160,751	48,473	121,594	22,122
2012	197,823	37,602	167,708	26,866
2013	164,763	39,674	129,939	20,309
2014	106,991	23,332	101,340	19,282
2015	85,161	24,691	79,204	6,906
2016	50,273	20,163	43,730	2,501
2017	50,739	21,093	42,719	2,085
2018	40,596	16,356	39,262	5,573
2019	43,675	600	38,487	1,750
2020	12,184		20,383	6
2021	18,162		17,946	4
2022			63	—N/a
2023			5	—N/a
