= Auto Mobil International =

Auto Mobil International (AMI Leipzig)
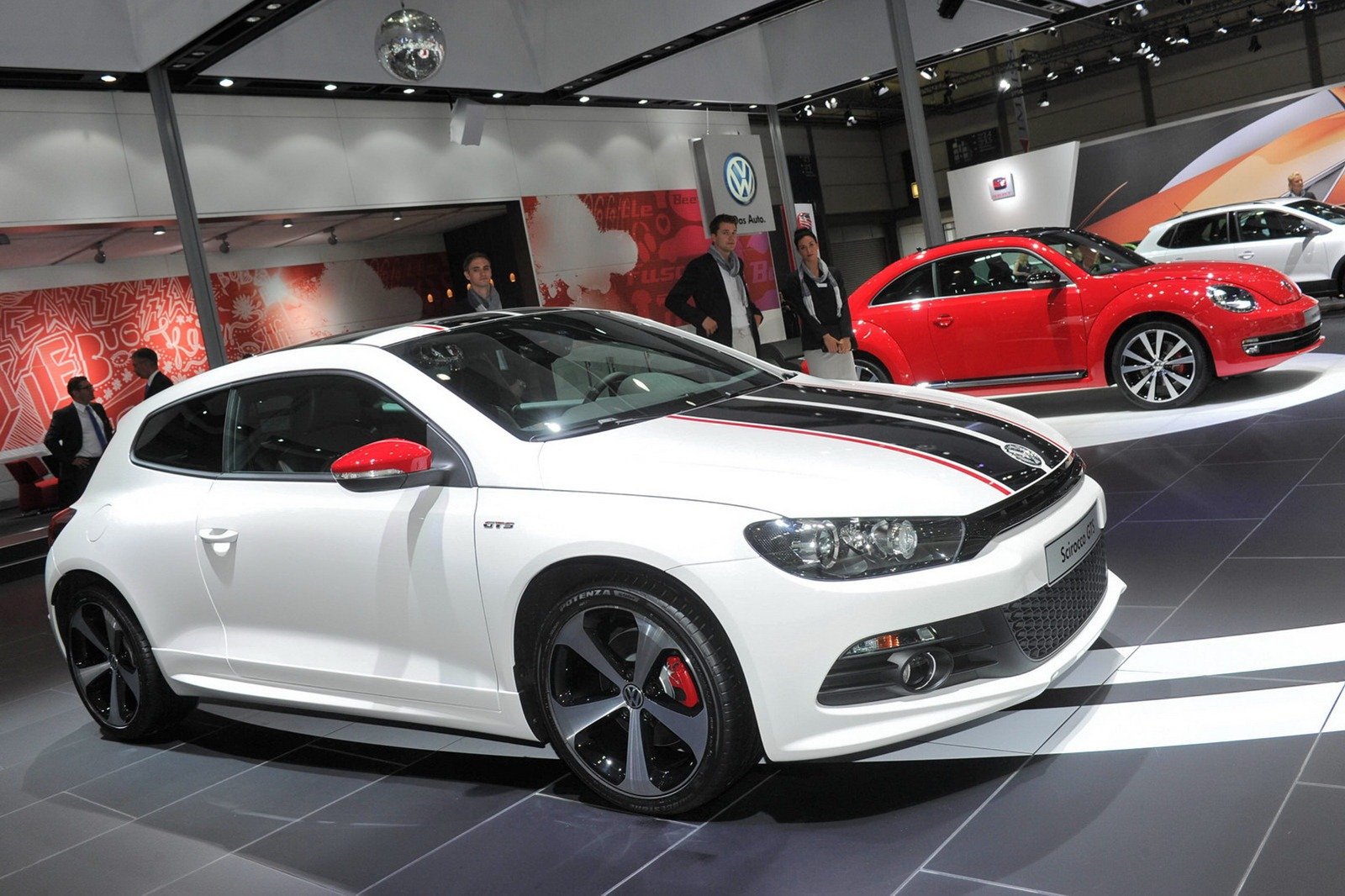
- Status: Active
- Venue: Leipzig Trade Fair
- Locations: Leipzig, Germany
- Inaugurated: 1991–present
- Website: ami-leipzig.de

The Auto Mobil International (AMI Leipzig), also known as Leipzig Auto Show, is the first motor show organized by the Leipziger Messe since 1991, in Leipzig, Germany. Spring 1991 saw the first car show in eastern Germany following the country’s reunification, the previous year. Featuring 273 exhibitors, it drew 113,402 visitors. Auto Mobil International has evolved as a top annual European exhibition attracting more than 400 exhibitors from 20 countries and around 270,000 visitors from 50 nations. In addition to the IAA in Frankfurt, which takes place every two years, it is the second largest German car show. AMI introduced many innovations in the automotive sector, including over 100 world, European and Germany premieres. Since 2010 the show is held every two years.

Parallel to the AMI is AMITEC, a trade fair for vehicle components, workshops and services.

== 2012 ==
This year, the AMI (Auto Mobil International) in Leipzig is Germany's only international motor show. It owes its status to the agreed rotation, due to which it takes place with the IAA in Frankfurt, every second year. Accordingly, the contingent of exhibitors is high and brands such as Rolls-Royce or Tesla even made their debut at the AMI. Overall, more than 80 premieres await visitors, including 20 world and European premieres. 450 companies and brands from 23 countries join the exhibition centre in Leipzig.

- Audi Q5
- Audi Q5 Hybrid
- BMW 114i
- BMW 3 Series M Performance Parts
- BMW 328i Touring
- BMW 330d Touring
- BMW 520d Gran Turismo Individual
- BMW 640d Gran Coupe Individual
- BMW M135i
- BMW M550d xDrive Touring
- BMW X6 M50d
- BT Design ETAPE Concept
- Honda CBR600F LCR Edition
- Mazda MX-5 Roadster "Yusho" Concept
- Volkswagen Beetle "Fender Edition"
- Volkswagen CC R-Line
- Volkswagen CrossPolo "Urban White"
- Volkswagen Scirocco GTS
- Volvo XC60 Inscription

== 2010 ==
- Audi A3
- Audi Q7
- Audi TT (facelift)
- BMW 5 Series Touring
- Chevrolet Cruze Irmscher Edition
- Ford Focus RS500
- Volkswagen Touran

== 2009 ==
- Audi TT-RS Roadster
- Chevrolet HHR "Capone"
- Ford Mondeo LPG
- Ford C-Max LPG
- Mercedes-Benz E-Klasse Taxi
- Peugeot 206+
- Volkswagen T5 California Beach Cape2Cape
- Volkswagen Golf GTD
- Volkswagen Golf Plus BiFuel

== 2005 ==
- Audi A4 DTM Edition
- Volkswagen Polo
- Volkswagen Fox

== 2004 ==
- Opel Combo Tour 1.6 CNG Prototype
