= British Motor Show =

Annual motor show held since 2021

The British Motor Show
- Status: Annual
- Genre: Motor show
- Begins: 15th August 2024
- Ends: 18th August 2024
- Venue: Farnborough International
- Location: Hampshire
- Country: England
- Inaugurated: 2021
- Most recent: 2024
- Next event: 2025
- Organiser: Automation Events
- Website: thebritishmotorshow.live

The British Motor Show is an annual car show that was initially launched in 2020 as a new format for a national motor show and the first show took place in 2021 with the first show delayed due to the pandemic.

As part of the new format, the show took place at new location at Farnborough International in Hampshire, with many exhibits outside. The event recorded 45,000 visitors in its first year returning, and proceeded to grow to almost 60,000 visitors in 2022. The British Motor Show is committed to a presence at Farnborough until at least 2025 as an annual event.

== 2025 ==
The 2025 show is scheduled from 15 to 17 August 2025.

== 2024 ==
The 2024 show ran from 15 to 18 August 2024. The MG Cyberster was named 'Best Sports Car' at the show.

== 2023 ==
The 2023 event ran from 17 to 20 August.

== 2022 ==
The event ran from 18 to 21 August 2022. British premieres included:

- Mazda CX-60
- Subaru Solterra

New cars on display for the first time included:

- Renault Megane E-Tech
- SsangYong Musso
- Vauxhall Astra
