= Salón Internacional del Automóvil México =

The Salón Internacional del Automóvil México (Mexico International Autoshow in English) or simply SIAM was an annual auto show held at the Banamex convention center of the Hipódromo de las Américas racecourse in Mexico City, Mexico. Planned as a successor to the Auto Expo del Automóvil it spanned only three editions from 2004 to 2006.

== Autoexpo del Automóvil ==
The first "Autoexpo del Automóvil" (Car Show) was held as an unofficial event on December 8, 1994, at the Palacio de los Deportes center, in Mexico City and was called "International Auto Show". By the early 90s, car marketing in Mexico was lean, and less than fifteen makers in this first Auto Expo but the real deal were cars like the Mustang Mach III, the Bugatti EB110 and a Batmobile. Its particular success led to a new edition the following year at the same venue.

In 1996, it changed its name to "Auto Expo Mundial" and moved to the World Trade Center México exposition center. The venue has three floors so the expo was divided in three sections: "Armadoras" (Carmakers) 1 and 2 and "Commercial" (for trucks and commercial vehicles). The car market started increasing since this year so every year more and more carmakers started assisting to this event. In 1998, Mexico was impressed by the entry of Ferrari cars that were presented in the Auto Expo. That would be the beginning of the entry of new carmakers.

The show was moved again in 2002 to the Centro Banamex convention center at the Hipódromo de las Américas racecourse.

== Extravaganzza Automotriz ==
For 2003, the organizing committee decided to deviate from the affordable-car paradigm of previous editions and presented the show under the "Extravaganzza Automotriz" motto. The show presented exotic and concept cars, notably Noble M12, TVR Cerbera Speed 12, Bugatti EB110, Chrysler ME Four-Twelve and others. This addition was met with strong criticism by attendants expecting to find what they expected from the previous shows. There were up to 30 makers, including exotic makers like TVR and Spyker and brands not available in Mexico such as Lancia and Morgan, but not mainstream manufacturers like General Motors or Nissan. This expo also included a tuning area that presented the modified vehicles from 2 Fast 2 Furious.

== Salón de México ==
The failure of the last Autoexpo gave Mexico the opportunity to raise as a country with gained automotive culture. The SIAM was born. Auto Moto Cycle took charge by the Asociación Mexicana de la Industria Automotriz (Mexican Automotive Industry Association) or "AMIA". AMC is the organizer of one of the most important auto shows in the world, the Paris Mondial de l'Automobile and also of many other important auto shows. The name "Salón de México" was given because other auto shows around the world are called for example "Salón de Paris" (for Mondial de l'Automobile). Almost every car manufacturer in Mexico assisted with the event, as well as manufacturers that were not yet in Mexico, like Mazda. The event was very successful and gave an opportunity for many new makers in Mexico to present their vehicles. The SIAM was then classified as a major international auto show. However, the 2005 edition saw a minor amount of brands, excluding Renault (which would return in 2006). Additionally, there were difficulties with parking at the venue as visitors could not park in the parking lot but were forced to leave their cars by the horse racecourse. The 2006 Auto Show saw even less brands, along with Renault, Peugeot, the whole of the Volkswagen Group (Audi, Volkswagen, Bentley, SEAT and Lamborghini) and others. After the 2006 event, the Auto Show was cancelled for 2007.

== SIAM 2008 ==
The Auto Show returns to the Centro Banamex site for 2008, from the 27 September to the 5 October. The exhibition opens from 10 am to 10pm on Saturdays and Sundays, and from 1pm to 9pm Monday to Friday. The show will close at 9pm on the final Sunday. There will be around 400 cars on display, including museum pieces, from a number of manufacturers, including Porsche, Lincoln, GM, Ford, Mazda, Mitsubishi, Mercury, Pontiac, Renault, Peugeot, Saab, Mercedes, Bentley, VW, Audi, Chrysler & Dodge. The show is expected to return in 2010 as a biennial event.

== Salones de México ==
- Autoexpo 1994
- Autoexpo 1995
- Autoexpo 1996
- Autoexpo 1997
- Autoexpo 1998
- Autoexpo 1999
- Autoexpo 2000
- Autoexpo 2001
- Autoexpo 2002
- Extravaganzza Automotriz 2003
- Salón Internacional del Automóvil México 2004
- Salón Internacional del Automóvil México 2005
- Salón Internacional del Automóvil México 2006
- Salón Internacional del Automóvil México 2008

== See also ==
- Cars in Mexico
- Auto show
