= Supercar Spectacle =

Biennial auto show held in Accra

- Status: Active
- Venue: Borteyman Sports Complex
- Location: Accra
- Country: Ghana
- Inaugurated: 2025

The Supercar Spectacle is Ghana's first automobile showcase of custom cars. It was first held in December 2025 in Accra, Ghana and attracted a number of custom and luxury cars, with cars from Ferrari, Lamborghini, and Audi on display.

== History ==
The Supercar Spectacle was co-founded by Ibrahim Mahama Jnr, Jaiden Osei, and Arnold Agblosu. The first edition was launched in November 2025 at the Polo Grounds in Accra, Ghana, and included music performances from King Promise and R2Bees.

=== IShowSpeed Ghana Tour Visit ===
On January 26 American streamer IShowSpeed visited Ghana as part of his last but one location on his first African tour. His tour got him to be hosted to a mini car show by the team at Supercar Spectacle who gave him an opportunity to enjoy a drift session in a Chrysler Hellcat car.
