= Baku Expo Center =

Baku Expo Center Bakı Ekspo Mərkəzi
- Baku Expo Center

General information
- Location: Baku, Azerbaijan
- Coordinates: 40.4403°N 50.0338°E
- Opening: June, 2010

Baku Expo Center (Baku Expo Exhibition and Convention Center) is a multipurpose events venue and exhibition center located near to the Heydar Aliyev International Airport in Baku, Azerbaijan. The complex covers 10 hectares in total, and the 3 hectare Expo Center building provides more than 20,000m² of exhibition space and includes facilities for hosting conferences, meetings, seminars, presentations and entertainment events. It opened on June 1st, 2010, with the 17th International Caspian Oil and Gas Exhibition.

== Notable Exhibitions ==
Notable exhibitions that have been held at the Baku Expo Center include:

=== 17th International Caspian Oil and Gas Exhibition ===
This event marked the first exhibition to be held at the Baku Exhibition Center. Held between July 1st-4th, 2010, 280 companies from 26 countries, including international companies such as Itochu, OMV Gas International, State Oil Company of Azerbaijan (SOCAR), Statoil ASA, Total and TPAO, participated in the exhibition.

=== 7th Azerbaijan International Automobile Exhibition ===
In March 2011, the 7th Azerbaijan International Automobile Exhibition was held for the first time at the Baku Expo Center. 105 companies from 14 countries such as Azerbaijan, Switzerland, Belarus, Denmark, Italy, Canada, China, Malaysia, Russia, Taiwan, Germany, Turkey and Japan participated in the exhibition. With focus areas on cars, commercial vehicles, car parts and accessories for all types of transport, the exhibition featured exhibits from Nissan, Infiniti, Hyundai, Jaguar, Land Rover, Range Rover, Volkswagen, NAZ and Lifan.

=== 23rd Azerbaijan International Health Exhibition ===
The 23rd Azerbaijan International Health Exhibition (BIHE-2017) was held at the Baku Expo Center on September 28th-30th, 2017. The aim of the exhibition was to enable the exchange of business relations and experience between employees of medical institutions, suppliers of modern medical equipment, and pharmacists. In total, 104 companies from 19 countries, including Azerbaijan, India, Italy, Iran, Belarus, Germany, China, Lithuania, Poland, Russia, Turkey, Ukraine and Switzerland, participated in the exhibition.

=== Aquatherm 2017 ===
Between October 18th-21st, 2017, an international exhibition dedicated to the 10th anniversary of heating, ventilation, air conditioning, water supply, sanitation, environmental technologies, swimming and renewable energy sources was held in the Baku Exhibition Center. Exhibitors included international companies from countries like China, Azerbaijan, France, Italy, Iran, Kuwait and Turkey, and included Euroclima, Yusiko, BestTechniK, Azertechnoline, Alarko Carrier Sanayi ve Ticaret, Egeplast Ege Plastik, Turan Makine, Termo ISI, Polimart, Ultratek, Sumgait Technologies Park, Kaskad-Hidro and Yetsan Pazarlama Isi Sistemleri.

=== 11th Azerbaijan International Education Exhibition ===
Between October 6th-8th 2017, the Baku Expo Center hosted the 11th Azerbaijan International Education Exhibition in partnership with the Azerbaijani Ministry of Education. Under the motto “Human capital is our wealth”, the exhibition featured a total of 14 higher education institutions, including Baku State University, Azerbaijan State University of Oil and Industry, French-Azerbaijani University (UFAZ), Azerbaijan State University of Economics, Azerbaijan State Pedagogical University, Baku Engineering University, Azerbaijan University of Architecture and Construction, Azerbaijan University of Technology, and the Azerbaijan University of Languages.
