= Sevenstock =

Gathering of Mazda rotary enthusiasts

Sevenstock is known as the largest annual gathering of Mazda rotary enthusiasts in the world. Attracting visitors from all over the globe to Southern California. After many years being held at Mazda's corporate headquarters in Irvine, California, the event has since moved to different locations. Highlights of the event include the display of many historic Mazda race cars and road going models, various notable guest speakers, car shows, and raffles. The event is coordinated by members of the Southern California RX Club.

== History ==
SevenStock began in 1998 as a local BBQ held by the Southern California RX-7 Club also known as the SoCal7's at that time and was an effort to bring together local RX-7 and rotary vehicle owners. As a play on the music and art festival of similar name held in New York, SevenStock was born. With less than twenty attendees at the first event, SevenStock has grown to hundreds of rotary vehicles and thousands of attendees. Both SevenStock 2 and 3 were also held at Frank G. Bonelli in San Dimas, CA, and continued to grow at a tremendous pace. SevenStock II had over 40 vehicles and SevenStock III boasted over 80 vehicles and more than 135 attendees.

SevenStock IV began a new chapter in the life of the event. After growing attendance and notoriety within the rotary community, SevenStock began to gain the attention of top tuners and even Mazda itself. SevenStock was moved to Mazda's Research and Development Center in Irvine, CA where the event saw exponential growth. The event now had grown to over 300 vehicles and attendees estimated around 2000. SevenStock 4 also featured the infamous LeMans winning 787B. Mazda North America President Charlie Hughes was on-hand to introduce the 4-rotor 700 horsepower (520 kW) race car to the crowd. Once the 787B was fired up SevenStock would never be the same. SevenStock became the destination to see up close and personal some of the most famous and historic Mazda rotary vehicles in the world. The 787B was driven by former Mazda program manager Takaharu "Koby" Kobayakawa who would become a regular at future SevenStock events. Other notable rotary powered vehicles on display include Flaco Racing's R100 and RX-7 drag cars, Racing Beat's record holding Bonneville racer, two 3-rotor sand rails as well as the "La Policia" drag car.

SevenStock IV through VIII were also held on-site at the Mazda Research and Development facility. Each year the event continued to grow as did the guest list of vehicles. SevenStock 5 hosted an estimated 4000 attendees and vehicles had to be turned away as over 400+ enthusiasts filled the Mazda parking lots and surrounding streets. In addition to the return of Mazda North America President Charlie Hughes and program manager Koby Kobayakawa, Kazuo Takada was also on hand to reminisce for the crowd. Takada, a former Mazda engineer and one of the fabled "47 Rotary Engineers" recalled the development of the rotary engine and explained how they overcame many of the obstacles faced during the development of the rotary engine.

SevenStock IX signaled a change for the event, as it was moved to Mazda's corporate headquarters in Irvine, CA, just a few miles from the R&D site. The new location was considerably larger and was able to accommodate the continued growth of the event. Today SevenStock has grown to become one of the largest all-rotary car shows and events of its kind and continues to be the Mecca of all things rotary. SevenStock has the support of Mazda, individuals and tuners worldwide. The now evolved Southern California RX Club includes all rotary powered vehicles from motorcycles to exotics and continues to organize and staff SevenStock along with help from the entire rotary community.

SevenStock XXIII is currently scheduled to take place at the California Speedway in Fontana, California, on 13 November 2021. The COVID-19 pandemic caused 2020 to go on hiatus. Sevenstock 28 scheduled to take place at the Universal Technical Institute in Rancho Cucamonga was canceled due to various reasons including permit issues.
