= New England Summer Nationals =

Popular four-day-long automotive festival in Worcester, Massachusetts

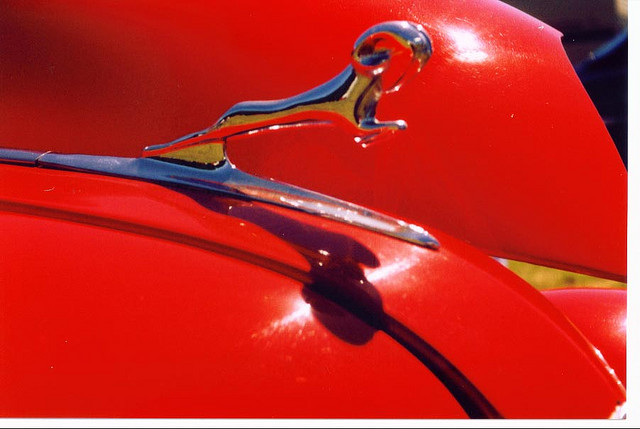
- Detail of a car hood at the 2006 New England Summer Nationals.
- Genre: Auto show
- Begins: July 4, 2013
- Ends: July 7, 2013
- Frequency: Annual
- Location: Worcester, Massachusetts
- Years active: 22
- Participants: 75,000+
- Patron: Bob Moscoffian
- Website: http://www.summernationals.com/

The New England Summer Nationals was a popular, annual, four-day-long automotive festival in Worcester, Massachusetts. It usually occurred on the July 4th holiday weekend. The 2012 show was on July 5–8. In 1980, the first such festival attracted 2,000 visitors; since then, attendees have peaked at 200,000, drawn from both New England and the rest of the United States. According to the Central Massachusetts Convention and Visitors Bureau, it is the largest automotive event on the East Coast. Since 1991, it has generally drawn at least 75,000 visitors.

== Events ==
The Summer Nationals has many events including drag racing, controlled burnouts, and stunt motorcycle riding.
