= Auto show =

Exhibition of vehicles

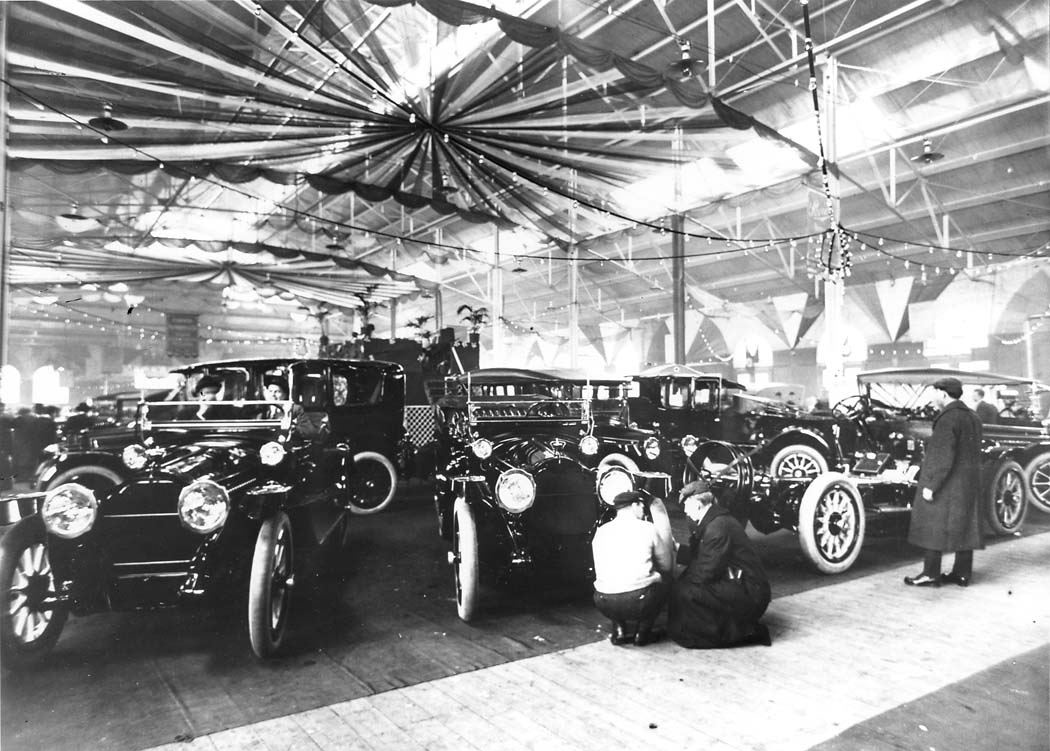
An auto show in Toronto, Canada in 1912

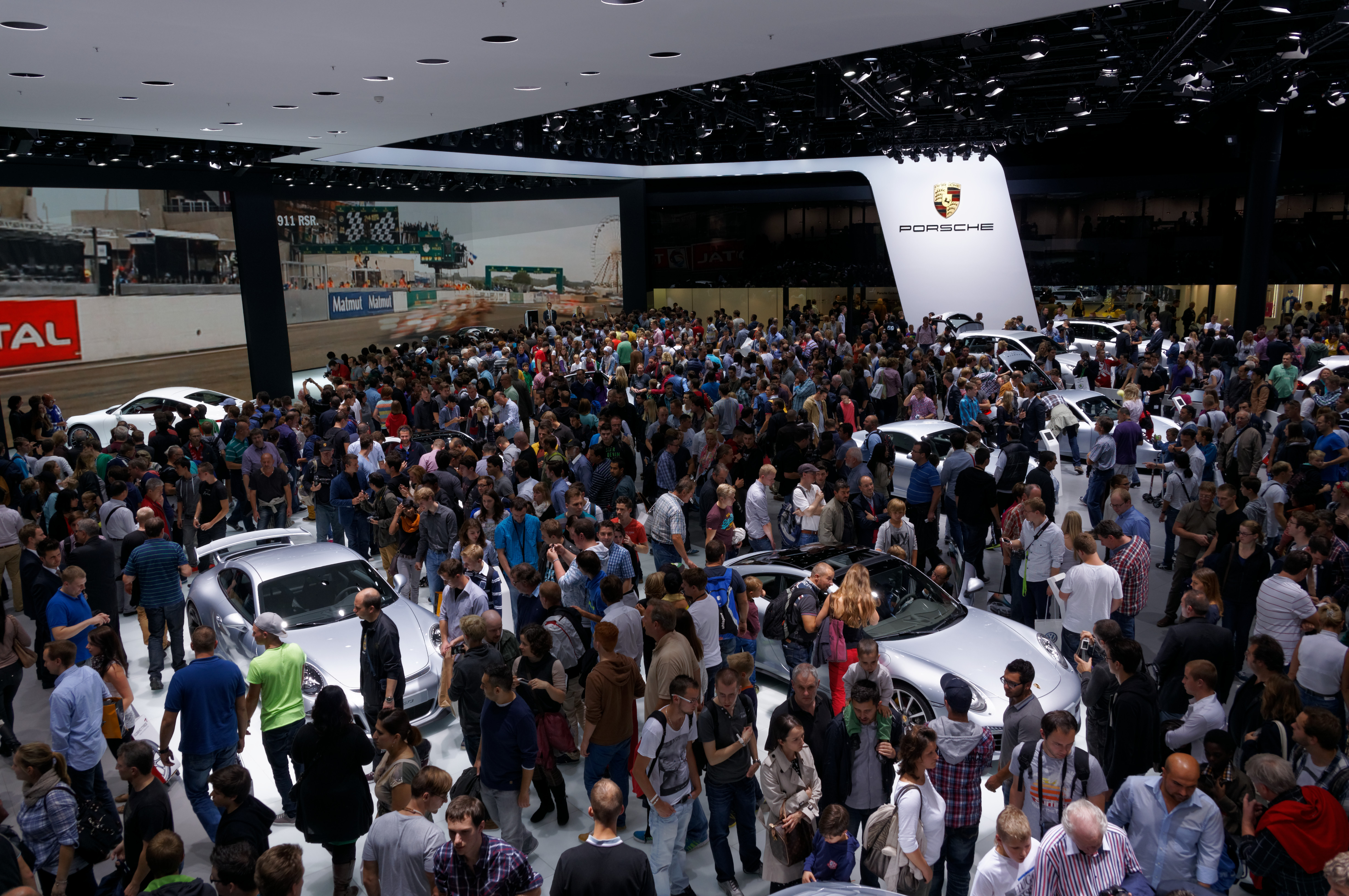
Inside the Porsche pavilion at the IAA 2013 in Frankfurt

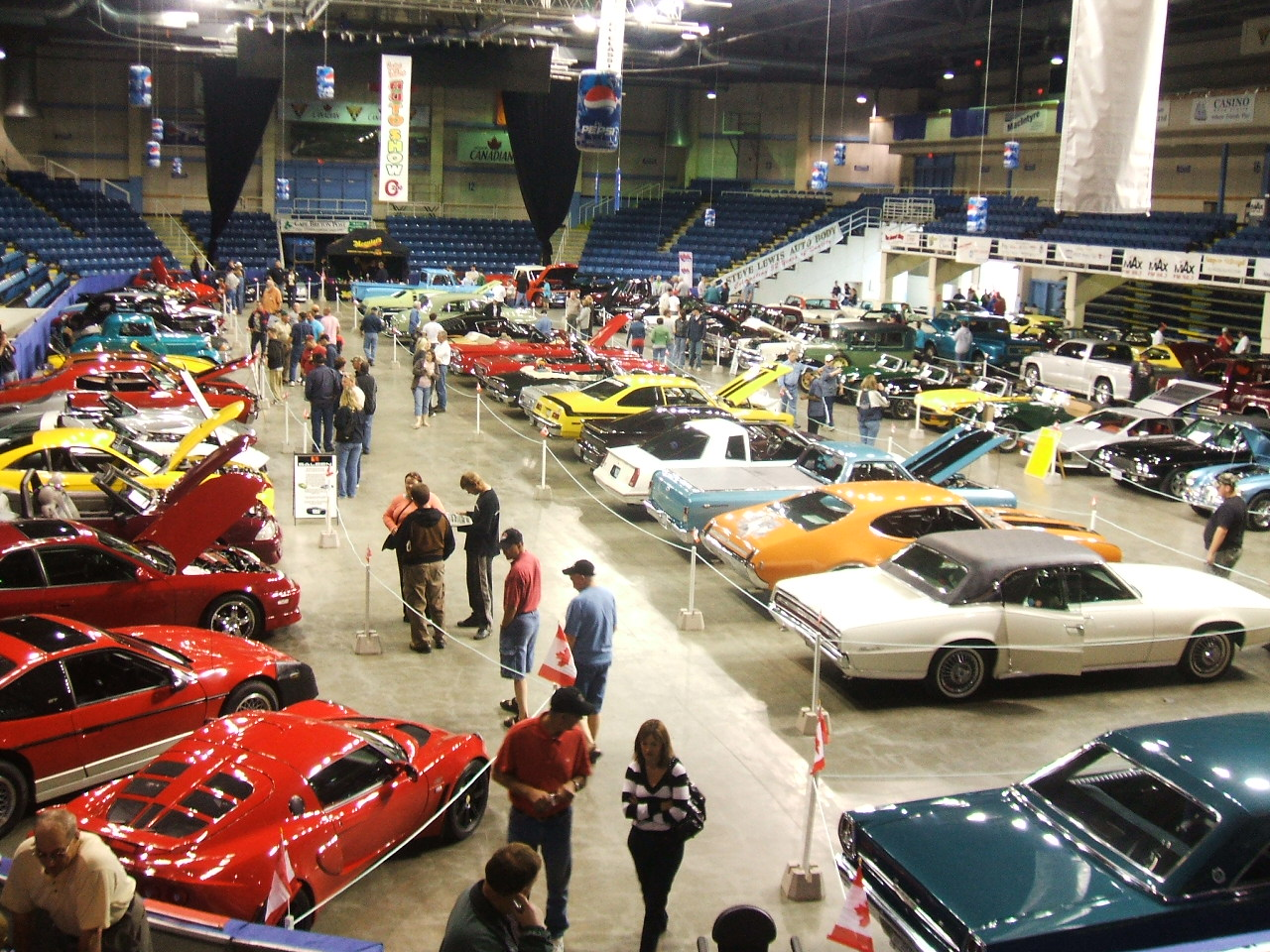
Antique and custom car show at Centre 200 in Sydney, Nova Scotia in 2008

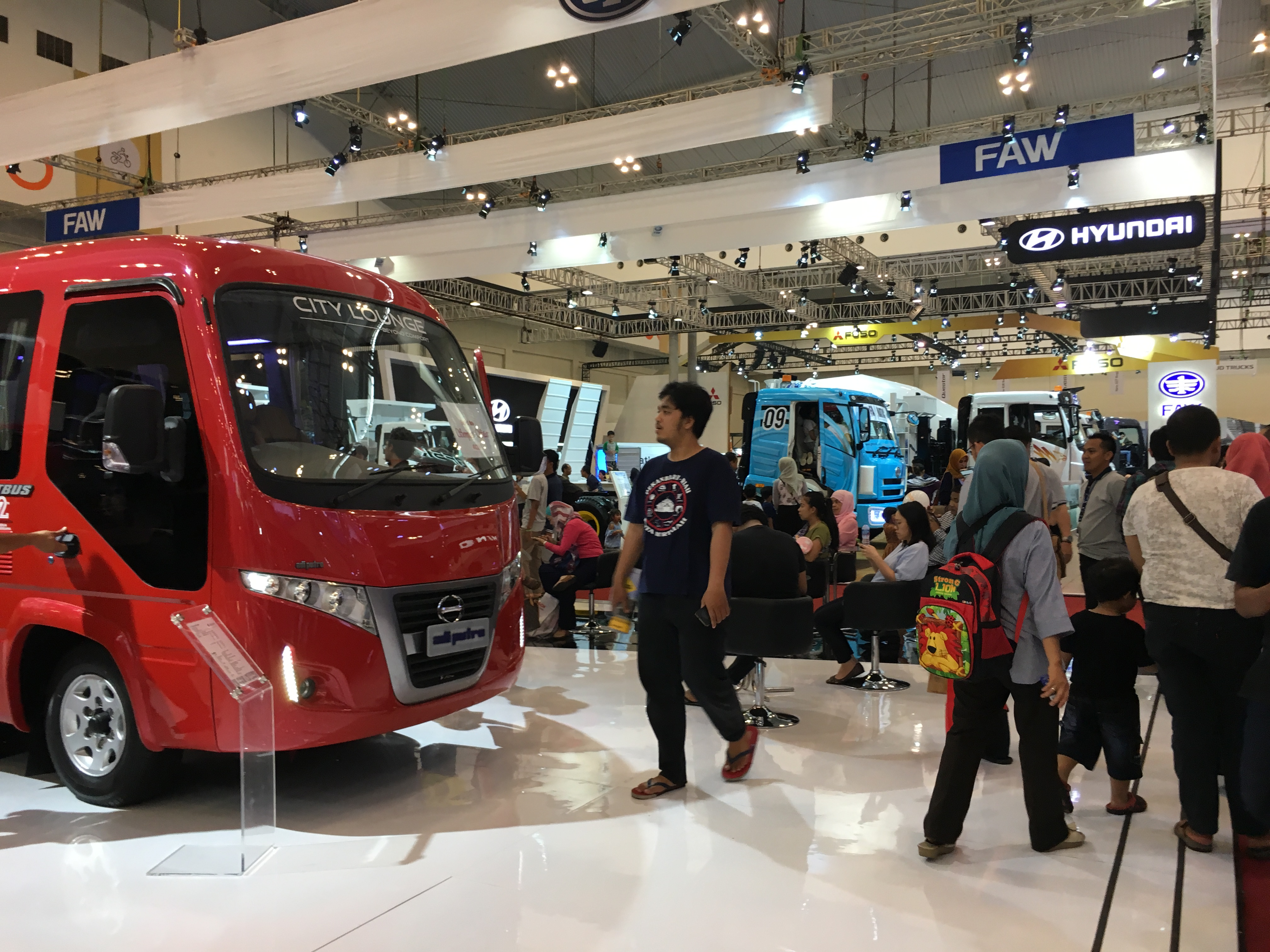
Lorries and buses at Indonesia International Auto Show 2017

An auto show, also known as a motor show or car show, is a public exhibition of current automobile models, debuts, concept cars, or out-of-production classics. It is attended by automotive industry representatives, dealers, auto journalists and car enthusiasts. Most auto shows occur once or twice a year. They are important to car manufacturers and local dealers as a public relations exercise, as they advertise new products and promote auto brands. The five most prestigious auto shows, sometimes called the "Big Five", were generally considered to be those held in Detroit, Frankfurt, Geneva, Paris and Tokyo. Car enthusiast communities along the historic U.S. Route 66 are credited with general popularization of car meets, including ethnic groups such as the Hispanos of New Mexico, Chicanos, and Mexican-Americans of the Southwestern United States; lowrider, high technology, electric vehicle, and other enthusiast show, are popular in Los Angeles, Las Vegas, Albuquerque, San Francisco, and Chicago for this reason.

Some auto shows have more than just cars including: all sorts of other vehicles. The types of vehicles can include buses, trucks and almost any other types of vehicles such as Auto Expo in Delhi brings a variety of vehicles ranging from private to commercial.

== Manufacturer and Dealer shows ==
The International Organization of Motor Vehicle Manufacturers organizes many auto shows, including the Big Five. These shows all have an advertising purpose. They are held as part of the sales strategy of the manufacturers.

== Enthusiast shows ==
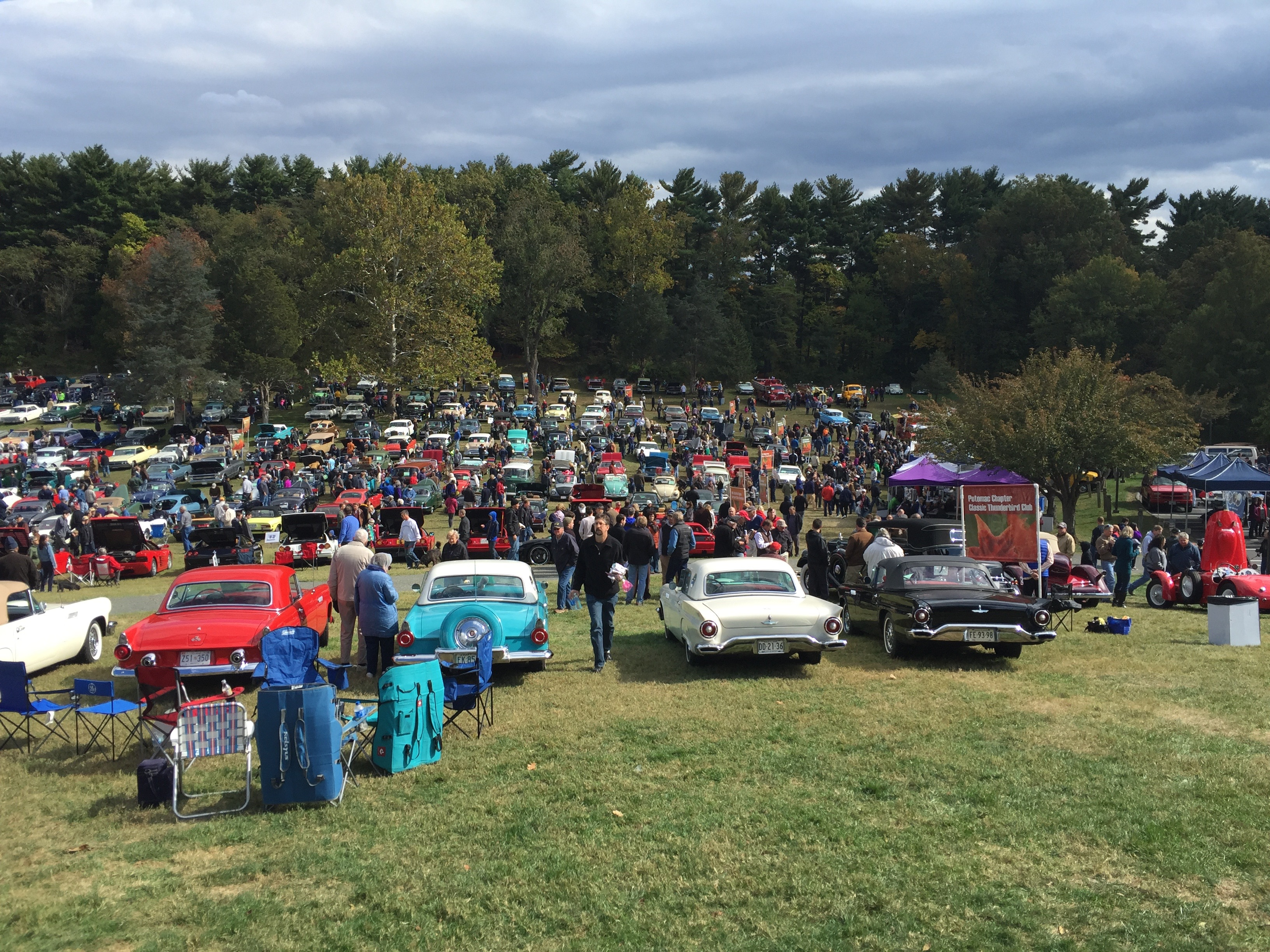
Rockville Antique and Classic Car Show 2015, free public access

There are other car shows that are organized by car enthusiast associations, automobile dealers, retail businesses, charitable organizations, or municipalities. There is no generally accepted term for these more common events.

Manufacturer car shows typically showcase vehicles currently being manufactured and available for purchase. Enthusiast car shows showcase individually owned vehicles, that are not currently being manufactured, and that are not available for purchase.

Enthusiast car shows have rules of entry, limiting the types of vehicles that may be shown, e.g. classic cars, hot rods, single-models (Corvette, Packard, Mustang, etc.), type of vehicle (station wagons, pickup trucks, orphan brands, etc…)

Enthusiast car shows usually draw their entries locally. There are many car shows in various localities across many nations. Some may even be free to go to.

== See also ==
- Auto racing
- Premiere
- Show car
- Concept cars
- Custom cars
- Tire lettering
- List of motor vehicle awards
- Modesto American Graffiti Festival
