= Virgin Oceanic =

Underwater leisure venture, part of the Virgin Group

Virgin Oceanic, LLC
- Company type: Limited liability company
- Founded: 2009
- Founder: Richard Branson
- Parent: Virgin Group
- Website: www.virginoceanic.com

Virgin Oceanic (originally Virgin Aquatic) is an undersea leisure venture of Newport Beach, CA businessman Chris Welsh and Sir Richard Branson, part of Sir Richard Branson's Virgin Group. The brand was first reported in a 2009 Time Magazine interview. The flagship service provided by Virgin Oceanic was intended to take visitors to the deepest parts of the ocean; however, as of late 2014, the project has been put on hold until more suitable technologies are developed.

== Fleet ==
- Necker Belle — sailing catamaran yacht
- Necker Nymph — open-cockpit SCUBA submersible
- Cheyenne — sailing catamaran yacht
- DeepFlight Challenger — high-depth submersible

== Shallow diving program ==
The company is offering a shallow water "wet" submersible, Graham Hawkes's Hawkes Ocean Technologies Deep Flight Merlin named Necker Nymph after Branson's private island in the British Virgin Islands, Virgin Limited Edition Necker Island. The Necker Nymph uses the Necker Belle as its mothership.

=== Necker Nymph ===
The shallow dive program utilizes the scuba-sub Necker Nymph, a HOT DeepFlight Merlin. It is a three-place sub, with two passengers and one dive pilot. All three are required to wear scuba gear.

== Deep diving program ==
The company plans to launch a deep sea submersible capable of carrying its passenger to extreme ocean depths. The deep sea adventure will be supported by the 125-ft super-catamaran Cheyenne mothership, and plans to use the HOT DeepFlight Challenger sub to make dives to the depths of the worlds oceans. Both the catamaran and the submersible were formerly owned by Steve Fossett, who had modified the racing catamaran to become the mothership for his planned oceanic dive record attempt. After Steve Fossett's death the project went on hold until Chris Welsh purchased the equipment from Fossett's estate and restarted the endeavor. The attempt on Challenger Deep was first announced in April 2011.

=== DeepFlight Challenger ===
This deep sea submersible, currently in the construction and testing phase, seats one person. The company has stated that it will be able to dive to the deepest part of the ocean, which has been measured to be somewhere between 10.91 kilometres (6.78 mi) deep and 11.03 kilometres (6.85 mi) deep. Only two subs in history, the Bathyscaphe Trieste in 1960 and Deepsea Challenger in 2012 have ever reached the deepest known point in the ocean at the bottom of the Mariana Trench. The sub's outer casing is made of a carbon fiber composite and is designed to maximize hydrodynamics. The second level of casing holds the batteries, dive tanks and all other components. The third and inner most layer is made of titanium with a quartz crystal viewing dome. Instead of using ballast like a typical submersible the DeepFlight Challenger will "fly" to the ocean floor using propulsion. The DeepFlight Challenger uses a custom lithium-ion battery system to power its two motors.

=== Five Dives project ===
Over the course of 2012 and beyond, Virgin Oceanic plans for their one-person sub to journey to the deepest part of each of Earth's five oceans. The first dive is planned for the deepest place on the planet: the bottom of the Mariana Trench – about 11 kilometers (7 mi) below the ocean's surface. This will be the third time human eyes have set sight there. This time, the plan is for a sub that "flies" more akin to an airplane which should allow its solo pilot, Chris Welsh, to not only reach the deepest point on Earth, but to then "fly" along the bottom of the Trench for up to an additional 10 kilometers (6 mi).

The second dive planned – to the bottom of the Puerto Rico Trench – will be piloted by Sir Richard Branson. This trench is the deepest point in the Atlantic Ocean at over 8 kilometers (5 mi) below sea level. This location is also near to Branson's home and resort on Necker Island in the British Virgin Islands.

Subsequent dives will be planned to carry a human pilot to the bottom of the Arctic, Southern and Indian oceans. Less than 3% of the seafloor has been explored, and none of the deepest points of the planet's oceans have ever been explored beyond a brief visit to one. The opportunities to see and learn from such dives are viewed as monumental.

==== Key dates and timings ====
Originally Virgin Oceanic's first dive was announced to be scheduled for August 2011 at the Mariana Trench later in 2011, and further dives were scheduled over the next 24 months. As of 20 September 2011 the research and development phase of the program has been extended due to work on design modification, this will extend the testing period through the end of 2011 and move the earliest opportunity of a first dive into early 2012. As of 21 February 2012, Virgin Oceanic reported successful tests of the ballast and life support systems. However, in June 2012, Welsh described a crack in the sub's protective quartz sphere which would necessitate the sphere's replacement before any deep dives could take place. By September 2012, variable buoyancy problems detected in summer testing had been resolved.

Based on testing at high pressure, the DeepFlight Challenger was determined to be suitable only for a single dive, not the repeated uses that had been planned as part of Virgin Oceanic service. As such, in 2014, Virgin Oceanic "scrapped" plans for the five dives project using the DeepFlight Challenger, as originally conceived, putting plans on hold until more suitable technologies are developed.

== See also ==
- Deepsea Challenger, a submarine and oceanographic mission to Challenger Deep.
