= Titan (submersible) =

Submersible that imploded in 2023

- Titan in a promotional image published by OceanGate before 2023

History
- Name: Titan
- Owner: OceanGate, Inc.
- Operator: OceanGate, Inc.
- Completed: 2018
- Fate: Imploded on 18 June 2023

General characteristics
- Class & type: Unclassed submersible
- Displacement: Light displacement: 10,432 kg (23,000 lb)
- Length: 6.7 m (22 ft)
- Beam: 2.8 m (9 ft 2 in)
- Height: 2.5 m (8 ft 2 in)
- Propulsion: 4 × Innerspace 1002 electric thrusters
- Speed: 3 knots (5.6 km/h) (max)
- Endurance: 96 hours (w/ 5 people)
- Test depth: Up to 4,000 m (13,000 ft)
- Capacity: 5 people
- Crew: 1 pilot, 1 technical expert, 3 passengers

Titan, previously named Cyclops 2, was a submersible created and operated by the American underwater tourism company OceanGate. It was the first privately owned submersible with a claimed maximum depth of 4 kilometers (13,000 ft; 2.5 mi), and the first completed crewed submersible with a hull constructed of titanium and carbon fiber composite materials.

After testing with dives to its maximum intended depth in 2018 and 2019, the original composite hull of Titan developed fatigue damage and was replaced by 2021. In that year, OceanGate began transporting paying customers to the wreck of the Titanic, completing several dives to the wreck site in 2021 and 2022. During the submersible's first 2023 expedition, which took place in June, all five occupants were killed when the vessel imploded. OceanGate lost contact with Titan on 18 June and contacted authorities later that day after the submersible did not return on schedule. A massive international search and rescue operation ensued and ended on 22 June, when debris from Titan was discovered about 500 metres (550 yd; 1,600 ft) from the bow of the Titanic. The incident became widely discussed on social media as the story developed, and inspired grimly humorous Internet memes that ridiculed the submersible's deficient construction, OceanGate's perceived poor safety record, and the individuals who died. The memes were criticized as insensitive, with American TV presenter David Pogue deeming them "inappropriate and a little bit sick".

Industry experts, friends of OceanGate CEO Stockton Rush, and OceanGate employees had stated concerns about the safety of the vessel. The subsequent investigation by the U.S. Coast Guard highlighted serious safety concerns, criticizing OceanGate's operational practices and identifying a "toxic workplace culture" in which safety warnings were suppressed. The report concluded that Rush "exhibited negligence that contributed to the deaths" and created a false impression of the submersible's safety.

== Background ==
Since the discovery of the Titanic wreckage in 1985, limited tours of the wreck have been conducted, including the (Finnish-made) Russian Mir-class submersibles in the 1990s, which captured the footage for the opening scenes of the eponymous 1997 film.

After carrying tourists to the wreck of Andrea Doria in 2016, OceanGate CEO Stockton Rush said "there's only one wreck that everyone knows... if you ask people to name something underwater, it's going to be sharks, whales, Titanic." OceanGate's Titan was used for several survey expeditions of the Titanic wreckage site, starting in 2021. Rush stated that Titan could be used to explore the debris field and build a 3-D model of the wreck.

== Design and construction ==
=== Features ===
Schematic of Titan, with human figures for scale

Titan was 670 by 280 by 250 centimetres (21 ft 11.8 in × 9 ft 2.2 in × 8 ft 2.4 in) and weighed 9,525 kilograms (21,000 lb) with a maximum payload of 685 kilograms (1,510 lb). It moved at up to three knots (5.6 km/h; 3.5 mph) using four electric thrusters, arrayed two horizontal and two vertical. According to OceanGate, the vessel carried sufficient oxygen to sustain a full complement of five people for 96 hours.

The entire pressure vessel for the crew used five major components: two hemispherical titanium end caps, two matching titanium interface rings, and the 142-centimetre (4 ft 8 in) internal diameter, 2.4-meter-long (94 in; 7.9 ft) carbon fiber-wound cylindrical hull. The forward hemispherical end cap could be detached from its interface ring, becoming a hatch that allowed crew members to enter the crew compartment before a mission, and exit at its conclusion. In addition to the crew compartment, Titan included a landing skid structure and an outer fiberglass composite shell covering mechanical equipment; both the skid and shell were bolted to the titanium interface rings.

OceanGate's calculations showed the cylinder that formed the center section of the crew compartment should have a wall thickness of 114 millimetres (4.5 in), which they rounded up to 127 millimetres (5.0 in); it consisted of 480 alternating layers of pre-preg unidirectional cloth, laid in the axial direction, and wet-wound filament, laid in the hoop direction. Spencer Composites completed the design and assembly of the cylinder in 2017 after curing it at 137 °C (279 °F) for 7 days.

Each titanium end cap had a wall thickness of 83 millimetres (3 1/4 in). One interface ring was bonded to each end of the cylindrical hull, and the end caps were bolted to the interface rings. The penetrations for external cables ran through the interface rings. The forward end cap was fitted with an experimental 380-millimetre-diameter (15 in) acrylic window, shaped as a modified conical frustum 180 millimetres (7 in) thick. According to Rush, it would protrude into the cabin by 19 millimetres (3/4 in) during dives. The viewport was rated only to 650 metres (2,130 ft).

Titan was equipped with a real-time acoustic monitoring system, which OceanGate claimed could detect the onset of buckling in the carbon fiber hull prior to catastrophic failure. Rush held a patent on the system. Titan was controlled with a modified game controller, similar to Cyclops 1.

Once the occupants were aboard, the hatch was closed and bolted from the outside; there was no way to open the hatch from inside the vessel. In addition, there was no on-board location system; the support ship which monitored the position of Titan relative to its target would send text messages to Titan providing distances and directions.

=== Construction ===
A March 2015 OceanGate video outlining the design of Cyclops, the predecessor to Titan

OceanGate began developing a composite carbon fiber and titanium-hulled submersible in collaboration with the University of Washington's Applied Physics Laboratory (APL-UW) in 2013, tentatively named Cyclops 2; the first titanium structural components were ordered in December 2016 from Titanium Fabrication Corp. (TiFab), and OceanGate signed a contract with Spencer Composites in January 2017 for the carbon-composite cylinder.

Spencer previously had built the composite pressure hull for the single-person DeepFlight Challenger for Steve Fossett to a design by Graham Hawkes. (Note: After Fossett died, DeepFlight Challenger was acquired by Richard Branson's Virgin Oceanic, which had announced plans to conduct a series of five dives to the deepest points of the oceans; DeepFlight refused to endorse the plan, as the craft had been designed to dive only once. Adam Wright, the president of DeepFlight, said in 2014 "The problem is the strength of the [DeepFlight Challenger] does decrease after each dive. It is strongest on the first dive.") Spencer Composites was given challenging performance targets for Cyclops 2, which was meant to withstand 6,600 pounds per square inch (46 MPa; 450 atm) working service pressure with a factor of safety of 2.25× for its intended maximum depth of 4,000 metres (2.5 mi; 13,000 ft), and provided six weeks to complete the design. In March 2018, Cyclops 2 was renamed to "Titan"; and Rush described it "an amazing engineering feat" during its launch in 2018.

In an interview published in 2020 with Teledyne Marine, a subsea technology company, it was noted that many Oceangate employees were recent graduates. Rush responded that he, unlike other submarine enterprises, "wanted [his] team to be younger, be inspirational" instead of including "ex-military submariners", who he described as "a whole bunch of 50-year-old white guys".

=== Design issues ===
In 2015, when Rush visited DOER Marine seeking lessons learned from "Project Deep Search", DOER's president, Liz Taylor, specifically warned him against using carbon fiber; in 2023, she recounted that carbon fiber specifically has "been shown to not be very happy when it's being immersed first of all and then being hollow on the inside or just one atmosphere on the inside and then having the tremendous pressure of the ocean trying to push in on it, it's not the right material".

The Marine Technology Society's committee on Manned Underwater Vehicles (now called Submarine Committee) drafted a private letter to Rush in March 2018, expressing concerns with the design of Titan and urging him to have the ship "classed" (certified by a ship classification society), partly because the marketing of the submersible, which stated it would meet or exceed the standards of DNV, was misleading because OceanGate had no intentions to have the vehicle tested by DNV. There were 38 people who agreed to have their signature on the letter. Although the letter was not sent, the chair of the committee, William Kohnen, said he had "a frank conversation" with Rush following which they "agreed to disagree".

Rob McCallum had consulted for OceanGate in 2009, but left over his concerns that vessel development was being hurried. In 2018, he emailed Rush, warning him the development cycle and refusal to have the ship classed was "potentially placing yourself and your clients in a dangerous dynamic", adding that in Rush's "race to Titanic you are mirroring that famous catch cry: 'She is unsinkable.'" Rush's response called the email "a serious personal insult" and complained about "the baseless cries of 'you are going to kill someone.'"

In response to the 2018 letter from MTS members, OceanGate published in 2019 a blog post explaining why Titan was not classed. In the post, OceanGate said "the vast majority of marine (and aviation) accidents are a result of operator error, not mechanical failure" and argued that classification focused solely on the physical state of the vessel and not its corporate actions, which it characterized as a "constant, committed effort and a focused corporate culture" of "maintaining high-level operational safety".

Journalist David Pogue, who participated in an OceanGate Titanic excursion in 2022, noted that Titan was not equipped with an emergency locator beacon; during his expedition, the surface support vessel lost track of Titan "for about five hours", and adding such a beacon was discussed. "They could still send short texts to the sub, but did not know where it was. It was quiet and very tense, and they shut off the ship's internet to prevent us from tweeting." Screenwriter Mike Reiss confirmed the submersible lost contact on each of the four dives he had made with OceanGate and said "that seems to be just something baked into the system". As an example, Reiss reported that it took three hours to locate Titanic during one dive, despite landing only 500 yards (460 m; 1,500 ft) from the wreck.

=== Testing and inspection ===
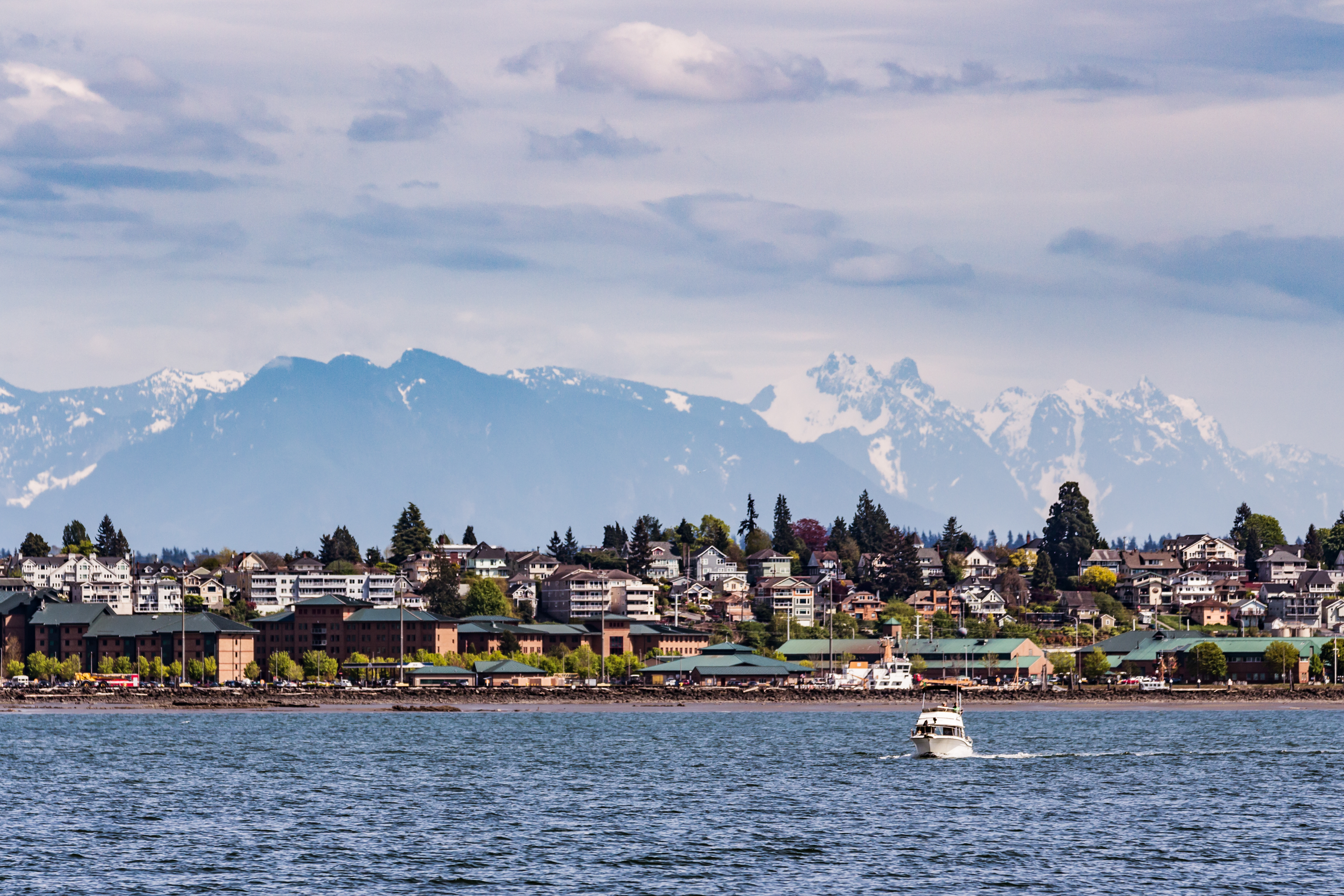
Shallow water test dives were carried out in Puget Sound.

OceanGate claimed on its website as of 2023 that Titan was "designed and engineered by OceanGate Inc. in collaboration [with] experts from NASA, Boeing, and the University of Washington". A 1/3-scale model of the Cyclops 2 pressure vessel was built and tested at the University of Washington Applied Physics Laboratory; the model was able to sustain a pressure of 4,285 pounds per square inch (29.54 MPa; 291.6 atm), corresponding to a depth of approximately 3,000 metres (9,800 ft). After the disappearance of Titan in 2023, the University of Washington stated that the Applied Physics Laboratory had no involvement in "design, engineering, or testing of the Titan submersible". A Boeing spokesperson also said that Boeing "was not a partner on the Titan and did not design or build it". A NASA spokesperson said that NASA's Marshall Space Flight Center had a Space Act Agreement with OceanGate, but "did not conduct testing and manufacturing via its workforce or facilities". Rush had touted partnerships with NASA, Boeing, and UW to Pogue in 2022 in response to a question about the perceived "MacGyvery jerry-rigged-ness [sic]" improvisational design based on the use of off-the-shelf components. Documents leaked to Wired showed that partnerships with UW and Boeing dissolved and design recommendations and rigorous testing requirements were ignored.

David Lochridge, OceanGate Director of Marine Operations, inspected Titan as it was being handed over from Engineering to Operations and filed a quality control report in January 2018 in which he stated that no non-destructive testing of the carbon fiber hull had taken place to check for voids and delaminating which could compromise the hull's strength. Instead, Lochridge was told that OceanGate would rely on the real-time acoustic monitoring system, which he felt would not warn the crew of potential failure with sufficient time to safely abort the mission and evacuate. The day after he filed his report, he was summoned to a meeting in which he was told the acrylic window was only rated to a 1,300-metre (4,300 ft) depth because OceanGate would not fund the design of a window rated to 4,000 metres (13,000 ft). In that meeting, he reiterated his concerns and added he would refuse to allow crewed testing without a hull scan; Lochridge was dismissed from his position as a result. He filed a whistleblower complaint with Occupational Safety and Health Administration (OSHA). That June, OceanGate filed a lawsuit against him accusing him of improperly sharing proprietary trade secrets. It also fraudulently manufactured a reason to dismiss him. The suit was settled in November 2018 and he withdrew his complaint with OSHA. This original viewport was only rated to 650 metres (2,130 ft).

Pogue: How many backup systems do you have for the thing collapsing?
Rush: So the key on that one is, we have an acoustic monitoring system. Carbon fiber makes noise. There're millions of fibers there. [...] It makes noise, and it crackles. When the first time you pressurize it, if you think about it, of those million fibers, a couple of 'em are sorta weak. They shouldn't have made the team. And when it gets pressurized, they snap, and they make a noise. The first time you get to, say, 1,000 meters, it will make a whole bunch of noise. And then you back off, and it won't make any noise until you exceed the last maximum [depth]. And so when, the first time we took it to full pressure, it made a bunch of noise. The second time, it made very little noise.

Pogue: Could you get three hours back to the surface in time [after the system provides an alert]?
Rush: Yes. Yes, 'cause what happens is once you stop going down, the pressure, now it's easier. You just have to stop your descent.

— Stockton Rush, 2022 interview series with David Pogue, published June 2023

Initial shallow dive testing with a crew was conducted in Puget Sound. OceanGate said that testing of Titan without a crew to 4,000 metres (13,000 ft) was performed in June 2018 to validate the design, conducted near Great Abaco Island, near the edge of the continental shelf, as the platform would only need to be towed 10 nautical miles (12 mi; 19 km) to depths exceeding 4,600 metres (15,000 ft). During a subsequent human-piloted descent, Rush became the second solo human to descend to 4,000 metres (13,000 ft) on 10 December 2018, after James Cameron, who in 2012 dove to Challenger Deep in the Mariana Trench, approximately 11,000 metres (36,000 ft). Partway through that solo dive in December 2018, Rush used the vertical thrusters to overcome unexpected positive buoyancy when descending past 3,000 metres (10,000 ft), which caused interference with the communication system, and he lost contact with the surface ship for approximately one hour.

In April 2019, OceanGate announced that a crew of four had set a record by descending in Titan to 3,760 metres (12,340 ft). Karl Stanley, (Note: Karl Stanley was described as a "self-taught engineer" who had built and operated two submersibles before 2008. Based on his experience building and testing submersibles, and taking tourists underwater, Stanley told Rush that a minimum of 50 test dives should be taken before accepting paid passengers.) who had participated in the April 2019 dive alongside Rush, later sent an email to Rush stating his concerns with loud cracking noises they had experienced during the dive. In Stanley's opinion, the noises were associated with a potential "flaw/defect in one area being acted on by the tremendous pressures and being crushed/damaged", adding he felt it meant there was "an area of the hull that is breaking down". In a later email, Stanley was more blunt in his assessment: "I think that hull has a defect near that flange, that will only get worse. The only question in my mind is will it fail catastrophically or not." Rush responded by stating more tests would be conducted.

After the tests were completed in January 2020, the hull of Titan began showing signs of fatigue and the craft was de-rated to 3,000 metres (9,800 ft). The Spencer-built composite cylindrical hull was replaced by Electroimpact and Janicki Industries in early 2021, prior to the first trips to Titanic. According to Rush, the carbon fiber materials had belonged to Boeing, but OceanGate had purchased them at a significant discount because they were past their shelf-life. Boeing stated they had no record showing they sold carbon fiber to OceanGate or Rush.

In 2021, a new hull was constructed after a previous hull had cracked after only 50 submersion dives, only three of which were to 4,000 m. Rush lied to investors and the public claiming the delay was related to issues with maritime law. Scale models of the hull imploded at the UW lab, so a different method of curing the hull was developed and passed a full-sized pressure test at a facility in Maryland. Rush refused to construct new domes and other components from the failed submersible and instructed the engineers to salvage and reuse parts. Anonymous former employees told Wired that damage to the components could have weakened the joinery with the new hull. They also added lifting rings, which was previously warned against by engineers because the submersible could not handle any tension or load.

In the first half of 2021 shallow water test dives were made in Washington state with prospective Titanic expedition passengers.

In spring of 2021, one passenger did a test dive in Titan to a depth of 500 meters in Possession Sound with Rush as pilot. The passenger said that the test dive went well, and was satisfied with the safety of the submersible. He applied for a spot on the Titanic expedition, and participated in an OceanGate Titanic expedition later that year.

In May 2021 television host Josh Gates and camera operator Brian Weed did a Titan test dive in Puget Sound. The dive was aborted due to multiple technical issues, reaching a depth of only 30 meters. During Gates and Weed's dive, communications were lost, the propulsion system encountered errors, and the computers on the submersible stopped working. Rush tried to reboot the submersible using its touchscreen but was unable to. Gates and Weed declined OceanGate's invitation to take part in a Titanic expedition, which began a month later.

== Titanic tourism operations ==
Titan dives to Titanic took place during multi-day excursions organized by OceanGate. The passengers and crew would embark on the support ship from St. John's, Newfoundland, and sail southward for two days until they reached the location of the Titanic wreckage. The support ship remained stationed above the wreckage site for five days, during which dives to Titanic were attempted aboard Titan. Two dives were generally attempted during each excursion, though many dives were cancelled or aborted before reaching Titanic due to bad weather or technical malfunctions. The final two days of the excursion were spent sailing back to port.

Non-crew passengers were called "mission specialists" by OceanGate. Mission specialists either paid for their spots or were invited guests such as journalists or YouTubers. When OceanGate's initial plans for the Titanic expeditions were announced in 2017 each tourist's seat was priced at US$105,129, a price OceanGate chose because it was the price of the ticket for the Vanderbilt suite on Titanic in 1912, adjusted for inflation. Paying customers later paid up to $250,000 for the excursion. OceanGate did not offer refunds. If a customer's dive was cancelled they were offered a spot on an excursion the following summer for free if the dive had been cancelled due to technical issues, and for half price if the dive had been cancelled due to weather conditions.

Continued testing of the novel hull precluded operations in 2018. By 2019, the cost of a ticket on Titan to view Titanic had risen to $125,000; 54 tourists had signed up for one of six voyages that were scheduled to begin on 27 June, but those plans were delayed until 2020 because permits could not be secured for the surface support vessel. The proposed operation involved MV Havila Harmony (sailing under a non-Canadian flag), and would have violated the Coasting Trade Act, which prohibits foreign-flagged vessels from conducting commercial voyages with origin and destination ports in Canada, analogous to the United States' Jones Act. In January 2020, the original hull was de-rated to 3,000 m (9,800 ft) maximum depth after signs of fatigue were found, and the COVID-19 pandemic in the United States delayed the procurement of carbon fiber filament needed to build a replacement hull. In November 2020, Rush announced the first voyage to Titanic would be delayed to May 2021.

=== Titanic Experience Tour ===
During the off season OceanGate transported Titan around the United States on a tour they called the "Titanic Experience Tour" which consisted of both public and invitation-only events. During the tours, visitors were able to step aboard Titan and view photos of the Titanic wreckage through the vessel's viewport.

== Titanic dives and dive attempts ==
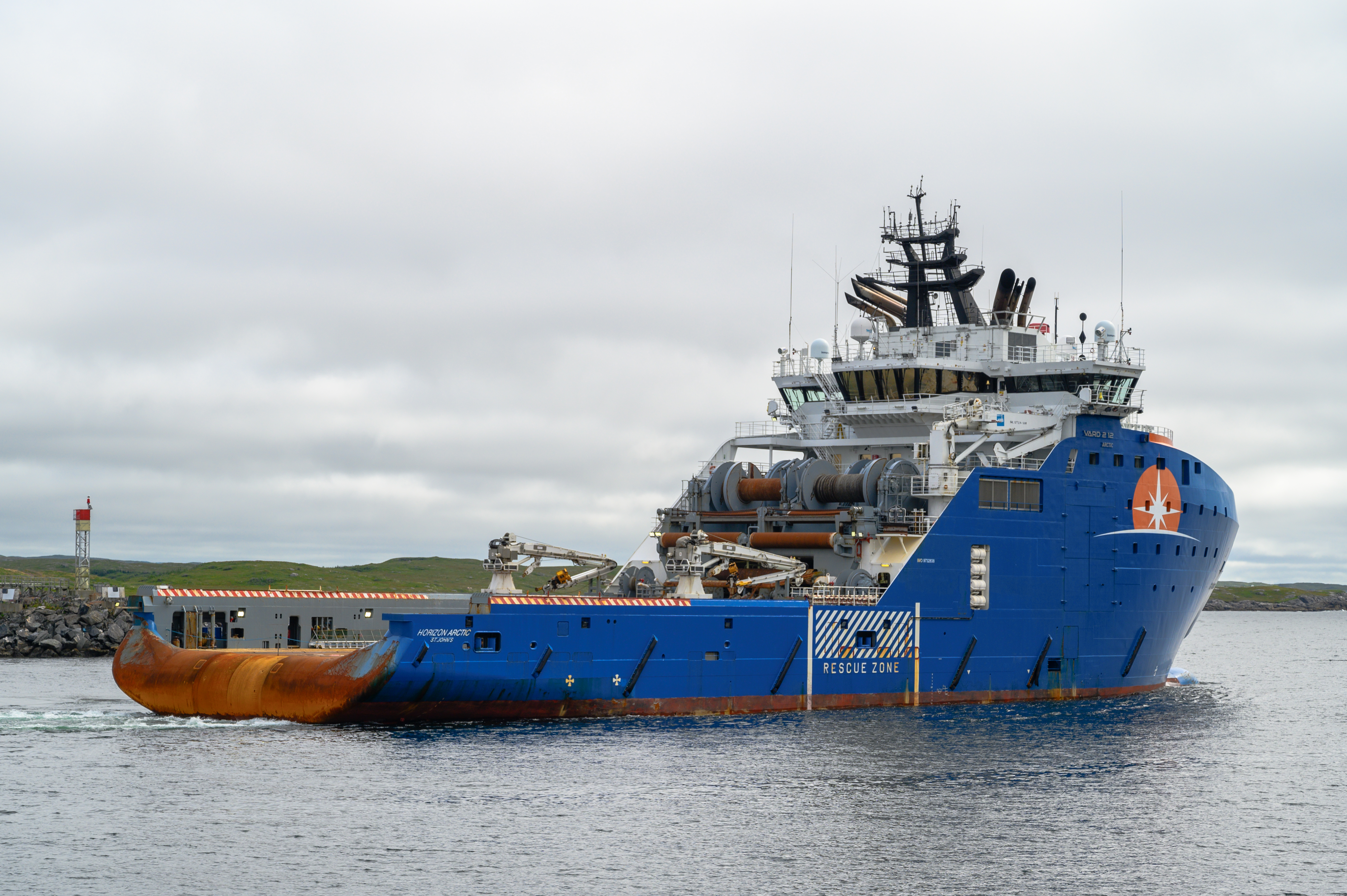
AHTS Horizon Arctic at Port aux Basques (August 2022)

=== 2021 ===
OceanGate organized five Titanic excursions during 2021. For the 2021 season, OceanGate selected Canadian-flagged AHTS Horizon Arctic as the surface support vessel.

During one unsuccessful dive of 2021, Titan became stuck at the bottom of the ocean for at least four hours because of mechanical problems, and was unable to ascend to the surface and unable to reach the Titanic wreckage. Passengers aboard this dive spent 20 hours inside Titan before they reached surface and were able to get out of the submersible. A passenger aboard this dive told the Vancouver Sun in 2023 "I really had a great time on that boat trip, even though we got stuck at the bottom."

=== 2022 ===
In 2022 OceanGate again organized five Titanic excursions. Horizon Arctic again served as the support vessel for the planned dives.

Passenger Alan Estrada reached Titanic aboard Titan on 2 July 2022 and documented the experience on his YouTube channel. Estrada described his dive as "one of the more successful ones" as the vessel was able to quickly navigate to the Titanic wreckage and spent 4 hours exploring it. Reporter David Pogue and crew members from CBS News took part in OceanGate's fourth Titanic excursion of 2022, which took place between 9 and 17 July. Pogue boarded Titan but his dive to Titanic was cancelled. The other dive that took place during Pogue's excursion did not reach Titanic either because of technical malfunctions.

=== 2023 ===
Wreck expert Paul-Henri "P.H." Nargeolet, who was also onboard, told me he wasn't worried about what would happen if the structure of the Titan itself were damaged when at the bottom of the ocean. "Under that pressure, you'd be dead before you knew there was a problem." He said it with a smile.

— as recounted by Arnie Weissmann, in Travel Weekly article published June 22, 2023

For the 2023 survey expedition, OceanGate secured MV Polar Prince as its support vessel and planned to begin excursions in May. According to Rush, the support ship was changed because the cost of leasing Horizon Arctic had increased to $200,000 per week. Because of the switch to Polar Prince, a platform known as the Launch and Recovery System (LARS), needed to be towed to the site, rather than carried on board. Journalist Arnie Weissmann took part in the second excursion of 2023, called "Mission 2" by OceanGate, which was set to depart on 20 May 2023. During Weissmann's excursion no dives reaching Titanic took place. YouTuber Jake Koehler was a member of Mission 3, which also did not dive due to poor weather, a ghost net wrapping around some of the sub's parts, and the motor controllers malfunctioning. He vlogged his experience onboard and uploaded it online.

== Implosion ==
On 18 June 2023, during the first planned dive of the year, contact with the Titan was lost during the crew's descent to the wreckage of Titanic, about 320 nautical miles (370 mi; 590 km) south-southeast off the coast of Newfoundland, Canada. The submersible was carrying tourists Hamish Harding, Shahzada Dawood, his son Suleman Dawood, crew member and Titanic expert Paul-Henri Nargeolet, and OceanGate founder Stockton Rush, who was the submersible's pilot. Several hours later, after the submersible failed to resurface at the expected time, the Polar Prince reported the situation to the United States Coast Guard. Extensive search and rescue efforts commenced.

== After the implosion ==
On 22 June 2023, it was confirmed that Titan had imploded, probably at the time that communication was lost during the descent, instantly killing all five occupants on board. The exact cause was investigated. Experts said that the carbon fiber used to construct the hull could have cracked under deep-sea pressure.

On 5 August 2025, the US Coast Guard released its final report from the Marine Board of Investigation, calling the Titan disaster a 'preventable tragedy'.

The National Transportation Safety Board (NTSB) investigation into the hull failure was still ongoing as of the release of the USCG final report. There are also reports of federal investigations into OceanGate regarding fraud.

=== Reactions, investigations and documentaries ===
The implosion became widely discussed on social media as the story developed, and inspired grimly humorous Internet memes that ridiculed the submersible's deficient construction, OceanGate's perceived poor safety record, and the individuals who died. The memes were criticized as insensitive, with David Pogue regarding such media as "inappropriate and a little bit sick". Social media drew attention to the 1898 novella Futility, or The Wreck of the Titan, which also centered on the loss of a water vessel named the Titan, and was said to have predicted the Titanic's sinking at the time. James Cameron, who directed the 1997 movie Titanic, visited the Titanic wreck 33 times, and piloted Deepsea Challenger to the bottom of the Mariana Trench, said he was "struck by the similarity" between the submersible's implosion and the events that resulted in the Titanic disaster. He noted that both disasters seemed preventable, and were caused indirectly by someone deliberately ignoring safety warnings from others. Cameron criticized the choice of carbon-fibre composite construction of the pressure vessel, saying it has "no strength in compression" when subject to the immense pressures at depth. Cameron said that pressure hulls should be made out of contiguous materials such as steel, titanium, ceramic, or acrylic, and that the wound carbon fibre of Titan's hull had seemed like a bad idea to him from the beginning. He stated that it was long known that composite hulls were vulnerable to microscopic water ingress, delamination, and progressive failure over time. He also criticized Rush's real-time monitoring of the hull as an inadequate solution that would do little to prevent an implosion. Cameron expressed regret for not being more outspoken about these concerns before the accident, and criticized what he termed "false hopes" being presented to the victims' families; he and his colleagues realized early on that for communication and tracking (the latter housed in a separate pressure vessel, with its own battery) to be lost simultaneously, the cause was almost certainly a catastrophic implosion.

On 23 June 2023, both the Canadian and the United States federal governments announced that they were beginning investigations of the implosion. They were joined by authorities from France (Bureau d'Enquêtes sur les Événements de Mer, BEAmer) and the United Kingdom (Marine Accident Investigation Branch, MAIB) by 25 June; the final report will be issued to the International Maritime Organization (IMO). The investigation by the U.S. Coast Guard highlighted serious safety concerns, criticizing OceanGate's operational practices and identifying a "toxic workplace culture" in which safety warnings were suppressed. The report concluded that Rush "exhibited negligence that contributed to the deaths" and created a false impression of the submersible's safety. The exact cause was investigated. Experts said that the carbon fiber used to construct the hull could have cracked under deep-sea pressure. On 5 August 2025, the US Coast Guard released its final report from the Marine Board of Investigation, calling the Titan disaster a 'preventable tragedy'. The National Transportation Safety Board (NTSB) investigation into the hull failure was still ongoing as of the release of the USCG final report. There are also reports of federal investigations into OceanGate regarding fraud.

The 2024 American Broadcasting Company (ABC) special Truth and Lies: Fatal Dive to the Titanic examined the submersible implosion of the Titan. In February 2024, a movie inspired by the events of the Titan submersible incident, titled Locker, was announced. In March 2024, a two-part documentary by ITN Productions, Minute by Minute: The Titan Sub Disaster, was broadcast by UK's Channel 5. The documentary included interviews with the Canadian air crew that searched the surface, Edward Cassano of the Pelagic remotely-operated vehicle team that found the wreckage, and members of the Marine Technology Society who had warned OceanGate about their deviation from accepted engineering practices in 2018. Analysis of the mysterious "banging" sounds that seemed to indicate the occupants were still alive was a main feature of the first part. In May 2025, the BBC and Discovery Channel aired Implosion: The Titanic Sub Disaster, a documentary co-produced along with other international broadcasters. It features exclusive access to the U.S. Coast Guard's investigation, previously unseen footage, expert interviews, and archive footage of an interview with Rush and of a Titan dive filmed for a possible TV feature under consideration by Discovery Channel host Josh Gates. The film includes a video recorded aboard the Titan's support vessel that appears to capture the sound of the implosion, during which Wendy Rush, Stockton's wife, is heard asking, "What was that bang?" The documentary questions OceanGate's safety practices and whether the tragedy could have been prevented.

On June 11, 2025, Netflix released the documentary Titan: The OceanGate Disaster. The documentary primarily examines a number of issues, such as Rush, OceanGate's manufacturing and operating practices prior to the Titan implosion as well as the cause, response, and aftermath to the Titan implosion. The documentary includes interviews with former OceanGate employees, whistleblowers, and government officials. A central point made in the documentary is Rush's repeated refusal to have the Titan submersible officially certified by an independent third party, a process known as "classing". Former employees explain that Rush viewed regulation as stifling innovation and an obstacle to his vision. Despite issuing legal disclaimers, Rush marketed the Titan as "safer than flying in a helicopter" to potential customers, a claim directly contradicted by internal warnings and engineering flaws. The documentary details how Rush fired employees who challenged his decisions or raised safety issues. The most prominent example was the firing of David Lochridge, OceanGate's Director of Marine Operations, after he submitted a scathing report on the submersible's dangerous, unproven carbon fiber hull. The documentary uses internal records to show that the Titan's carbon fiber hull experienced a "loud bang" on a previous dive, and subsequent dives revealed increasing instances of fiber breakage. Rush, however, ignored these alarms and told passengers to "not worry about it" if they heard them. The documentary highlights Rush's decision to build the hull out of carbon fiber, a lighter and cheaper material than the industry-standard titanium or steel. Experts who spoke in the documentary condemned this choice, calling the material "highly unstable" for deep-sea use. Rush had passengers sign extensive waivers and classified them as "mission specialists" rather than tourists. The documentary explains this as a legal maneuver to circumvent safety regulations that would apply to paying passengers.
