= DeepFlight Merlin =

3-seater wet sub diver propulsion vehicle

Class overview
- Builders: Hawkes Ocean Technologies
- Operators: Virgin Oceanic
- Preceded by: DeepFlight Super Falcon
- Completed: 1
- Active: 1

General characteristics
- Type: Submarine
- Displacement: 750 kg (1,650 lb)
- Length: 4.6 m (15 ft)
- Beam: 3.0 m (9.8 ft)
- Speed: 5 knots
- Capacity: 3
- Crew: 1

DeepFlight Merlin is a personal submarine by Hawkes Ocean Technologies, part of the DeepFlight line of submersibles. The positively buoyant submersible was designed by Graham Hawkes. The Merlin was the first winged open-cockpit submarine (a wet sub) available on the market, and first three-man submarine in the "aero submarine" class, representing a major advance in scuba diving technology.

It travels up to 5 knots, has an operating time of one hour, and an open cockpit, requiring the use of scuba gear by occupants, and giving them 360-degree views of the space around them. The sub carries three, two passengers and one pilot. The occupants have "windshields" to protect them from the water stream. It is capable of hydrobatic maneuvers and 360-degree turns. It weighs 750 kg, is 4.6 m long, 3.0 m wide, 1.2 m tall, and runs off battery power. It is available as either a single-seater or two-seater. The design work on the sub started in July 2009.

== Necker Nymph ==
The first example of the Merlin, the Necker Nymph, was sold to Richard Branson's Virgin Hotel Group. It cost US$670,000 and is operated by Virgin Aquatic from the 32-metre yacht Necker Belle, which is based at the Virgin Limited Edition resort Necker Island in the British Virgin Islands.

== See also ==
- Innespace Seabreacher
