= Cheyenne (catamaran) =

Catamaran owned by Steve Fossett

- Other names: PlayStation
- Designer(s): G. Morelli, P. Melvin
- Builder: Cookson; Auckland, New Zealand
- Launched: 1998
- Owner(s): Virgin Oceanic (2011–)

Racing career
- Skippers: Steve Fossett

Specifications
- Type: Catamaran
- Displacement: 27 t (27 long tons; 30 short tons)
- Length: 37.90 m (124.3 ft) (LOA)
- Beam: 18.20 m (59.7 ft)
- Mast height: 41 m (135 ft)
- Sail area: 1,036 m^{2} (11,150 sq ft) (upwind); 644 m^{2} (6,930 sq ft) (downwind)
- Crew: 12

Cheyenne, formerly known as PlayStation is a large catamaran created for the 2000 around the world race known as The Race. Like its competitors, Cheyenne was created for sheer speed, pushing the state of the art in materials, construction, and operation. PlayStation was skippered and owned by Steve Fossett. It is owned by and operated by Virgin Oceanic's co-founder Chris Welsh.

== Career ==
Construction of the boat was by Mick Cookson of Cookson Boatworks in Auckland, New Zealand in 1998 to 1999. The boats construction was made from pre-preg carbon fiber laminates in various orientations, with a 38 mm aluminum honeycomb core.

After breaking the 24-hour distance record (583 NM), PlayStation suffered a fire while being prepared for shipping to the US. The cause of the fire was the over-charging of the NiMH batteries, and the damage from the fire required that 26' of the starboard hull be replaced. A portion of the hull was created at the builders which was grafted to the original bow and stern leaving virtually no evidence of the fire.

PlayStation was originally launched with hulls of 105 feet (32 m) and was lengthened to 125 feet (38 m) LOA in August 2000, to minimize pitching. At 105 feet (32 m) PlayStation was overpowered and the possibility of a pitch pole in a yacht this size warranted the refit. Maximum beam remains at 60 feet (18 m) and max draft with daggerboards down is 14.7 feet (4.5 m). The boat carries 7,274 square feet (676 m^{2}) of sail upwind, and a total of 11,631 square feet (1,081 m^{2}) downwind from her 147.5 foot carbon mast.

In The Race, PlayStation suffered mechanical failures from the start and withdrew from the competition on Day 16.

In 2001 Fossett and his crew crossed the Atlantic Ocean in 4 days and 17 hours establishing a new world record for crossing the Atlantic Ocean on a sail vessel.

In 2006, Cheyenne's mast broke due to severe weather off the coast of Argentina. Cheyenne was converted to a power catamaran and underwent significant changes and became the mothership for Virgin Oceanic's deep sea exploration mission called 5 Dives.

In 2009 Cheyenne was purchased by Chris Welsh from the estate of Steve Fossett. Plans are to launch a deep sea submarine to carry passengers to extreme ocean depths. The deep sea adventure will be supported by Cheyenne, and will use the HOT DeepFlight Challenger sub to plumb the depths of the world's oceans to full depth. Both of these were owned by Steve Fossett, who had modified the racing catamaran to become the mothership to his oceanic dive record attempt. The submarine seats one person, and is currently the only crewed submersible capable of reaching the deepest part of the oceans. As at 2014 the deep sea expedition supporting bey Cheyenne was still in the process of being planned.

== Records ==
- Transatlantic record of in a time of 4 days, 17 hours, 28 minutes, and 6 seconds in October 2001, with a total distance of 2,925 nautical miles (5,417 km) at an average speed of 25.78 knots.
- The 24 hour distance run of 687.17 nautical miles (1,272.64 km) at an average speed of 28.63 knots in 2001.
- The round the world sailing record of 58 days 9 hours 32 minutes and 45 seconds in 2004. PlayStation was renamed Cheyenne in 2003, prior to setting this record.

The former records have all been broken.

== See also ==
- List of large sailing yachts
