= Necker Nymph =

DeepFlight Merlin class positively-buoyant open-cockpit 3-seater wet sub

History
- Name: Necker Nymph
- Owner: Virgin Limited Edition
- Operator: Virgin Oceanic
- Builder: Hawkes Ocean Technologies
- Cost: £415,000

General characteristics
- Class & type: DeepFlight Merlin
- Displacement: 750 kg
- Length: 4.6 m
- Beam: 3.0 m
- Capacity: 3
- Crew: 1

The Necker Nymph is a submersible vehicle operated by Virgin Aquatic from the 32-metre yacht Necker Belle, which is based at the Virgin Limited Edition resort Necker Island in the British Virgin Islands.

The Necker Nymph is the initial example of the DeepFlight Merlin class of positively-buoyant open-cockpit wet subs manufactured by Hawkes Ocean Technologies. It relies on hydrodynamic forces for anti-lift force. It is 4.5 metres long, capable of 360-degree "hydrobatic" manoeuvres, can dive up to 40 metres underwater, and seats one pilot and two passengers in an open cockpit (necessitating wearing scuba gear). Occupants have a "windscreen" to protect them from the water's slipstream.
