= DOER Marine =

American marine technology company

Deep Ocean Exploration and Research
- Founded: 1992
- Founder: Sylvia Earle
- Headquarters: Alameda, California
- Key people: Liz Taylor (Pres/CEO); Ian Griffiths (Ops); Tony Lawson (Engr)
- Website: doermarine.com

DOER Marine (Deep Ocean Exploration and Research) is a marine technology company established in 1992 by oceanographer Sylvia Earle, based in Alameda, California.

== History ==
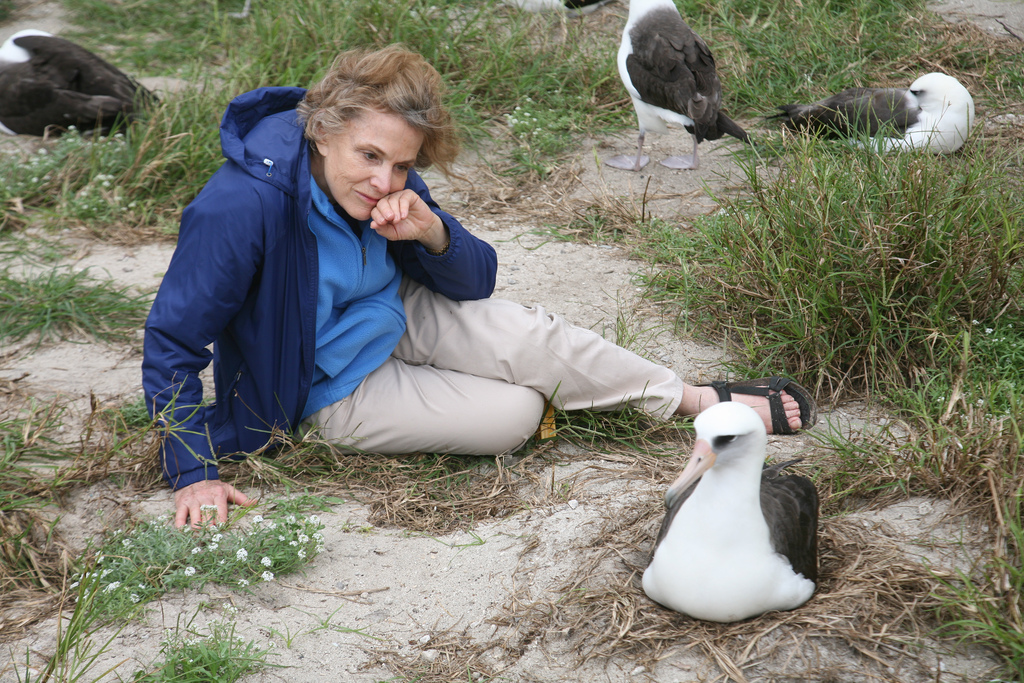
Sylvia Earle, photographed with Wisdom (2012)

Earle and submersible designer Graham Hawkes founded Deep Ocean Engineering (DOE) in 1982; DOE's products included Phantom, an uncrewed submersible, Deep Rover, a one-person submersible which set a record for deepest solo dive at 1,000 m (3,300 ft), and Deep Flight, designed to descend faster than previous deep-diving submersibles. Later, she left DOE to become the chief scientist at the National Oceanographic and Atmospheric Administration (NOAA) in 1991. Hawkes left DOE and founded Hawkes Ocean Technologies in 1996 to further explore the concepts advanced by Deep Flight.

Earle left NOAA at about the same time DOER was founded in 1992; she intended to continue work on the Ocean Everest project, which she had started with Hawkes at DOE; Ocean Everest aimed to descend to Challenger Deep in the Mariana Trench using the planned Deep Flight-2 crewed submersible. DOER Marine was established in 1992, which specializes in crewed and robotic submersibles, performing design, operation, support, and consulting.

After Earle became the Explorer in Residence at the National Geographic Society in 1995, corporate management was assumed by Earle's daughter, Liz Taylor (President / CEO), supported by Ian Griffith (Director of Marine Operations) and Tony Lawson (Director of Engineering). The company moved into Hangar 41 of the former Naval Air Station Alameda in 2003.

== Products and services ==
=== Submersibles ===
While he was at DOE, Hawkes had built two prototype Deep Flight-1 submersibles, although finding funding for these was challenging. An earlier concept for an Ocean Everest submersible included a two-person crew and a carbon fiber hull; DOE stated they intended to have it certified by the American Bureau of Shipping with a pressure rating of 30,000 psi (210 MPa; 2,000 atm), giving it a 2:1 factor of safety.

DOER worked with Nuytco Research and the National Geographic Society for the Sustainable Seas Expeditions, which were undertaken between 1997 and 2002. DOER provided training for pilots of the Nuytco Deep Worker and DOE Deep Rover submersibles. David Riordan visited DOER in 2003, asking how he could raise awareness of the ocean's declining fish populations; together with Earle, they devised Project Deepsearch, which would raise funds to develop new submersibles capable of descending to the full depth of the ocean by selling video games, films, and other media.

The resulting Deepsearch crewed submersible was among the competitors to return to Challenger Deep, developed by DOER with financial support from Google's Eric Schmidt. Other competitors included Steve Fossett (with DeepFlight Challenger, backed by Richard Branson's Virgin Group), James Cameron (who would eventually claim the X Prize in 2012 with Deepsea Challenger), and Triton Submarines (with Triton). DOER built the manipulator arm for Deepsea Challenger and tested its lower hull.

Deepsearch was intended to carry a crew of two or three; like the prior Deep Flight prototypes, it was designed to be positively buoyant, with flow over winglets providing descending force, allowing it to reach the bottom in 90 minutes. In addition to the hydrodynamic winglets, DOER was investigating the use of a thick glass spherical pressure hull and floatation using packed ceramic spheres rather than syntactic foam. Deepsearch was undergoing scale model testing when Schmidt pulled his funding in 2009 and the project was suspended.

A complimentary submersible named Ocean Explorer was being developed at the same time as Deepsearch, designed to replace lockout diving functionality lost after the Johnson Sea Link submersibles retired. Ocean Explorer had a targeted maximum depth of 5,000 m (16,000 ft)

=== ROVs ===
DOER also has developed several remotely operated underwater vehicles (ROVs), including H6500, which later was developed by Pelagic Research Services into ROV Odysseus 6K.

=== Mapping ===
In 2009, DOER coordinated efforts from multiple agencies supplying underwater map data, resulting in the Ocean module of Google Earth, released in version 5.0.
