= Necker Island =

Necker Island may refer to:

- Necker Island (British Virgin Islands), an island in the British Virgin Islands, owned by Richard Branson
- Necker Island (Hawaii), an island in the Northwestern Hawaiian Islands
