= DeepFlight Challenger =

Deep-submergence vehicle, owned by Virgin Oceanic

DeepFlight Challenger is a one-person submersible built with the intention of reaching the Challenger Deep, utilizing DeepFlight technology from Hawkes Ocean Technologies. The submersible is owned by Virgin Oceanic.

== History ==
The submersible was designed by Graham Hawkes and Hawkes Ocean Technologies (HOT). It was originally ordered by Steve Fossett for an attempt on the Challenger Deep, to become the first solo dive there. Planning for the submersible started in 2000. It was put on the order sheet in 2005, with a depth capability of 11,000 metres (37,000 ft). The craft was named Challenger by Fossett after the Challenger Deep. At the time of the order, this would have doubled the depth that a single-place sub would be capable of going. It was to have been a "secret project" of Fossett's to be the first to solo the Challenger Deep, and was secret at the time of his death in 2007. The project was put on hold when Fossett died, and locked up in a warehouse at Hawkes Ocean Technologies, by the then owners, Fossett's estate, but was later revived when Chris Welsh of Deep Sub LLC bought the unfinished sub and restarted the program in 2010. Welsh had purchased the sub and the yacht Cheyenne from the Fossett estate for around $1 million. Virgin Oceanic came in as sponsors a year later in 2011. At the time of Fossett's death, the sub had been almost finished, only four weeks from dive tests and delivery. This sub is the first deep-diving sub to be constructed with a pressure hull (central tube portion) of carbon fibre composite, built by Spencer Composites for HOT. Its carbon fiber design would later influence the tube for the sub Titan, which imploded. Simulations showed that the most likely cause of the implosion was failure of the carbon fiber hull.

Hawkes Ocean Technologies is a privately-held company based in the San Francisco Bay area focused on the design and construction of some of the world's most advanced manned ocean exploration vehicles.

== Design ==
The submersible uses composite technology to create a lightweight sub with great depth capabilities. The view dome is made from quartz, while the rest of the pressure hull uses carbon/epoxy composites. The interface between dome and hull is by bonded titanium rings. The sub has a 24-hour endurance, 3 knots (5.6 km/h) bottom speed, and 110 m/min (350 ft/min) dive rate. The sub uses syntactic foam for buoyancy, and is positively buoyant when no ballast is attached. The submersible does not have a temperature control system for the cabin, so interior temperature eventually falls to water temperature. The sub weighs 3,600 kilograms (8,000 lb), and does not need a dedicated mothership. It has a 15-nautical-mile (28 km) range, 6 knots (11 km/h) maximum speed, and 3-axis freedom of motion. It uses LED lighting instead of arc lights, and has laser "feeler" beams to aid navigation. The sub can dive to the bottom of the ocean and get back to the surface in 5 hours. The design drew from DeepFlight II, another Hawkes Ocean Technologies full depth submersible. The pressure hull is rated to withstand 140 MPa (20,000 psi) (more than the 110 MPa (16,000 psi) at the bottom of the Mariana Trench). The sub is smaller than James Cameron's Deepsea Challenger. Challenger represents the third generation of DeepFlight technology, one generation behind the DeepFlight Super Falcon.

== Test program ==
May 2007
Penn State Applied Research Laboratory Building; Pressure test of the pressure hull to Mariana Trench like pressures. Passed test, except for a crack in the view dome due to a manufacturing defect.
November 2007
cancelled tests, in the wake of Steve Fossett's death.
February 2012
Alameda Naval Air Station (Oakland, California, US); Ballast system was tested. Submerged battery and engine testing, while crewed.

== Dive program ==
=== Five Dives project ===
Richard Branson and Chris Welsh of Virgin Oceanic planned on using DeepFlight Challenger to reach the deepest point of each of the world's five oceans, the Mariana Trench of the Pacific Ocean (11,034 m or 36,201 ft), the Puerto Rico Trench of the Atlantic Ocean (8,605 m or 28,232 ft), the Diamantina Trench of the Indian Ocean (8,047 m or 26,401 ft), South Sandwich Trench of the Southern Ocean (7,235 m or 23,737 ft), and Molloy Deep of the Arctic Ocean (5,608 m or 18,399 ft). The Cheyenne yacht was to have been used as the mothership for the dive efforts.

It was planned that Branson would pilot the sub to the Puerto Rico Trench, while Chris Welsh would pilot it for the Mariana Trench dive. Virgin Oceanic had hoped to be the first team to solo to the bottom of the Mariana Trench, and first team to return to the Challenger Deep since the Bathyscaphe Trieste, the first submersible to dive to the Challenger Deep. However, James Cameron's Deepsea Challenge project beat them to it in March 2012. There has been an undeclared race on to return to the Challenger Deep between four teams, Cameron's, Virgin Oceanic's, Google-Schmidt/DOER's, and Triton submersibles'. The attempt on Challenger Deep had been announced in April 2011.

Based on testing at high pressure, the DeepFlight Challenger was determined to be suitable only for a single dive, not the repeated uses that had been planned as part of Virgin Oceanic service. As such, in 2014, Virgin Oceanic scrapped plans for the five dives project using the DeepFlight Challenger, as originally conceived, putting plans on hold until more suitable technologies are developed.

== Similar efforts ==
As of February 2012, several other vehicles are under development to reach the same depths. The groups developing them include:

- Deepsea Challenge, a program created by James Cameron and National Geographic, using the submersible Deepsea Challenger, that carries a crew of one and is the first and only one-person crewed vehicle to descend to the Challenger Deep.
- Triton Submarines LLC, a Florida-based company that designs and manufactures private submersibles, whose vehicle, Triton 36000/3, will carry a crew of three to the seabed in 120 minutes.
- Deep Ocean Exploration and Research (DOER) Marine, a San Francisco Bay Area based marine technology company established in 1992, that is developing a vehicle, Deepsearch (and Ocean Explorer HOV Unlimited), with some support from Google's Eric Schmidt with which a crew of two or three will take 90 minutes to reach the seabed, as the program Deep Search.
