= Mermaid Sapphire =

History

Panama
- Name: Mermaid Sapphire
- Owner: Mermaid Offshore Services Ltd.
- Port of registry: Panama City, Panama
- Builder: PT Jaya Asiatic Shipyard, Batam, Indonesia
- Launched: 2009
- Identification: IMO number: 9563859; Call sign: 3FJX5; MMSI number: 352890000
- Status: In service

General characteristics
- Type: ROV & air diving support vessel
- Tonnage: 2,070 GT; 1,481 DWT
- Length: 63 m (206 ft 8 in) o/a
- Beam: 15 m (49 ft 3 in)
- Draught: 5 m (16 ft 5 in)
- Depth: 6.1 m (20 ft 0 in)
- Installed power: 2 × 470 kW (630 hp) Volvo + 1 × 99 kW (133 hp) Volvo emergency generator
- Propulsion: 2 × 2,575 kW (3,453 hp) Caterpillar CPP; 2 × 515 kW (691 hp) CPP bow thrusters; 2 × 515 kW (691 hp) CPP stern thrusters
- Boats & landing craft carried: SMD Quasar Compact ROV
- Crew: 60

Mermaid Sapphire is an offshore multipurpose vessel. Built in 2009, the ship is used for mostly research and undersea work.

She is a purpose-built ABS Classed DP2 ROV and air diving support vessel, designed for operation of dual deepwater work-class ROV's (Quasar Compact or Triton XLX) plus optional inspection-class ROV. The ROV's are installed on a dedicated raised deck level, leaving all back deck space for project equipment. Mermaid Sapphire is also equipped with state-of-the-art subsea inspection data acquisition and data management systems. A 23-tonne knuckleboom crane, and auxiliary 5-tonne crane are also installed.

On March 26, 2012, she carried Deepsea Challenger to the Challenger Deep where the first solo dive to the bottom of the trench was made.
