= Innespace Seabreacher =

Two-seat watercraft

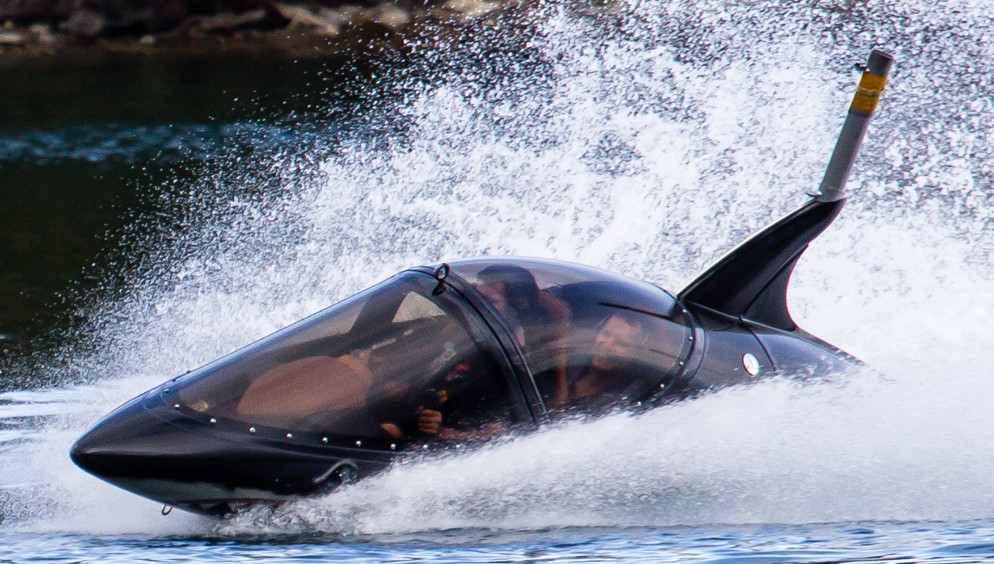

Class overview
- Builders: Innespace
- Preceded by: Innespace Dolphin

General characteristics
- Type: Semi-Submarine
- Displacement: 612 kg (1,349 lb)
- Length: 5.27 m (17.3 ft)
- Beam: 1.0 m (3.3 ft)
- Installed power: 260 bhp (190 kW)
- Propulsion: axial flow jet pump
- Speed: Surface: 47 kn (87 km/h; 54 mph); Underwater: 21 kn (39 km/h; 24 mph)
- Capacity: 2
- Crew: 1

Innespace Seabreacher (or Sea Breacher) is a two-seat semi-submersible personal watercraft "submarine", with a shape based on that of a dolphin, and the ability to imitate a dolphin's movement.

== History ==
The watercraft was designed and developed by two engineers—New Zealander Rob Innes and his partner, American Dan Piazza—who are also the founders of the American company Innespace Inc., which markets, builds, and sells the semisub watercraft to customers. It is the production model of the single-seat Innespace Dolphin. The concept came from VASH (variable attitude submersible hydrofoil), which was invented by Thomas "Doc" Rowe and Dennis "Dusty" Kaiser in 1987 with their boat, Noland Won.

== Specifications ==
The two-seat vessel is powered by an Atkins Rotary Marine engine coupled to a Hurth V-drive transmission.

Seabreachers are available in a wide array of colour specifications and insignias.

== See also ==
- DeepFlight Merlin
