= Necker Belle =

History
- Name: Necker Belle
- Owner: Virgin Limited Edition
- Operator: Virgin Limited Edition
- Builder: CMN

General characteristics
- Length: 32 m (105 ft)
- Beam: 14 m (46 ft)
- Draft: 1.8 m (6 ft)
- Propulsion: Sail
- Speed: 22 knots
- Capacity: 13
- Crew: 5

The Necker Belle is a 105-foot (32 m) private charter catamaran yacht, offered through Virgin Limited Edition and based at the resort Necker Island. The Belle superyacht is one of the few luxury sailing catamarans in the world.

Prior to being purchased by Richard Branson's Virgin, the yacht was called Lady Barbaretta, and cost £5.3 million for Branson to obtain. It required a two-year refit to emerge as the Belle, operates with a crew of seven, and is currently captained by Captain Piers Helm. The refit won the 2010 best new refit at the World Superyacht Awards. The yacht has a top speed in excess of 20 knots, being rare in the world as being able to do so.

The Necker Nymph excursion submersible also operates from the yacht. It is reputedly the first-of-its-kind "aero submarine", buoyant when not under power.
