= Deepsea Challenger =

Submersible that traveled to the Challenger Deep

- Drawing of the DCV1, based on imagery from the Deepsea Challenger website (not to scale)

History

Australia
- Name: Deepsea Challenger
- Builder: Acheron Project Pty Ltd
- Launched: 26 January 2012
- In service: 2012
- Status: On display in touring exhibition

General characteristics
- Type: Bathyscaphe
- Displacement: 11.8 tons
- Length: 7.3 m (24 ft)
- Installed power: Electric motor
- Propulsion: 12 thrusters
- Speed: 3 knots (5.6 km/h; 3.5 mph)
- Endurance: 56 hours
- Test depth: 11,000 m (36,000 ft)
- Complement: 1

Deepsea Challenger (DCV 1) is a 7.3-metre (24 ft) deep-diving submersible designed to reach the bottom of the Challenger Deep, the deepest-known point on Earth. On 26 March 2012, Canadian film director James Cameron piloted the craft to accomplish this goal in the second crewed dive reaching the Challenger Deep. Built in Sydney, Australia, by the research and design company Acheron Project Pty Ltd, Deepsea Challenger includes scientific sampling equipment and high-definition 3-D cameras; it reached the ocean's deepest point after two hours and 36 minutes of descent from the surface.

== Development ==
Deepsea Challenger was built in Australia, in partnership with the National Geographic Society and with support from Rolex, in the Deepsea Challenge program. The construction of the submersible was headed by Australian engineer Ron Allum. Many of the submersible developer team members hail from Sydney's cave-diving fraternity including Allum himself with many years of cave-diving experience.

Working in a small engineering workshop in Leichhardt, Sydney, Allum created new materials including a specialized structural syntactic foam called Isofloat, capable of withstanding the huge compressive forces at the 11-kilometre (6.8 mi) depth. The new foam was unique in that it was more homogeneous and possessed greater uniform strength than other commercially available syntactic foam. With a specific density of about 0.7, it would float in water. The foam is composed of very small hollow glass spheres suspended in an epoxy resin and comprised about 70% of the submersible's volume.

The foam's strength enabled the Deepsea Challenger designers to incorporate thruster motors as part of the infrastructure mounted within the foam but without the aid of a steel skeleton to mount various mechanisms. The foam supersedes gasoline-filled tanks for flotation as used in the historic bathyscaphe Trieste.

Allum also built many innovations, necessary to overcome the limitations of existing products (and presently undergoing development for other deep sea vehicles). These include pressure-balanced oil-filled thrusters; LED lighting arrays; new types of cameras; and fast, reliable penetration communication cables allowing transmissions through the hull of the submersible. Allum gained much of his experience developing the electronic communication used in Cameron's Titanic dives in filming Ghosts of the Abyss, Bismarck and others.

Power systems for the submarine were supplied by lithium batteries that were housed within the foam and can be clearly seen through clear plastic panels. The lithium battery charging systems were designed by Ron Allum.

The submersible contains over 180 onboard systems, including batteries, thrusters, life support, 3D cameras, and LED lighting. These interconnected systems are monitored and controlled by a programmable logic controller (PLC) from Temecula, California-based controls manufacturer Opto 22. During dives, the control system also recorded depth, heading, temperature, pressure, battery status, and other data, and sent it to the support ship at three-minute intervals via an underwater acoustic communication system developed by West Australian company L-3 Nautronix.

The crucial structural elements, such as the backbone and pilot sphere that carried Cameron, were engineered by the Tasmanian company Finite Elements. The design of the interior of the sphere, including fireproofing, condensation management and mounting of control assemblies, was undertaken by Sydney-based industrial design consultancy Design + Industry.

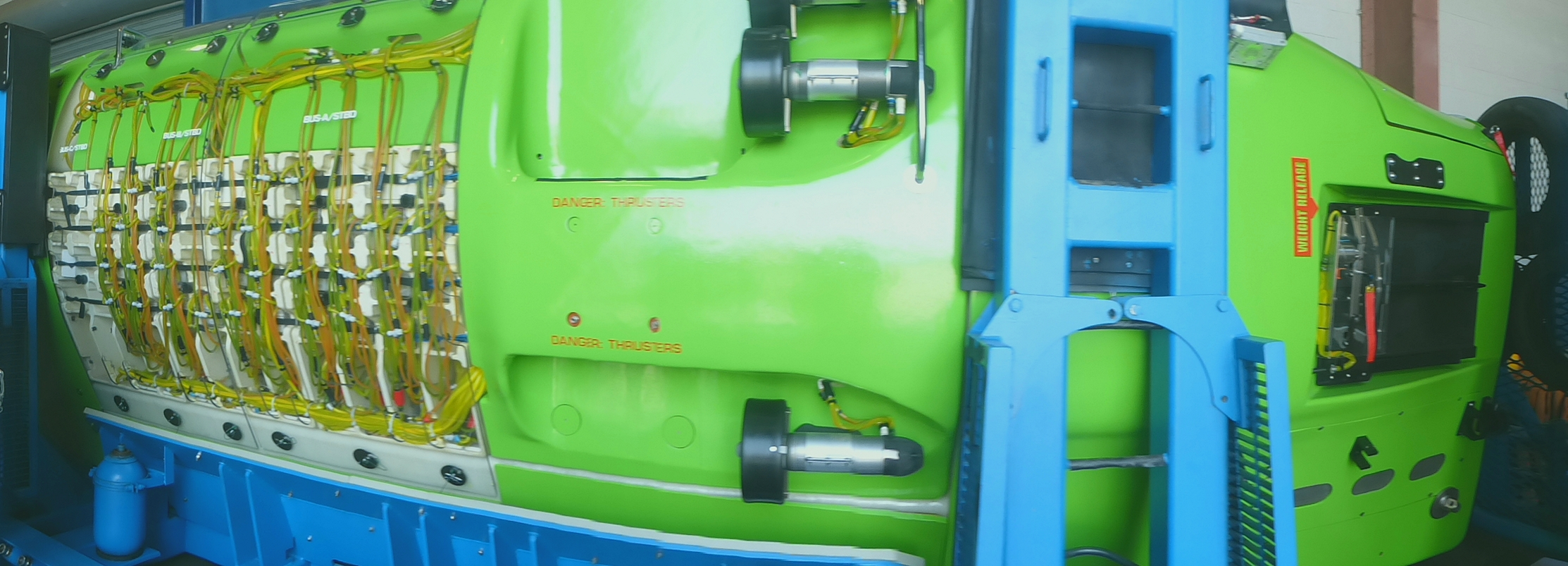
Panorama view of Deepsea Challenger. Left side is the top of the sub.

== Specifications ==
The submersible features a pilot sphere, large enough for only one occupant. The sphere, with steel walls 64 mm (2.5 in) thick, was tested for its ability to withstand the required 114 megapascals (16,500 pounds per square inch) of pressure in a pressure chamber at Pennsylvania State University. The sphere sits at the base of the 11.8-tonne (13.0-short-ton) vehicle. The vehicle operates in a vertical attitude, and carries 500 kg (1,100 lb) of ballast weight that allows it to both sink to the bottom and, when released, rise to the surface. If the ballast weight release system fails, stranding the craft on the seafloor, a backup galvanic release is designed to corrode in salt water in a set period of time, allowing the sub to automatically surface. Deepsea Challenger is less than one-tenth the weight of its predecessor of fifty years, the bathyscaphe Trieste; the modern vehicle also carries dramatically more scientific equipment than Trieste, and is capable of more rapid ascent and descent.

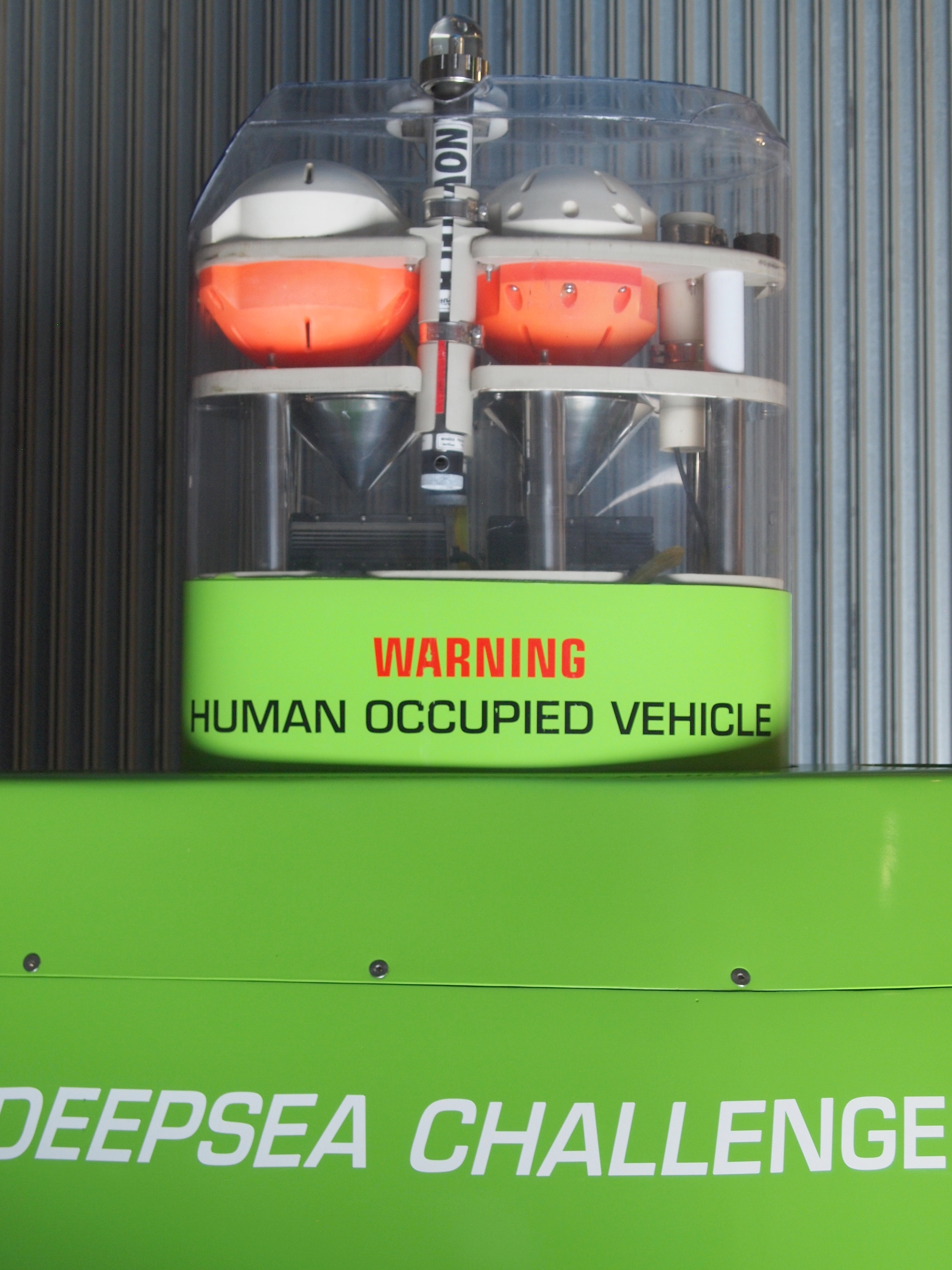
Beacons and antennae, top

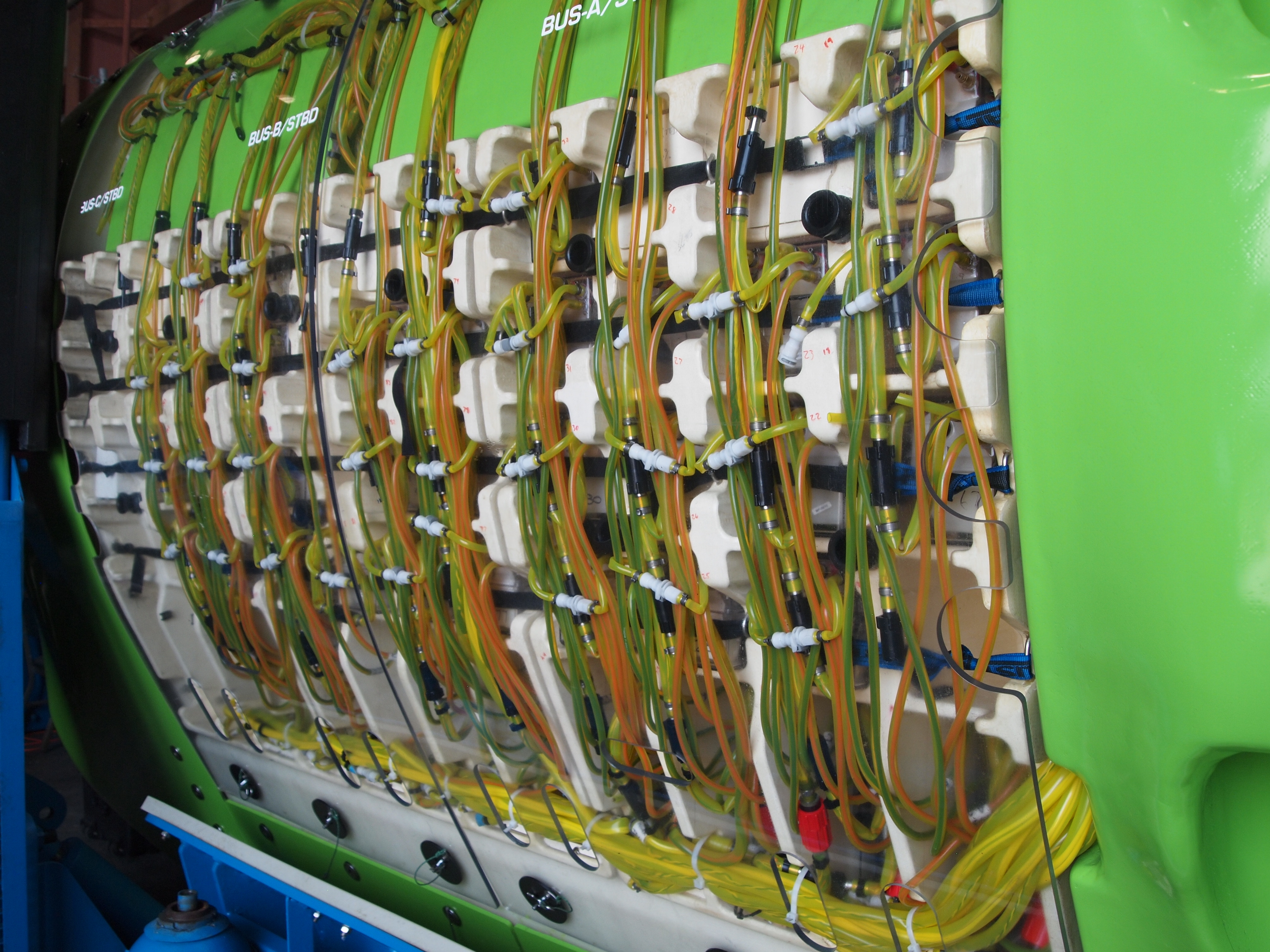
Battery array

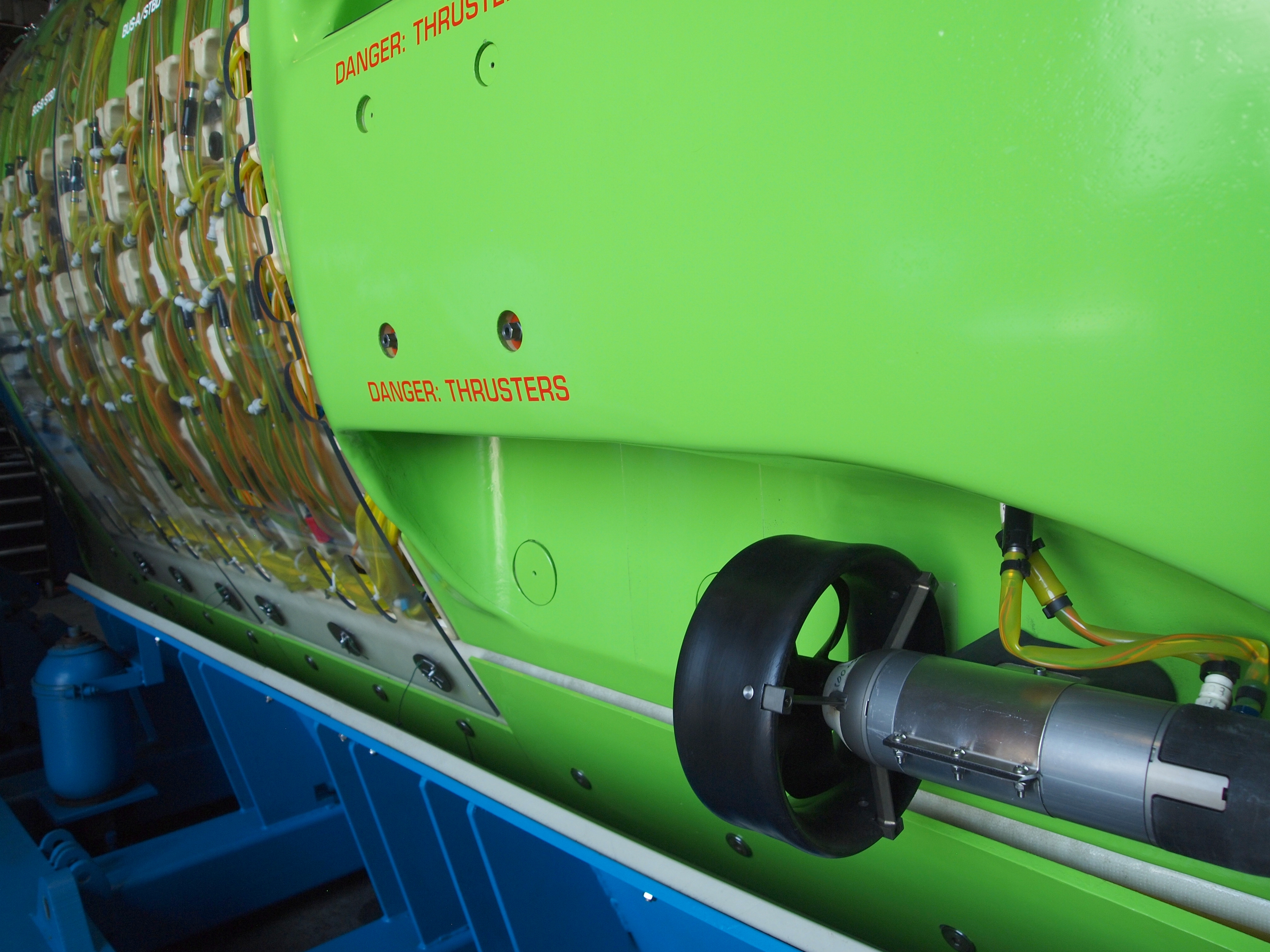
One of the thrusters

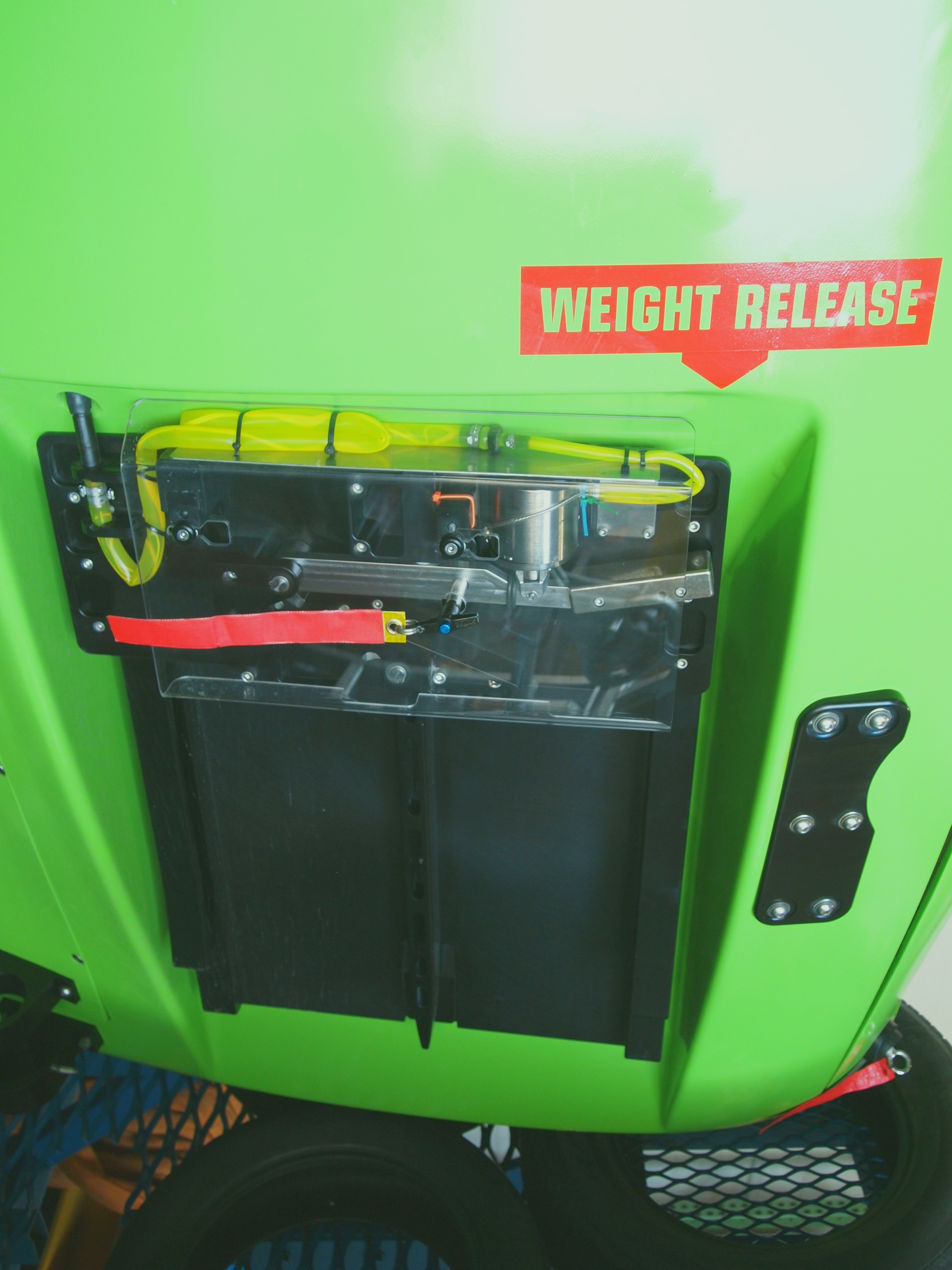
One of two main ballast weights

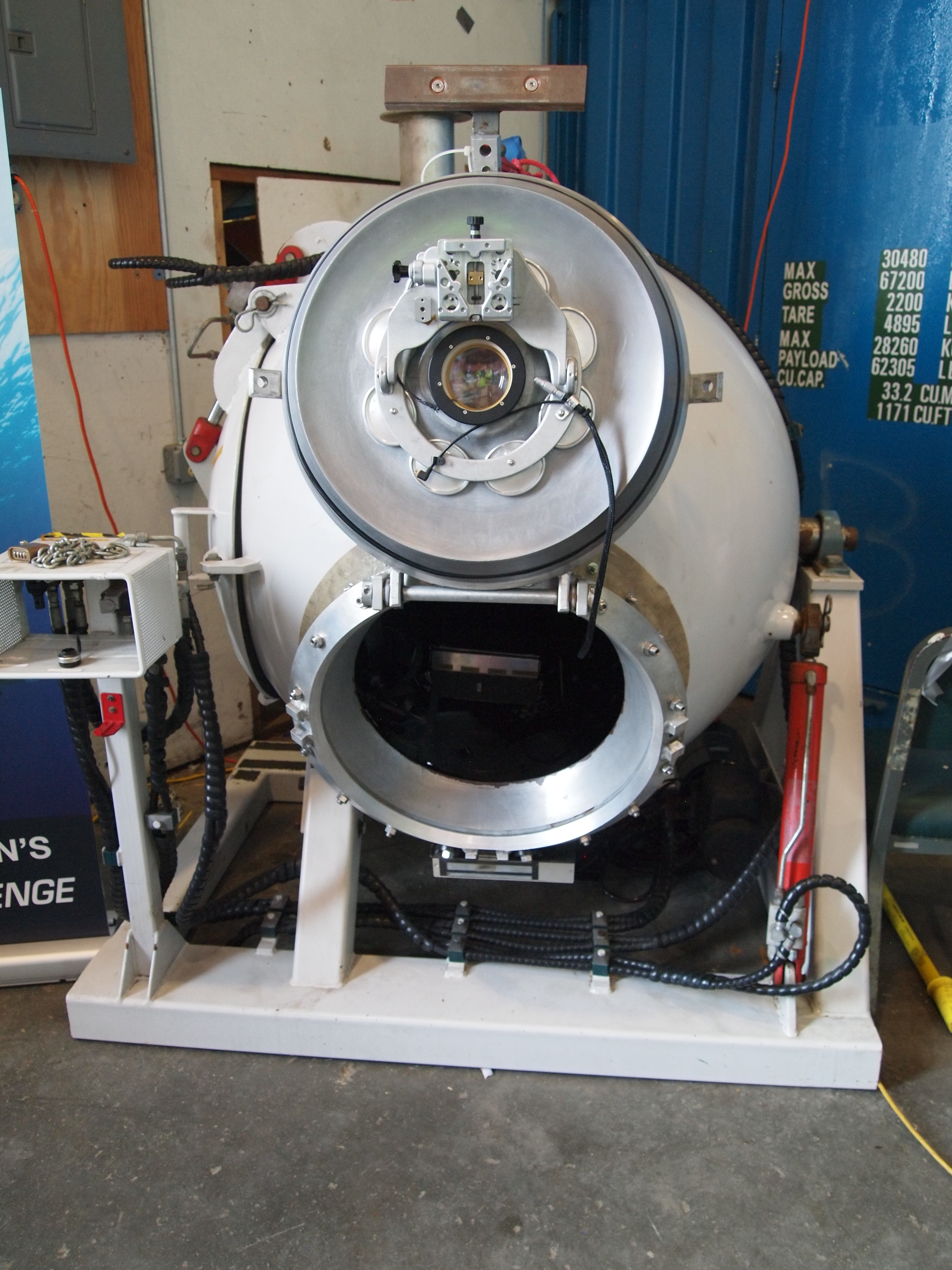
The pilot sphere before installation

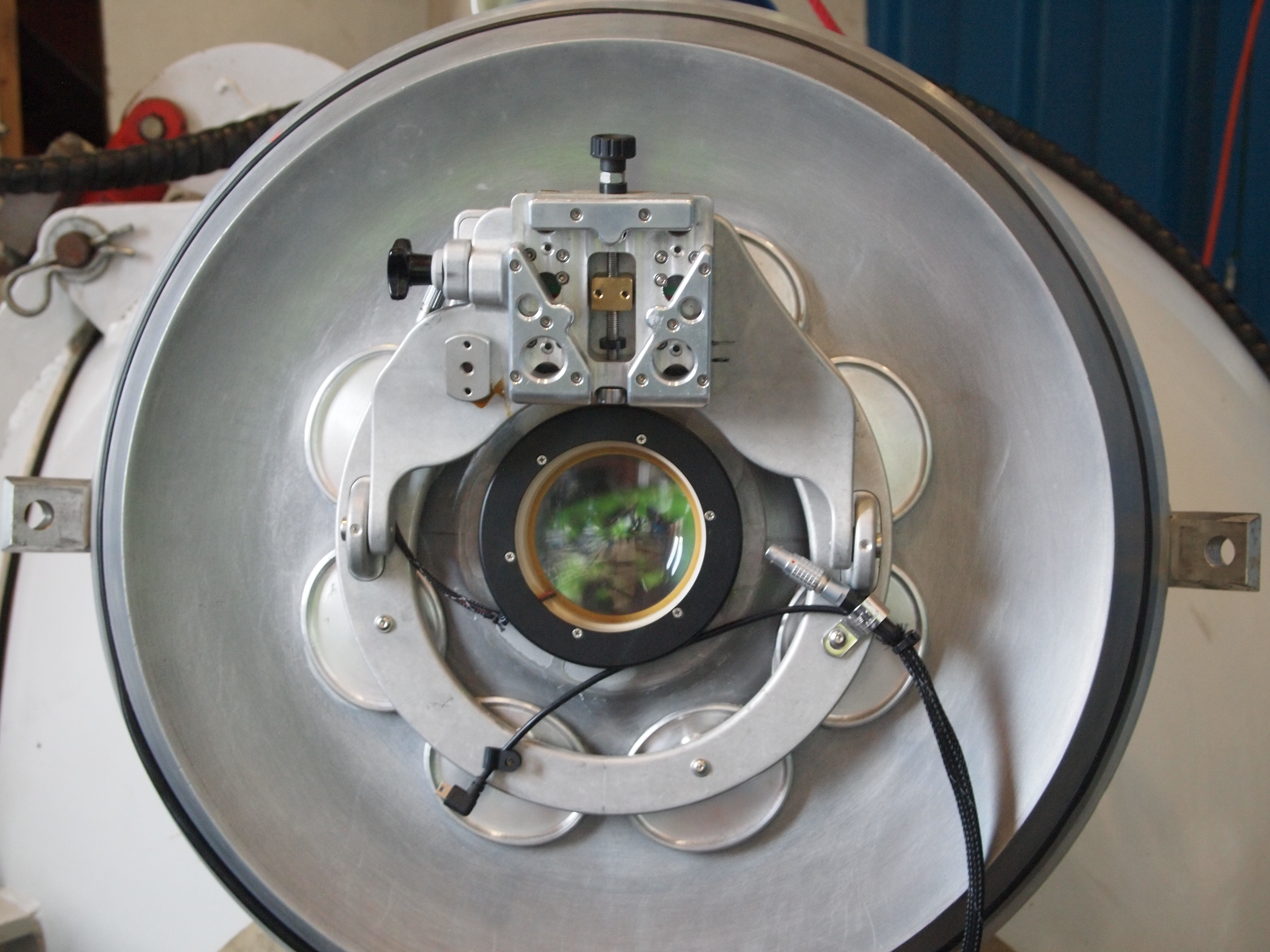
Hatch and viewport

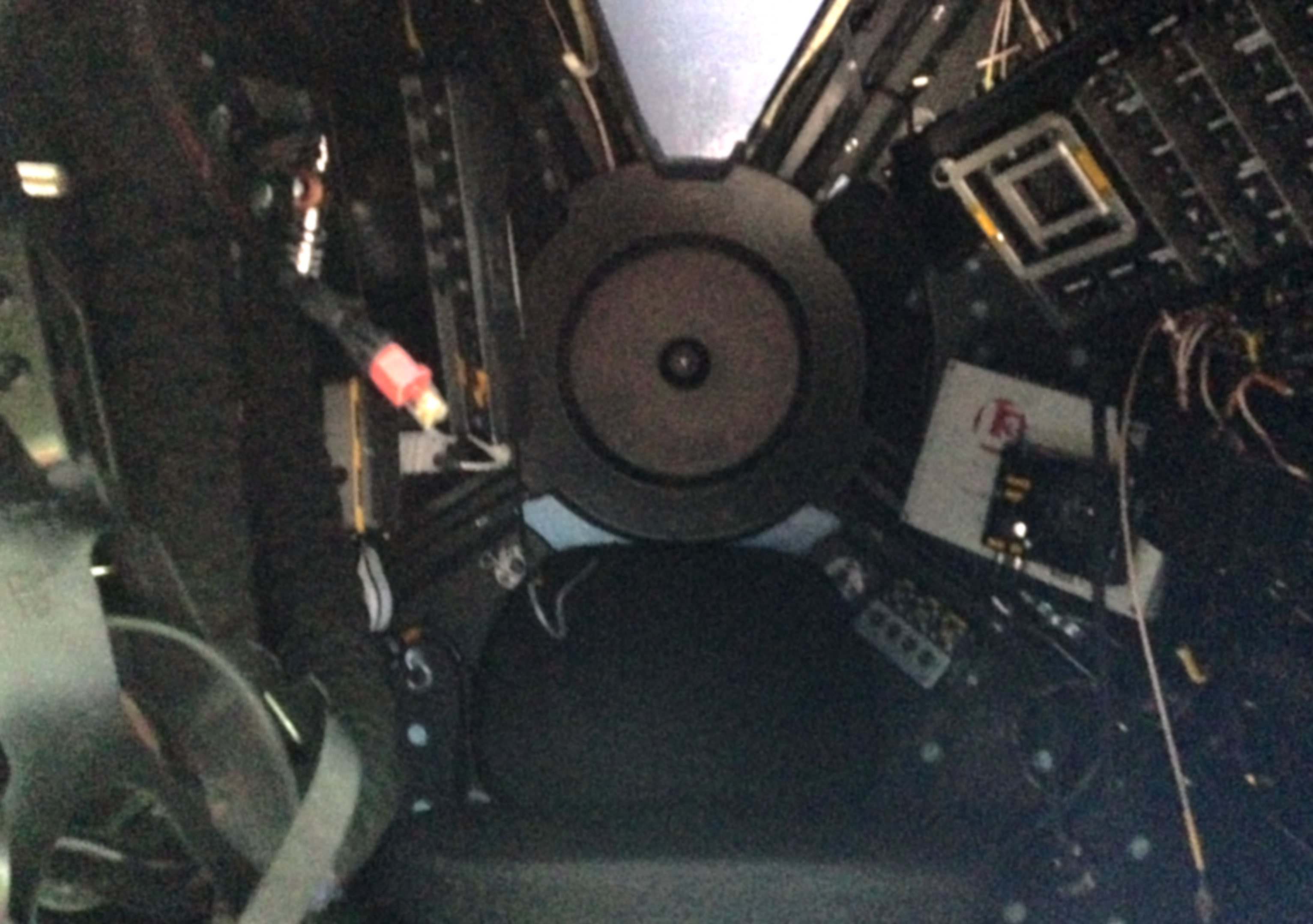
Pilot sphere, interior

== Dives ==
=== Early dives ===
In late January 2012, to test systems, Cameron spent three hours in the submersible while submerged just below the surface in Australia's Sydney Naval Yard. On 21 February 2012, a test dive intended to reach a depth of over 1,000 m (3,300 ft) was aborted after only an hour because of problems with cameras and life support systems. On 23 February 2012, just off New Britain Island, Cameron successfully took the submersible to the ocean floor at 991 m (3,251 ft), where it made a rendezvous with a yellow remote operated vehicle operated from a ship above. On 28 February 2012, during a seven-hour dive, Cameron spent six hours in the submersible at a depth of 3,700 m (12,100 ft). Power system fluctuations and unforeseen currents presented unexpected challenges.

On 4 March 2012, a record-setting dive to more than 7,260 m (23,820 ft) stopped short of the bottom of the New Britain Trench when problems with the vertical thrusters led Cameron to return to the surface. Days later, with the technical problem solved, Cameron successfully took the submersible to the bottom of the New Britain Trench, reaching a maximum depth of 8,221 m (26,972 ft). There, he found a wide plain of loose sediment, anemones, jellyfish, and varying habitats where the plain met the walls of the canyon.

=== Challenger Deep ===
On 18 March 2012, after leaving the testing area in the relatively calm Solomon Sea, the submersible was aboard the surface vessel Mermaid Sapphire, docked in Apra Harbor, Guam, undergoing repairs and upgrades, and waiting for a calm enough ocean to carry out the dive. By 24 March 2012, having left port in Guam days earlier, the submersible was aboard one of two surface vessels that had departed the Ulithi atoll for the Challenger Deep.

On 26 March 2012 it was reported that it had reached the bottom of the Challenger Deep.

These two graphs show James Cameron's Deepsea Challenger's descent and ascent during this record-setting dive – times are in UTC, so the dive started on 25 March and ended on 26 March when UTC times are used, but if Guam times which is UTC+10:00 are used the entire dive occurred on 26 March 2012. Both graphs are based on Paul Allen's tweets during the time when he was monitoring the progress of the dive from the underwater telephone on his yacht, Octopus. There were not as many tweets coming up as there were going down, so there is not as much data for the ascent.

Descent, from the beginning of the dive to arrival at the seafloor, took two hours and 37 minutes, almost twice as fast as the descent of Trieste. A Rolex watch, "worn" on the sub's robotic arm, continued to function normally throughout the dive. Not all systems functioned as planned on the dive: bait-carrying landers were not dropped in advance of the dive because the sonar needed to find them on the ocean floor was not working, and hydraulic system problems hampered the use of sampling equipment. Nevertheless, after roughly three hours on the seafloor and a successful ascent, further exploration of the Challenger Deep with the unique sub was planned for later in the spring of 2012.

=== Records ===
On 26 March 2012, Cameron reached the bottom of the Challenger Deep, the deepest part of the Mariana Trench. The maximum depth recorded during this record-setting dive was 10,908 metres (35,787 ft). Measured by Cameron, at the moment of touchdown, the depth was 10,898 m (35,756 ft). It was the fourth-ever dive to the Challenger Deep and the second crewed dive (with a maximum recorded depth slightly less than that of Trieste's 1960 dive). It was the first solo dive and the first to spend a significant amount of time (three hours) exploring the bottom.

== Subsequent events ==
Deepsea Challenger was donated to Woods Hole Oceanographic Institution for the study of its technological solutions in order to incorporate some of those solutions into other vehicles to advance deep-sea research. On 23 July 2015, it was transported from Woods Hole Oceanographic Institution to Baltimore to be shipped to Australia for a temporary loan. While on a flatbed truck on Interstate 95 in Connecticut, the truck caught fire, resulting in damage to the submersible. The likely cause of the fire was from the truck's brake failure which ignited its rear tires. Connecticut fire officials speculated that it was a total loss to the Deepsea Challenger, and later, an $8.3 million insurance claim was filed. The submersible was transported back to Woods Hole Oceanographic Institution after the fire. As of February 2016, it had been moved to California for repairs, and by 2018, repairs were still underway. Woods Hole Oceanographic Institution's insurer pursued a lawsuit against several parties involved in transporting the submersible and servicing the transport vehicles.

The Deepsea Challenger was exhibited in the Natural History Museum of Los Angeles County from 12 December 2022 to 20 February 2023.

In 2023, the Deepsea Challenger was exhibited until 17 November at the headquarters of the Royal Canadian Geographical Society in Ottawa, Ontario, Canada.

== Similar efforts ==
Several other vessels have been developed to reach the same depths, but not all have done so.

- Triton Submarines, a Florida-based company that designs and manufactures private submarines, whose vehicle, Triton 36000/3, would carry a crew of three to the seabed in 120 minutes. Triton launched DSV Limiting Factor to the bottom of the Marianas trench in August 2019. It has made more than 20 successful crewed dives to Challenger Deep.
- Virgin Oceanic, sponsored by Richard Branson's Virgin Group, took over the development of a submersible originally funded by Steve Fossett (until Fossett's death in September 2007) and designed by Graham Hawkes, DeepFlight Challenger, with which the solo pilot would take 140 minutes to reach the seabed. The Challenger Deep mission for DeepFlight Challenger was scrapped in 2014 after Virgin discovered during pressure testing that it was capable of only a single dive, not the repeated missions planned.
- DOER Marine (Deep Ocean Exploration and Research) announced in 2012 that was developing a vehicle, Deepsearch (and Ocean Explorer HOV Unlimited), with some support from Google's Eric Schmidt. It would have a crew of two or three and take 90 minutes to reach the seabed, as the program Deep Search.
- The Chinese government launched Fendouzhe (奋斗者, Striver) to Challenger Deep on 10 November 2020. Three people were on board, the largest crew to dive Challenger Deep.

== See also ==
- Challenger expedition – Oceanographic research expedition (1872–1876)
- Deep-sea exploration – Investigation of ocean conditions beyond the continental shelf
- Timeline of diving technology – Chronological list of notable events in the history of underwater diving equipment
