= Wet sub =

Ambient pressure diver propulsion vehicle

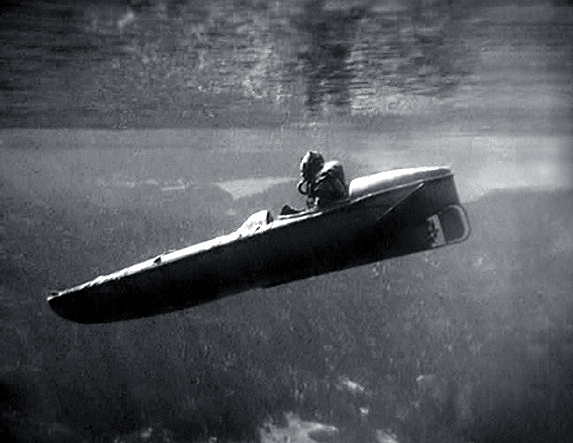
A "Sleeping Beauty" wet sub used by the Royal Navy during World War II

A wet sub is a type of underwater vehicle, either a submarine or a submersible, that does not provide a dry environment for its occupants. It is also described as an underwater vehicle where occupants are exposed to ambient environment during operations. The watercraft is classified as medium-sized or small vessel. This type of submarine differs from other underwater personal transport devices by the fact that it has a hull around it and it is not a "bare bones" design.

Usually, scuba divers ride outside the device as one would ride a motorcycle or in a semi-enclosed opening like a kayak or bobsled, although it can be designed to fully enclose its occupant(s) to reduce drag. An enclosed vehicle may also provide a dry viewing chamber for the occupant(s). The sub is generally propelled by an electric motor and is battery powered. The depth and endurance is typically limited by the requirements of the divers, particularly water temperature and breathable air.

== Military use ==
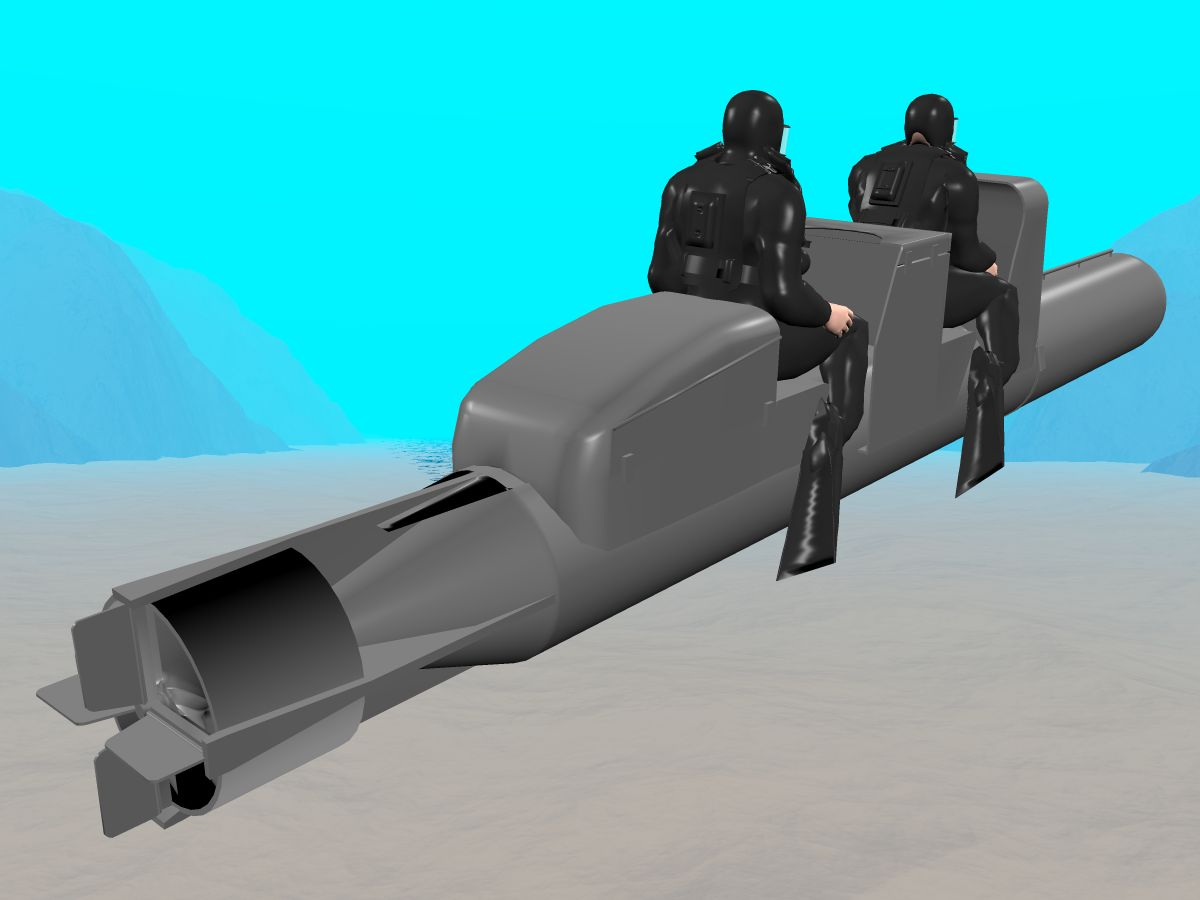
CGI image of a WWII-era British "Chariot manned torpedo" ridden by two frogmen with UBA rebreathers. The warhead is detached from the vehicle for placement upon or under a ship, allowing the operators to use the machine for escape.

Wet subs have been used to transport and deploy special operations forces in waters too shallow for an ordinary submarine, lay mines (particularly for attaching limpet mines directly to a ship), fire torpedoes, or gather intelligence in harbors. They have also been used to plant listening and recording devices on undersea cables in Operation Ivy Bells. For military use, the operator will sometimes use a rebreather device so as not to leave a trail of bubbles. Military wet subs are deployed from a larger submarine or from a surface ship. The SEAL Delivery Vehicle (SDV) used by the United States Navy SEALs and British Special Boat Service is an example that is in use today. The SDV is used to insert Navy SEALs in shallow coastal waters or attack surface ships.

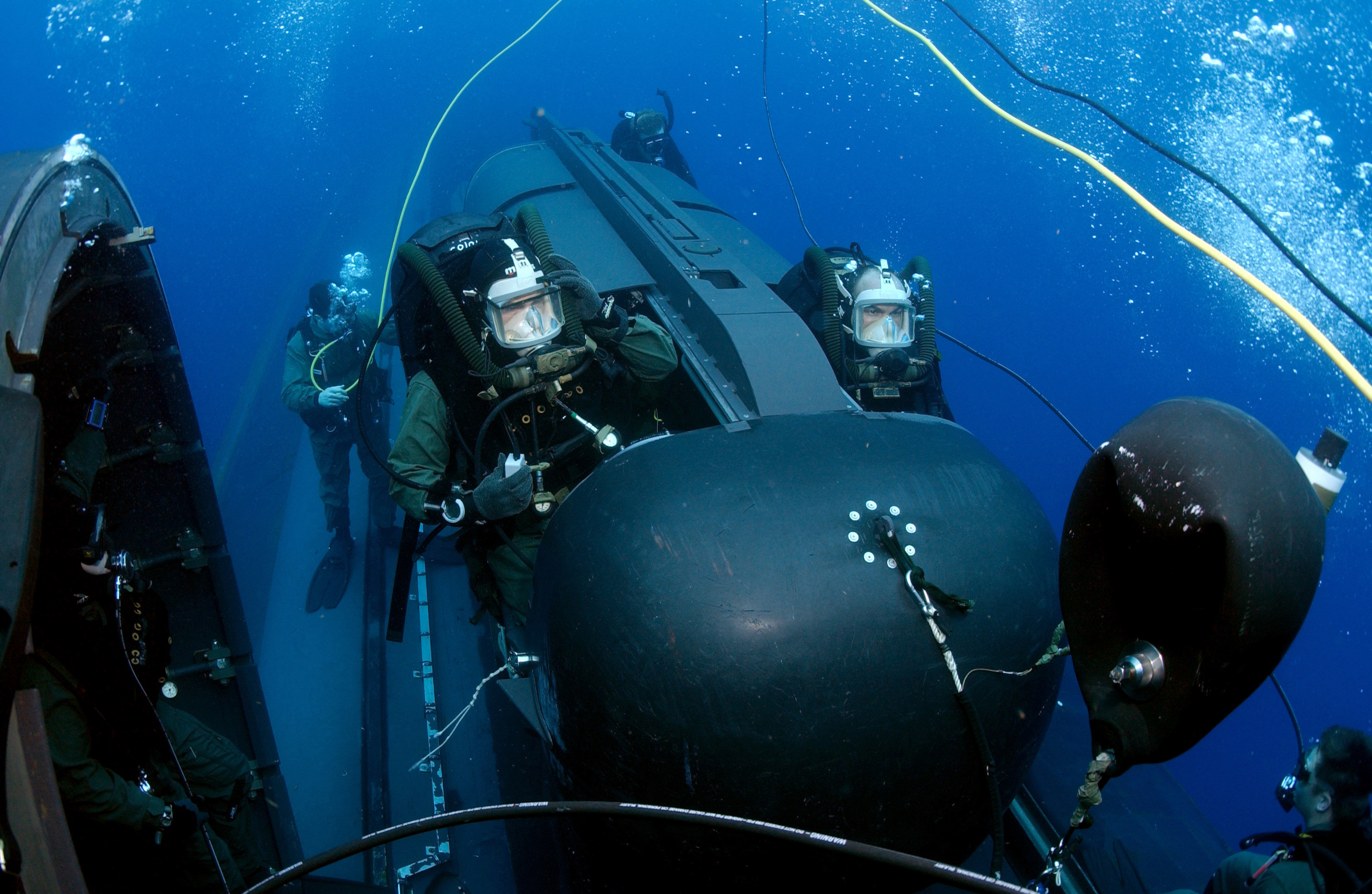
SEAL Delivery Vehicle Team Two launch a wet sub from Los Angeles-class submarine USS Philadelphia

The Motorised Submersible Canoe, developed by the British Special Operations Executive during World War II, is another example.

SEAL Team Six used two wet subs to reach the North Korean shore during the 2019 SEAL Team Six operation in North Korea.

== Hobbyists ==
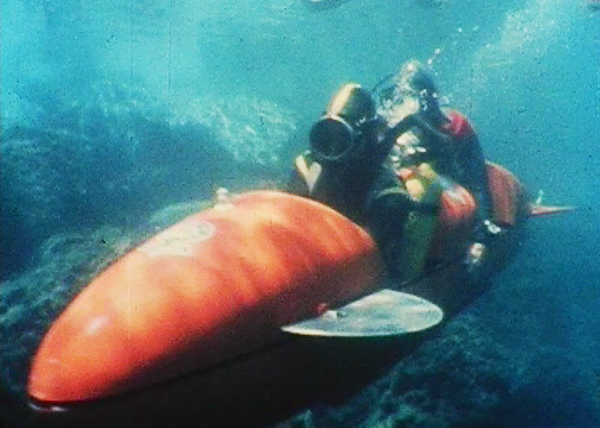
A civilian Havas submarine wet sub

A wet sub is attractive to the amateur or small commercial builder since many of the problems associated with a dry sub are avoided as only the propulsion and power systems need to be waterproof and life support is much less of an issue than it is with a sealed occupant chamber. Complete submarines of this type are also available commercially.

Wet sub designs are often used for human-powered submarines because they are smaller and lighter than dry submarines. An example is the pedal-operated wet-sub called "the Scubster", which is powered by a twin propeller connected to the pedal belt.

== Research ==
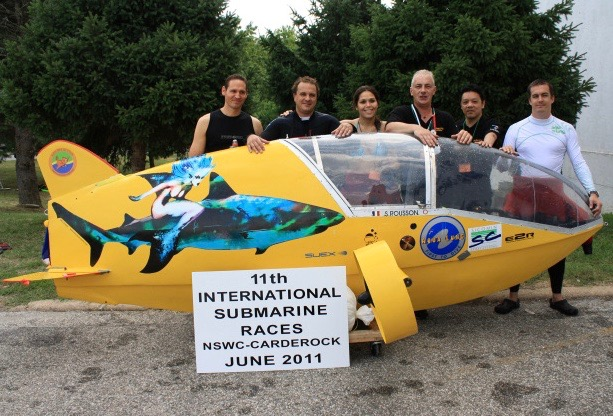
Scubster by Stéphane Rousson

Every two years, a human-powered submarine race takes place at the Naval Surface Warfare Center in Bethesda, Maryland.

== See also ==
Military wetsubs

- SEAL Delivery Vehicle
- Human torpedo

Commercial wetsubs

- Necker Nymph
- Diver propulsion vehicle
- Scubster

Custom wetsubs

- Wet Nellie
