= Hawkes Ocean Technologies =

American marine engineering firm

- Type: Private
- Industry: Marine engineering, Naval architecture, Submarine manufacturing
- Founder: Graham Hawkes
- Area served: Worldwide
- Products: Consumer submarines, ROVs, DeepFlight submersibles

Hawkes Ocean Technologies is a marine engineering firm that specializes in consumer submarines, founded by Graham Hawkes. It is headquartered in San Francisco, US.

== Hawkes Remotes ==
Hawkes Remotes is a subsidiary that builds ROVs (remotely operated vehicles), unmanned robotic submarines.

== DeepFlight ==
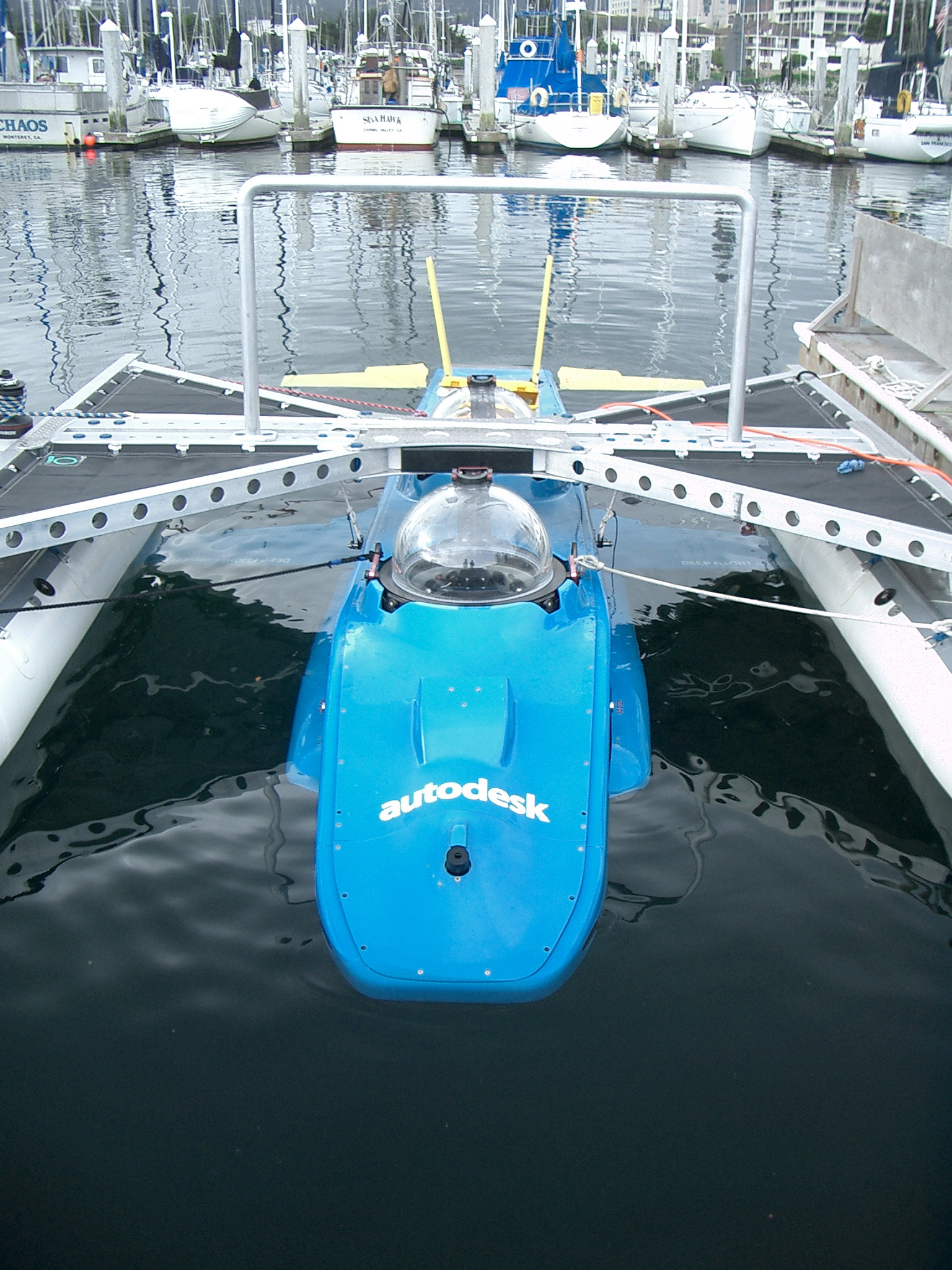
DeepFlight Aviator, 2004

Hawkes builds the DeepFlight range of submersibles, which uses hydrodynamic forces for diving, instead of ballast. The subs are all-electric. All or some of them have two pairs of wings like an airplane's, one pair front and the other pair rear, shorter than an airplane's and the other way up so they push the submarine down.

DeepFlight submersibles

- DeepFlight I

DeepFlight I was sponsored by TV firms, and serve as technology testbed for DeepFlight II.

- Wet Flight

Wet Flight was used in filming of "Dolphins: The Ride"/

- DeepFlight II

DeepFlight II was designed on AutoCAD.

- DeepFlight Aviator

With an operational depth of 1500ft, the Aviator is the first of its kind positively-buoyant submersible. It relies solely on hydrodynamic forces to dive. It was designed completely on a computer.

- DeepFlight Challenger

The Challenger was designed for Steve Fossett's attempt at the world's deepest point, Challenger Deep.

- DeepFlight Super Falcon

The SuperFalcon is much more maneuverable than all subs preceding it. Unlike most subs, it does not have a circular pressure hull. The first example was built for Tom Perkins. At the time of launch, it was the most advanced personal submarine in the world.

- DeepFlight Merlin

The initial example is called Necker Nymph and run by Virgin Limited Edition.

- DeepFlight Dragon

== Other submersibles ==
- Deep Rover, a series of 1- and 2-seater subs that relied on conventional ballast systems for diving, designed by Hawkes, built by Deep Ocean Engineering. — Some of the 2-seaters were used on the documentary film "Aliens of the Deep". This submarine design set the former world solo dive depth record in 1985 at 1000m.
  - Deep Rover I
  - Deep Rover II — Deep Rover II was used in the Michael Crichton film "Sphere".
- Mantis (submersible), a one-man deep sea engineering sub designed by Hawkes, built by OSEL. — Mantis was used in the James Bond film "For Your Eyes Only".
- Wasp (diving suit), an atmospheric diving suit for deep sea engineering designed by Hawkes, built by OSEL.
