= Graham Hawkes =

British marine engineer and designer of deep submersibles

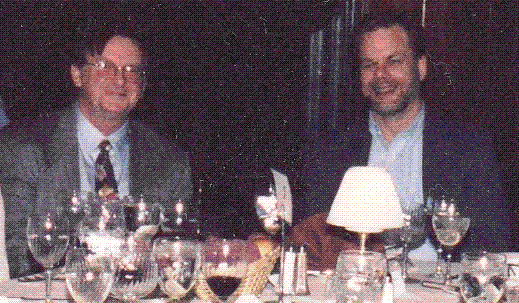
Graham Hawkes (left)

Graham Hawkes (born 23 December 1947) is a London-born marine engineer and submarine designer. Through the 1980s and 1990s, Hawkes designed 70% of the crewed submersibles produced in those two decades. As late as 2007, he held the world solo dive record of 910 metres (2,990 ft) in the submarine Deep Rover.

Hawkes invented the first robotic machine gun, the Telepresent Rapid Aiming Platform (TRAP), the first weapon he designed. He had been inspired to create a safer way for police to deal with situations after watching a shootout in North Hollywood, Los Angeles on television.

== Career ==
In 1976, in association with OSEL of Great Yarmouth, Hawkes designed the one-atmosphere deep diving suit Wasp. Two years later, he designed the one-man microsubmersible Mantis, which included remote manipulator arms. A Mantis sub was used in the James Bond film "For Your Eyes Only", which he himself piloted in a large tank at the Pinewood Studios

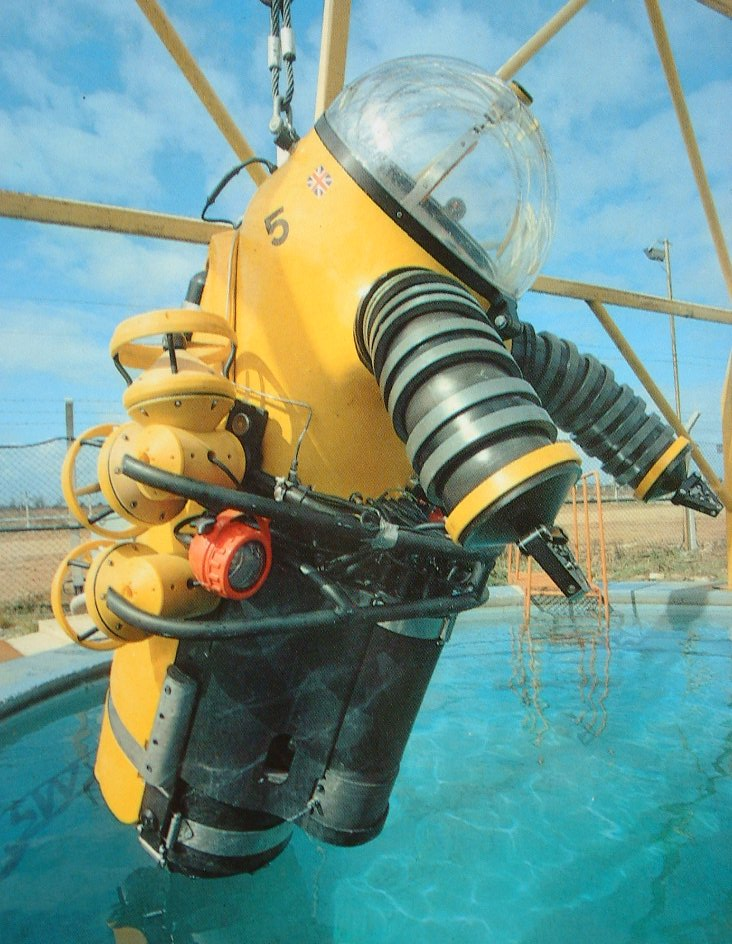
Wasp

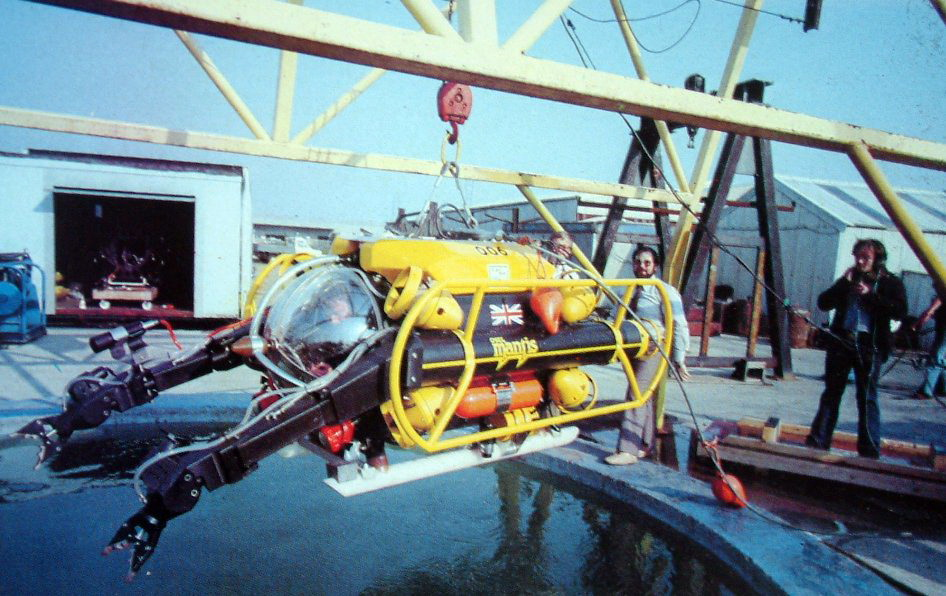
Mantis

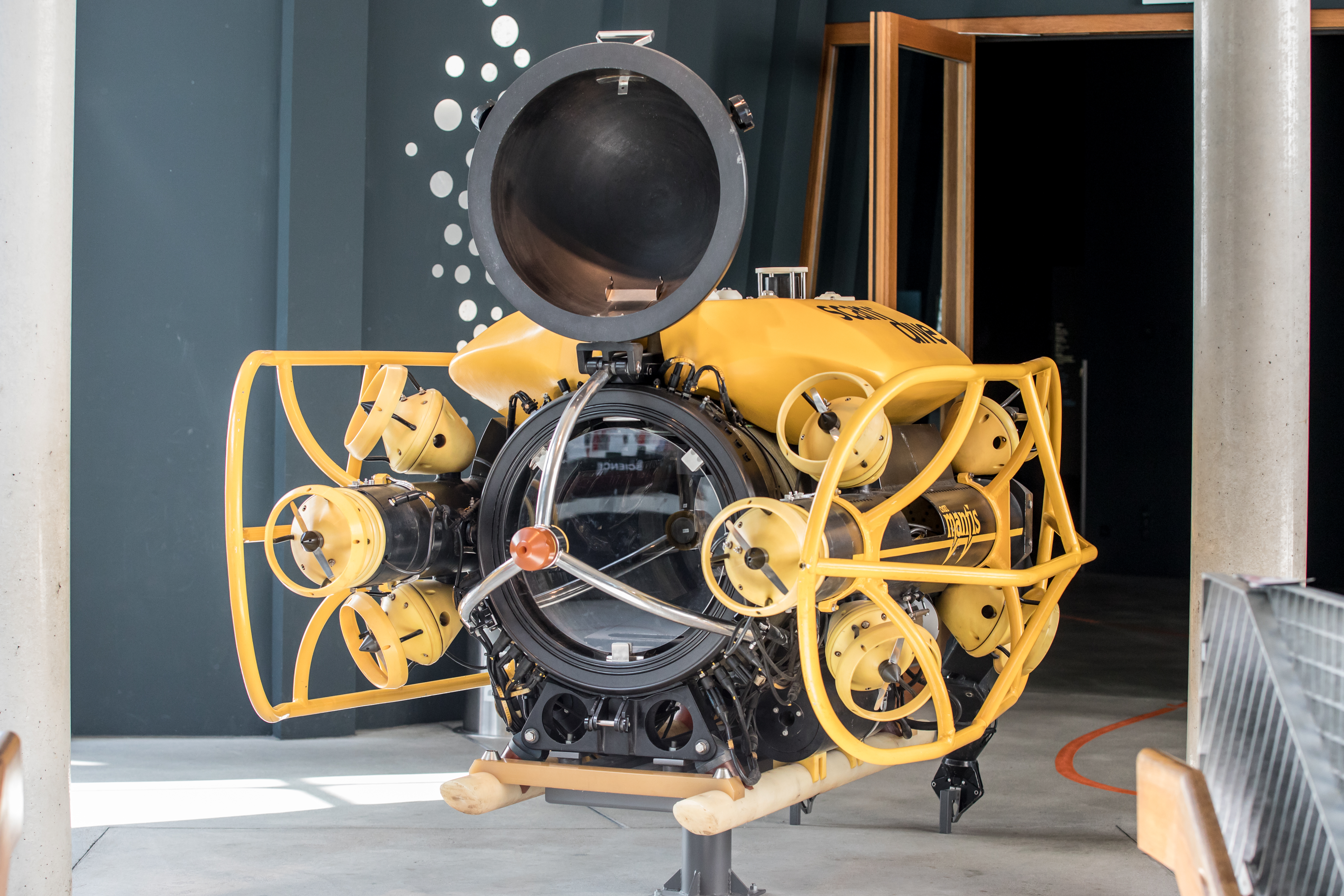
Mantis

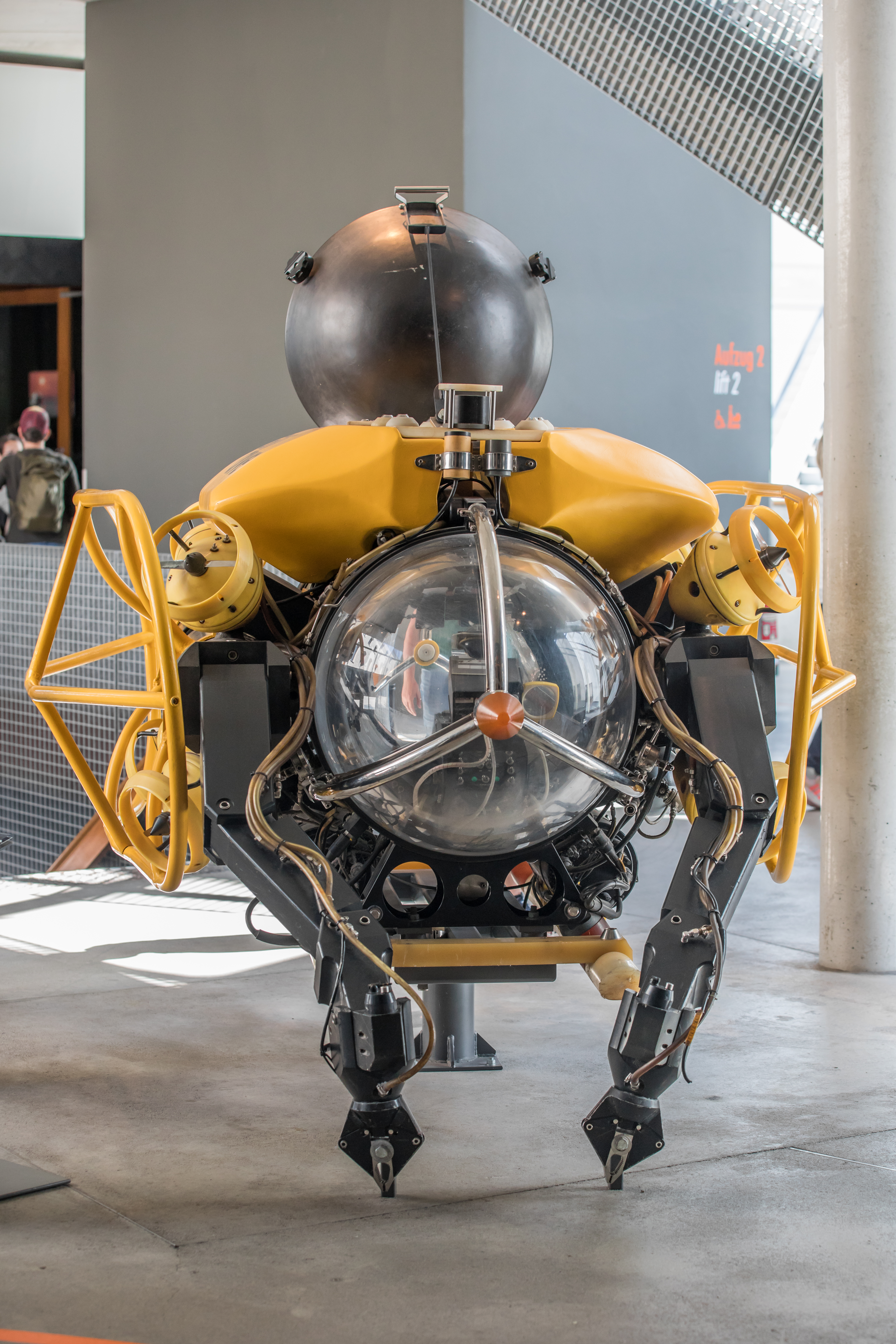
Mantis

=== Deep Ocean Engineering ===
In 1981, he designed the first of the Deep Rover-series of 1- and 2-person submersibles. In the same year, Hawkes founded Deep Ocean Technology (DOT) with Sylvia Earle, his wife from 1986 to 1992.

Hawkes also founded the San Leandro based firm, Deep Ocean Engineering (DOE), in 1982 with Earle. DOE has produced over 300 ROVs. By 1982, he had completed the Challenger submersible, capable of diving 5,000 feet (1,500 m).

In 1985, the Deep Ocean Engineering team designed and built the Deep Rover research submersible, which operates down to 1,000 metres (3,300 ft). A Deep Rover submersible was used in the 3-D IMAX film "Aliens of the Deep".

Hawkes' laconic personality was illustrated by the deep-dive sea trials of the first Deep Rover vehicle. Operating near San Clemente Island, California, from a converted mudboat, R/V Egabrag III, the sub had been launched after dark with Hawkes as pilot. The descent depth was noted every 100 metres, down to 1000 metres on the underwater telephone (UQC). Amongst the people on the bridge of Egabrag, where the UQC was installed, were the Captain and helmsman, his then wife Sylvia Earle, a reporter, cameraman and sound man from KRON-TV, a San Francisco TV station, the Operations Manager from CANDIVE and the Diving Safety Officer from the University of Rhode Island, aquanaut Phillip Sharkey. As Hawkes reported "1000 meters", there was a quiet ripple of applause on the bridge, and the reporter took the UQC microphone. He pressed the "push to talk" button and asked Hawkes, "Graham, now that you have reached your goal [of 1000 meters], and you've gone deeper, alone, than anyone ever has gone before, tell us, what does this mean for you?" The reporter was clearly expecting the flowery prose that Sylvia Earle was so justly famous for, but all he got from Hawkes was "It means ... I got my sums right."

This exploit in 1985 set the world solo dive depth record in a submersible at 1,000 m (3,300 ft), which was soon repeated by Sylvia Earle, and another team member.

After regular working hours, Hawkes and a team of engineers designed and started building Deep Flight, a positively buoyant submersible that would rely on winglets generating hydrodynamic forces for diving, targeting a dive rate of 600 ft/min (180 m/min). To save weight, the single-person Deep Flight relied on a glass fiber-reinforced pressure vessel, impregnated with syntactic foam. Its design influenced the Ocean Everest concept, which was intended to be a two-person submersible using a carbon fiber hull and meeting American Bureau of Shipping certification for operation to 30,000 psi (210 MPa; 2,000 atm).

In 1991, he made headlines when it was briefly thought that he and his team might have found the remains of 'Flight 19', missing in the Bermuda Triangle since 1945.

=== Hawkes Ocean Technologies ===
Hawkes left the day-to-day operations of Deep Ocean Engineering to found Hawkes Ocean Technologies (HOT) in 1996. HOT would later launch the Necker Nymph and DeepFlight Super Falcon which Hawkes designed.

Hawkes completed the design for the Deep Flight II two-person submarine in 1998.

In 2000, he completed the DeepFlight Aviator, the first embodiment of the Deep Flight concept, namely a positively buoyant submersible that relies on hydrodynamic forces on its wings for diving. It was also the first research submersible to attain a speed of 10 mph (16 km/h) underwater. The first example of the type is named Spirit of Patrick.

In 2008, Hawkes finished the first example of his design DeepFlight Super Falcon, which he subsequently delivered to venture capitalist Tom Perkins.

In 2010, the first example of his DeepFlight Merlin design was completed and delivered to Richard Branson. It was named the Necker Nymph and is a wet submarine that is positively buoyant and utilizes hydrodynamic forces to dive.

== Filmography ==
| Year | Title | Role | Notes |
|---|---|---|---|
| 1981 | For Your Eyes Only | Mantis Man | |
