= Virgin Limited Edition =

Hotel company in multinational Virgin Group

- Type: Private (limited liability)
- Industry: Hospitality
- Founded: 2000
- Headquarters: London, United Kingdom
- Number of locations: 9 (2025)
- Key people: Joe Margison, CEO
- Products: Hotels and Resorts
- Parent: Virgin Hotels Collection(owned by Virgin Group)
- Website: virginlimitededition.com

Virgin Limited Edition is a hotel company in the British multinational Virgin Group of companies. It has 9 properties in Europe, Africa and the Caribbean.

== Locations ==
=== Current properties ===
As of 2026, the properties held by the company are:

- Necker Island, in the British Virgin Islands
- Moskito Island, also in the British Virgin Islands
- Kasbah Tamadot, in Asni, Morocco
- Finch Hattons, a safari camp in Tsavo, in Kenya
- Mahali Mzuri, a safari camp in the Maasai Mara, also in Kenya
- Ulusaba - a luxury safari lodge & private game reserve in the Sabi Sand, near the Kruger National Park (Mpumalanga, South Africa)
- Mont Rochelle, in Franschhoek, in South Africa
- The Lodge, a mountain chalet in Verbier, in Switzerland
- Son Bunyola, in the Serra de Tramuntana of Mallorca, in the Spanish Balearic Islands.

=== Future properties ===
- Unnamed 37-Room Hotel, in Marrakesh, Morocco - 2027
