= Necker Island (British Virgin Islands) =

Privately-owned island in the British Virgin Islands

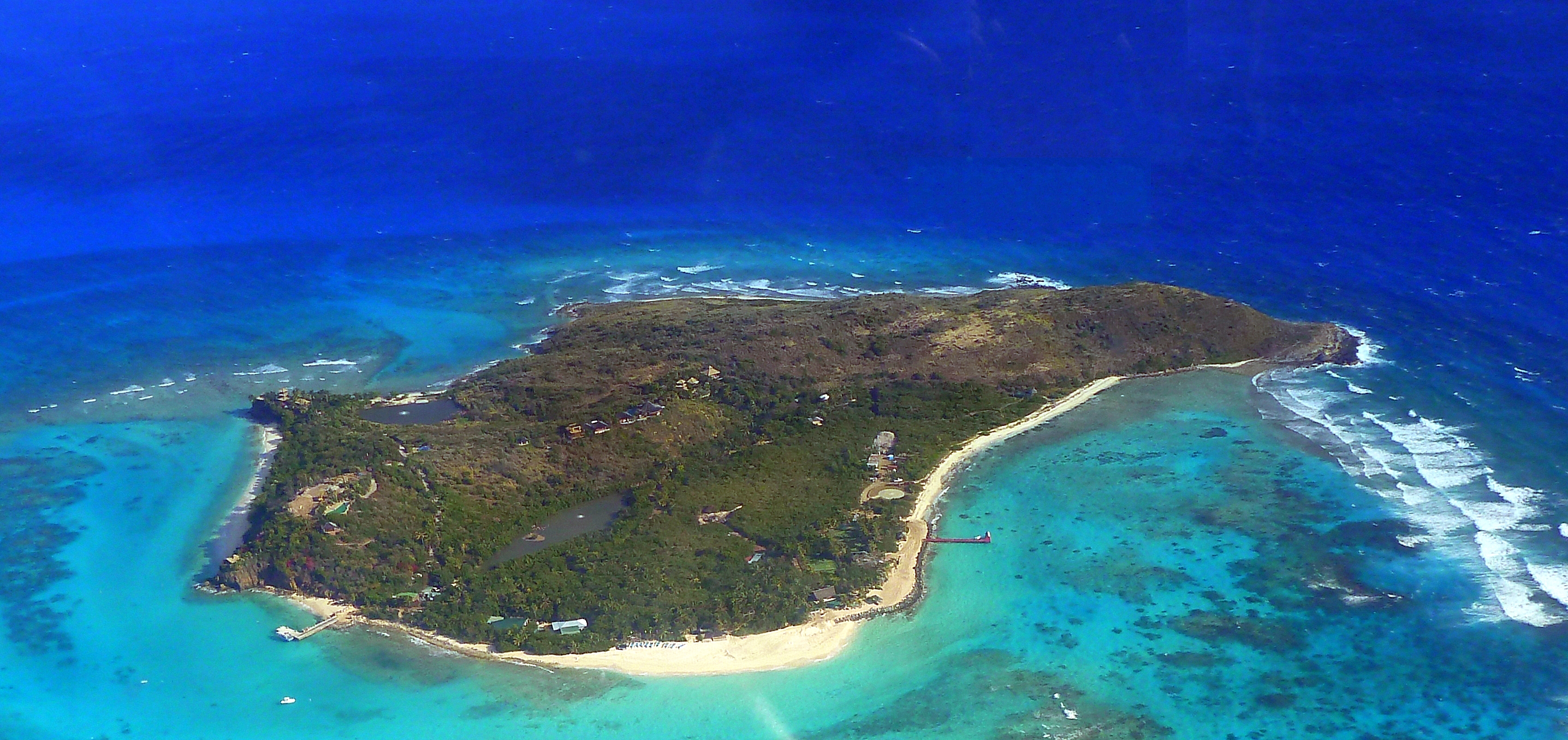

- Location of Necker Island in the British Virgin Islands

- Location within British Virgin Islands Location within the Caribbean

Geography
- Location: Caribbean Sea
- Coordinates: 18°31′38″N 64°21′29″W
- Area: 30 ha (74 acres)

Administration
- United Kingdom
- British Overseas Territory: British Virgin Islands

Additional information
- Time zone: AST (UTC-4)
- ISO code: VG
- Official website: Necker Island

Necker Island is a 30-hectare (74-acre) island in the British Virgin Islands just north of Virgin Gorda. The island is entirely owned by Sir Richard Branson, chairman of the Virgin Group, and is part of the Virgin Limited Edition portfolio of luxury properties. The whole island operates as a resort and can accommodate up to 56 guests, with additional room for 14 children.

== Location ==
Necker Island is located in the eastern section of the British Virgin Islands, about six kilometres (three nautical miles) north of Virgin Gorda and northeast of Prickly Pear Island, and also Mosquito Island (sometimes spelled Moskito Island), which is also owned by Branson. The British Virgin Islands (BVI) are a group of islands about 1,815 km (980 nmi) southeast of Miami, Florida, 184 km (99 nmi) due east of San Juan, Puerto Rico, and about 175 km (95 nmi) northwest of St. Barts.

== History ==
The island was named after the 17th-century Dutch squadron commander Jonathan de Neckere. It remained uninhabited until the late 20th century.

In 1965, the photographer Don McCullin and journalist Andrew Alexander spent 15 days on the island at the behest of The Daily Telegraph newspaper for which they worked. The magazine editor had hoped that they would survive their castaway adventure for at least three weeks, but as McCullin later recounted, "because of our gathering weakness ... out of temper, and out of water, we hoisted the red flag and were taken off in the early hours of the fifteenth day". According to McCullin, there was nothing idyllic about the desert island: "The mosquitos and other insects were more venomous and persistent than any I had encountered in Vietnam or the Congo."

== Notable events ==
On 22 August 2011, The Great House burned down in a blaze believed to be caused by lightning from Tropical Storm Irene. At the time the house was occupied by as many as twenty guests, with Branson himself staying in a residence nearby. All of the guests escaped unhurt from the burning house, which was totally destroyed. Among the twenty occupants were actress Kate Winslet, Branson's 87-year-old mother Eve and his 29-year-old daughter Holly. The Great House was subsequently rebuilt with an expanded Great Room.

The Necker Cup, an exhibition tennis tournament held at the end of the tennis season, has been held on the island annually since 2012.

Richard Branson's Extreme Tech Challenge has been hosted annually at Necker Island since 2015. Described as one of the largest technology competitions in the world, the challenge begins at the annual Consumer Electronics Show in Las Vegas with the top 10 new innovations progressing to the finals at Necker Island where Branson joins the judging panel along with technology figures and investors from Silicon Valley.

In February 2017, former U.S. President Barack Obama and his wife Michelle visited Necker as guests of Branson.

On 6 September 2017, Hurricane Irma, a category 5 hurricane, made landfall on Necker Island destroying most of the island. Branson was quoted as saying "I have never seen anything like this hurricane. Necker and the whole area have been completely and utterly devastated". By April 2018, most of the damaged structures had been rebuilt.

== Land ownership by Richard Branson ==
Richard Branson was made aware that some of the islands in the British Virgin Islands were for sale in 1978. Branson soon after went to the British Virgin Islands for a holiday to investigate the prospective real estate. On first observing the islands, he envisioned using them to put up rock stars for his record label. Upon arrival, they were given a luxury villa and travelled around islands for sale by helicopter. The final island he saw was Necker Island, and after climbing the hill and being stunned by the view and wildlife, decided to purchase the island. After making a lowball bid of $100,000 for the island (due to his relatively modest funds at that time in his career), he was turned down and escorted back to the mainland. A year later, the owner, John Lyttelton, 11th Viscount Cobham, in need of short-term capital, eventually settled for $180,000. (Note: Branson himself had previously stated that he purchased the island for $120,000, although a post on Virgin's website stating this lower purchase price now appears to have been deleted.) However, the government imposed a restriction on alien landholders: that the new owner had to develop a resort within four years or the island would revert to the state. Branson committed to building a resort on the island.

When Branson bought the island, it was uninhabited. He purchased the island at the age of 28, just six years after starting Virgin Group. It took three years and some $10 million to turn it into a private island retreat. Using local stone, Brazilian hardwoods, Asian antiques, Indian rugs, art pieces and fabrics and bamboo furniture from Bali, architects and designers created a ten-bedroom Balinese-style villa at the top of a hill above the beach. Each of the ten bedrooms has open walls, giving a 360-degree view. The island has accommodation for 40 people and rents out in total at US$102,500 per day. The cost of staying includes access to two beaches, private pools, tennis courts, scenic views, a personal chef, a team of about 100 staff and a wide array of water sports equipment. A number of non-native, exotic animal species, such as lemurs and kangaroos, have been introduced to the island as part of Branson’s private wildlife collection.

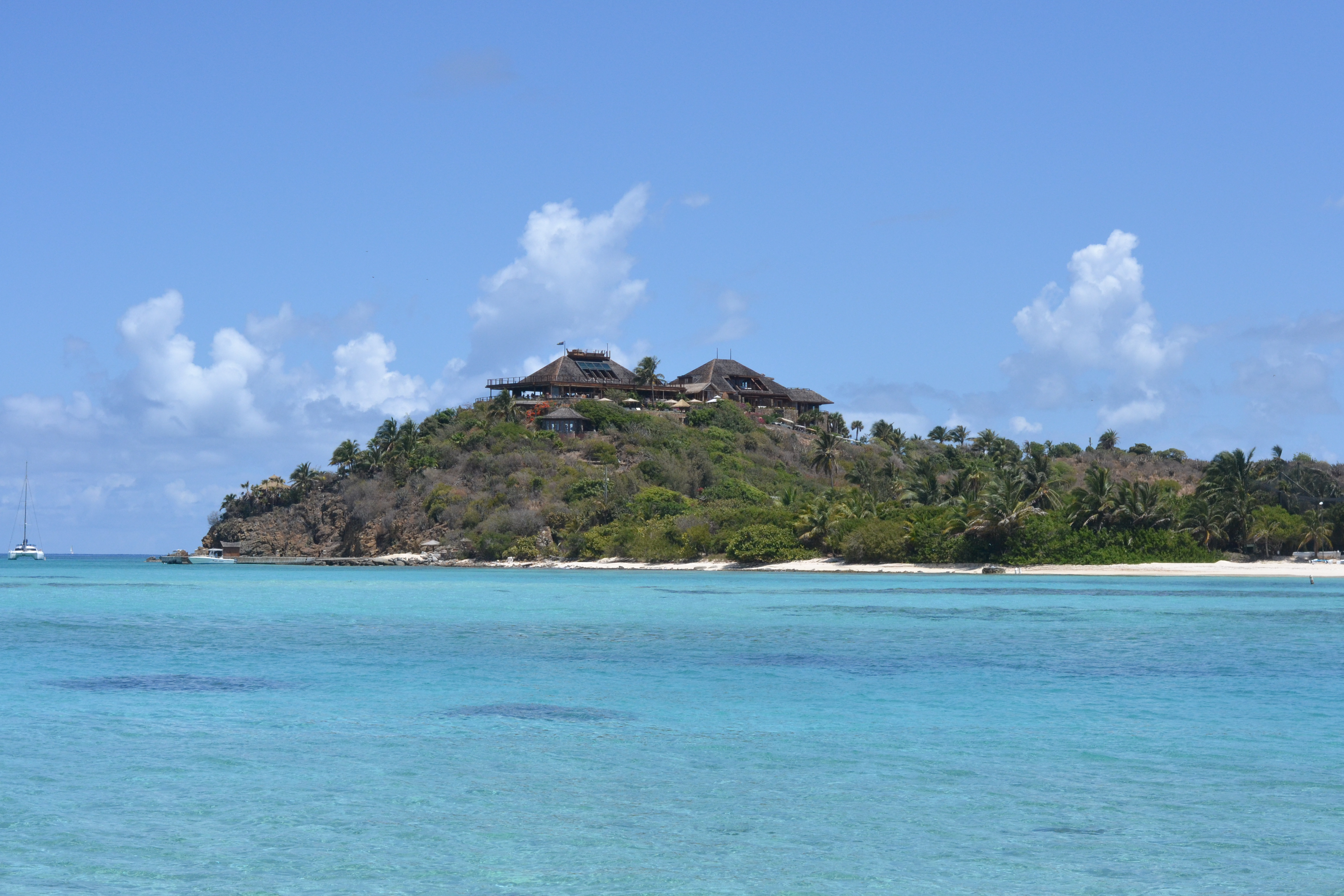
The Great House on Necker Island, built after Hurricane Irene in August 2011.

== Privacy and access ==
Although the land on the island is entirely privately owned, under British Virgin Islands law, all beaches up to the high-water mark are Crown land, and are open to the public.
