= Sabrina Dawood =

Pakistani philanthropist and educational activist

- سبرینہ داؤد
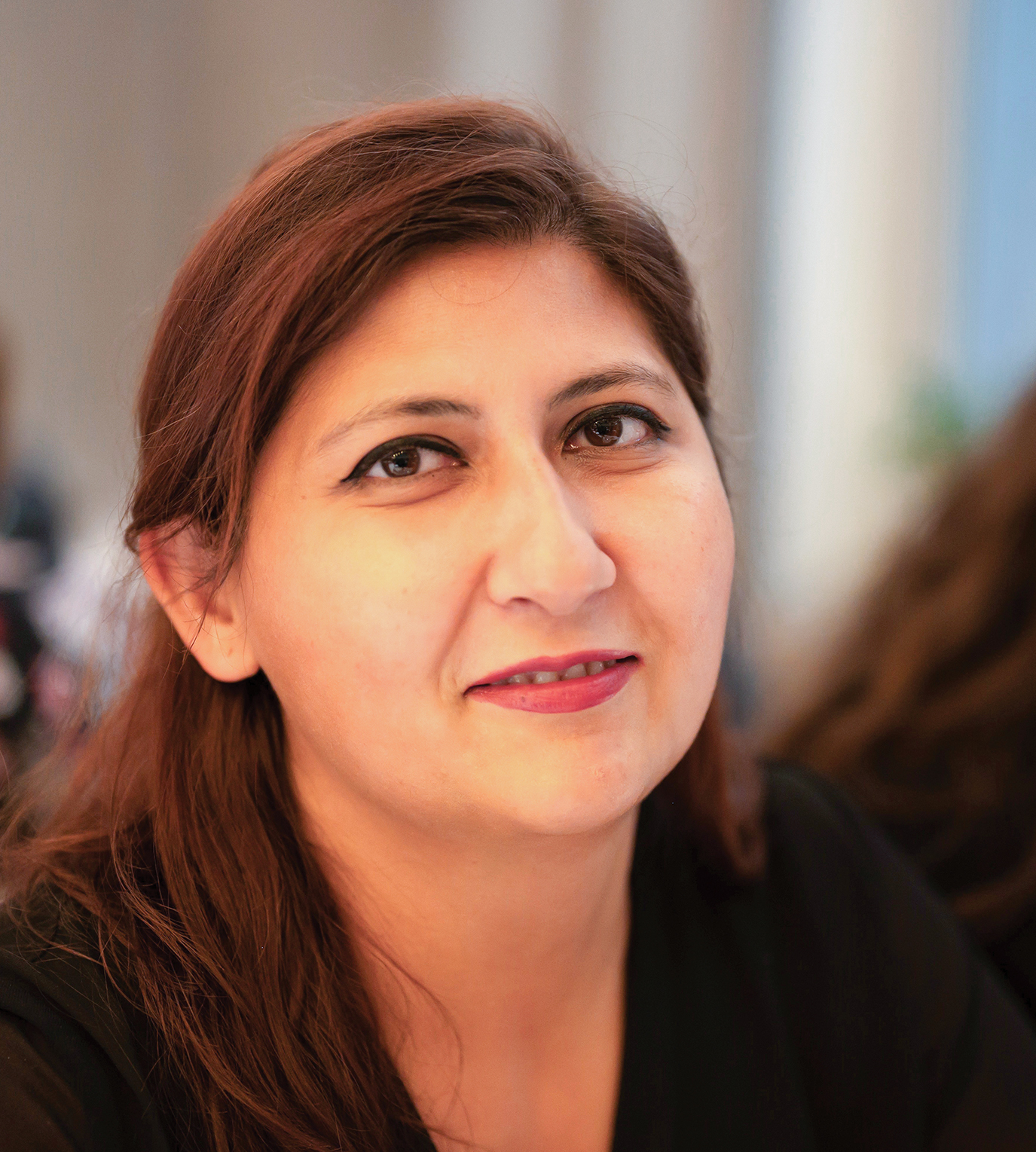
- Born: Lahore, Pakistan
- Education: London School of Economics; University College London
- Occupations: Vice-Chair, The Dawood Foundation
- Known for: MagnifiScience Centre
- Parent(s): Hussain Dawood; Kulsum Dawood
- Relatives: Shahzada Dawood, Abdul Samad Dawood (brothers)

Sabrina Dawood is a Pakistani philanthropist and educational activist. She serves as vice-chair of the Board of Trustees of The Dawood Foundation (TDF), a registered charitable organisation established in 1960 by the Dawood family to support community development through education. Her work has focused on building interactive and inclusive learning spaces, integrating environmental topics into formal education, and supporting science literacy in Pakistan.

== Early life and education ==
Dawood was born and raised in Lahore, Pakistan. She holds a Bachelor of Arts degree in Anthropology and Law from the London School of Economics and a Master of Science degree in Medical Anthropology from University College London. She has three siblings: Azmeh, Samad, and Shahzada.

== Career ==
=== The Dawood Foundation ===
Dawood serves as Vice-Chair of the Board of Trustees of The Dawood Foundation, a philanthropic organisation and registered as a not-for-profit organisation. The Foundation was established in 1960 as the principal philanthropic vehicle of the Dawood Group. Under her leadership, the Foundation has developed several educational and cultural programmes in Karachi.

She has overseen Dawood Public School (DPS), founded in 1983, which provides primary and secondary education to girls in Karachi and serves more than 2,500 students.

=== MagnifiScience ===
Dawood initiated the MagnifiScience programme under TDF, beginning with science exhibitions held in 2016 and 2017 at DPS. A MagnifiScience Children's Studio opened in Karachi in October 2018.

The MagnifiScience Centre opened in September 2021 in the Railway Quarters of Saddar, Karachi, as the first interactive science centre of its kind in Pakistan. Since its opening, the centre has attracted hundreds of thousands of visitors. Ninety-five percent of the centre's more than 400 exhibits are designed and built in-house using local materials, engineers, educators and craftspeople.

=== TDF Ghar ===
Dawood led the development of TDF Ghar, a heritage-based learning space and museum that opened in 2017. The building is a restored 1930s home formerly belonging to Hajiani Hanifa Bai, the mother of Dawood Group founder Ahmed Dawood, situated on Muhammad Ali Jinnah Road, Karachi. The project was conceived as a space for youth engagement that preserves the cultural heritage of Karachi.

=== Board positions and other roles ===
Dawood serves as a director on the boards of Engro Corporation, Dawood Hercules Corporation Limited, Dawood Lawrencepur Limited, Cyan Limited, the Hajiani Hanifabai Memorial Society, and the Karachi Education Initiative. She is a Trustee of Engro Foundation, the philanthropic vehicle of Engro Corporation. She is a member of the Board of Governors of the National Management Foundation of Lahore University of Management Sciences and a member of the board of WWF Pakistan. She also serves as an adviser to Kainaat Studios.

Dawood chairs the Hussain Dawood Pledge, a philanthropic initiative comprising corporate contributions for COVID-19 relief and mitigation across multiple organisations. She has advocated for the integration of environmental topics and climate change into formal education in Pakistan.
