= Shahzada Dawood =

Pakistani businessman and philanthropist (1975–2023)

- شہزادہ داؤد
- Born: 12 February 1975; Rawalpindi, Pakistan
- Died: 18 June 2023 (aged 48); North Atlantic Ocean
- Cause of death: Implosion of Titan submersible
- Citizenship: Pakistan; United Kingdom; Malta
- Education: Aitchison College; Buckingham University (LLB); Philadelphia University (MSc)
- Occupations: Vice-chairman of Engro; Director of Dawood Hercules
- Spouse: Christine Dawood (m. 2002)
- Children: 2
- Father: Hussain Dawood
- Relatives: Ahmed Dawood (paternal grandfather); Sabrina Dawood (sister)

Shahzada Dawood (Urdu: شہزادہ داؤد; 12 February 1975 – 18 June 2023) was a Pakistani (Note: Dawood also held British and Maltese citizenship.) businessman.

Dawood, his 19-year-old son, Suleman, and three other people on board the submersible Titan were killed when it imploded during a tourist expedition to view the wreck of the Titanic.

== Early life ==
Shahzada Dawood was born on 12 February 1975 in Rawalpindi, the eldest son of Hussain Dawood. His sisters were Azmeh Dawood and Sabrina Dawood, the latter known for her philanthropic endeavours. His brother was Abdul Samad Dawood.

Their paternal grandfather, Ahmed Dawood, was a prominent Memon industrialist who established the family business, Dawood Group. Dawood received his early education from Aitchison College, Lahore. He pursued further studies, attaining an LLB from Buckingham University and an MSc in global textile marketing from Philadelphia University (now Thomas Jefferson University).

== Career ==
Dawood was the vice-chairman of the Engro Corporation, and a director of the Dawood Hercules Corporation.

Dawood had been on the board of the Engro Corporation since 2003. He became the vice-chairman of Engro in October 2021. Before this, he had been the vice-chairman of the Dawood Hercules Corporation. He had invested in finding growth opportunities through mergers and acquisitions in textiles, fertilizers, foods, and energy in public-listed companies.

In 2012, Dawood was named a Young Global Leader by the World Economic Forum. Dawood had spoken at the United Nations in 2020 on the occasion of International Day of Women and Girls in Science.

== Philanthropy ==
From 1996 to 2023, Dawood had been a trustee of the family-foundation, The Dawood Foundation (TDF), which focused on education. TDF had been coordinating the Hussain Dawood Pledge, a private donation to fight COVID-19 in Pakistan. He had been focused in efforts to provide mental health support to people hit by the pandemic in Pakistan.

Dawood was also a trustee of Engro Foundation, a member of the Global Advisory Board for Prince's Trust International, a charity founded by Charles III, and a board member of the SETI Institute.

== Personal life ==
In 2002, Dawood married German-born Christine (born 1975). After having lived in Pakistan and Singapore, they settled in the United Kingdom in 2014. They had two children together: a son, Suleman (2004–2023), and a daughter, Alina (born 2006).

Dawood became a Maltese citizen in 2016, reportedly through an Individual Investor Programme.

Media reports indicate that Dawood had a keen interest in investigating natural habitats and renewable energies. He was described as a "photography enthusiast", particularly passionate about wildlife photography and exploring different natural habitats.

=== Titan expedition and death ===
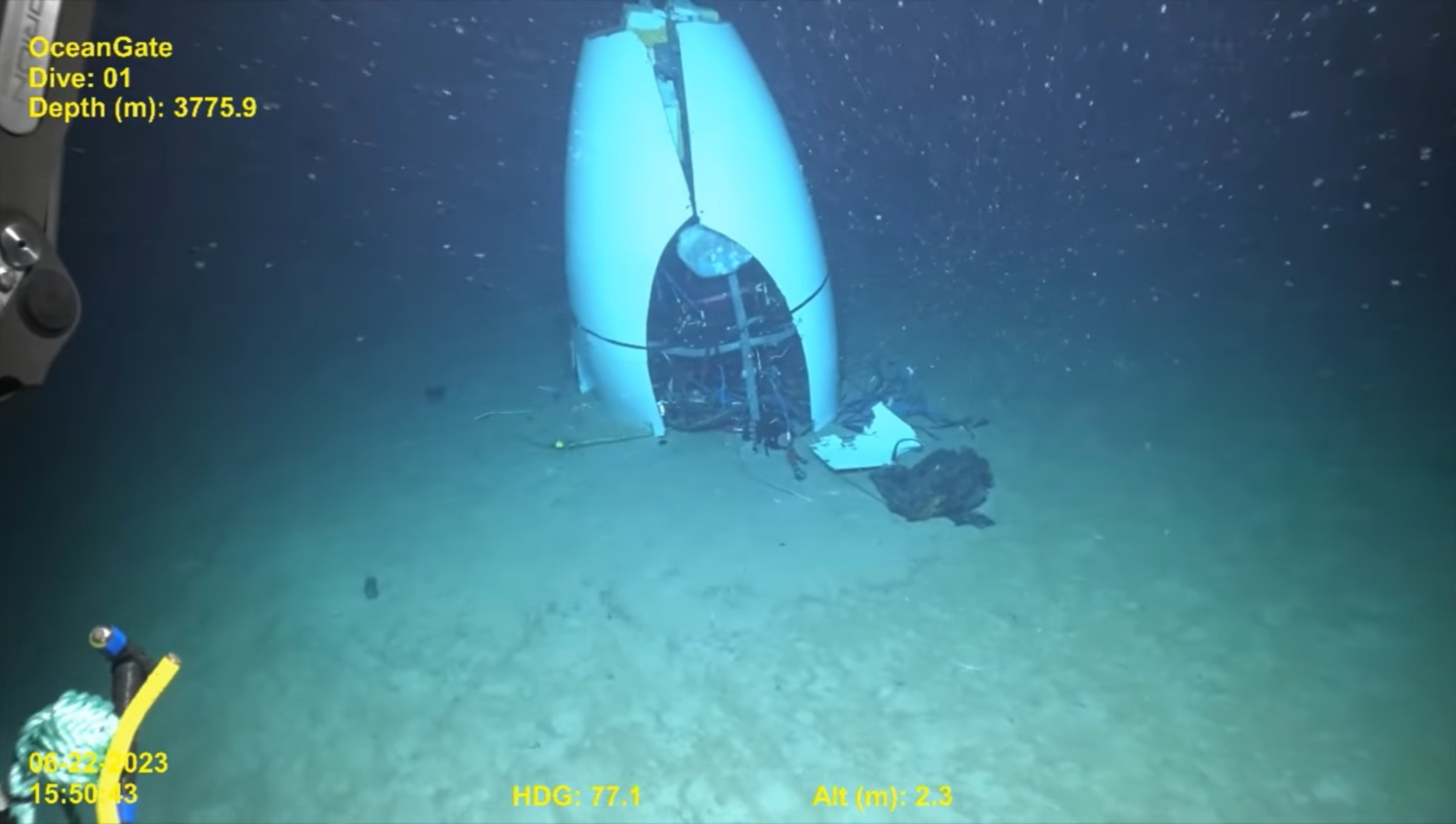
Wreckage of Titan on the ocean floor, 22 June 2023

Dawood and his family departed from their residence in London and journeyed to Canada for the duration of one month. Dawood, a Titanic enthusiast with a "years long passion for science and discovery," booked tickets for himself and his wife over Father's Day weekend to embark on the Titan submersible to view the wreck of the Titanic. His wife later gave her ticket to the couple's nineteen-year-old son, Suleman, who was also a Rubik's Cube player. The dive, which was expected to bring the travellers to a depth of 3,800 metres (12,500 ft), began on the morning of 18 June 2023 and was expected to last eight hours. Approximately 1 hour and 45 minutes after beginning the descent, Titan lost contact with the surface ship, the MV Polar Prince. Search and rescue missions involved water and air support from the United States, Canada and France.

On 22 June 2023, the United States Coast Guard confirmed that they had found debris approximately 1,600 feet (500 metres) from the bow of the Titanic that was "consistent with a catastrophic loss of the pressure chamber", and concluded that the passengers aboard Titan – Dawood and his son, Suleman, as well as Hamish Harding, Paul-Henri Nargeolet, and OceanGate CEO Stockton Rush — had all died instantly.

The remains of Dawood and Suleman were recovered from the seabed by the United States Coast Guard and identified through DNA profiling. In an interview with The Guardian published on 25 April 2026, Christine, Shahzada's widow and Suleman's mother, said the identified remains were returned to her in two small boxes approximately nine months after the implosion. She added that investigators had also recovered a quantity of commingled remains that could not be separated by DNA analysis between the five victims, and that she had declined the offer to receive a share of this material.

== See also ==
- List of solved missing person cases (2020s)
