= The Dawood Foundation =

Pakistani nonprofit foundation founded by Ahmed Dawood

- بنیاد داؤد
- Abbreviation: TDF
- Formation: 1960
- Founder: Ahmed Dawood
- Type: Non-Profit Organisation
- Legal status: Registered Society
- Purpose: Education, Health
- Headquarters: Karachi, Sindh, Pakistan
- Region served: Pakistan
- Method: Endowment
- Key people: Hussain Dawood (Chairman); Sabrina Dawood (Vice-Chairperson); Favad Soomro (CEO)
- Employees: 73 (2021)
- Website: dawoodfoundation.org

The Dawood Foundation (TDF) is a nonprofit family foundation based in Karachi, Pakistan. Established in 1960, TDF has been active in Pakistan for several decades, with a focus on education and social development. It has supported the establishment and operation of a range of formal and informal educational institutions across the country. Two of its initiatives, the MagnifiScience Centre and TDF Ghar, have been officially recognised as museums by the Government of Sindh.

TDF is a civil society organisation certified by the Pakistan Centre for Philanthropy (PCP) for its work in promoting social development.

== History ==
Established in 1950, the Dawood Trust was created to provide scholarships and financial assistance to students and educational institutions. (Note: Between 1953 and 1960, the Dawood Trust disbursed more than 1.4 million Pakistani rupee in support of educational development across Pakistan. This figure reflects the nominal value at the time and would correspond to a substantially higher amount in terms of today's purchasing power.) In response to growing national demand for more structured philanthropic engagement, the Trust was reconstituted and formally registered as The Dawood Foundation in Karachi on 2 February 1960, under the leadership of Ahmed Dawood. It was envisioned to serve as an educational foundation whose main focus was to support and promote educational initiatives in the fields of science, technology, and research.

== Board of trustees and leadership ==
The Foundation is governed by a board of trustees, namely Hussain Dawood (chair), Sabrina Dawood (Vice-chairperson), Kulsum Dawood, Abdul Samad Dawood, Christine Dawood, Shafiq Ahmed, Mohammad Shamoon Chaudry, Ahsan Zafar Syed. TDF operates on a daily basis under the leadership of Favad Soomro. Shahzada Dawood served as a trustee on the board until his death during a dive to the wreck of the RMS Titanic on 18 June 2023.

== Education focus ==
TDF's focus and contributions have predominantly been in the area of formal education. These informal learning projects have been designed to cater to people from all segments of the society, including those with learning or physical disabilities.

=== Formal education projects ===
Dawood College of Engineering & Technology (DCET)
TDF established Dawood College of Engineering & Technology (DCET) in Karachi in 1964 to cater to Pakistan's growing demand for engineers and technology experts. This was the first major educational project undertaken by the Foundation. DCET was nationalised in 1971. In light of its commendable educational standards and accomplished alumni, DCET was granted the status of a university in 2013 and was renamed as the Dawood University of Engineering & Technology (DUET).

Karachi School of Business and Leadership (KSBL)
The Karachi School of Business and Leadership (KSBL) is an independent graduate business school located in Karachi, Pakistan. The school was established in 2009 through a strategic collaboration between Karachi Education Initiative (KEI) and the Cambridge Judge Business School.

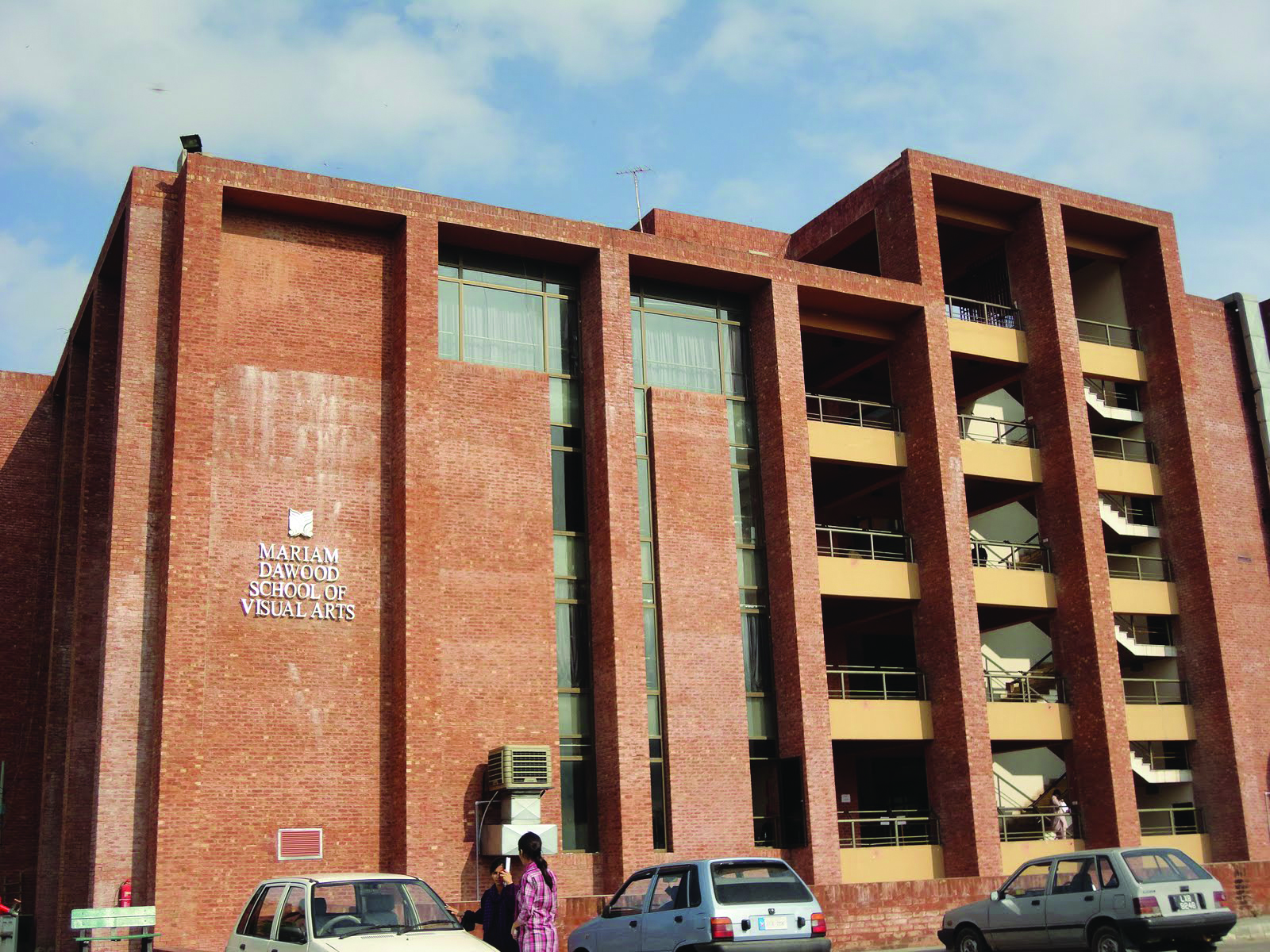
Mariam Dawood School of Visual Arts at BNU, Lahore

Mariam Dawood School of Visual Arts and Design
In 2004, TDF donated funds for the establishment of the Mariam Dawood School of Visual Arts and Design (MDSVAD), at Beaconhouse National University (BNU) in Lahore. The school offers undergraduate and graduate degree programs in a variety of visual arts and design disciplines, including painting, sculpture, graphic design, textile design, and architecture. The school has a distinguished faculty of artists and designers, many of whom have international reputations in their fields.

F. G. Dawood Public School
Federal Government Dawood Public School in Muzaffarabad was one of the schools which was destroyed during the 2005 Kashmir earthquake and was reconstructed by TDF. Inaugurated in 2008, the school was renamed as ‘F.G. Dawood Public School’. It caters to approximately 800 to 1000 students up to Matric level.

==== Dawood Public School (DPS) ====
Founded in 1983 by Mr. Ahmed Dawood, Dawood Public School (DPS) is a trust owned educational institution located in Bahadurabad area of Karachi. Dawood Public School is affiliated with Cambridge University which accommodates young girls from 2 years to 19 years, ranging from Pre-Primary education to A-Levels.

Ahmed Dawood Government High School, Darsano
Ahmed Dawood School was one of the earlier initiatives of the Dawood Trust, later changed to The Dawood Foundation, built in 1959 in Darsano Village which is now a part of Malir in Karachi. The school was handed over to the Government and is still operating today. It has around 400 students in the primary and secondary sections.

Government Boys B.T.M. High School
To serve the community in the vicinity of the Burewala Textile Mills, one of the former companies of the Dawood family-owned businesses in Southern Punjab, the predecessor organisation of TDF established the Government Boys B.T.M. High School in 1955. The school was nationalised in 1972 and it is still functioning under government administration. The ownership of the school and its playgrounds remain with TDF. The school is currently providing education to over 750 students.

Dawood Science Block in Government Degree College Burewala
The Government Intermediate College in Burewala was established in 1961 for teaching solely Arts subjects. For the benefit of Burewala students wishing to pursue studies in Science, TDF undertook the construction of Dawood Science Block in which science education is being imparted up to the degree level. The Foundation had also awarded scholarships to talented students at the college.

Ahmed Dawood Chair, Lahore University of Management Sciences (LUMS)
The Ahmed Dawood Chair was established in 2003 by TDF for the SBA School of Science and Engineering Dean to maintain high standards of faculty and educational leadership at the Lahore University of Management Sciences (LUMS).

=== Informal education projects ===
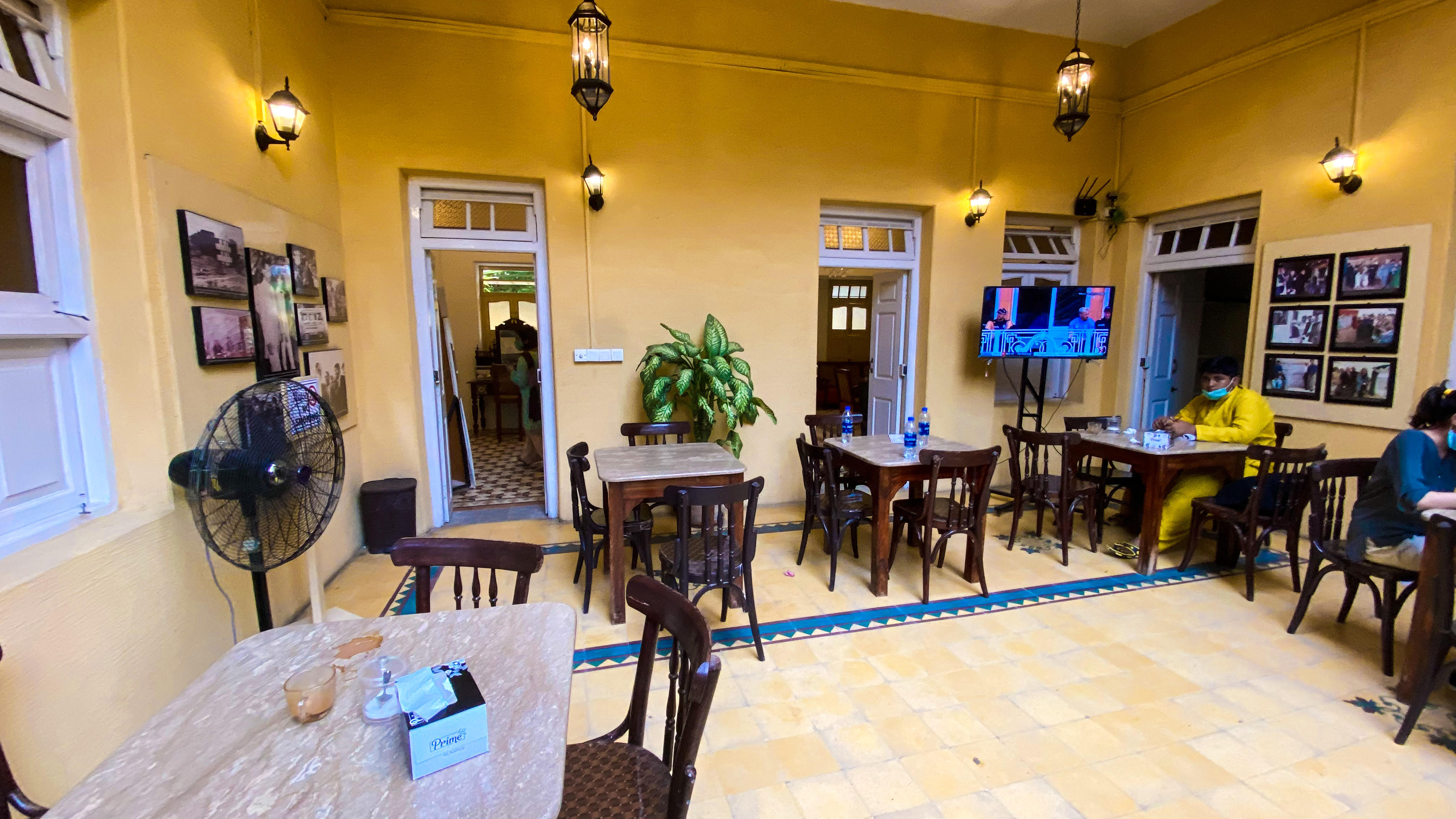
TDF Ghar, a 1930s town house in Karachi, is open to public as an informal learning space which has been converted into a museum.

TDF's informal learning initiatives include popularising science through its umbrella of TDF MagnifiScience, raising awareness about the environment through TDF Nature Series, and promoting informal learning spaces as well as heritage conservation through TDF Ghar.

TDF Ghar
The Foundation's informal learning initiatives include TDF Ghar (Urdu for home). This is an old building from the 1930s which was restored in 2017 as a ‘living museum’ of the past and an informal learning space. TDF Ghar showcases the myriad influences of cultures and ethnicities that belong or have previously belonged to Karachi. Each piece of furniture depicts the confluence of Muslim, Hindu, Christian, Parsi, and Jewish traditions in a home. TDF Ghar preserves and presents these heritage features to remind people of Karachi as a place of heterogeneity and harmony. At TDF Ghar, exhibitions are also curated about the history of Karachi and different events are hosted that promote art, music, and culture.

TDF MagnifiScience
Since 2016, TDF has been working to promote scientific literacy and thinking as well as increasing STEM (Science, technology, engineering, and mathematics) skills. The Foundation has organised Pakistan's largest science exhibitions, established the first children's science studio in the country, TDF MagnifiScience Children's Studio. The studio was closed in September 2021 due to the establishment of a much bigger space, the country's first contemporary and interactive Science Centre, the MagnifiScience Centre in Karachi.

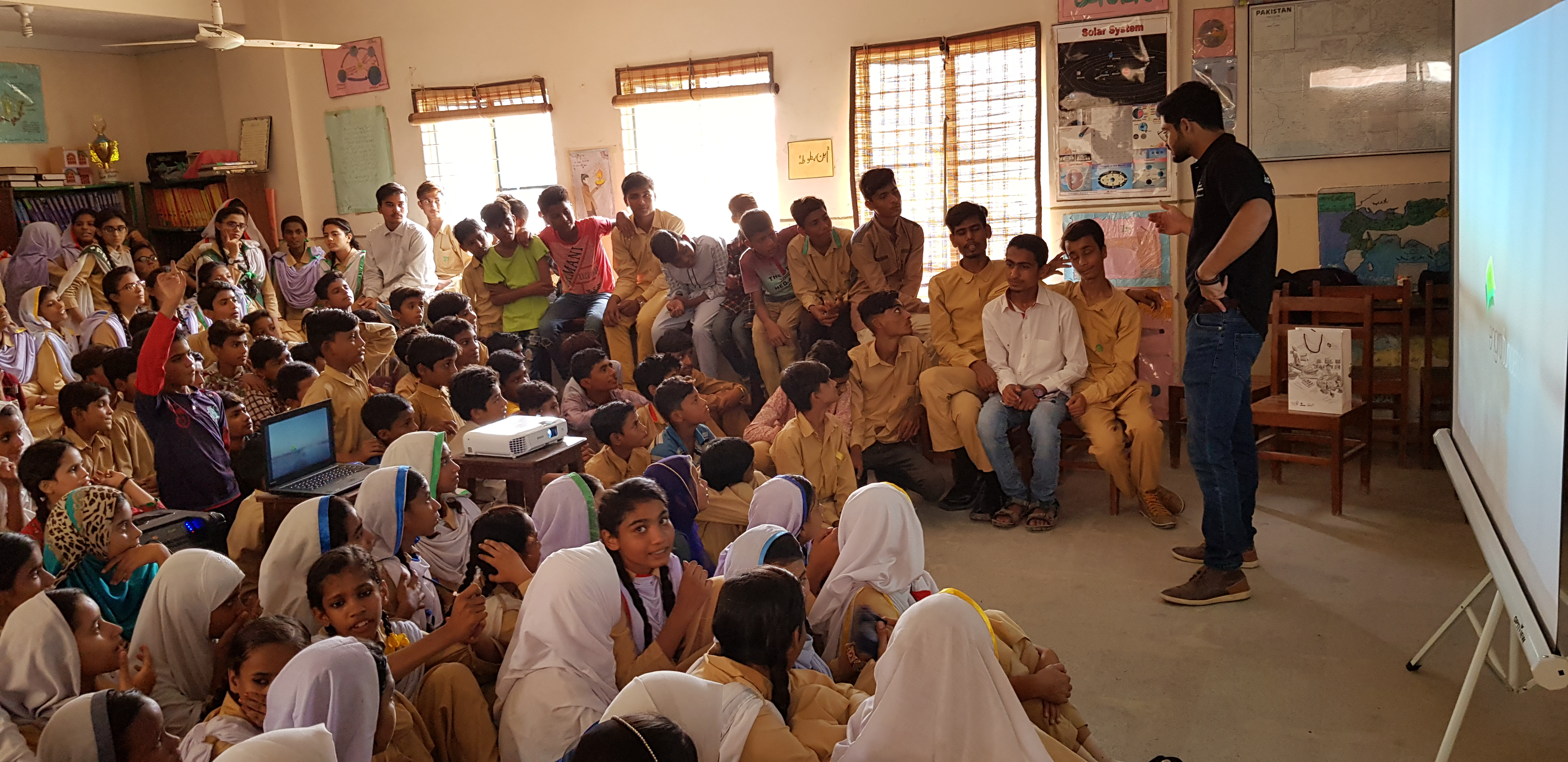
TDF's Nature Series presented in a class room.

TDF Nature Series
The Foundation launched the TDF Nature Series in 2015 with the aim to raise public awareness about Pakistan's degrading natural habitat. The series is a collection of documentaries which capture the broad variety of the natural habitats of Pakistan. These documentaries include Margalla Hills—Urban Wilderness, Cliff-walkers of Chitral Gol, Mangroves — Custodians of the Coast, Frozen Giants of the Karakoram, and Desert Dwellers of Tharparkar. These documentaries are free for public viewing and are screened at schools, public spaces, and film festivals across the country.

== Health and disaster relief ==
As a philanthropic organisation, TDF has also been involved in relief work during natural disasters such as the cyclones in East Pakistan in the 1960s, the Kashmir and Balochistan earthquakes in 2005 and 2008 respectively, the floods of Sindh and Punjab in 2010, and the Thar drought of 2012. It has also provided financial support to various hospitals and medical projects including the construction of the Al Shifa Eye Trust Hospital and buildings in Aga Khan University Hospital.

It is primarily the Dawood Foundation along with the Engro Foundation which disburses the funds of the Hussain Dawood Pledge, one of the biggest private donations and initiatives to fight against the COVID-19 pandemic in Pakistan.
