= MagnifiScience Centre =

Science Centre in Karachi

- میگنفی سائنس سینٹر
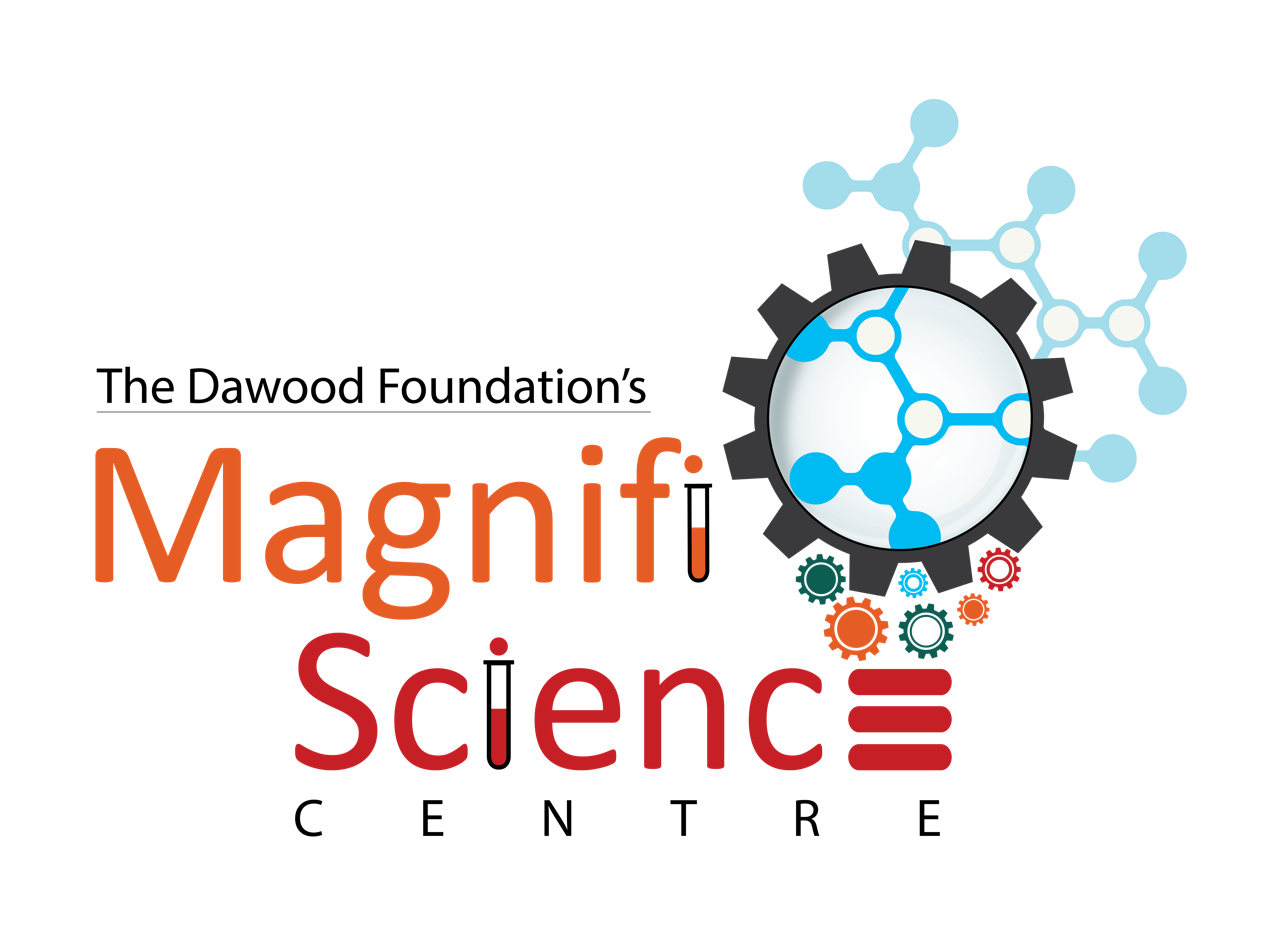

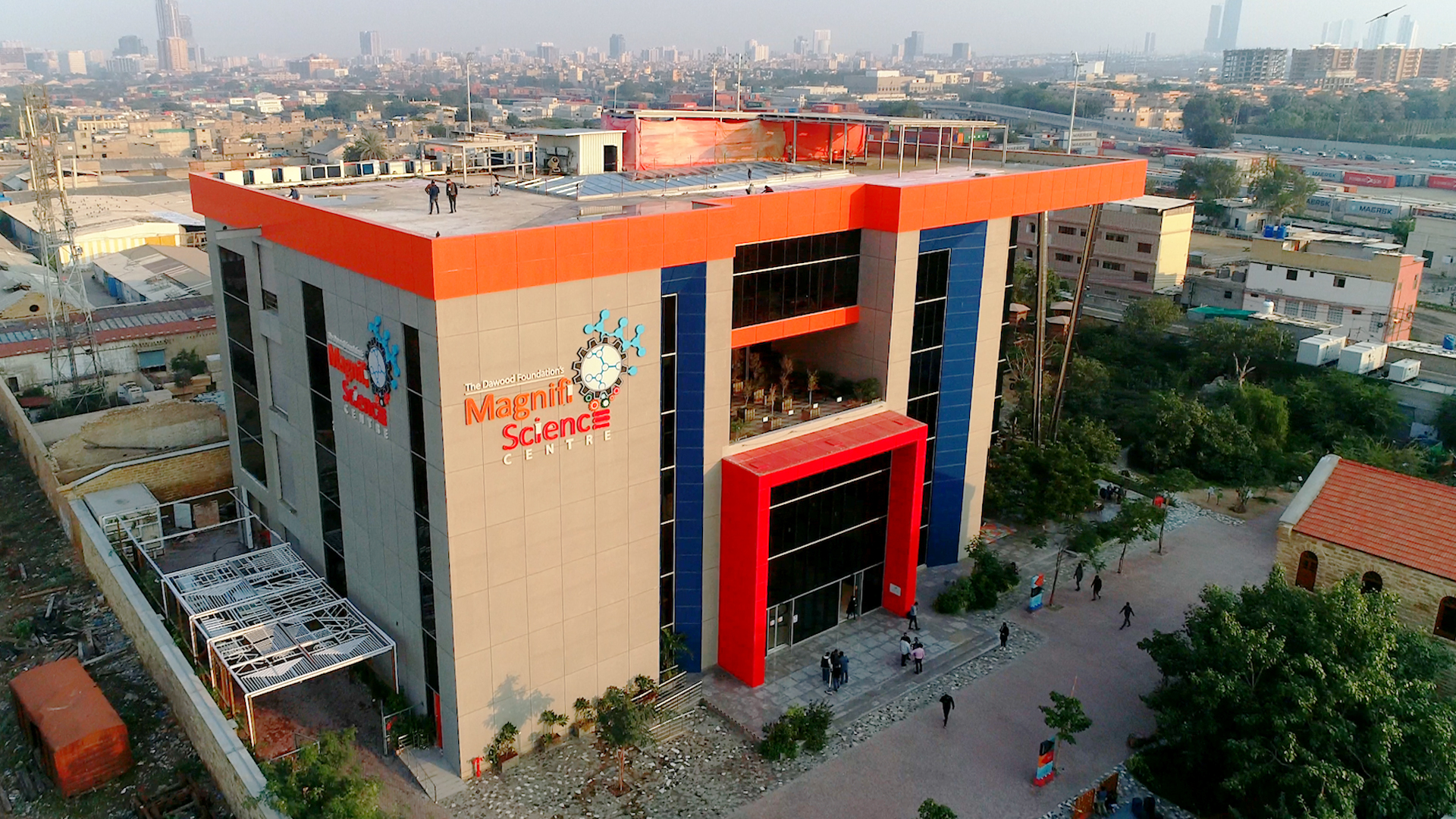
- Viewed from west to east
- Established: September 2021
- Location: Plot no 1 RY-15 Railway Quarter, Karachi, 75530, Pakistan
- Coordinates: 24°50′47″N 67°0′10″E
- Type: Science Centre
- Accreditation: International Council of Museums (ICOM), Asia Pacific Network of Science & Technology Centres (ASPAC)
- Collection size: Over 400 exhibits
- Visitors: Over 650,000 (2021–2025)
- CEO: Favad Soomro
- Chairperson: Sabrina Dawood (Vice-Chair)
- Architect: Madiha Ghani
- Owner: The Dawood Foundation
- Website: MagnifiScience Centre

The MagnifiScience Centre (MSC) is a science centre in Karachi, with a mission to develop among the populace an interest in scientific thinking, scientific literacy, and scientific methods through engagement with interactive exhibits and programmes.

The MSC's multistorey building, located in the City Railway Colony of Saddar, opened to the public in September 2021. Following its stated vision that "science is for everyone", MSC promotes scientific literacy through experiential informal learning intended to spark curiosity and encourage critical thinking and problem-solving. The MSC states an aim of reducing barriers to STEM education for the public, particularly for marginalised communities and disabled persons.

The Science Centre features over 400 interactive exhibits intended to give visitors a hands-on understanding of scientific concepts and their relation to daily life. In its first four years, the MSC attracted more than 650,000 visitors.

The MagnifiScience Centre is a project run by The Dawood Foundation, a not-for-profit organisation, certified by the Pakistan Centre for Philanthropy (PCP).

== Origins of MagnifiScience ==
In 2016, The Dawood Foundation conducted its first science exhibition, called MagnifiScience exhibition, at the Dawood Public School. Due to its success, it was held again the following year at the same premises. Pakistan's first science studio, the TDF MagnifiScience Children's Studio, subsequently opened in 2018.

In October 2018, a science exhibition was held in Islamkot, Sindh. An increasing need for a larger space led to the start of construction of the building in 2019.

In November 2021, the President of Pakistan, Arif Alvi, formally inaugurated the Science Centre.

== Building architecture ==
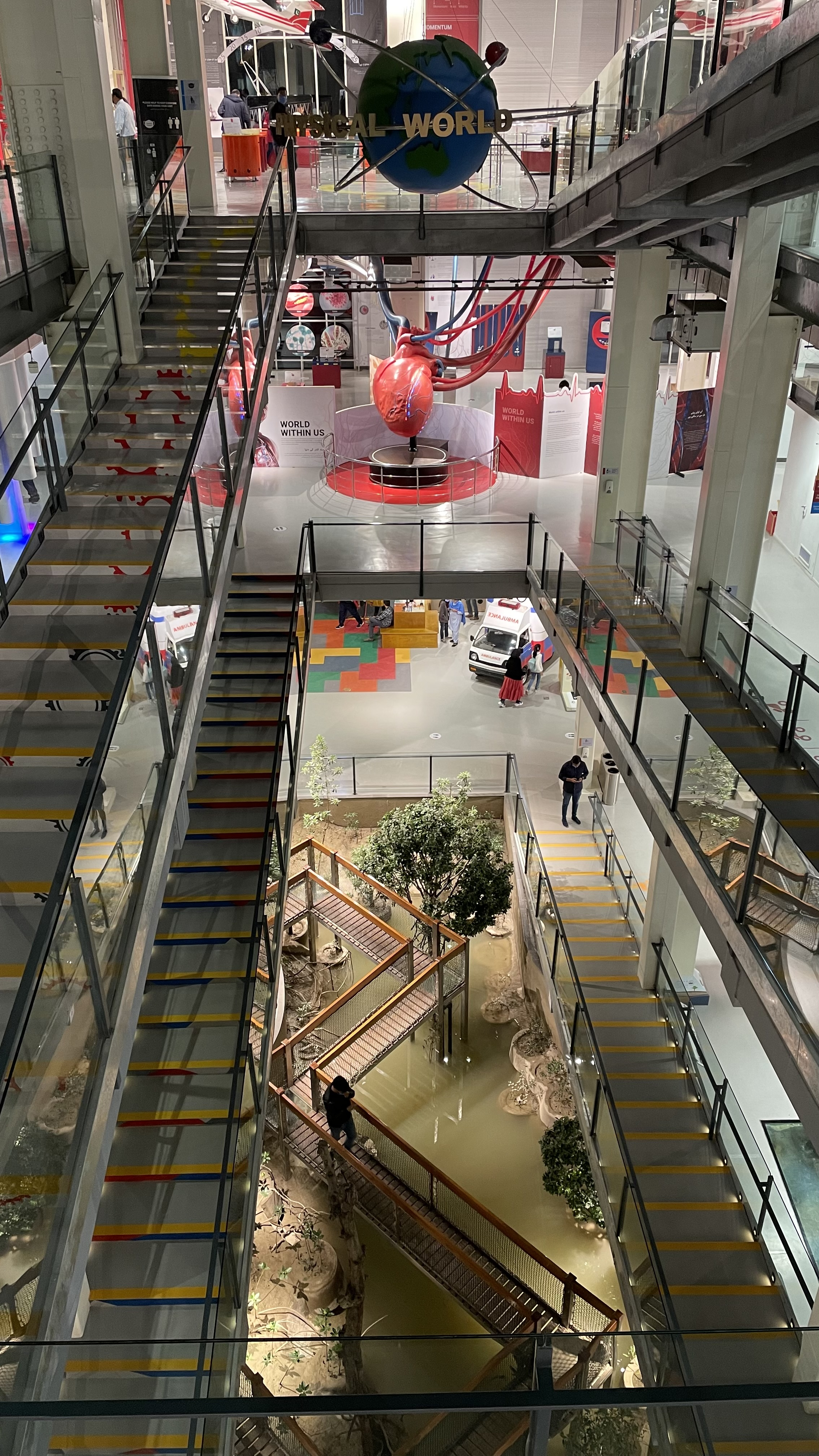
View across the floors inside the MagnifiScience Centre

The Science Centre building, spread over ground-plus-three floors, was designed by Madiha Ghani of Shahab Ghani and Associates. The MSC is a pre-engineered building, designed to be seismically sound and to minimise environmental impact. As part of its green initiatives, the premises feature a solar power system and a wastewater recycling system.

=== Interior and exhibitions ===
The over 400 exhibits across the floors address scientific topics and concepts framed in a Pakistani context, including architectural and cultural elements of Karachi, sources of food, and modes of transportation. The facility also covers the themes of the human body, light, sound, illusions, mathematics, and physics, including renewable energy, telecommunication, engineering, astronomy, and the ocean.

The building also houses a simulation of a mangrove ecosystem highlighting the importance of native flora and fauna along Pakistan's coastline.

In the centre's auditorium, science-related documentaries are screened and science-related programmes and workshops are held regularly.

== Outdoor areas ==
The original property of the science centre was formerly a colonial warehouse building located within the historic Railway Quarter. Adjacent to the property runs the Karachi Circular Railway, and the surrounding area contains a series of warehouses built during the British Raj. The site was owned by Ralli Brothers Ltd from 1888. Today, the only remains of the warehouse are the stone boundary walls around the venue and a gatehouse, which have been restored to approximate their original character.

The outdoor area also comprises the centre's Science Garden, which features a playground, a natural maze, and indigenous trees and plants.

In front of the building are outdoor exhibits, games, and a pond featuring information about the organisms living within it.

== Other activities ==
In 2022, the MSC conducted a science education programme in fifty schools, training one hundred teachers, organising field trips for over 1,000 students, and concluding with a science competition whose winners visited the U.S. Space and Rocket Center in Huntsville, Alabama.

In 2024, the MagnifiScience Thar Exhibition was held at the TCF–Dr Ashok Bakhtani Engro School Campus in Mithi, Tharparkar, featuring science projects by local students.

The centre has also repeatedly hosted the Goethe-Institut's Science Film Festival, and has repeatedly provided its outdoor space to a Children's Market. In 2025, it held a science fair featuring projects by more than 130 students who had completed its month-long Junior Internship Programme.

== See also ==
- List of science centers
