= Implosion: The Titanic Sub Disaster =

2025 documentary film about the Titan submersible implosion

- Film poster
- Directed by: Pamela Gordon
- Written by: Gary Lang
- Produced by: Natalie Dubois; Livia Simoka; Pamela Gordon; Christina De Los Reyes
- Starring: Christine Dawood; Jason Neubauer; Josh Gates; Karl Stanley; Kelly Steele; Sara Powell; Wendy Rush
- Production companies: Galafilm Productions; Renegade Stories; Beetz Brothers Film Production
- Distributed by: BBC Two (United Kingdom); Discovery Channel (United States); CBC (Canada); ZDF (Germany)
- Release dates: 27 May 2025 (United Kingdom); 28 May 2025 (United States); 18 June 2025 (Canada)
- Running time: 59–90 minutes
- Countries: United Kingdom; Canada
- Language: English

Implosion: The Titanic Sub Disaster is a 2025 documentary film directed by Pamela Gordon and written by Gary Lang. It examines the circumstances surrounding the implosion of the Titan submersible on 18 June 2023, in which five people were killed during a dive to the wreck of the Titanic. The film was co-produced by Galafilm Productions (Canada) and Renegade Stories (United Kingdom) under the Canada–UK bilateral co-production treaty, and co-commissioned by BBC Two, Discovery Channel, CBC, and ZDF. It premiered on BBC Two on 27 May 2025.

== Content ==
The documentary draws on exclusive access to the United States Coast Guard Marine Board of Investigation into the disaster, never-before-seen footage from Titan's final dive, and interviews with deep-sea exploration specialists, former OceanGate personnel, and relatives of those killed. It examines Stockton Rush's dismissal of repeated safety warnings from engineers and industry experts, the structural concerns identified during early test dives, and the systemic regulatory failures that preceded the disaster.

Christine Dawood, the widow of passenger Shahzada Dawood, who had been aboard the support vessel MVPolar Prince during the search and rescue operation, is among those interviewed. She was reported to have spoken publicly for the first time about her loss in the documentary. Submersible pilot and designer Karl Stanley, who had warned Rush about structural concerns, also features in the film.

== Production ==
The film is a co-production between Galafilm Productions, a Montreal-based company, and Renegade Stories in the United Kingdom, produced under the Canada–UK bilateral co-production treaty and supported by the UK Global Screen Fund. Beetz Brothers Film Production also contributed to the production. The executive producer is Alan Hayling; commissioning editors at the BBC were Tom Coveney, Head of Commissioning for Science, and Sarah Waldron.

The runtime differs between broadcaster versions: the BBC Two cut runs approximately 59 minutes, while the Discovery Channel version runs approximately 90 minutes.

== Release ==
The documentary premiered on BBC Two in the United Kingdom on 27 May 2025, and on Discovery Channel in the United States on 28 May 2025. The Canadian premiere took place on 18 June 2025, the second anniversary of the disaster, on CBC's science and nature series The Nature of Things, and was simultaneously made available to stream on CBC Gem and the Nature of Things YouTube channel. The documentary subsequently aired on ZDF in Germany.

== Reception ==
Writing in The Guardian, Jack Seale described the film as an account of "how five people died in an underwater deathtrap", noting that what makes it unsettling is less the implosion itself than the portrait it constructs of the ambition that preceded it.

== See also ==
- Titan submersible implosion
- Titan: The OceanGate Disaster — a separate 2025 Netflix documentary on the same subject
