= Siddique Dawood =

Pakistani industrialist and politician (died 2005)

- صدیق داؤد
- Born: Bantva, Bantva Manavadar, British India
- Died: February 2005; Karachi, Pakistan
- Occupations: Industrialist; politician; philanthropist
- Known for: Founding trustee of The Dawood Foundation; member of the National Assembly of Pakistan (1962–1964)
- Political party: Conventional Muslim League
- Relatives: Ahmed Dawood (brother)

Member of the National Assembly of Pakistan
- In office 1962–1964
- Constituency: NW-2 (Karachi-II)

Siddique Dawood (died 2005) was a Pakistani industrialist and politician who served as a member of the National Assembly of Pakistan from 1962 to 1964, representing constituency NW-2 (Karachi-II).

== Biography ==
Siddique Dawood was a brother of Ahmed Dawood (1905–2002), the founder of the Dawood Group, and migrated with him and their siblings Suleman and Sattar to Karachi following the partition of India in 1947. The four brothers established Dawood Corporation Ltd in Karachi in 1948 and subsequently expanded into multiple industrial sectors.

In 1950, a family trust was established with two purposes: to support the educational needs of the trustees' descendants and to make charitable contributions towards the advancement of education in Pakistan. Siddique Dawood served as a trustee of that trust. He was also a founding trustee of The Dawood Foundation, established in 1960. In that year, he described the Foundation's principal mission as promoting education in Pakistan, particularly in the sciences. In its early years, the Foundation maintained schools in Jessore Cantonment, East Pakistan, contributed to the Karachi University Fund, supported the Dawood Science College in Burewala, West Pakistan, and financed the construction of the Dawood Primary School in Darsono village near Malir, Karachi.

Siddique Dawood joined the Conventional Muslim League under Ayub Khan and served as its treasurer. During his time as a member of the National Assembly, he was present at Karachi's Cantonment Station to greet students returning from exile in 1963.

On 22 January 1964, Dawood inaugurated the Quaid-i-Azam Lending Library at Government College for Men Nazimabad.

Later in his career, Dawood founded BRR Capital Modaraba and Orient Insurance.

Dawood died in February 2005.
