= Christine Dawood =

British-German author and entrepreneur

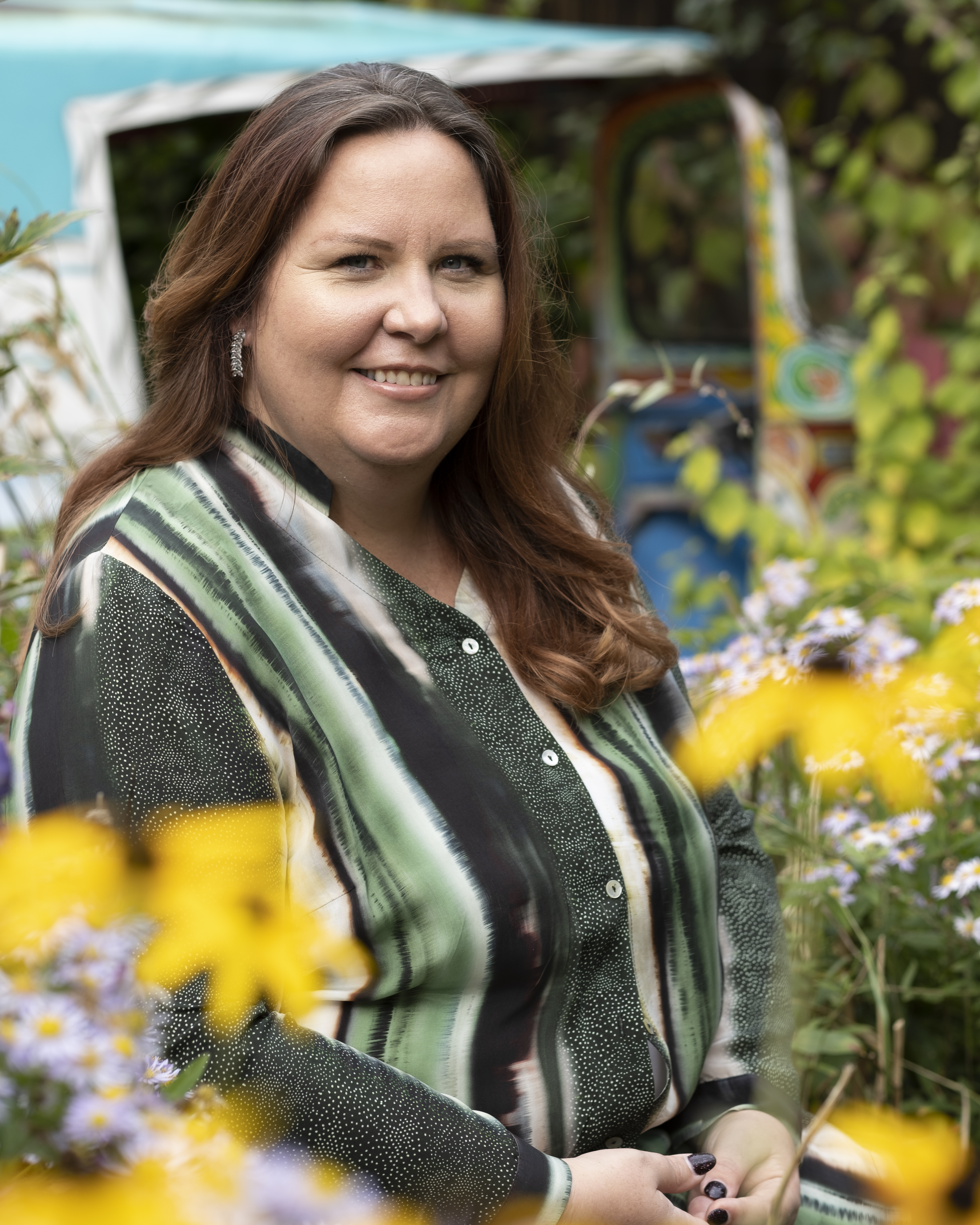
- Dawood in 2021
- Born: June 1975 (age 50); Rosenheim, West Germany
- Citizenship: Germany; United Kingdom
- Education: Reutlingen University; Saïd Business School; HEC Paris; Kingston University
- Occupations: Entrepreneur, organisational psychologist, and author
- Spouse: Shahzada Dawood (m. 2000; died 2023)
- Children: 2

Christine Dawood (born June 1975) is a British-German author. She is the widow of philanthropist Shahzada Dawood, who died alongside their son Suleman and three others when the submersible Titan imploded on 18 June 2023 during an expedition to view the wreck of the Titanic. In 2026, she published a memoir of the disaster, Ninety-Six Hours: A Wife and Mother's Desperate Search for the Lost Titan Sub.

== Early life and education ==
Dawood was born and raised in Rosenheim, West Germany, in the mountains of Bavaria. She holds a bachelor's degree in Textile Technology and Management from Reutlingen University, an executive master's degree in Change Leadership jointly from Saïd Business School, University of Oxford, and HEC Paris, and an MSc in Occupational and Business Psychology from Kingston University, London.

== Career ==
After working in Germany, Dawood founded Imhotep Organics Pvt Ltd, an organic farming company based in Lahore, Pakistan.

In 2018, she founded Next Step Now, a UK-based consultancy focused on workplace wellbeing, culture, and change leadership, which was dissolved in November 2024.

Dawood is a trustee of The Dawood Foundation, a Not-for-profit organization based in Karachi engaged in informal education and environmental projects in Pakistan. She serves on the Board of Governors of Beaconhouse National University in Lahore, is a board member of the Global Fund for Widows, and is a member of the Council of Advisors of the SETI Institute.

=== Ninety-Six Hours (2026) ===
In 2026, Dawood published Ninety-Six Hours: A Wife and Mother's Desperate Search for the Lost Titan Sub. The memoir draws on her first-hand experience aboard the search vessel Polar Prince during the 96-hour search and rescue operation following the implosion of the Titan, combining a minute-by-minute account of the crisis with personal memories of her husband and son across two decades. Dawood has stated that she wrote the book to restore a human dimension to a story that attracted intense global media attention, and to reclaim her own identity beyond her roles as wife and mother of the victims.

== Personal life ==
Dawood met Shahzada Dawood at a university in Germany in 2000 and they married in 2002. They lived in Pakistan for approximately eight years, then in Singapore, before settling in the United Kingdom, where they made their home in Surrey. They had two children: a daughter and a son, Suleman, who from September 2022 was studying business at the University of Strathclyde.

=== Titan submersible disaster ===
During the 2020 lockdown, Dawood came across an advertisement for a civilian dive to the wreck of the Titanic and arranged the booking through Quintessentially, the family's personal travel agency. Two seats on OceanGate's 2023 expedition cost $500,000. In February 2023, the Dawoods met OceanGate's CEO Stockton Rush and his wife Wendy, OceanGate's communications director, at a café on the South Bank in London to discuss the expedition. Suleman's interest in the Titanic had been sparked by a visit to the ship's centenary exhibition in Singapore in 2012, which featured artefacts salvaged from the wreck by expedition guide Paul-Henri Nargeolet.

On 16 June 2023, the family boarded the Polar Prince in St John's, Newfoundland, which carried them approximately 400 miles south-east across the North Atlantic to the dive site. On 18 June 2023, Shahzada Dawood (aged 48) and Suleman Dawood (aged 19) joined the Titan alongside Rush (aged 61), British businessman Hamish Harding (aged 58), and Nargeolet (aged 77), who had previously dived to the Titanic wreck 37 times. Dawood had been allocated a place on the dive; at the last minute Suleman asked for her seat, and she gave it to him. She and her daughter remained aboard the Polar Prince.

Communications with the Titan were lost at approximately 11am on 18 June. At 6.30pm, OceanGate's mission director Kyle Bingham declared the submersible officially missing. During the four-day search and rescue operation that followed, the Dawood family contacted the British High Commissioner, whose intervention helped secure the release of a deep-water remotely operated vehicle for the search. On 22 June 2023, a remotely operated vehicle deployed from the vessel Horizon Arctic located a debris field approximately 500 metres from the bow of the Titanic, at a depth of 3,800 metres. The United States Coast Guard confirmed that a catastrophic implosion had occurred approximately two hours into the dive, killing all five men instantly.

A subsequent US Coast Guard investigation concluded that the disaster was preventable, attributing it to inadequate engineering and testing and to Rush's disregard of repeated safety warnings. The report found that had Rush survived, he would have faced criminal proceedings. Tighter regulation of passenger submersibles was recommended. Nine months after the disaster, the remains of Shahzada and Suleman Dawood were recovered from the seabed and returned to the family.

Following the disaster, Dawood has spoken publicly about her grief, describing panic attacks, prolonged therapy, and the difficulty of returning to ordinary life. She has said that Suleman's room remains as he left it and her husband's study is untouched. She subsequently walked from Hampton Court to Glasgow, a journey of five weeks, in tribute to Suleman, who had expressed a wish to make the same journey.

Dawood participated in the 2025 documentary Implosion: The Titanic Sub Disaster, co-produced by the Montreal-based company Galafilm and UK's Renegade Stories, and co-commissioned by CBC, BBC, and Discovery Channel US. She also has plans to establish a grief and trauma centre.

== Works ==
- Ninety-Six Hours: A Wife and Mother's Desperate Search for the Lost Titan Sub. London: Whitefox, 2026. ISBN 9781918191042
