= Sehat Kahani =

Pakistani telehealth company

- Industry: Telemedicine
- Predecessor: doctHERs
- Founded: 2017
- Founder: Iffat Zafar Aga and Sara Saeed Khurram
- Headquarters: Karachi, Pakistan

Sehat Kahani is a Pakistan-based telemedicine company.

== Background ==
Sehat Kahani has a business model that responds to a societal circumstances in Pakistan whereby qualified women doctors are commonly prevented from working in hospitals. They employ women doctors, who work from home, providing tele-health services to patients in rural parts of Pakistan that are short of qualified healthcare providers.

== Nomenclature ==
Sehat Kahani is Urdu for "Story of Health."

== Organization ==
Sehat Kahani is based in Karachi and run by Iffat Zafar Aga M.D. and Dr. Sara Saeed Khurram M.D.

Sehat Kahani was in formed in February 2017 as a for-profit spin off of healthcare startup docters.

== Services ==
Sehat Kahani delivers healthcare services in 35 rural clinics in Pakistan where female patients pay a fee to speak to women doctor via telemedicine. Sehat Kahani has treated over one million patients. In 2021, Sehat Kahani started a pilot program that expanded their work into 60 hospital intensive care units in Pakistan.

Patients are met at clinics by a nurse, who does an initial examinations before passing patient care over to a doctor, that connects by digital video link. In 2017, the Sehat Kahani network included 500 doctors, of which most are contractors, and 30 are employees. In 2020, another 100 doctors were added with support of private donors to the network. Patients pay between 50 and 500 rupees per visit.

Sehat Kahani was one of five winners of the Global 2021 We Empower United Nations Sustainable Development Goal Challenge.
