= Engro Foundation =

Pakistani non-profit trust

- اینگرو فاؤنڈیشن
- Formation: 2009; 17 years ago
- Founder: Engro Corporation
- Type: Not for Profit Organisation
- Legal status: Registered Trust
- Headquarters: Karachi-75600, Sindh, Pakistan
- Region served: Pakistan
- Key people: Favad Soomro (CEO)
- Employees: 11
- Website: engrofoundation.com

Engro Foundation Urdu: اینگرو فاؤنڈیشن is a not-for-profit trust headquartered in Karachi, Pakistan. It was founded in 2009 as a philanthropic arm of Engro.

Engro Foundation provides access for local communities to “basic services, for example education, health, water, sanitation, and infrastructure” but also to medical assistance, skills development, technical training, and supports environmental conversation projects and sports.

== History ==
Engro Corporation founded Engro Foundation in 2009 to ensure that the benefits of business operations can help solving issues that exist within Engro's value chains and the livelihoods of its immediate community.

== Projects ==
Engro Foundation's initiatives are focusing on healthcare, medical assistance, education, skill development, environmental and biodiverse conversation, infrastructure, emergency response, and support and promotion of sports. Engro Foundation works with local communities in Sindh and Punjab.

Along with The Dawood Foundation the Engro Foundation disburses the funds of the Hussain Dawood Pledge, one of the biggest private donations and initiatives to fight against the COVID-19 pandemic in Pakistan.

Engro Foundation provides training and education initiatives, like free-of-cost education in schools across Sindh and Punjab, and skills development at the Technical Training College – the first Polytechnic institute offering a Diploma in Associate Engineering.

In its work on biodiversity conservation Engro Foundation collaborates with World Wide Fund for Nature (WWF Pakistan) for alternative income streams of fishing communities, educational programmes for sustainable fishing practices, and the conservation of the endangered Indus river dolphin.

In context of flood relief efforts Engro Foundation engaged in the 2022 floods but also supported flood effected population earlier.

Engro Foundation launched in 2012 "I Am the Change" to recognise local NGOs or activists who are working to enable positive, meaningful, scalable, and sustainable change in the country. Through a prise-money of the annual awards for individuals and/or organisations selected projects can scale up for broader impact.

== Governance ==
The Foundation is governed by a board of trustees. The Foundation operates daily under the leadership of Favad Soomro.
