= Dawood Group =

Pakistani business group

The Dawood Group
- Native name: داؤد گروپ
- Type: Private
- Industry: Conglomerate
- Founded: 1948
- Founder: Ahmed Dawood
- Headquarters: Karachi, Sindh, Pakistan
- Area served: Pakistan
- Key people: Hussain Dawood
- Products: Diversified businesses
- Owner: Dawood family
- Subsidiaries: Dawood Hercules

The Dawood Group (Urdu: داؤد گروپ) is a term used in Pakistan to describe a collection of diversified businesses owned by the Dawood family. The family's business activities were initiated by Ahmed Dawood (1905-2002).

The Dawood Group does not constitute a formally registered legal entity. It serves as a collective designation for the diverse commercial interests held by the Dawood family. The primary vehicle within this framework is Dawood Corporation (Pvt.) Limited, a family-owned company established in 1948.

The Dawood family established and expanded its industrial and commercial activities during the early decades following the independence of Pakistan, particularly in the 1950s and 1960s. The group's operations are headquartered in Karachi and encompass a range of sectors across industry and commerce. Ownership remains with the Dawood family.

== History ==
Ahmed Dawood was considered as one of the country's senior industrialists. By 1933, his firm had become the largest supplier of imported yarn to the textile mills in India. Following the Partition of British India in 1947, he migrated to Pakistan with his brothers Suleman Dawood, Siddique Dawood, Sattar Dawood, and Ali Mohammad Dawood.

In 1948, the family established Dawood Corporation (Pvt.) Limited in Karachi as a trade enterprise. In the same year, Dawood (England) Limited started business operations in Manchester. The group began with a small office and a retail outlet in Saddar and expanded its business significantly over the decades.

By 1970, the combined undertakings of the Dawood family was one of the largest business groups in the country. The following year marked a substantial change: After the creation of Bangladesh in 1971, approximately 60% of the businesses led by Ahmed Dawood, including all investments in former East Pakistan, were lost as a result of the nationalisation policies there. The remaining enterprises in Pakistan were affected by nationalisation measures implemented in the early to mid-1970s.

== Former subsidiaries ==
=== West Pakistan (later Pakistan) ===
- Burewala Textile Mills, established by the Punjab Government in 1952, was acquired in May 1957 from Pakistan Industrial Development Corporation (PIDC) and later merged into Dawood Lawrencepur Limited in 2004
- Central Insurance Company, founded on 15 August 1960, was later known as Cyan Limited
- Dawood Mines, it was established with a paid-up capital of Rs. 0.5 million and was involved in coal mining
- Dawood Cotton Mills Limited, foundation in 1951 in Landhi, Karachi, merged into Dawood Lawrencepur Limited in 2004
- Dilon Limited, merged into Dawood Lawrencepur Limited
- Lawrencepur Woolen & Textile Mills Limited, merged into Dawood Lawrencepur Limited
- Memon Cooperative Bank, it was founded in 1958 by Dawood family as an intra-caste credit bank for Memon community. The bank had a paid-up capital of Rs. 1 million and was nationalised in 1974.
- Dawood Petroleum, nationalised in 1973, now part of Pakistan State Oil

=== East Pakistan (later Bangladesh) ===
- Karnaphuli Paper Mills at Chandraghona, East Pakistan - management took over from PIDC in October 1959
- Karnaphuli Rayon & Chemical
- Dawood Jute Mills
- Dawood Shipping

== See also ==
- List of largest companies in Pakistan
- Dawood Hercules
