= Hussain Dawood =

Pakistani businessman (born 1943)

Hussain Dawood HI(C)
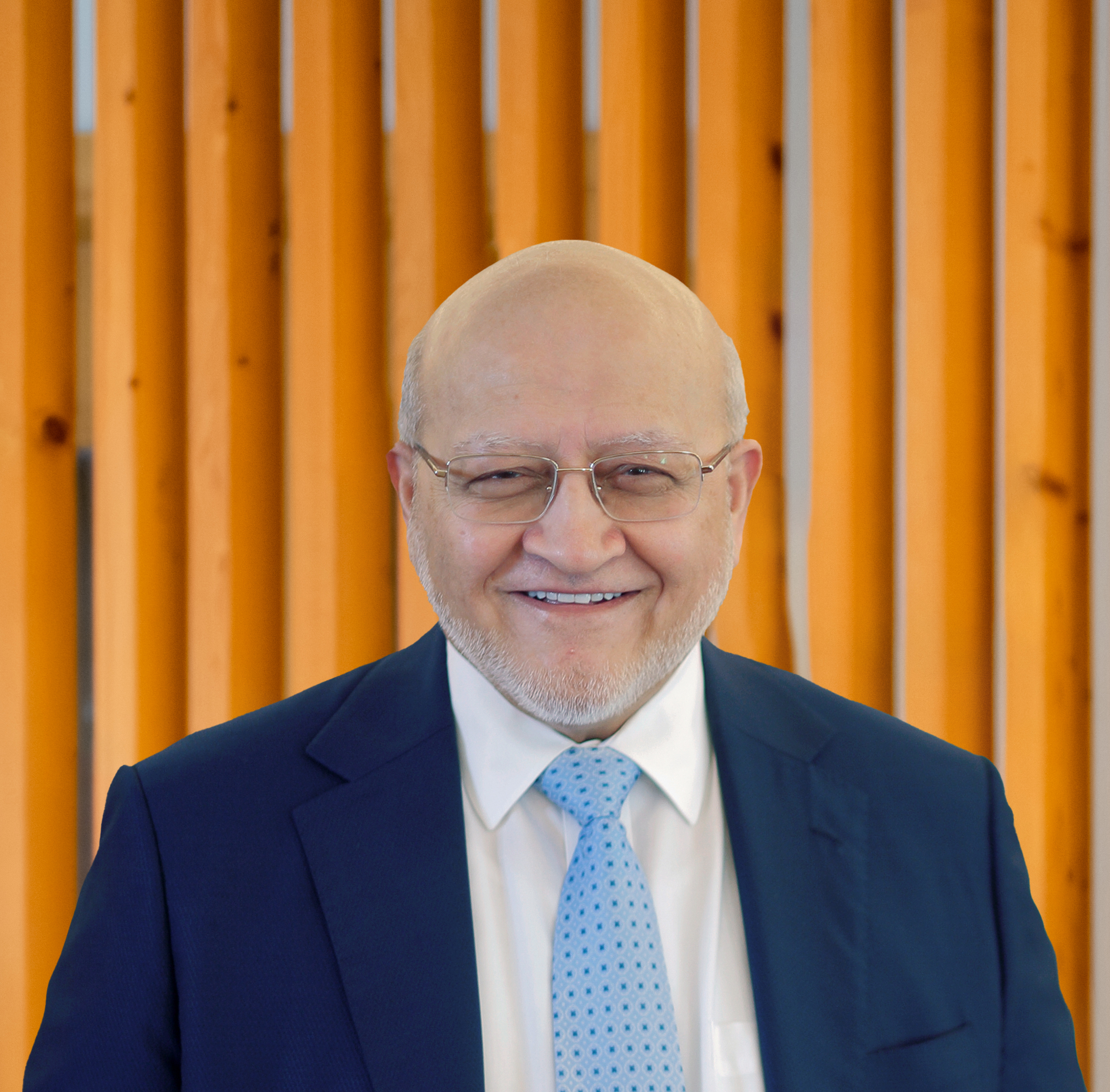
- Born: 20 September 1943 (age 83); Bombay, Bombay Presidency, British India
- Citizenship: Maltese (Note: Dawood holds Maltese citizenship since 2016, reportedly through an individual investor programme.); Pakistani
- Education: Sheffield Hallam University (BEng); Northwestern University (MBA)
- Occupations: Chairman; philanthropist
- Years active: 1968–present
- Known for: Charity during the COVID-19 pandemic in Pakistan (2020); Founding of Karachi School of Business & Leadership (2010)
- Title: See list: Chair of Engro Holdings; Chairman and founder of Karachi School of Business & Leadership; Chairman of The Dawood Foundation
- Spouse: Kulsum Dawood (m. 1968)
- Children: 4, including Shahzada and Sabrina
- Parents: Ahmed Dawood; Mariam Bai
- Awards: Order of Merit of the Italian Republic (2008); Hilal-e-Imtiaz (2024)

Hussain Dawood (Note: Urdu: حسین داؤد, pronounced [hʊˈseɪn ˈdɑːwʊd].) (born 20 September 1943) is a Pakistani businessman and philanthropist who is the chairman of Engro Holdings and The Dawood Foundation. He is also the chairman of the Karachi School of Business & Leadership (KSBL).

== Early life and education ==
Dawood was born on 20 September 1943 in Bombay, British India (now Mumbai) into a Memon family. His father, Ahmed Dawood, a businessperson, moved to Karachi with his family during the partition of India in 1947.

Dawood studied metallurgy at Sheffield Hallam University, graduating in 1966. He went on to study at the Kellogg School of Management, Northwestern University, and received in 1968 a Master of Business Administration.

== Career ==
After completion of his studies, Dawood joined the family business in Pakistan as a finance director. In 1973, he became the managing director of Dawood Lawrencepur, a public limited company specialising in textiles. In 1981, Dawood became the chief executive officer (CEO) of Dawood Hercules.

In the late 1990s, he spearheaded the expansion of the company, including the acquisition of Engro. Following the death of his father he took over as chairman of Dawood Hercules Corporation. In 2006, Dawood became chairman of Engro Corporation.

Dawood has expanded the business interests of his companies. His experience consists of managing, supervising and controlling family businesses and chairing listed companies. This has involved a number of joint ventures over the years with European, US, Japanese and Chinese parties, such as Royal Vopak, FrieslandCampina, and China Machinery Engineering Corporation.

== Philanthropy ==
Dawood was chairman of the Pakistan Poverty Alleviation Fund. He is the founding donor of the Mariam Dawood School of Visual Arts & Design at the Beaconhouse National University Tarogil Campus, in Lahore. Through the Dawood Foundation, he has supported relief efforts for the 2004 Indian Ocean earthquake and tsunami, the 2005 Kashmir earthquake, and the 2010 Pakistan floods.

He is also the founder and chairman of the Karachi School of Business and Leadership (KSBL), a graduate management institution dedicated to developing effective leaders.

During the COVID-19 pandemic in Pakistan, he pledged Rs 1bn on behalf of Engro Corporation and Dawood Hercules Group to support national relief efforts.

Dawood donated towards the purchase of a former church in St. John's, Newfoundland and Labrador, which was converted into the Shaheed Suleman Dawood Mosque, opened in 2025 in memory of his grandson and as a contribution to the local Muslim community.

== Personal life ==
Hussain Dawood is married to Kulsum. The couple had four children; Azmeh, Shahzada, Sabrina and Samad. Dawood is based in Dubai.

In June 2023, Dawood lost his son Shahzada and his 19-year-old grandson, Suleman. Both died alongside three others inside the submersible Titan when it imploded on a tourist expedition to view the wreck of the Titanic.

== Awards and recognition ==
- In 2025, the President of Pakistan awarded Dawood the Hilal-i-Imtiaz, the country's second-highest civil honour, in recognition of his contributions to social service.
- Officer of the Order of Merit of the Italian Republic (Ufficiale Ordine al Merito della Repubblica Italiana) (Italy) (2 June 2008).
