= TDF Ghar =

Karachi museum and community space

- ٹی ڈی ایف گھر۔
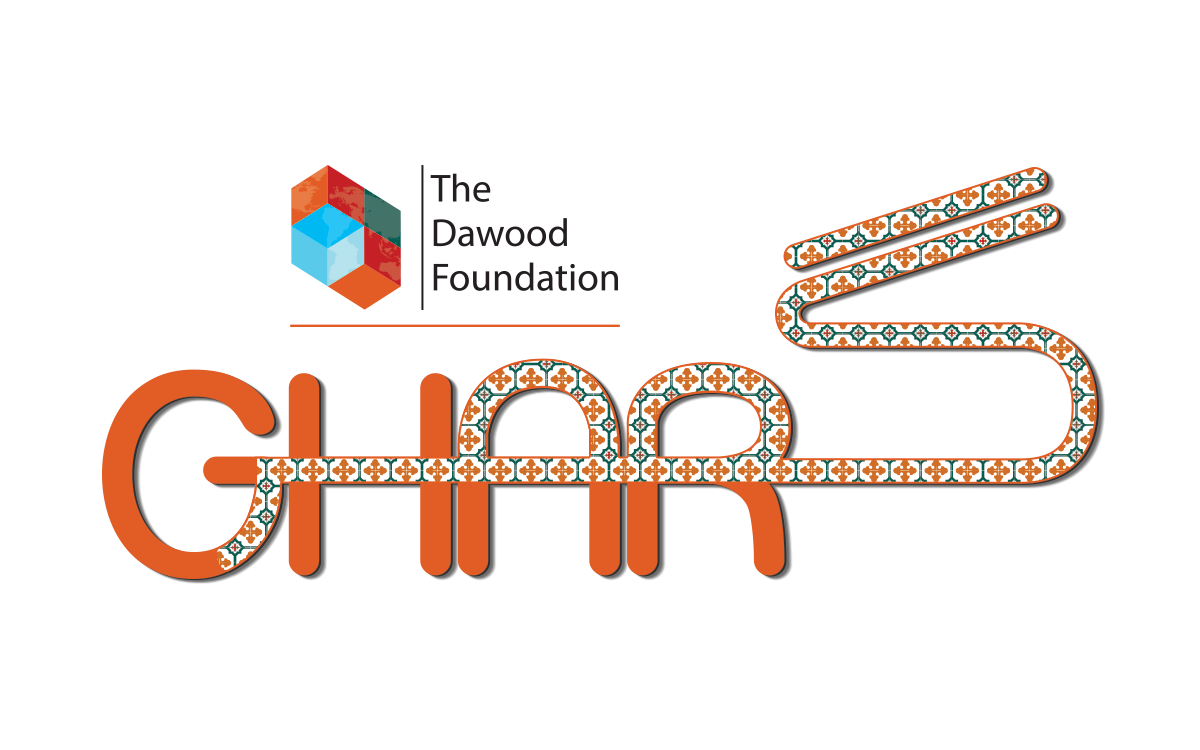

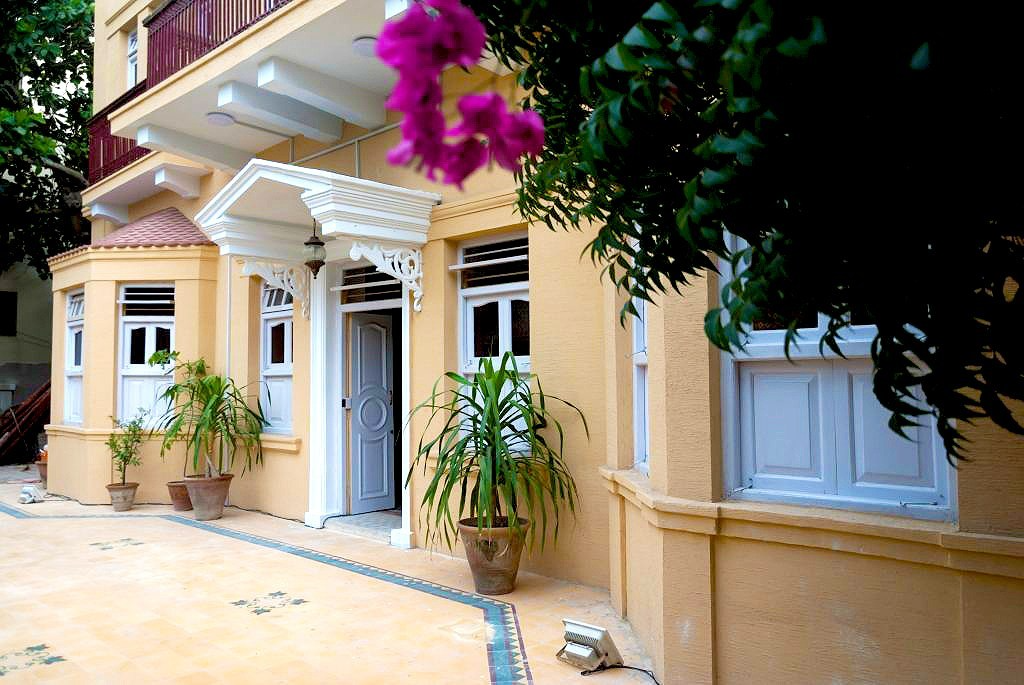
- TDF Ghar is a 'living museum' of the past and an informal learning space.

General information
- Architectural style: Hybrid of Advani and Jiwani style planning. Court style housing.
- Location: 47 Amil Colony No 1, M.A. Jinnah Road, Soldier Bazaar, Catholic Colony, Karachi, Pakistan
- Coordinates: 24.8778497°N 67.0380648°E
- Construction started: 1930s
- Renovated: 2016–2017
- Client: Haribai Motiram

Technical details
- Structural system: Composite
- Size: 595.3 square metres

Design and construction
- Architect: unknown

Website
- The Dawood Foundation: TDF Ghar

The TDF Ghar (House in Urdu) is an informal learning space situated in Karachi, Pakistan. The residential building was constructed in the 1930s and has been restored as a living museum. The Dawood Foundation (TDF) has retained the heritage architectural features of the house to preserve the living style of the past residents of cosmopolitan Karachi.

== Background ==
The House was originally constructed in the 1930s under an almond tree with hand-crafted tiles. It belonged to a Hindu woman, Haribai Motiram, who later sold it to the Dawood family's ancestors.

The house is situated in the East-Karachi neighborhood Jamshed Quarters and is accessible through Muhammad Ali Jinnah Road. Jamshed Quarters was envisioned by then-Mayor and philanthropist Jamshed Nusserwanjee Mehta as a home for the growing middle class of Karachi. It was home to multiple ethnicities and people of different faith, like Muslims, Hindus, Christians, Parsis, and Jews.

The Dawood Foundation restored the building from 2016 onwards and TDF Ghar was open to public as of August 2017.

== Features ==
TDF Ghar is an informal learning space for the citizens of Karachi to gather and exchange. The house retains its heritage features but has been transformed into a public space. With its unique mix of a museum and cultural programme, it also attracts tourists. It reflects upon Karachi's past, the mix of cultures that it presented, and the kinds of lives that people lived during pre-independence time. The three 'Numaish Halls' and a training room in the building's first floor can be utilised for organising workshops, training, seminars, exhibitions, and other activities.

== The Living Room (Museum) ==
TDF Ghar's 'Living Room' has been restored with original fixtures and is being used as a museum for historical collections. The tiles used in the living room are handmade and were made in the Jamshed Nusserwanji factory.

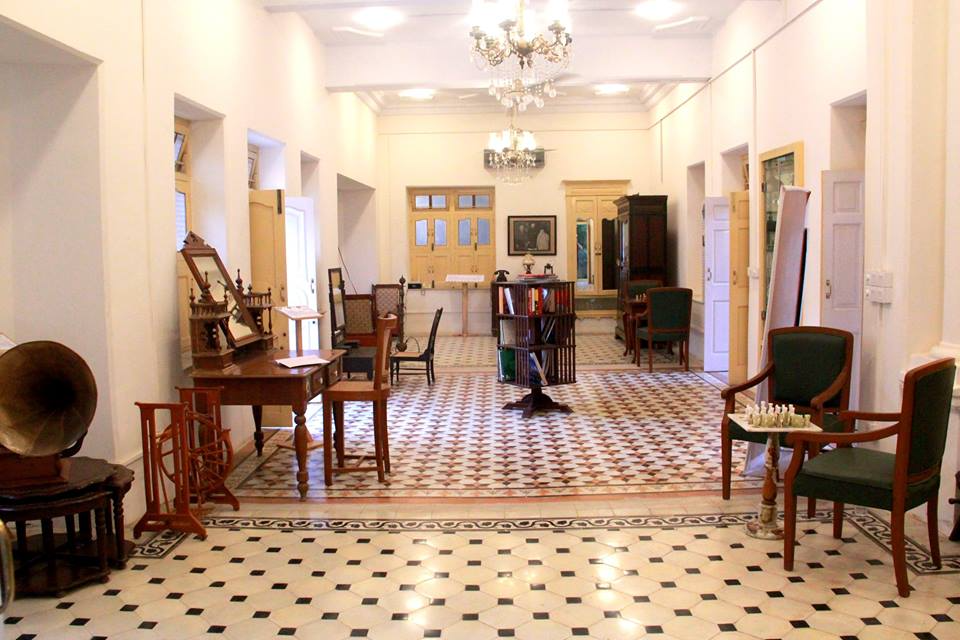
The main room of the TDF Ghar serves as the museum.

'The Living Room' also has antique pieces and furniture such as vintage chess sets, a glass cupboard with fine china, an original silica treadle sewing machine, gramophone, radio, telephone, typewriter, and lamps, from as early as the 1930s. The European style sofas, Parsi furniture, Anglo-Indian vanity dressing table, and Irani chairs, present a mixture of different cultures and portray the ethnic inclusive nature of Karachi.

== Numaish Hall ==
Three Numaish (Exhibition in Urdu) Halls on the upper floor of TDF Ghar act as empty multi-purpose spaces. Art exhibitions, talks, film screenings, performances, large meetings, and workshops are taking place there.

== Sehan Café ==
On the veranda of TDF Ghar’s back-side is a small café named Sehan Café. It harnesses the Irani café culture that Karachi had been famous for, with bentwood chairs.

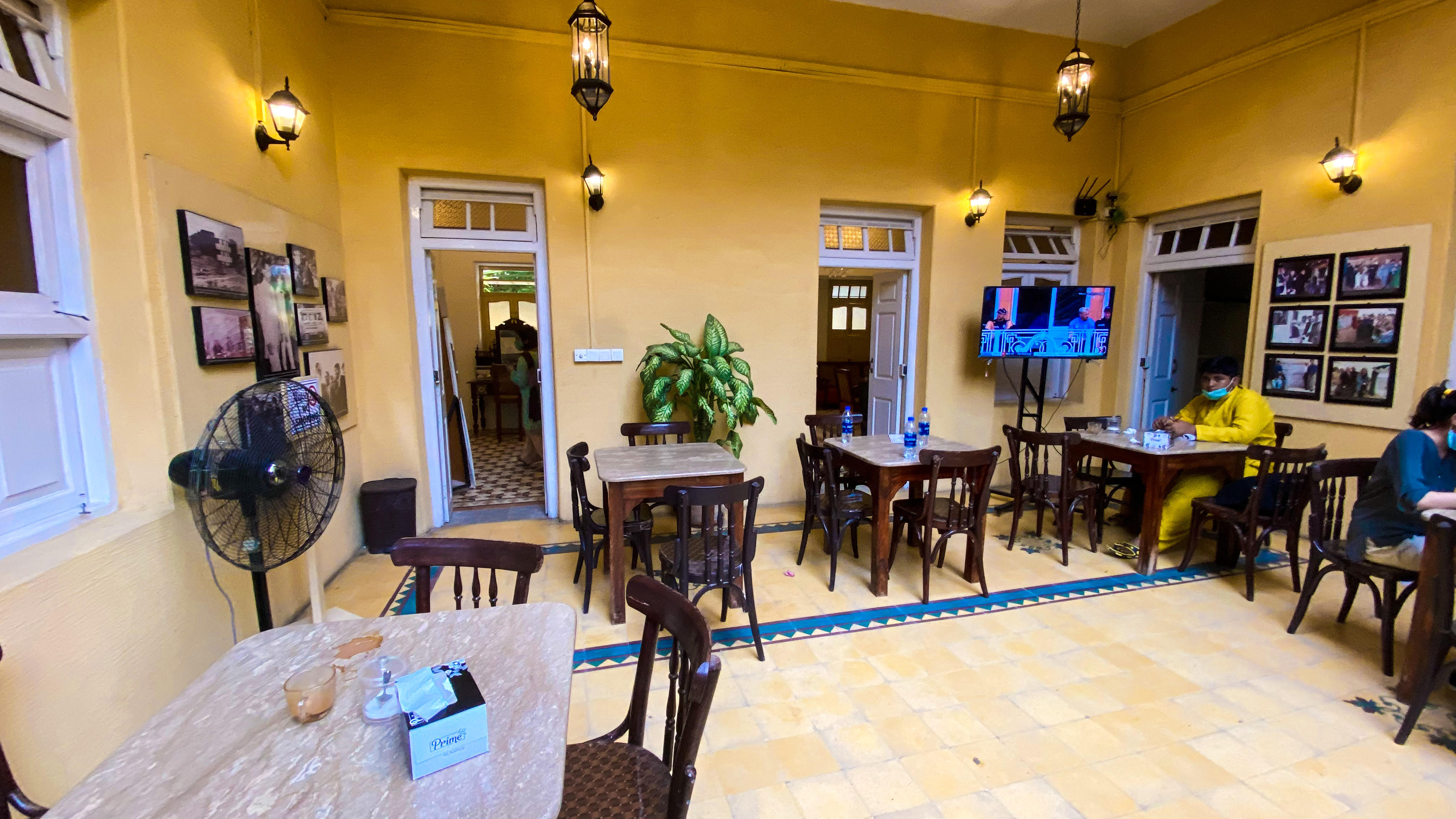
The TDF Ghar's café in the backyard of the building.

== Library ==
On the first floor is a book-swapping library in collaboration with Junaid Akram's project – The Novel Idea. Visitors can read any book or swap their books with any book from the same genre. There are more than 2500 books in various categories such as fiction, non-fiction, children, history, and much more.

== Rooftop View of Mazar-e-Quaid ==
The rooftop at TDF Ghar is a wide space directly looking over the Quaid's Mausoleum. It is one of the few locations in the city which directly overlooks the mazaar, the very symbol of Karachi.

== Exhibitions ==
To promote the strength, uniqueness, and charm of each culture, community, and gender, TDF Ghar hosts various exhibitions. Here is some information about a few selected exhibitions:

- Karachi Khichri

Opened in July 2026, it explores how migration and everyday life, through kitchens, markets, and food, shaped Karachi into one of the world's most diverse cities.

- From Borders to Belongings: Karachi's Journey Through Migration

This exhibition, inaugurated in January 2025, explores the impact of the 1947 Partition on Karachi.

- Karachi's Transformation: Harchandrai's Journey

This exhibition, launched on 11 December 2023, presents Karachi's development from the late 1800s to the early 1900s, highlighting the role of Seth Harchandrai Vishandas in shaping the city's urban, infrastructural and civic landscape.

- The Groovy Years: Karachi of the 60s and 70s

The exhibition, started in February 2022, is a snapshot of Karachi's cosmopolitan history, the mix of cultures that it represented, and the kinds of lives people had there over half a century ago.

- The Jinnahs

An exhibition reflecting on the women that were a part of Muhammad Ali Jinnah's life was hosted from 16 January to 10 February 2018. The Jinnah's showcased the personal life of Pakistan's Founder Quaid e Azam along with the influence of the three most important women in his life – Fatima Ali Jinnah, Ruttie Jinnah and Dina Wadia.

- To China, with Love

TDF Ghar hosted the exhibition, Chinese New Year, on 25 February 2018. To China, with Love represented Pakistan and China's connected history as well as their unique culture and traditions. This exhibition also described how the two countries share strong, strategic ties.

- Henna sey Eid

Henna sey Eid is a special Eid exhibition that is held every year on Chaand Raat, and arrangements are made where ladies can come and apply mehndi. This exhibition is about discovering the history of henna, its cultural significance, and its long roots with Islamic traditions around the world.

- The man who built Karachi – Moses Somake

The man who built Karachi – Moses Somake, was an exhibition which was designed for Karachiites to celebrate the work of Iraqi descent architect. This pioneer architect was the mastermind behind many stone buildings of this colonial city. The exhibition was held from 11 August to 15 October 2018.

- Karachi in the 1950s and All that Jazz

This exhibition was held from January to March 2019. It celebrated the history of Karachi. Featuring music, cinemas, eateries, and more from the 1950s, the exhibition's most popular attraction was the photobooth and props.

- Karachi ka Keamari

Karachi ka Keamari was an exhibition designed to explore the history of Pakistan's largest and busiest seaport. It was made interactive through documentaries, a photobooth, and a crane exhibit.
