= Dawood Public School =

Girl school in Karachi

- داؤد پبلک سکول
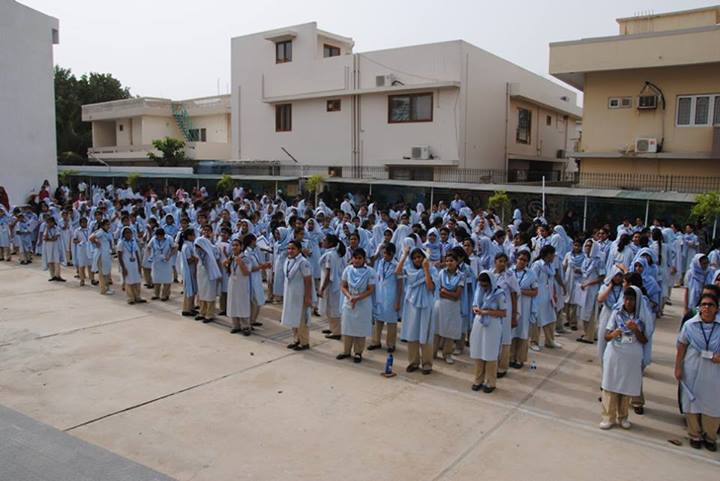
- Assembly hall at Dawood Public School

Location
- ST-1, Dawood Cooperative Housing Society, Bahadurabad; Karachi, Sindh, 74800; Pakistan
- Coordinates: 24.8885°N 67.0704°E

Information
- Type: Not-for-profit institution
- Motto: Enlighten my soul, enlighten my being
- Religious affiliations: Open for all religions, no restrictions.
- Established: 4 April 1983
- Founder: Ahmed Dawood
- Principal: Iffat Basrai
- Grades: Preschool–11th (O1)
- Gender: Girls
- Age: 2 to 18
- Enrollment: ca. 2500
- Classes: Preschool to O-level/IGCSE
- Language: English and Urdu
- Hours in school day: Varying from 3 to 6.5 hours
- Houses: Bilquis Edhi, Bapsi Sidhwa, Fatima Jinnah, Anita Ghulam
- Colors: Sky blue, Beige
- Mascot: Candle and Book
- Graduates: Dawoodians
- Website: DPS Website

Dawood Public School (DPS) is a trust owned institution that offers education to over 2500 girls in Karachi, Pakistan.

DPS is affiliated with Cambridge University and offers an educational program for girls aged 2 to 18 years. DPS provide preschool, primary education, secondary education and preparation for the International General Certificate of Education (IGCSE).

== History ==
DPS was established in 1983 by Ahmed Dawood. He took the initiative to promote education among women. Offering Science, Mathematics, and popular electives like Global Perspectives and English Literature, the school provides classes from Nursery to O Levels.

== Faculty ==
The faculty of DPS consists of a Principal, along with a Section Head for its Pre-Primary, Primary, and Secondary Sections. The teachers are highly qualified subject specialists, well-trained for their respective role.

== Events and achievements ==
=== Sports ===
Sports are popular extra-curricular activity at DPS. Inter-school throwball, cricket, volleyball, and basketball competitions are well-attended.

=== Connecting with community ===
Incorporating values of public service, the DPS Festival of Lights donated funds to Bait-ul-Sukoon Cancer Hospital and Hospice, as well as Lady Dufferin Hospital.

Promoting critical thinking, Sabrina Dawood conceptualised a science exhibition, that led to the creation of the MagnifiScience Centre.

The DPS Evening Session provides free education to underprivileged students. The Dawood Development Unit supports individuals with special needs, aiming to integrate them into mainstream education.

== Gallery ==
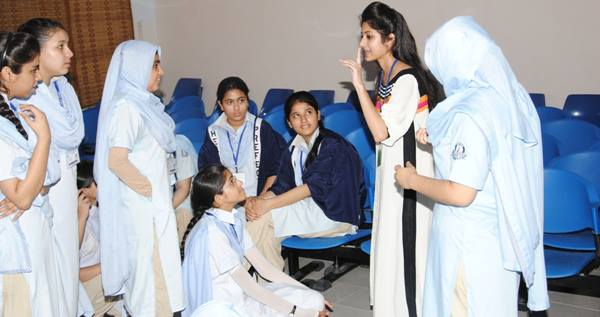
Extra Activities at Dawood Public School

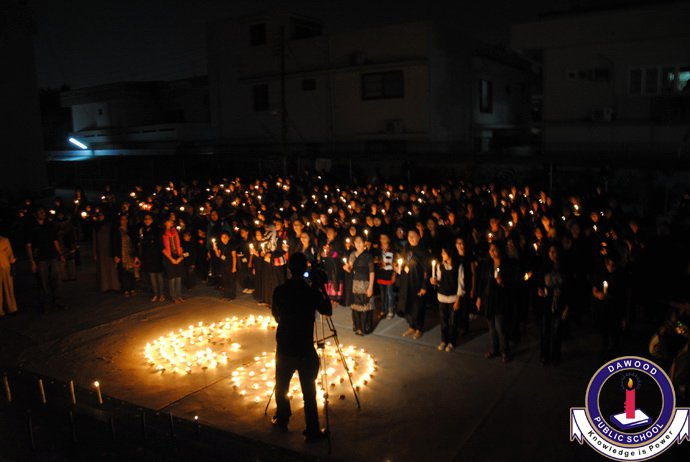
Evening Event at Dawood public School

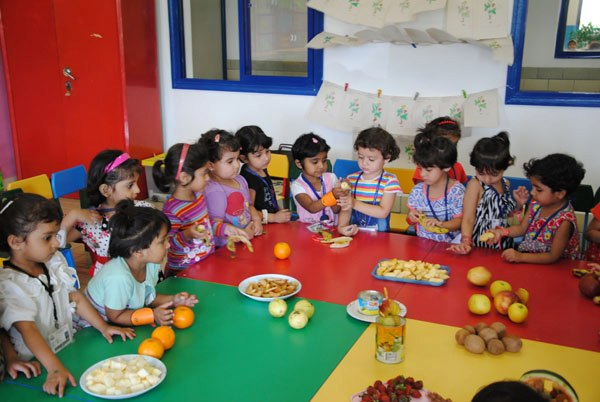
Fruit Day Celebration at Dawood Public School

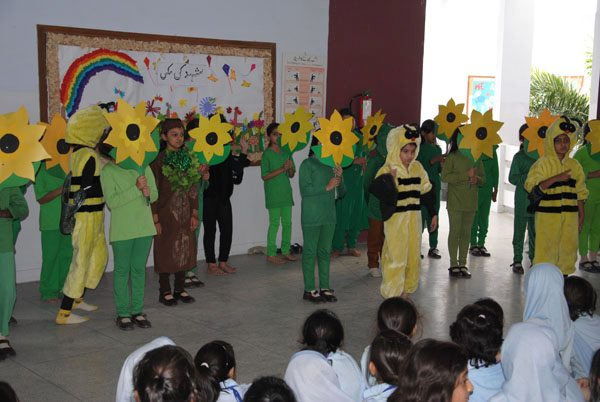
Events Organized by Dawood Public School

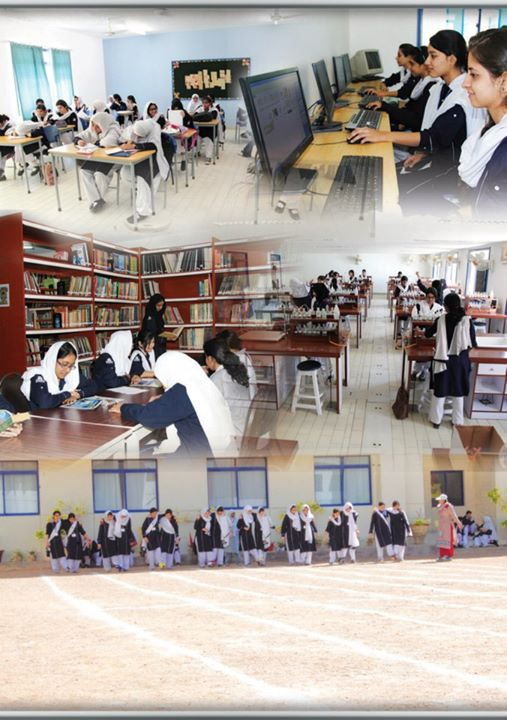
Dawood Public School at a glance

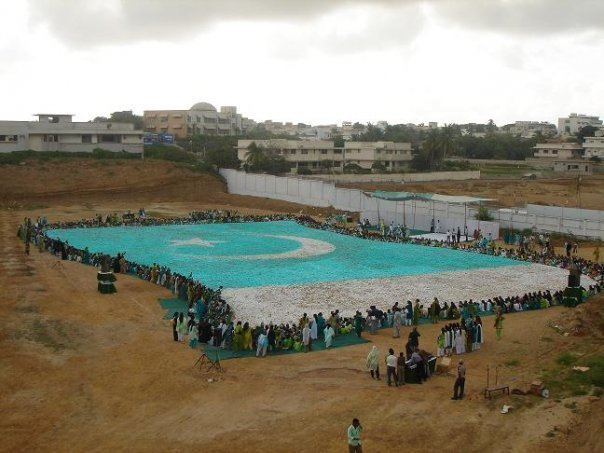
Dalmun organized by Dawood Public School
