= Ahmed Dawood =

Pakistani industrialist and philanthropist (1905–2002)

Ahmed Dawood احمد داؤد
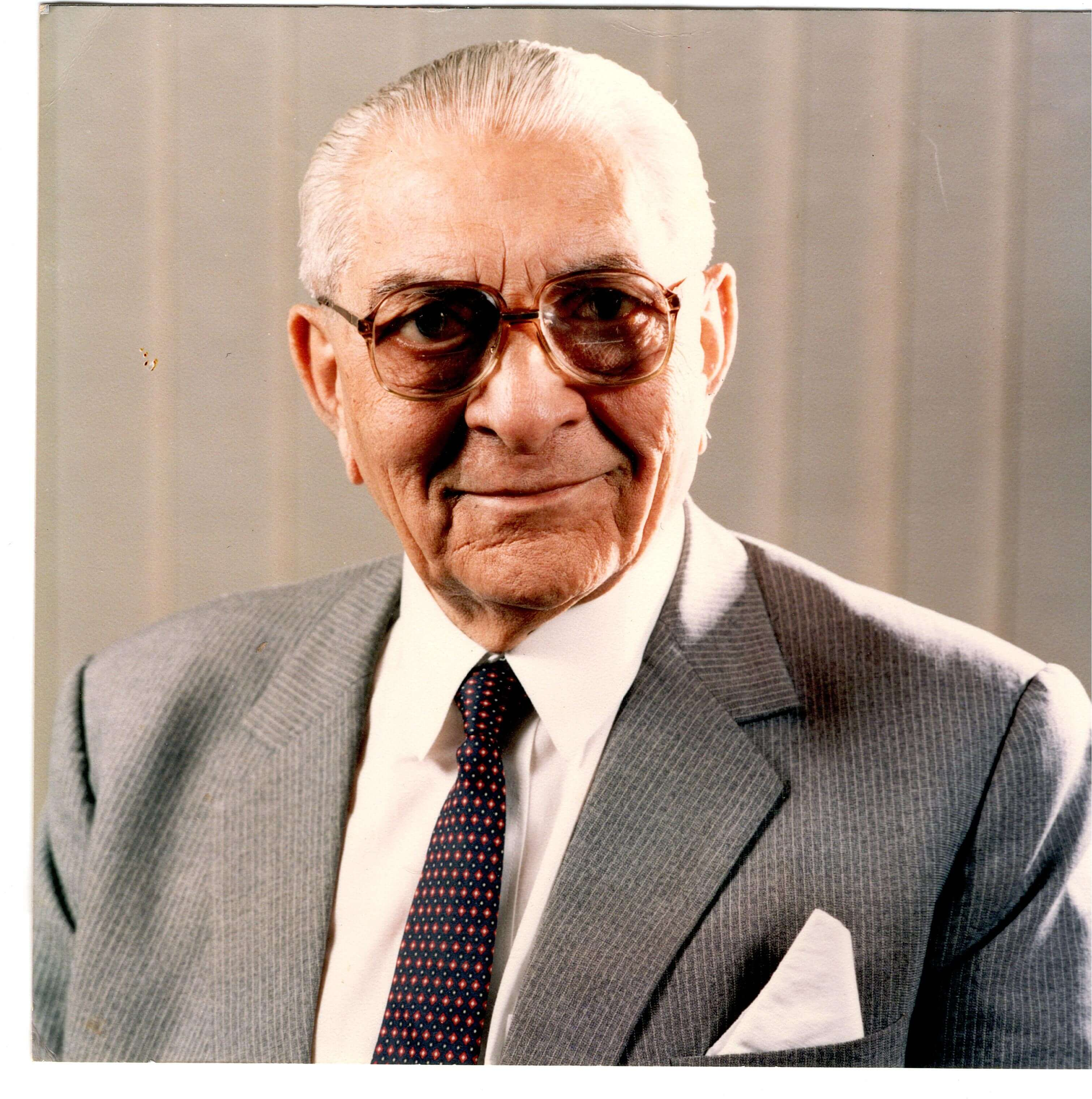
- Born: 15 March 1905; Bantva, Bantva Manavadar, British India
- Died: 2 January 2002 (aged 96); Karachi, Pakistan
- Resting place: Mewa Shah Graveyard; 24.358°N 67.038°E
- Years active: 1920–2002
- Known for: Patriarch of the Dawood Group leading Pakistani Businessman in the 1950-60s Founder of The Dawood Foundation (TDF)
- Title: Chairman
- Term: 1947–2002
- Successor: Hussain Dawood
- Spouses: Aysha (m. 1923; died 1933) Mariam Bai (m. 1940)
- Children: 5, including Hussain
- Relatives: Abdul Razak Dawood (nephew)
- Awards: Hilal-e-Khidmat (1962); Baba-e-Ittehad (1986)

Ahmed Dawood (15 March 1905 – 2 January 2002) was a Pakistani industrialist and philanthropist. Dawood founded several companies and The Dawood Foundation (TDF), which established the Dawood College of Engineering and Technology (renamed Dawood University of Engineering & Technology after being granted the status of a university in 2013).

== Early life ==
Ahmed was born in Bantva, a small town in Kathiawar, British India, as the eldest son and second child of the seven children to Dawood Gandhi and Hajiani Hanifa Bai, a Memon trader family. He had three years of formal education, like many others in his time and environs. He followed the family tradition and went into the family business.

When he was 12, he was sent to stay with his maternal grandfather, Haji Abdul Ghani, son of Haji Noor Muhammad, in south India. Over two years, he learned basic trade of cotton yarn, wheat, and grains in Shimoga (then in Mysore state, now in Karnataka). He was then sent for another two years to the Madras Presidency area and assigned more responsibilities. The death of his father, Dawood, was a turning point in his life. Ahmed moved to Bombay and started his own business barely at the age of 15. Under the supervision of his grandfather, he opened a shop in Hanuman Building in the Tamba Kanta market area of Bombay.

When he was 18 or 19 years old, Ahmed was married to Ayesha Bai, a girl of his own community and similar family background, in a match arranged by their families in the usual Indian way. The couple had two sons – Aziz Dawood and Yusuf Dawood — and one daughter, Khadijah (Khatoo Bai). After around 10 years, his wife Ayesha Bai died as a result of tuberculosis. Some years later, Ahmed Dawood married Mariam Bai, another lady from his own community and similar family background, again in a match arranged by their families. The couple had two children, son Hussain Dawood and daughter Amina Bai.

== Professional life in Bombay ==
Dawood's initial ventures in the spice trade ended in bankruptcy. He then opened a small shop in Tamba Kanta to deal in cotton and silk yarn. His strategy involved purchasing wholesale and selling retail. By 1933 he was with his firm, the biggest supplier of imported yarn to the textile mills in British India. He also set up a cotton ginning factory in his hometown of Bantva, an oil mill in Madras, and a Vanaspati (hydrogenated vegetable oil) factory in Calcutta. With a special license granted by the British colonial government, Dawood set up an army vehicle disposable depot in Chattogram. Such depots were established after the end of the first World War and required a license.

Dawood further acquired an automobile service and repair company which carried out operations on a large scale. Altogether, Dawood had some 26 shops and offices across British India. He was about to finalise a deal with one of the leading traders and industrialists of the time, Nagindas Fulchand Chinai, to establish a viscose manufacturing joint venture when India got partitioned. Dawood left India and moved with his siblings and their entire families to Pakistan soon after its founding with personal belongings they could carry.

== Professional life in Pakistan ==
Dawood and his three brothers — Suleman Dawood, Siddique Dawood, and Sattar Dawood — started new business activities as Dawood Cooperation Ltd. with an office in Karachi's old business area New Chali and soon after opened a shop on Saleh Muhammad Street (adjacent to Bandar Road) for trading textile and yarn. Therefore, the Dawood Cooperation was established in Pakistan and in Manchester.

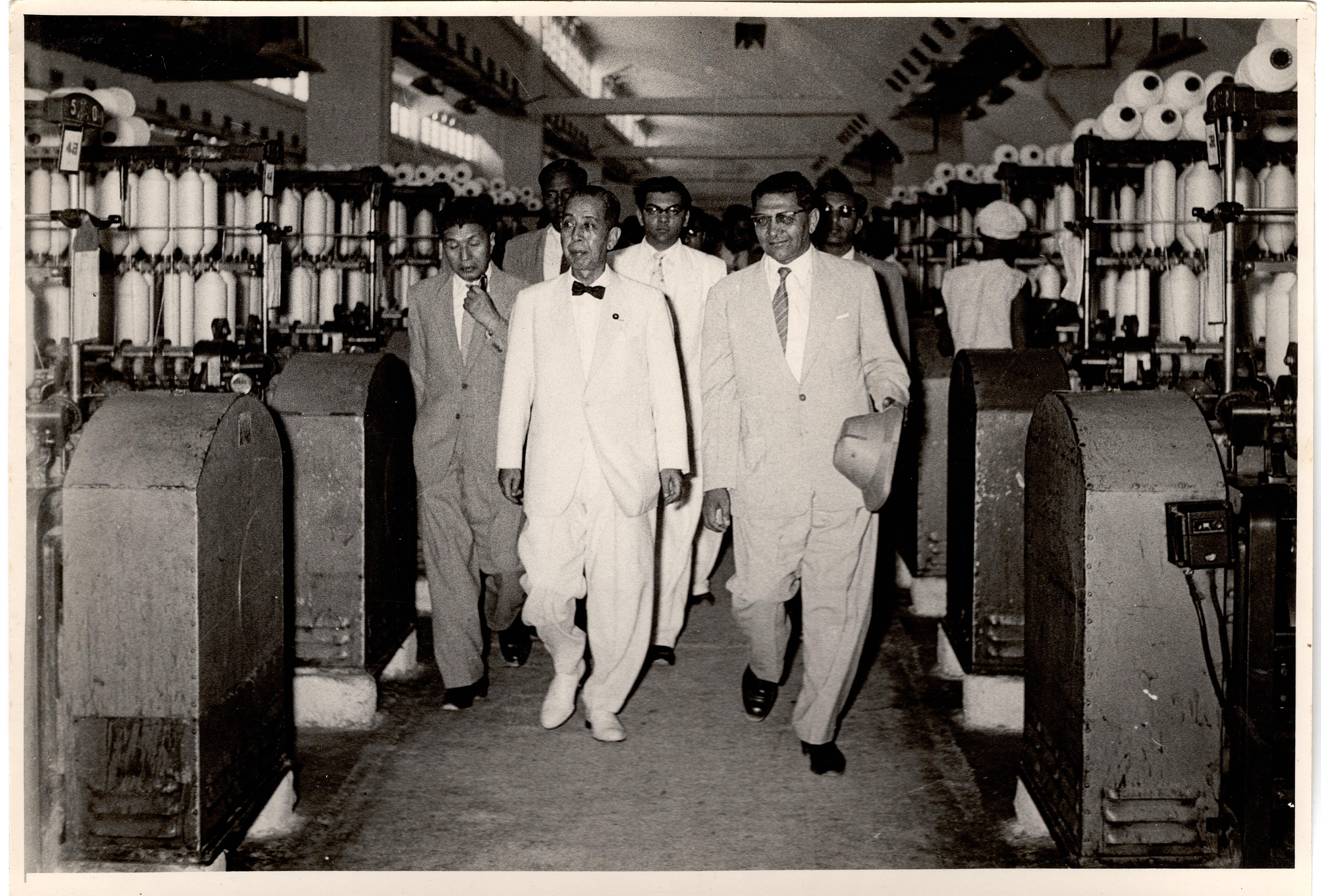
Dawood and Japanese Prime Minister Nobusuke Kishi at the Dawood Cotton Mills in Karachi during the latter's 1957 visit to Pakistan

In the following decades, particular in the 1950s and 1960s, Dawood founded several businesses and chaired companies in the cotton, textiles, paper, consumer goods, oil, logistics, insurance, jute, chemicals, motorbikes, home appliances, electronics, and fertilisers industries in East and West Pakistan. He rose to prominence at the national level and became a major figure in the industrialisation of Karachi.

Dawood served as vice-chairman of Pakistan Industrial Credit and Investment Corporation (PICIC), one of the first development finance institutions in the country.

In 1968, Dawood partnered with the American company Hercules Inc. A private loan from the World Bank's International Finance Corporation (IFC) supported the realisation of the fertiliser factory in Sheikhpura. In 1969, the expansion of multiple projects peaked: Dawood Petroleum Ltd started construction of its Oil Terminal at Keamari. The Dawood Jute Mills were set up in East Pakistan, and the construction of the Dawood Hercules Chemical Fertilizer factory started. The IFC invested into the expansion of the Karnaphuli Paper Mills in East Pakistan. The project to assemble motorbikes in Pakistan known as Dawood Yamaha Ltd. started in the same year. At the peak of his economic ventures in 1970, the different entities Dawood chaired employed 35,000 people. It was also the year his mother died.

As a result of the independence of Bangladesh in 1971, assets and properties in East Pakistan of residents of West Pakistan were confiscated and nationalised. Dawood and his family lost factories in Dhaka and Chittagong — including Karnaphuli Paper Mills Limited, Karnaphuli Rayon and Chemical Limited, Dawood Jute Mills Limited and Dawood Shipping Company Limited — accounting for 60% of their industrial undertakings. All investments in the former eastern part of the country were lost. The pressure also increased for the remaining businesses in Pakistan and for Dawood. In January 1972 he and other industrialists were put under house arrest. The Government initiated nationalisation of many local private companies across the country. In the same year, the nationalisation process affected many industries including those of Dawood and his family. He lost two million rupees and profitable industrial projects, namely Dawood Petroleum Limited and Central Life Insurance Company Limited. Dawood Petroleum was put under martial law in 1972, and the oil business became in 1974 an official part of Pakistan State Oil (PSO). Dawood "was downsized to almost insignificance [but] he did not give up, he continued to develop things though at a much lesser scale".

Of the remaining businesses that Dawood chaired, Dawood Hercules Chemical Ltd. and their fertiliser factory in Sheikhupura near Lahore was a profitable joint venture. This, along with the Lawrencepur Woollen and Textile Mills Limited, Dawood Cotton Mills Limited, Burewala Textile Mills Limited, and Dilon Limited, was the backbone of Dawood's economic activities.

In 1975, disappointed with the nationalisation policy of the government, Dawood and his wife left Pakistan for the US. While abroad, he set up an oil exploration company that discovered oil wells in Texas. He then returned to Pakistan in 1977.

By the late 1970s and early 80s, although the corporation was doing well financially, Dawood's siblings parted ways with him.

In 1990, Dawood bought the stake of the American partner of the joint venture and as Chairman, acquired all of Hercules' stakes.

== Social and welfare services ==
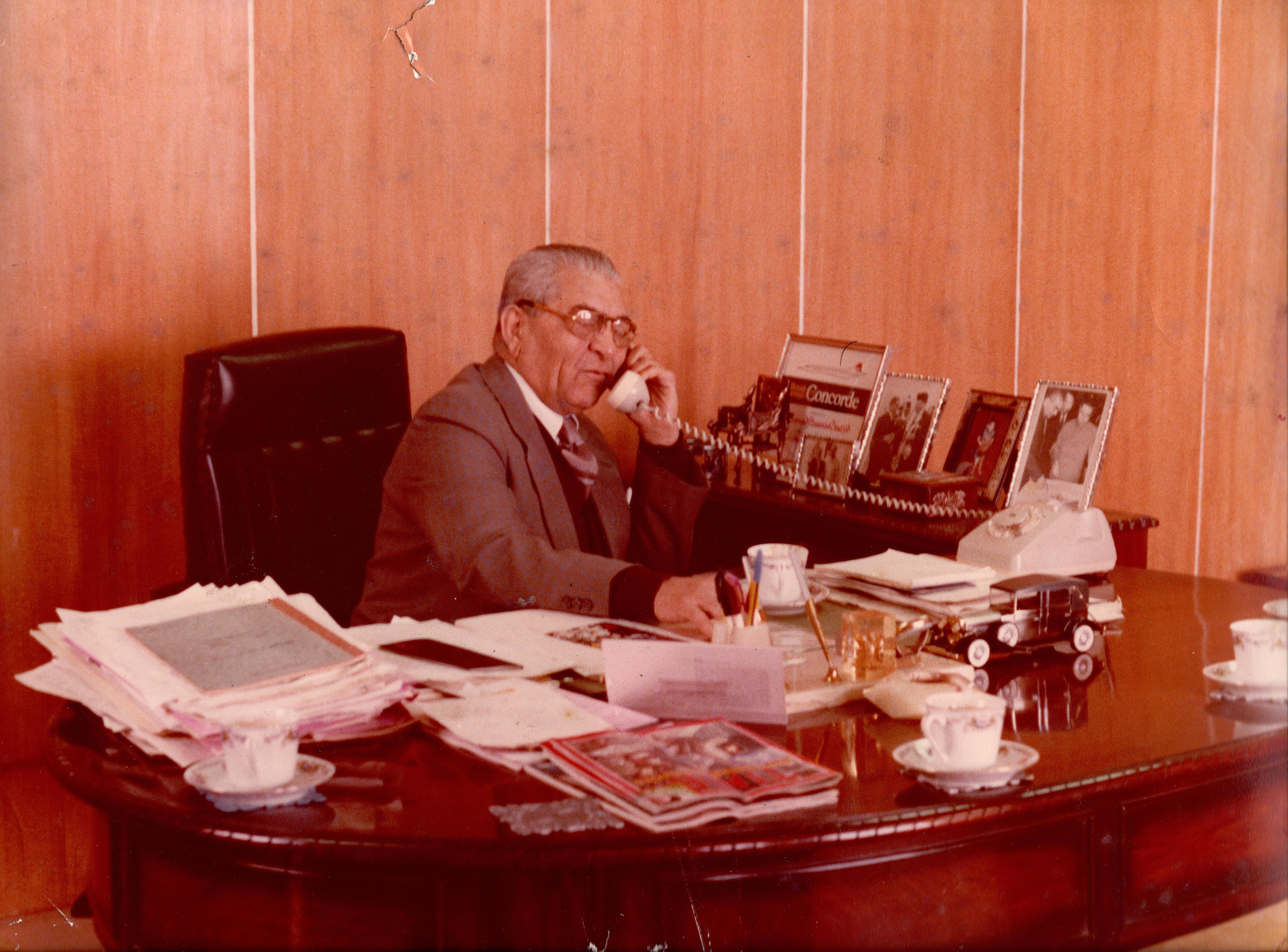
Dawood at work in the late 1980s

Dawood focused his philanthropic activities on health and education. In 1950, he created the Dawood Trust to provide scholarships and financial help for students and educational institutions. He transformed the Trust into an educational Foundation, which became The Dawood Foundation (TDF) in February 1960. In 1962 TDF founded the Dawood College of Engineering and Technology in Karachi, which became nationalised in 1971.

In 1983, he founded the Dawood Public School in Karachi's Dawood Colony. Dawood's children and those from his extended family all went abroad to the UK for schooling and to prestigious universities in the UK and the US.

TDF was involved in the construction and administration of various schools, colleges, and madrassas. It also offered stipends and scholarships to students for higher education.

Dawood and his family have also been involved in the construction of Masjid-e-Quba in Karachi's Dawood Colony. He has also been engaged in welfare of the Memon community. In 1981, he was involved in the creation of a united platform for Memons. The United Memon Jamat of Pakistan (UMJP) was formed to create a joint organisation of Halai, Kutchi and Sindhi Memons.

Dawood died 2 January 2002 in Karachi at the age of 96. Dawood is buried in the grounds of the Mewa Shah Graveyard of Karachi.

In 2003, Lahore University of Management Sciences (LUMS) established the Ahmed Dawood Chair at the SBA School of Science and Engineering Dean in his honor.

== Sources ==
- Batliwala, Usman Umar (1995), احمد داؤد - ایک پیکرِ اوصاف (Ahmad Dawood - a figure of merit) (in Urdu) (1 ed.), Karachi: Faran Publications
- TDF (20 April 1961). "Brochure in Commemoration of the Inauguration of the Dawood Foundation" (PDF). The Dawood Foundation. 1 (1): 33.
