= Hussain Dawood Pledge =

Private donation and initiative to fight against the COVID-19 pandemic in Pakistan

The Hussain Dawood Pledge (HD-Pledge) was an initiative by Hussain Dawood and his family to fight against the COVID-19 pandemic in Pakistan. It was pledged on 2 April 2020 with a contribution in services, kind, and cash of Pakistani rupee (PKR) 1 billion (~6 million USD).

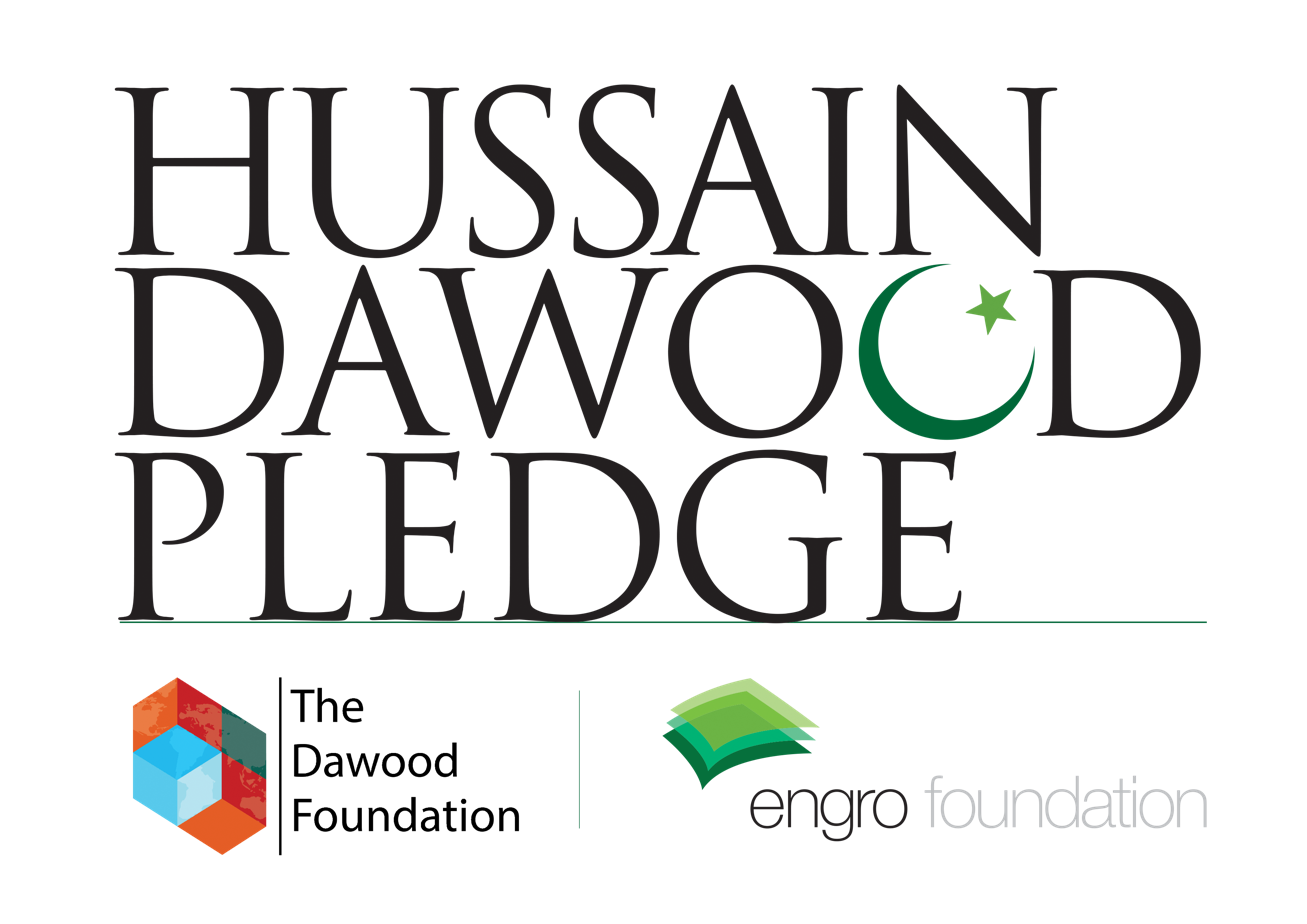
Logo of the Hussain Dawood Pledge

== History ==
The HD-Pledge was started as an initiative to support various organisations active in the healthcare system and to support measures against the spread of COVID-19 to reduce the impact.

With the publication of the pledge, it was announced that the four key areas are:

- Disease prevention, with a major focus on testing and diagnostics.
- Protecting and enabling healthcare practitioners and other key workers, who are at the frontline of the fight against this pandemic.
- Enabling patient care and facilities; and
- Bolster livelihoods and sustenance of the most deserving in society.

The HD-Pledge funds were disbursed primarily through The Dawood Foundation and Engro Foundation. The pledge management, a dedicated committee composed of leadership figures of Mr. Dawood's business enterprises and associated philanthropic foundations headed by Sabrina Dawood, developed the overarching strategy and is assessing applications for funds according to the criteria of sustainable impact and saving lives.

== Disbursements ==
Some selected examples of how this amount was donated:

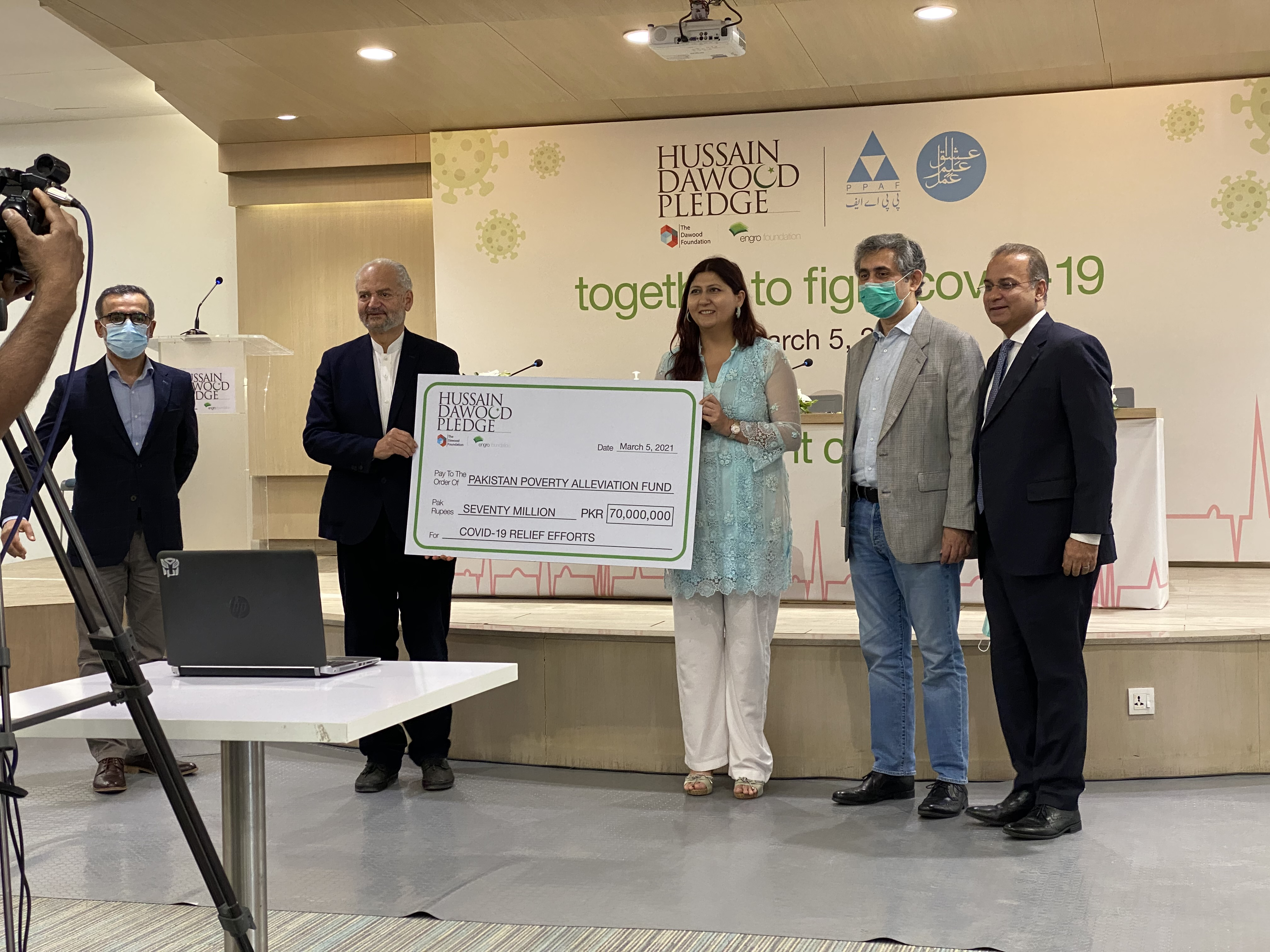
Handing over a symbolic cheque in Karachi from the Hussain Dawood Pledge to the CEO of the Pakistan Poverty Alleviation Fund during MoU signing ceremony, the lead implementing agency for the Ehsaas Amdan program

- PKR 28 million contribution to the Patients' Aid Foundation for the procurement of 14,000 medical grade scrubs to protect medical staff against the rising incidence of COVID-19 in Karachi.
- PKR 70 million contribution to the Ehsaas Amdan Program focused on smallholder farmers in the livestock sector in collaboration with the Pakistan Poverty Alleviation Fund (PPAF) as the implementing partner.
- PKR 20 million in financial assistance to Shaukat Khanum Memorial Cancer Hospital & Research Centre to expand COVID-19 testing capacity across Southern Punjab and strengthen the health sector to cope with the ongoing pandemic (April 2020).
- PKR 40 million to extend the partnership with Shaukat Khanum Memorial Cancer Hospital and Research Centre for expansion of COVID-19 testing capacity in Southern Punjab (June 2020).
- PKR 79.5 million contribution to a collaborative project with Aga Khan University to build the capacity of frontline healthcare professionals to manage COVID-19 patients across the country.
- PKR 18.7 million for the establishment of a High Dependency Unit (HDU) at the Indus Hospital, Karachi, to enhance COVID-19 patient care and facilities.
- PKR 12 million committed to establish an Intensive Care Unit (ICU) at Nishtar Medical University & Hospital, Multan. This included the set up and operationalisation of a 20-bed dedicated HDU with medical equipment.
- 459,000 units of personal protective equipment (PPE) worth Rs100 million for front-line healthcare practitioners treating COVID-19 patients.
- Support Sehat Kahani by adding 100 more doctors to the telemedicine app to facilitate a greater number of virtual consultations.
- PKR 95 million to the Indus Hospital to expand the COVID-19 testing capacity across Sindh under the Sindh Screening Programme — Free of Cost.
- PKR 7,9 million to promote mental health-support among frontline workers and the general population directly affected by COVID-19 pandemic together with the British Asian Trust and IRD Pakistan.
