= Karachi School of Business & Leadership =

University in Karachi, Pakistan

Karachi School of Business and Leadership
- دانشگاه تجارت و قیادت کراچی
- Type: Private
- Established: 2010
- Endowment: Karachi Education Initiative
- Chairman: Hussain Dawood
- Rector: Asghar Zaidi
- Dean: Ahmad Junaid
- Location: Karachi, Sindh, Pakistan
- Campus: Urban
- Website: www.ksbl.edu.pk

The Karachi School of Business and Leadership (KSBL) is an independent graduate business school located in Karachi, Sindh, Pakistan. Established through a strategic collaboration between Karachi Education Initiative (KEI) and the Cambridge Judge Business School, the school was established in 2009.

== History ==
Cambridge Judge acts as the school's strategic partner, and was tasked to establish faculty recruitment, faculty planning and development, designing of curriculum. The school was awarded university charter in December 2012 by Sindh Government. As of 2021, the enrollment in different graduate program was over 150. The executive education classes, that were launched in May 2010 are taught by teachers from Cambridge University.

== Campus ==
KSBL operates out of a purpose-built campus, designed by William McDonough Partners and was inaugurated in 2013.

In December 2018, the Engro Leadership Academy (ELA) was inaugurated at the KSBL. Conceived as a strategic initiative, ELA aims to cultivate and empower the next generation of leadership in Pakistan.
