= Magnifi-Science Exhibition =

Annual science exhibit in Karachi, Pakistan

The Dawood Foundation Magnifi-Science Exhibition
- Genre: Technology Science Earth Science
- Venue: Dawood Public School
- Location: Karachi, Pakistan
- Inaugurated: 23–25 September 2016
- Attendance: 50,000
- Organizer: The Dawood Foundation (TDF)
- Website: dawoodfoundation.org

The Dawood Foundation Magnifi-Science Exhibition is a yearly science exhibition that aims to promote the culture of science and informal learning through exhibits, experiments and expositions. The exhibition takes place in Karachi, Pakistan. Around 20,000 student from 55 schools participated on the first day. Chief Minister Murad Ali Shah and Education Minister Jam Mehtab Hussain Dahar also attended the exhibition. Some scientific research groups participated in this exhibition. The main focus of the exhibition is to encourage young children to get involved with scientific studies and activities.

== Gallery ==
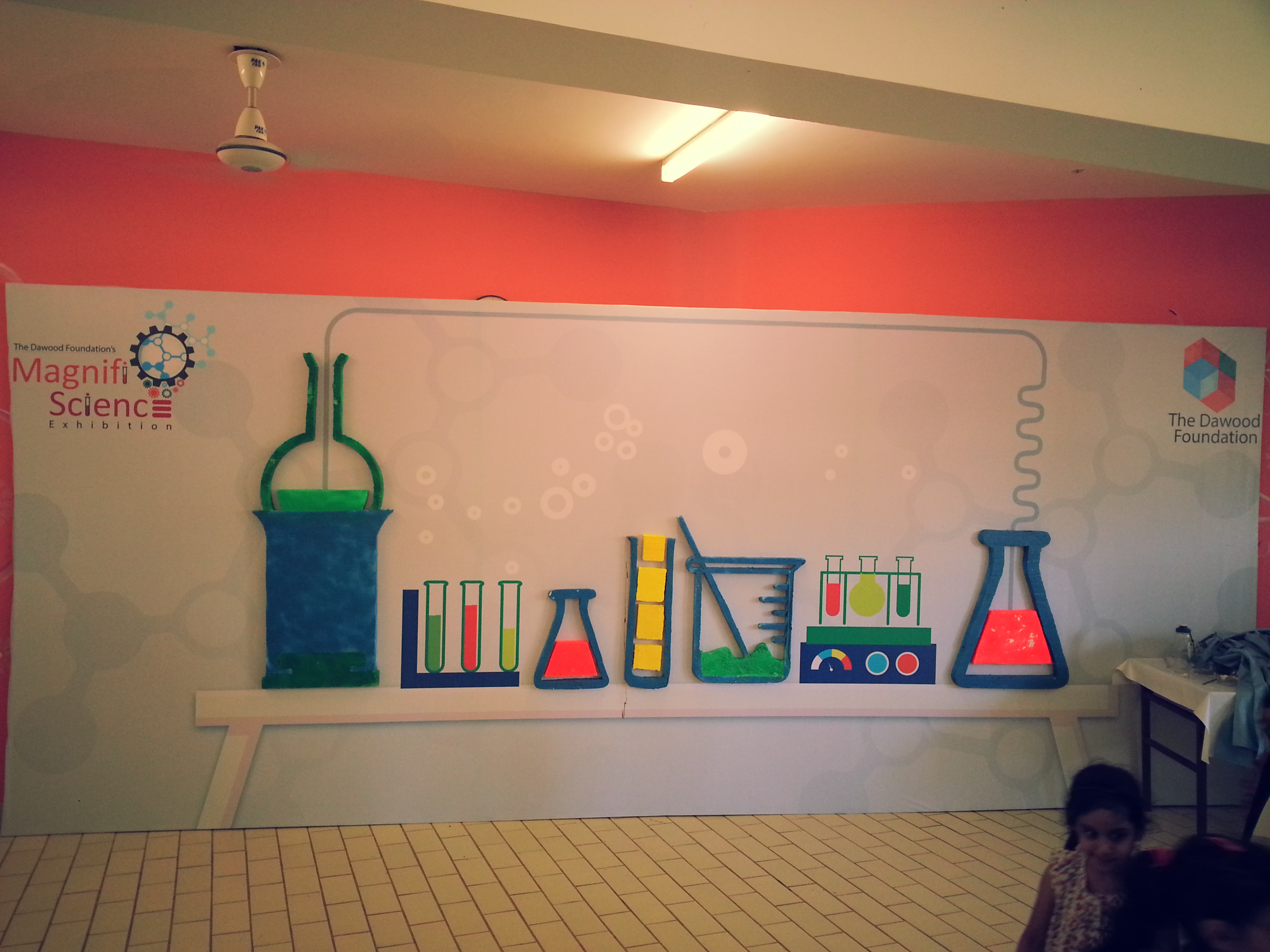
Magni-Science Poster Picture

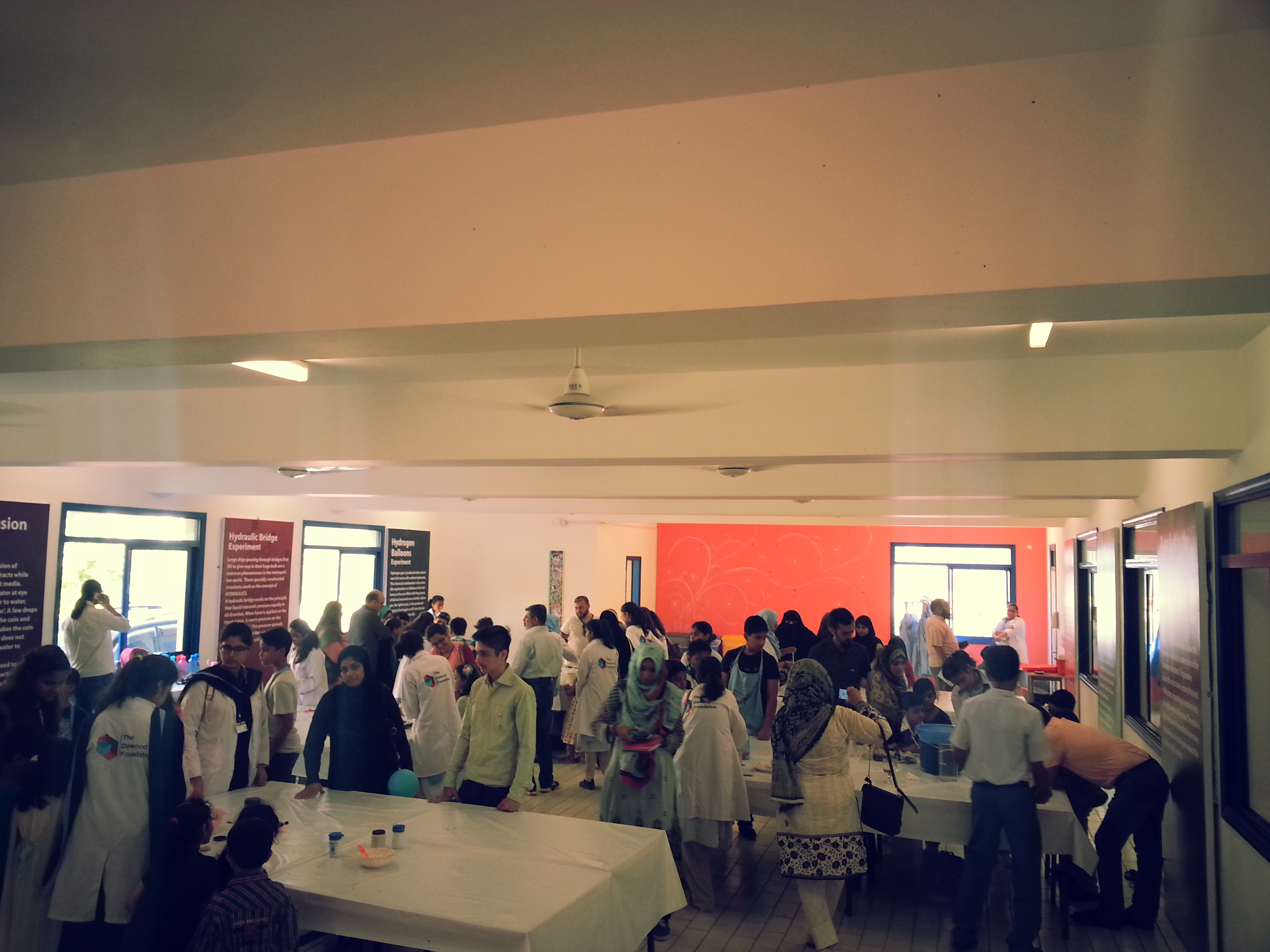
Magni-Science Audience in Exhibit 1

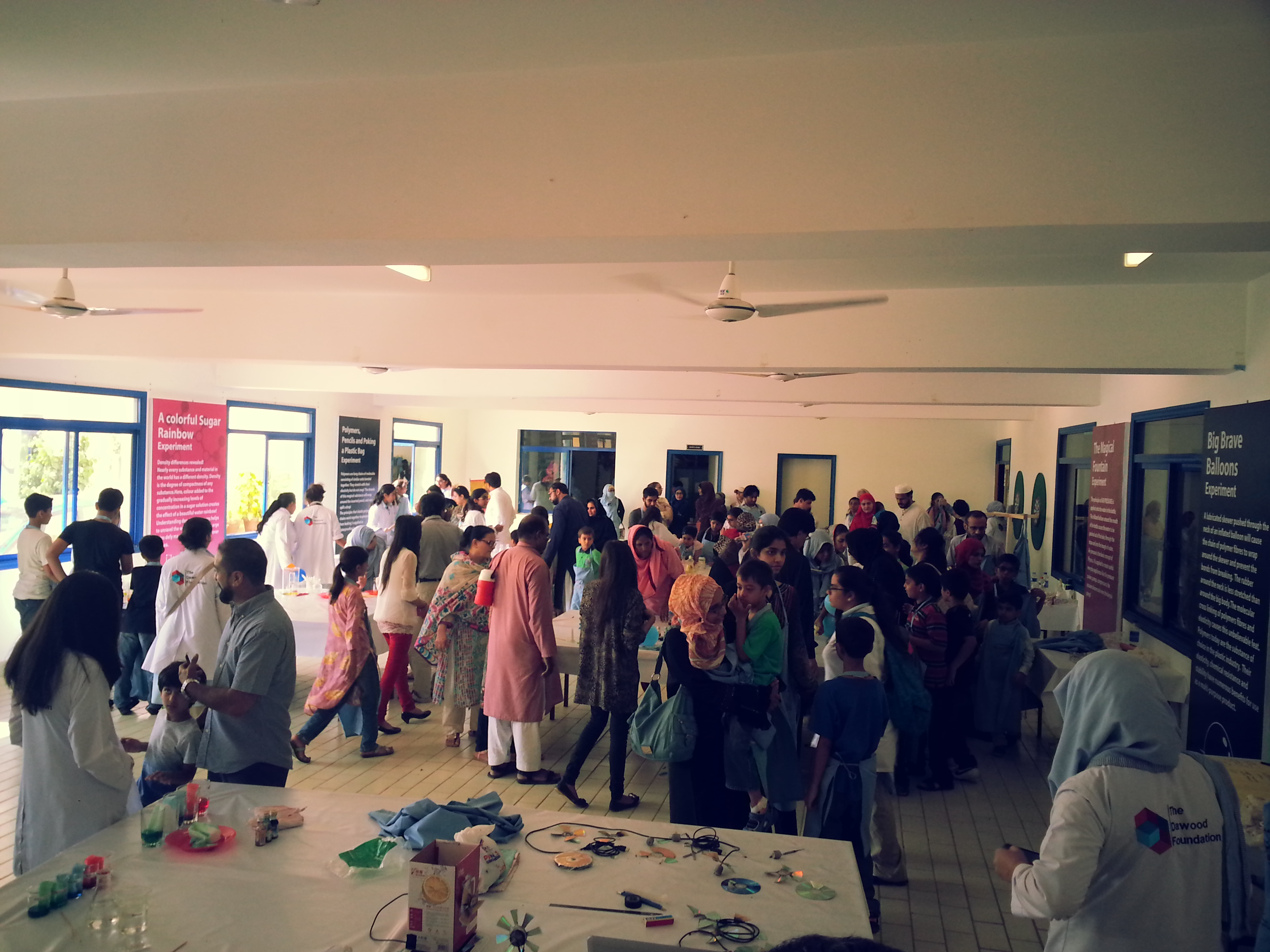
Magni-Science Audience in Exhibit 2
