= Jay Bloom =

American businessman and financier

- Born: Jay Lawrence Bloom; 1967 (age 58–59); Tachikawa, Air Force Base, Japan
- Education: Fordham University
- Occupations: Financier; Real estate developer
- Spouse: Carolyn Farkas
- Children: 1
- Website: jaybloom.com

Jay Bloom (born 1967) is an American investor, real estate developer, and entrepreneur based in Las Vegas, Nevada.

== Early life and education ==
Bloom was born in Tachikawa, Japan, on a US Air Force base where his father was serving. He was raised Jewish. He has an MBA from Fordham University.

== Career ==
While still in college, he started Magnavest, an investment company that covered call option writing. After graduation, he worked for ten years at Manufacturers Hanover Trust in New York City.

In 1996, he and his wife also founded a veterinary discount company, Pet Assure. After selling the company, he retired at 33, but became interested in flying helicopters. He earned a private helicopter pilot's license and bought his own helicopter.

In Las Vegas, Bloom heads a number of real estate investment and development companies. He is chairman of First 100 LLC, which buys and forecloses on home owners association liens. He co-founded and is executive chairman of Pegasus Group Holdings, which develops and operates data centers that use renewable energy.

== Controversies ==
Bloom was managing partner of the Mob Experience, a Mafia-themed attraction that opened in 2011 at the Tropicana casino on the Las Vegas Strip. Jay Bloom's partner, Louis Ventre, filed for Chapter 11 bankruptcy for the Las Vegas Mob Experience, 4 months after its opening, listing limited liquid assets and approximately $7 million in debt

In 2018, he co-founded Police Chase Las Vegas, which offers participation in a simulated police chase at the Las Vegas Motor Speedway.

In 2021, Jay Bloom announced plans to lead a bid for a National Basketball Association expansion team in Las Vegas, stating he could invest $300 million to $500 million.

== Personal life ==
Bloom is married to Carolyn Farkas.

In 2022 and 2023, OceanGate CEO Stockton Rush invited him and his son to visit the wreck of the Titanic aboard the company's submersible Titan. Bloom declined, following safety concerns. On that dive, the submarine catastrophically imploded, killing Rush and four others.
