= Saint Francis High School (Mountain View, California) =

Location
- 1885 Miramonte Avenue; Mountain View, California 94040; United States; 37°22′11″N 122°05′05″W

Information
- Type: Private
- Motto: A HOLY CROSS HIGH SCHOOL
- Religious affiliation: Catholic (Brothers of Holy Cross)
- Patron saint: Saint Francis of Assisi
- Established: September 12, 1955
- Founders: The Brothers of Holy Cross
- Authority: Congregation of Holy Cross (Southwest Province)
- Oversight: Diocese of San Jose
- CEEB code: 052-077
- NCES School ID: 01609203
- President: Jason D. Curtis
- Principal: Katie Teekell
- Teaching staff: 100.6 (on an FTE basis)
- Grades: 9-12
- Gender: Coeducational
- Enrollment: 1,790 (2025-2026)
- Student to teacher ratio: 17.2
- Campus: Suburban
- Colors: Brown; Gold; White
- Athletics conference: CIF Central Coast Section (West Catholic Athletic League)
- Nickname: Lancers
- Rival: Bellarmine College Preparatory
- Accreditation: Western Association of Schools and Colleges
- Publication: Mindframes (literary magazine)
- Newspaper: The Lancer
- Yearbook: Poverello
- Tuition: $30,500 (2026-2027)
- Website: www.sfhs.com

Saint Francis High School, founded in 1955 by the Brothers of Holy Cross, is a Catholic, co-educational, college preparatory secondary school located in Mountain View, California, United States. The Brothers of Holy Cross serve both on the faculty and on the Board of Directors. The school is located in the Diocese of San Jose in California.

== History ==
The Brothers of Holy Cross opened Saint Francis High School as an all-boys school in September 1955. The original teaching facility was a small frame building, renovated from a grammar school and named Grant Hall after Harry Grant, the first student to enroll. Other buildings included a former residence, Andre House, and some peripheral structures. The grounds were largely orchards. Four Brothers comprised the first-year faculty. The first principal was Brother Donatus Schmitz. He was soon replaced by Brother Fisher Iwasko, who remained several years and is considered the principal founder.

Soon afterwards, the Brothers of Holy Cross invested $210,000 of their own funds and $225,000 of borrowed funds to build Holy Cross Hall. The building contained eight classrooms, three science laboratories, and administrative offices, and was completed in December 1956.

In 1959, Raskob Memorial Gymnasium was built on land donated by Ira and Elise Higgins. By 1962, the student body had grown to 685. In 1972, Saint Francis merged with Holy Cross High School, necessitating additional facilities.

In 2012, the school made a $15,000 investment into the tech company Snap Inc.; it had taken money from the endowment fund. This investment grew to $24 million by 2017.

In 2024, the school was sued by two students who were expelled after taking photos of themselves wearing face masks, perceived to be blackface. The jury returned a split verdict on charges, but the school was ordered to pay $500,000 to each of the two students and to reimburse $70,000 in tuition fees. The Free Press, founded by Bari Weiss, published an in-depth feature by investigative journalist Frannie Block in July 2025, detailing the accusations and lasting impact on one of the former students and his family.

== Academics ==
As a Catholic college preparatory school, Saint Francis requires coursework in English, mathematics, social studies, science, modern language, fine arts, physical education, and religious studies. Saint Francis also provides honors and Advanced Placement program, offering students over 33 AP courses and honors courses.

== Notable alumni ==
- Troy Bienemann, former NFL player
- Zack Walz, former NFL player
- Eric Byrnes, former MLB player
- Linda Cardellini, actress
- Doug Cosbie, former NFL player
- Daniel Descalso, former MLB player
- Pat Dillingham, former college football quarterback
- Rhett Ellison, former NFL player
- Viliami Fehoko, NFL player
- Gryffin, DJ
- Bob Hamm, former NFL player
- Mike Hibler, former NFL player
- Tyler Johnson, NBA player
- Chase Lyman, former NFL player
- Grant Mattos, former NFL player
- K. Megan McArthur, astronaut and oceanographer
- Joseph McGee, US Army General
- Daniel Nava, former MLB player
- Tony O'Dell, Actor
- Delaney Baie Pridham, soccer player
- Tim Rossovich, former NFL player
- Guillermo Söhnlein, co-founder of submersibles manufacturer, OceanGate
- Will Ta'ufo'ou, former NFL player
- Evan Williams, NFL player

== Athletics ==
Saint Francis is well-known for its strong athletic programs. Most of the student-athletes play in the West Catholic Athletic League part of the CIF Central Coast Section a subset of the California Interscholastic Federation. As of August 2018, the school has accumulated 32 CIF-NorCal championships. Saint Francis was named 2021-22 State School of the Year by Cal-High Sports.

The following sports are offered at Saint Francis:

- Baseball
- Basketball
- Cross country
- Field hockey
- Football
- Golf
- Gymnastics
- Lacrosse
- Rugby
- Soccer
- Softball
- Swimming & diving
- Tennis
- Track and field
- Volleyball
- Water polo
- Wrestling
