= Ralph K. Davies =

American businessman (1897–1971)

Deputy Petroleum Administrator
- In office 1942–1946
- President: Franklin Delano Roosevelt; Harry S. Truman
- Preceded by: Vacant
- Succeeded by: Office abolished

Personal details
- Born: September 7, 1897 Cherrydale, Virginia, U.S.
- Died: September 19, 1971 (aged 74) San Francisco, California, U.S.
- Spouse: Louise Davies
- Children: 3
- Relatives: Stockton Rush (grandson)

Ralph K. Davies (September 9, 1897 – September 19, 1971) was an American businessman and political appointee. He began his career in oil and later moved into shipping. He was married to Louise Davies.

== Early life ==
Davies was a native of Cherrydale, Virginia, a neighborhood in Arlington, but moved at a young age to San Francisco, California. At 15 he became an office boy.

== Career ==
=== Oil ===
He was a director of Standard Oil Company of California in the 1920s–30s. He was the youngest person to become a director in Standard Oil's history. At 33, he became vice president of Standard Oil. After World War II he established American Independent Oil Company, a consortium of US independent oil companies better known as Aminoil, to engage on exploration and production offshore.

J. Howard Marshall, another highly successful oil man of that generation, who worked with Davies at Standard Oil of California and who was Chief Counsel at the Petroleum Administration for War (see Politics below), regarded Davies as one of the best oil executives of his generation, "certainly the best I ever met." Davies was one of two people to whom Marshall dedicated his autobiography (published over 20 years after Davies's death).

=== Shipping ===
From 1946 until 1971, when he died, he was chairman of the shipping company American President Lines (APL). In 1952, Davies, backed by Signal Oil and Gas founder Samuel B. Mosher (who also backed Aminoil), successfully won a bidding process to privatize APL. Under his leadership, the company went from almost bankrupt to a shipping empire. During his term at American President Lines, he became a millionaire.

=== Politics ===
Under Franklin Delano Roosevelt he served as Deputy Petroleum Administrator of the Petroleum Administration for War, in the Department of the Interior, Davies reported directly to Harold Ickes, and sometimes President Roosevelt. He served in this post from 1942 to 1946, though the administration was inactive for the final year of his term. Davies was designated as Deputy Administrator in 1941 but did not take office until the following year. He was awarded with a medal of merit by Harry S. Truman.

== Philanthropy ==
Ralph Davies Medical Center was founded and named after him. It closed in the 1980s. The medical center was involved in a 1975 court case. His wife Louise was the patron of the Louise M. Davies Symphony Hall.

== Personal life ==
He was married to Louise Davies. The couple had three daughters Ellen Rush, Maryon Davies Lewis and Alice Davies. Ellen Davies went on to marry Stockton Rush Jr., a descendant of Benjamin Rush. The couple had a son, Stockton Rush III who died in the Titan submersible implosion. Davies died in 1971 in San Francisco. He was 74.
