= Titan submersible implosion =

2023 maritime disaster

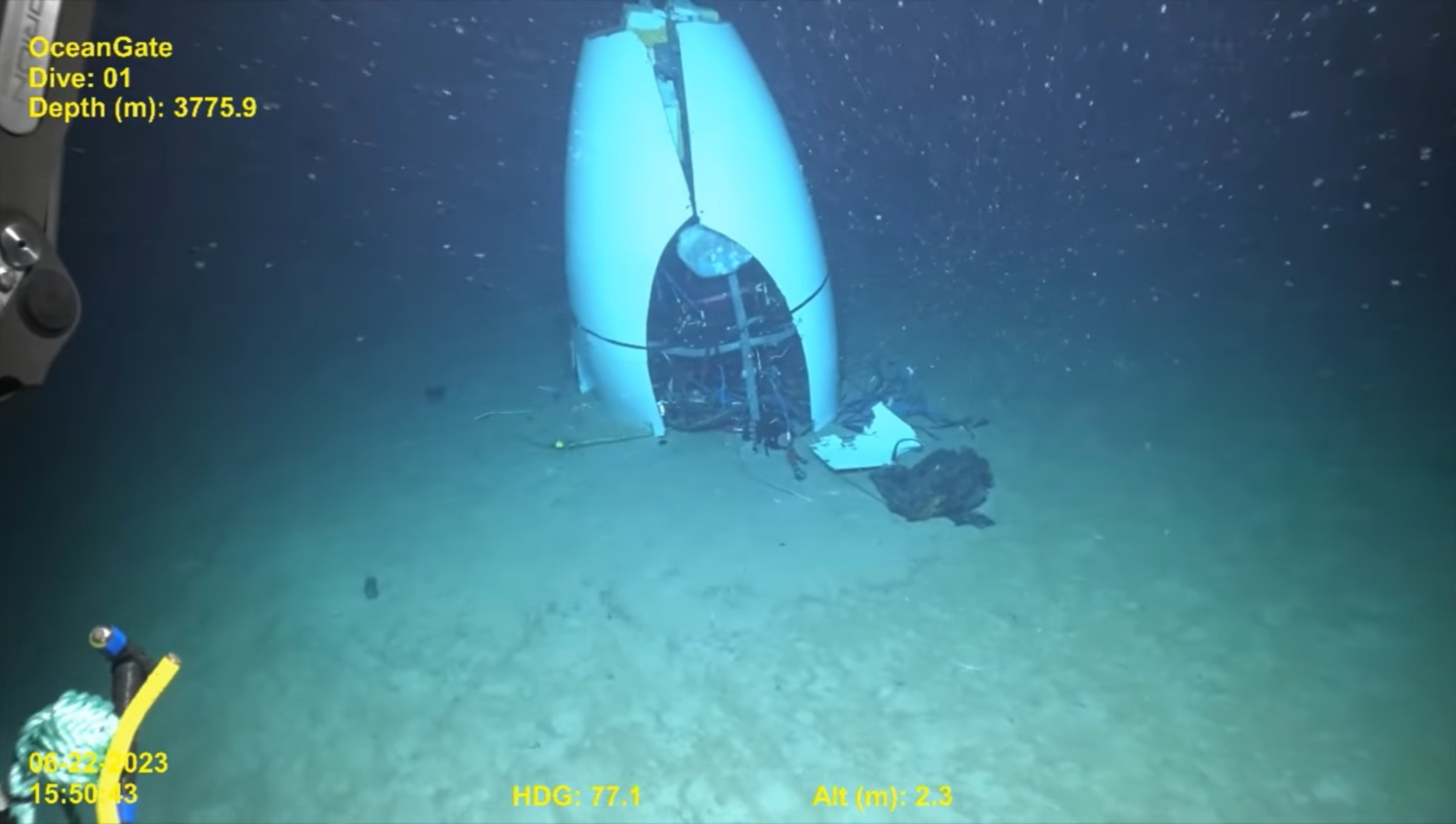
- Wreckage of Titan on the ocean floor, June 22, 2023
- Date: June 18, 2023 (3 years ago)
- Time: c. 10:47 a.m. NDT (13:17 UTC)
- Location: North Atlantic Ocean, near the wreck of the Titanic; 41.7344°N 49.9424°W
- Type: Maritime incident
- Cause: Failure of the composite pressure hull and negligence
- Organized by: OceanGate
- Participants: 5
- Outcome: Submersible destroyed by implosion
- Deaths: 5 (see Fatalities)
- Inquiries: Investigation by: United States; USCG Marine Board of Investigation – final report released August 2025; NTSB – final report released October 2025; Canada; TSB – final report released June 2026; Other participating agencies; RCMP (Canada); BEAmer (France)

On June 18, 2023, Titan, a submersible operated by the American tourism and expeditions company OceanGate, imploded during an expedition to view the wreck of the Titanic in the North Atlantic Ocean off the coast of Newfoundland, Canada. Aboard the submersible were Stockton Rush, the American chief executive officer of OceanGate; Paul-Henri Nargeolet, a French deep-sea explorer and Titanic expert; Hamish Harding, a British businessman; Shahzada Dawood, a Pakistani-British businessman; and Dawood's son, Suleman.

Communication between Titan and its mother ship, MV Polar Prince, was lost 1 hour and 33 minutes into the dive. Authorities were alerted when it failed to resurface at the scheduled time later that day. After the submersible had been missing for four days, a remotely operated underwater vehicle (ROV) discovered a debris field containing parts of Titan, about 550 yards (500 m; 1,650 ft) from the bow of Titanic. The search area was informed by the United States Navy's (USN) sonar detection of an acoustic signature consistent with an implosion around the time communications with the submersible ceased, suggesting the pressure hull had imploded while Titan was descending, resulting in the instant death of all five occupants.

The search and rescue operation was performed by an international team organized by the United States Coast Guard (USCG), USN, and Canadian Coast Guard. Support was provided by aircraft from the Royal Canadian Air Force and United States Air National Guard, a Royal Canadian Navy ship, as well as several commercial and research vessels and ROVs.

Industry experts, friends of Rush, and OceanGate employees had previously stated concerns about the safety of the vessel.

== Background ==
=== OceanGate ===
MV Polar Prince departed St. John's, Newfoundland (1), on June 16, 2023, and arrived at the dive site (2) on June 17, 2023, where Titan was deployed and began its descent the next day.

OceanGate, a private company, was initiated in 2009 by Stockton Rush and Guillermo Söhnlein. From 2010 until the loss of the Titan submersible, OceanGate had transported paying customers in leased commercial submersibles off the coast of California, in the Gulf of Mexico, and in the Atlantic Ocean. The company was based in Everett, Washington, US.

Rush realized that visiting shipwreck sites was a method of getting media attention. OceanGate had previously conducted voyages to other shipwrecks, including its 2016 dive to the wreck of Andrea Doria aboard their other submersible Cyclops 1. (A near disaster on that expedition was recounted in Vanity Fair in 2023.) In 2019, Rush told Smithsonian magazine: "There's only one wreck that everyone knows ... If you ask people to name something underwater, it's going to be sharks, whales, Titanic."

=== Titanic ===
The Titanic was a British ocean liner that sank in the North Atlantic Ocean on April 15, 1912, after colliding with an iceberg. More than 1,500 people died, making it the deadliest sinking of a single ship at the time. In 1985, Robert Ballard located the wreck of the Titanic 320 nautical miles (590 km; 370 mi) from the coast of Newfoundland. The Titanic's wreck lies at a depth of 2,100 fathoms (12,600 ft; 3,800 m). Since its discovery, it has been a destination for research expeditions and tourism. By 2012, 140 people had visited the wreck site.

== The Titan submersible ==
Schematics of the vessel

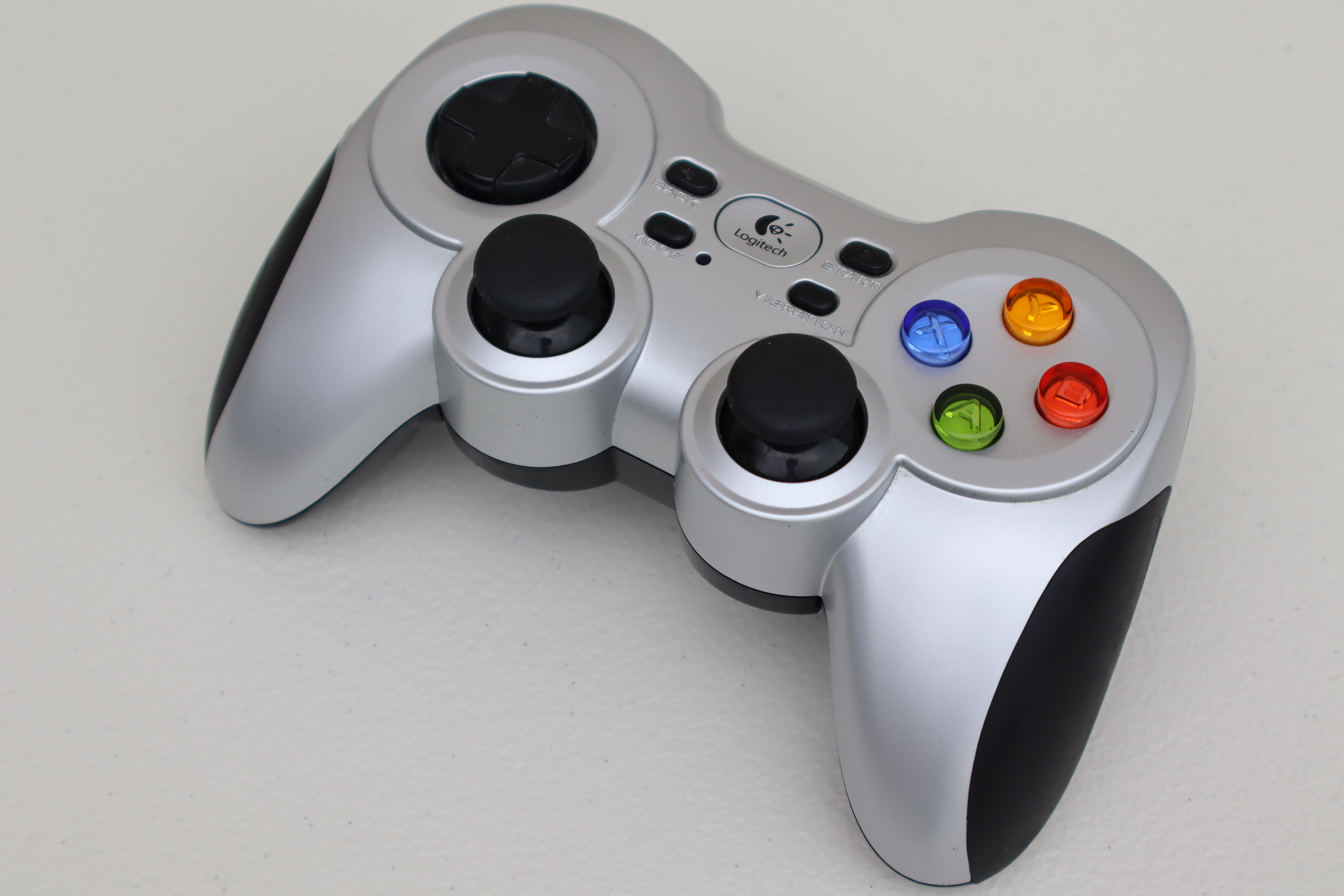
Logitech F710 similar to the one used (in modified form) on Titan for steering

Formerly known as Cyclops 2, Titan was a five-person submersible vessel operated by OceanGate Inc. The 6.7-metre (22 ft), 10,432-kilogram (10.4 t; 23,000 lb) vessel was constructed from carbon fibre and titanium. The entire pressure vessel consisted of two titanium hemispheres (domes) with matching titanium interface rings bonded to the 142-centimetre (56 in) internal diameter, 2.4-metre (7.9 ft) carbon fibre-wound cylinder. One of the titanium hemispherical end caps was detachable to provide the hatch and was fitted with a 380-millimetre-diameter (15 in) acrylic window. In 2020, Rush said that the hull, originally designed to reach 4,000 m (13,000 ft) below sea level, had been downgraded to a depth rating of 3,000 m (9,800 ft) after demonstrating signs of cyclic fatigue. In 2020 and 2021, the hull was repaired or rebuilt. Rush told the Travel Weekly editor-in-chief that the carbon fibre had been sourced at a discount from Boeing because it was too old for use in the company's airplanes. Boeing stated they have no records of any sale to Rush or to OceanGate. OceanGate had initially not sought certification for Titan, arguing that excessive safety protocols hindered innovation. Lloyd's Register, a ship classification society, refused OceanGate's request to class the vessel in 2019.

Titan could move at as much as 3 knots (5.6 km/h; 3.5 mph) using four electric thrusters, arrayed two horizontal and two vertical. Its steering controls consisted of a Logitech F710 wireless game controller with modified longer analog sticks resembling traditional joysticks. The University of Washington's Applied Physics Laboratory assisted with the control design on the Cyclops 1 using a DualShock 3 video game controller, which was carried over to Titan, substituting with the Logitech controller. The use of commercial off-the-shelf game controllers is common for remote-controlled vehicles such as unmanned aerial vehicles or bomb disposal robots, while the United States Navy uses Xbox 360 controllers to control periscopes in Virginia-class submarines.

OceanGate claimed on its website as of 2023 that Titan was "designed and engineered by OceanGate Inc. in collaboration [with] experts from NASA, Boeing, and the University of Washington" (UW). A 1/3-scale model of the Cyclops 2 pressure vessel was built and tested at the Applied Physics Laboratory (APL) at UW; the model was able to sustain a pressure of 291.6 standard atmospheres (29.54 MPa; 4,285 psi), corresponding to a depth of about 3,000 m (9,800 ft). After the disappearance of Titan in 2023, earlier associates disclaimed involvement with the Titan project. UW claimed the APL had no involvement in the "design, engineering, or testing of the Titan submersible". A Boeing spokesperson also claimed Boeing "was not a partner on Titan and did not design or build it". A NASA spokesperson said that NASA's Marshall Space Flight Center had a Space Act Agreement with OceanGate, but "did not conduct testing and manufacturing via its workforce or facilities".

It was designed and developed originally in partnership with UW and Boeing, both of which put forth numerous design recommendations and rigorous testing requirements, which Rush ignored, despite prior tests at lower depths resulting in implosions at the UW lab. These partnerships dissolved as Rush refused to work within quality standards.

According to OceanGate, the vessel contained monitoring systems to continuously monitor the strength of the hull. The vessel had life support for five people for 96 hours. GPS signals cannot be received underwater; instead, the support ship and Titan used an ultra-short baseline (USBL) acoustic positioning system to determine their relative distance and bearing. The same system could be used to send very short text messages between the two craft.

According to OceanGate, Titan had several backup systems intended to return the vessel to the surface in case of emergency, including ballasts that could be dropped, a balloon, thrusters, and sandbags held by hooks designed to dissolve after a certain number of hours in saltwater, releasing the sandbags and allowing the vessel to float to the surface. An OceanGate investor explained that if the vessel did not ascend automatically after the elapsed time, those inside could help release the ballast either by tilting the ship back and forth to dislodge it or by using a pneumatic pump to loosen the weights.

=== Dives to wreck of Titanic ===
Dives by Titan to the wreck of Titanic occurred as part of multi-day excursions organized by OceanGate, which the company referred to as "missions". Five missions per year occurred in the middle of 2021 and 2022. Titan imploded during the fifth mission of 2023; none of the four earlier that year got close to Titanic, largely because of rough weather. YouTuber Jake Koehler was invited to vlog the submersible's Mission III, which did not dive due to poor weather, a ghost net wrapping around and destroying some of the submersible's parts, and the motor controllers malfunctioning. Following the submersible's implosion, Koehler uploaded a YouTube video documenting his experience.

Passengers would sail to and from the wreckage site aboard a support ship and spend approximately five days on the ocean above the Titanic wreckage site. Two dives were usually attempted during each excursion, though dives were often cancelled or aborted due to weather or technical malfunctions.

Each dive typically had a pilot, a guide, and three paying passengers aboard. Once they were inside the submersible, the hatch would be bolted shut and could only be reopened from the outside. The descent from the surface to the Titanic wreck typically took two hours, with the full dive taking about eight hours. Throughout the journey, the submersible's acoustic positioning system sent automated location updates ("pings") to the surface team's tracking equipment every 5 to 10 seconds; the two vessels were also expected to send "comms check" text messages every 15 minutes.

Customers who travelled to the wreck with OceanGate, referred to as "mission specialists" by the company, paid US$250,000 each for the eight-day expedition.

=== Safety ===
Because Titan operated in international waters and did not carry passengers from a port, it was not subject to safety regulations. The vessel was not certified as seaworthy by any regulatory agency or third-party organization. Reporter David Pogue, who completed the expedition in 2022 as part of a CBS News Sunday Morning feature, said that all passengers who enter Titan sign a waiver confirming their knowledge that it is an "experimental" vessel "that has not been approved or certified by any regulatory body, and could result in physical injury, disability, emotional trauma or death". Television producer Mike Reiss, who also completed the expedition, said the waiver "mention[s] death three times on page one". A 2019 article published in Smithsonian magazine referred to Rush as a "daredevil inventor". In the article, Rush is described as having said that the US Passenger Vessel Safety Act of 1993 "needlessly prioritized passenger safety over commercial innovation". In a 2022 interview, Rush told CBS News, "At some point, safety just is pure waste. I mean, if you just want to be safe, don't get out of bed. Don't get in your car. Don't do anything." Rush said in a 2021 interview, "I've broken some rules to make [Titan]. I think I've broken them with logic and good engineering behind me. The carbon fibre and titanium, there's a rule you don't do that. Well, I did."

OceanGate claimed that Titan was the only crewed submersible that used an integrated real-time monitoring system (RTM) for safety. The proprietary system, patented by Rush in 2021, used acoustic sensors and strain gauges at the pressure boundary to analyse the effects of increasing pressure as the watercraft ventured deeper into the ocean and to monitor the hull's integrity in real time. This would supposedly give early warning of problems and allow enough time to abort the descent and return to the surface.

=== Prior concerns ===
In 2018, OceanGate's director of marine operations, David Lochridge, composed a report documenting safety concerns he had about Titan. In court documents, Lochridge said that he had urged the company to have Titan assessed and certified by the American Bureau of Shipping, but OceanGate had refused to do so, instead seeking classification from Lloyd's Register. He also said that the transparent viewport on its forward end, due to its nonstandard and therefore experimental design, was only certified to a depth of 1,300 m (4,300 ft), only a third of the depth required to reach the Titanic's wreck. According to Lochridge, RTM would "only show when a component is about to fail – often milliseconds before an implosion" and could not detect existing flaws in the hull before it was too late. Lochridge was also concerned that OceanGate would not perform nondestructive testing on the vessel's hull before undertaking crewed dives and alleged that he was "repeatedly told that no scan of the hull or Bond Line could be done to check for delaminations, porosity and voids of sufficient adhesion of the glue being used due to the thickness of the hull". The viewport was rated to only 650 m (2,130 ft), and the engineer of the viewport also prepared an analysis from an independent expert that concluded the design would fail after only a few 4,000 m (13,000 ft) dives.

OceanGate said that Lochridge, who was not an engineer, had refused to accept safety approvals from OceanGate's engineering team and that the company's evaluation of Titan's hull was stronger than any kind of third-party evaluation Lochridge thought necessary. OceanGate sued Lochridge for allegedly breaching his confidentiality contract and making fraudulent statements. Lochridge counter-sued, stating that his employment had been wrongfully terminated as a whistleblower for stating concerns about Titan's ability to operate safely. The two parties settled the case a few months later, before it came to court. Lochridge also filed a whistleblower complaint with Occupational Safety and Health Administration, but withdrew it after the lawsuit was filed.

Later in 2018, a group organized by William Kohnen, the chair of the Submarine Group of the Marine Technology Society, drafted a letter to Rush expressing "unanimous concern regarding the development of 'TITAN' and the planned Titanic Expedition", indicating that the "current experimental approach ... could result in negative outcomes (from minor to catastrophic) that would have serious consequences for everyone in the industry". The letter said that OceanGate's marketing of the Titan was misleading because it claimed that the submersible would meet or exceed the safety standards of classification society DNV, even though the company had no plans to have the craft certified formally by the society. While the letter was never sent officially by the Marine Technology Society, it did result in a conversation with OceanGate that resulted in some changes, but in the end Rush "agreed to disagree" with the rest of the civilian submarine community. Kohnen told The New York Times that Rush had telephoned him after reading it to tell him that he believed industry standards were stifling innovation. Some signatories stated OceanGate's methods were not representative of the industry.

In March 2018, one of Boeing's engineers involved in the preliminary designs, Mark Negley, carried out an analysis of the hull and emailed Rush directly stating, "We think you are at high risk of a significant failure at or before you reach 4,000 meters. We do not think you have any safety margin." He included a graph of the strain of the design with a skull and crossbones at a red line of 4,000 metres.

Also in March 2018, Rob McCallum, a major deep sea exploration specialist, emailed Rush to warn him he was potentially risking his clients' safety and advised against the submersible's use for commercial purposes until it had been tested independently and classified: "I implore you to take every care in your testing and sea trials and to be very, very conservative." Rush replied that he was "tired of industry players who try to use a safety argument to stop innovation ... We have heard the baseless cries of 'you are going to kill someone' way too often. I take this as a serious personal insult." McCallum then sent Rush another email in which he said: "I think you are potentially placing yourself and your clients in a dangerous dynamic. In your race to Titanic you are mirroring that famous catch cry: 'She is unsinkable'". This prompted OceanGate's lawyers to threaten McCallum with legal action.

In 2022, the British actor and television presenter Ross Kemp, who had participated previously with deep sea dives for the television channel Sky History, had planned to mark the 110th anniversary of the sinking of the Titanic by recording a documentary in which he would undertake a dive to the wreck using Titan. Kemp's agent Jonathan Shalit said that the project was cancelled after checks by production company Atlantic Productions deemed the submersible to be unsafe and not "fit for purpose".

=== Previous incidents ===
In 2021, a new hull was constructed after a previous hull had cracked after 50 submersion dives, only three of which were to 4,000 m. Scale models of the new hull imploded when tested at the UW lab, so a different method of curing the hull was developed and passed a full-sized pressure test at a facility in Maryland. Rush refused to construct new domes and their interface rings, instead instructing engineers to salvage and reuse those parts from the previous hull. Anonymous former employees told Wired that damage to the rings could have weakened the joints between the domes and the new hull. The new submersible also included lifting rings, which had previously been warned against by engineers, who feared that even very small deformations at the interface between the titanium rings and the hull could jeopardize the integrity of the pressure vessel.

External videos
- CBS Sunday Morning: A visit to RMS Titanic. David Pogue, November 27, 2022. (10:19)

In 2022, reporter David Pogue was aboard the surface ship when Titan became lost and could not locate the wreck of the Titanic during a dive. Pogue's November 2022 report for CBS News Sunday Morning, which questioned Titan's safety, went viral on social media after the submersible lost contact with its support ship in June 2023. In the report, Pogue commented to Rush that "it seems like this submersible has some elements of MacGyvery jerry-rigged-ness". He said that a $30 Logitech F710 wireless game controller with modified control sticks was used to steer and pitch the submersible and that construction pipes were used as ballast.

In another 2022 dive to the wreck, one of Titan's thrusters was accidentally installed backwards and the submersible started spinning in circles when trying to move forward near the sea floor. According to the BBC documentary Take Me to Titanic, the issue was bypassed by steering while holding the game controller sideways. According to November 2022 court filings, OceanGate reported that in a 2022 dive, the submersible suffered from battery problems and as a result had to be attached manually to a lifting platform, causing damage to external components.

On July 15, 2022 (dive 80), Titan experienced a "loud acoustic event" as it was ascending, which was heard by the passengers aboard and picked up by Titan's real-time monitoring system (RTM). Data from Titan's strain gauges later revealed that the hull's strain response had permanently shifted following this event. The US Coast Guard investigation found that the loud acoustic event was the carbon fibre delaminating; the BBC described every dive after this one as "a disaster waiting to happen".

== Incident ==
=== Expedition arrangements ===
The voyage was booked in early 2023. Rush offered Jay Bloom two discounted tickets, intending for Bloom and his son to be on the excursion. Bloom was offered a price of $150,000 per seat, rather than the full price of $250,000, with Rush claiming that it was "safer than crossing the street", but Bloom declined the offer due to his concerns about its safety. At that time, the excursion was scheduled for May, but unfavourable weather caused it to be delayed until June.

=== June 16–17 preparations ===
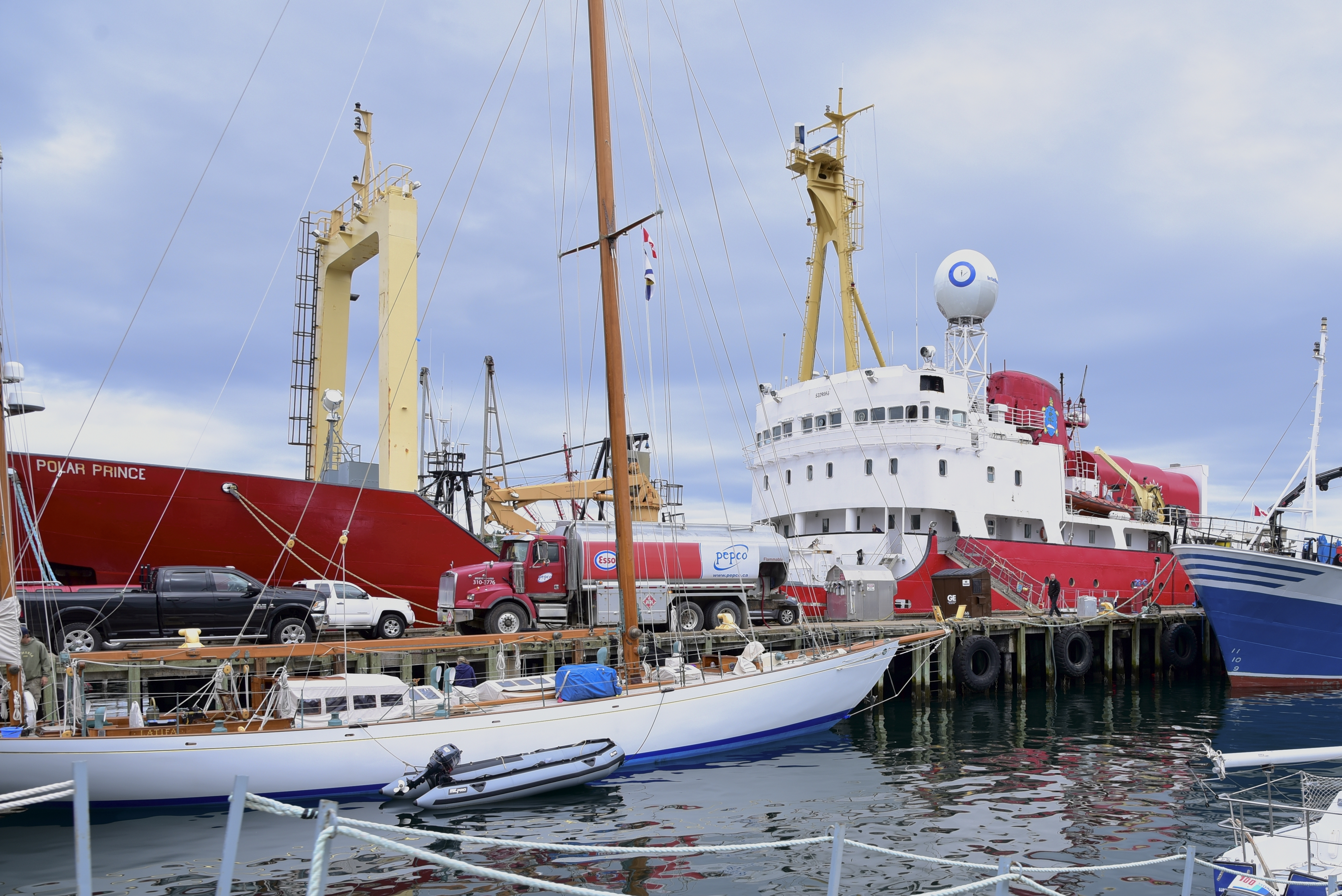
MV Polar Prince (pictured in 2018) transported Titan and the expedition's crew to the dive site above the wreck of Titanic.

On June 16, 2023, at 9:31 a.m., (local time; 12:01 UTC) the expedition to the Titanic's wreck, which the company referred to as "Mission 5", departed from St. John's, Newfoundland, aboard the Canadian-flagged research and expedition ship MV Polar Prince. One of the occupants, Hamish Harding, posted on Facebook: "Due to the worst winter in Newfoundland in 40 years, this mission is likely to be the first and only crewed mission to Titanic in 2023. A weather window has just opened up and we are going to attempt a dive tomorrow." He also indicated that the operation was scheduled to begin about 4:00 a.m. EDT (08:00 UTC).

=== June 18, dive, disappearance, and implosion ===
External videos
- MBI, Titan submersible hearing, September 16, 2024
- Animation: Transit of MV Polar Prince and dive of Titan (10:56)

The ship arrived in the vicinity of the Titanic wreck site on June 18 at 5:15 a.m. Newfoundland Daylight Time (NDT; UTC−02:30). Around 8:30 a.m., five people were on-boarded into the Titan, mounted on top of a floating platform, known as the launch and recovery system (LARS). Subsequently, the forward dome was secured for the expedition, designated by the company as "Dive 88". At 8:55 a.m., the platform was vented, causing it to sink below the surface of the water. At 9:18 a.m., Titan disengaged from the platform and commenced diving. For the first hour and a half of the descent, Titan communicated with Polar Prince via text about every 15 minutes, and sent Polar Prince an automated positioning "ping" every 5 to 10 seconds. At a depth of 2,274 metres (7,461 ft), the submarine sent "all good here", and usual "pings" continued on the communications channel. There were no messages during the descent that indicated trouble. A final text communication was sent from Titan at 10:47:27 a.m., at an approximate depth of 3,341 metres (10,961 ft) which read "dropped two wts". The final "ping" (data) from Titan was received at 10:47:33 a.m. NDT (13:17:33 UTC), at depth of 3,346 metres (10,978 ft). Titan's location was 41.73441°N 49.9424°W. Before this final text was displayed, (Note: US Coast Guard investigators determined that there was a delay of 15 to 30 seconds between the time a message from Titan was sent and its display on the surface team's console.) a loud bang was heard by people on the support ship. It was later determined that this bang was the sound of the submersible imploding.

A US Navy acoustic detection system designed to locate military submarines detected an acoustic signal consistent with an implosion at 11:04 a.m. (13:34 UTC), less than two hours after Titan submerged. OceanGate had not informed any government agency that they were diving. Since the small composite submersible did not conform to known acoustic profiles of large military submarines with metal hulls, it was classed as "an anomaly".

Shortly after the disaster, James Cameron indicated that it was likely that the submersible's early warning system alerted the passengers to an impending delamination of the hull, saying "we understand from inside the community that they had dropped their ascent weights and were coming up, trying to manage an emergency." In a 2024 interview with 60 Minutes Australia, Cameron stated that "nobody could admit that they didn't have the means to go down and look", referring to the limitations faced by parties attempting to reach the last known position. Oceanographer Bob Ballard, the discoverer of the Titanic wreck, also said that the crew was likely "experiencing difficulties" and was trying to ascend at the time of the implosion.

In September 2024, Tym Catterson, an OceanGate contractor who was aboard the Polar Prince at the time of the disaster, testified at the United States Coast Guard's inquiry that there was no indication the crew was aware of any problems before the implosion. The last human-written communication by Titan indicated that they dropped two weights, amounting to about 30 kilograms (70 lb) of the 90 to 140 kilograms (200 to 300 lb) of dropweights on board. This was apparently routine to adjust the Titan's buoyancy from negative to neutral as it approached the seabed, and was an indication that the crew was not aware of any emergency situation. The last automatic ping was received by the Polar Prince approximately six seconds later, after which contact was lost.

Simulations developed in 2023 suggest that due to the immense pressure – over 330 standard atmospheres (33 MPa; 4,800 psi) – implosion of the vessel likely took only a few milliseconds, fast enough to kill the occupants before they became aware of it.

=== June 18–22, search and rescue efforts ===
Rear Admiral John Mauger holds a press briefing in Boston on June 19.

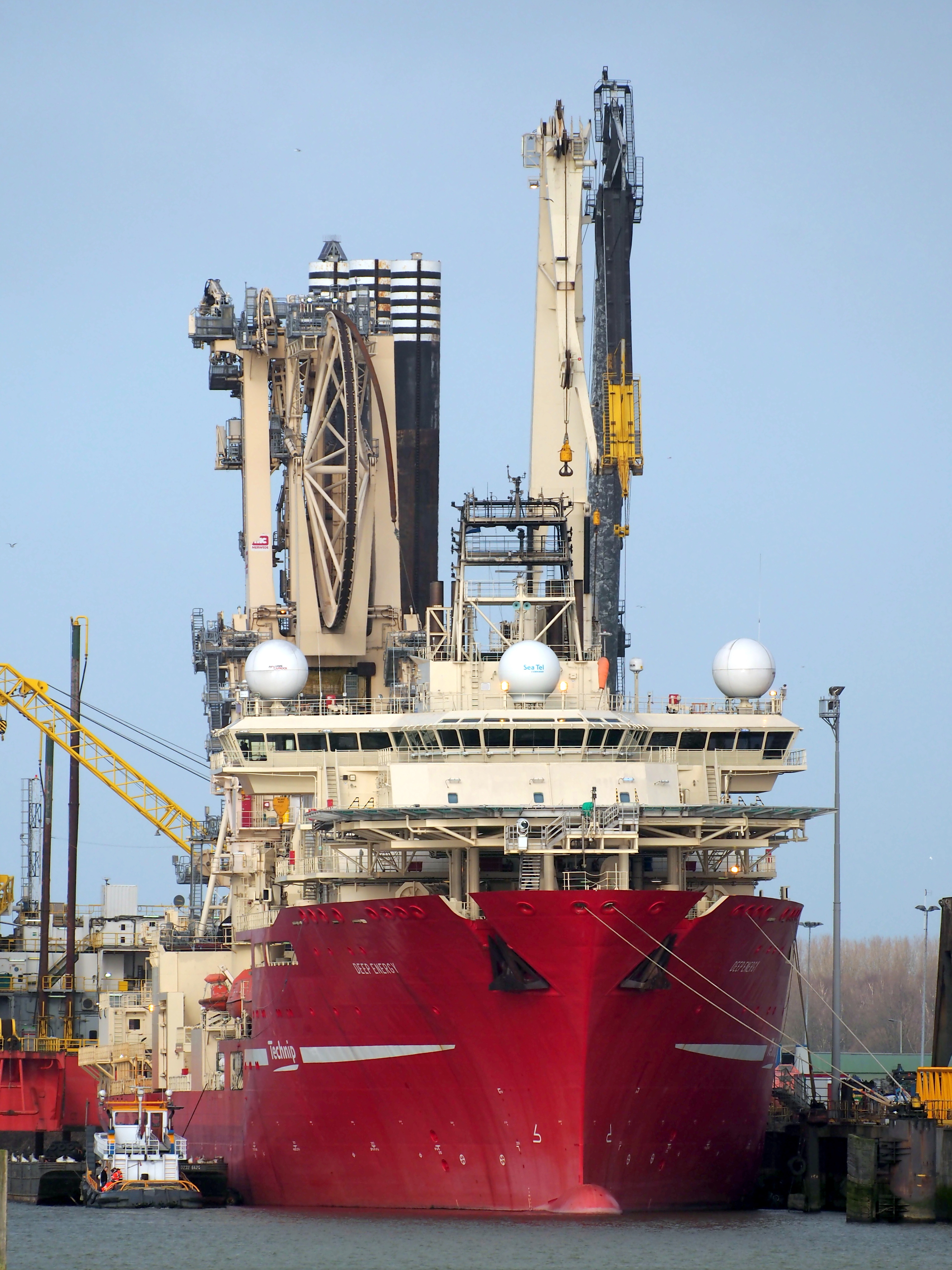
Ship Deep Energy (pictured in the Netherlands, 2015) arrived with two ROVs on June 20.

The submersible was expected to resurface at 4:30 p.m. (19:00 UTC). At 7:10 p.m. (21:40 UTC), the US Coast Guard was notified that the vessel was missing. The Navy reviewed its acoustic data from that time and passed the information about the possible implosion event to the Coast Guard. Titan had as much as 96 hours of breathable air supply for its five passengers when it set out, which would have expired on the morning of June 22, 2023 if the submersible had remained intact.

The United States Coast Guard, United States Navy, and Canadian Coast Guard organized the search. Aircraft from the Royal Canadian Air Force and United States Air National Guard, a Royal Canadian Navy ship, and several commercial and research ships and remotely operated underwater vehicle (ROVs) also assisted with the search. The surface was searched, as were the depths by sonar.

Crews from the United States Coast Guard launched search missions 900 nautical miles (1,700 km) from the shore of Cape Cod, Massachusetts. Joint Rescue Coordination Centre Halifax reported that a Royal Canadian Air Force Lockheed CP-140 Aurora aircraft and CCGS Kopit Hopson 1752 were participating in the search in response to a request for assistance by the Maritime Rescue Coordination Center in Boston made on 18 June at 9:43 p.m. (00:13 UTC). The search on 19 June involved three C-130 Hercules aircraft, two from the United States and one from Canada; a P-8 Poseidon anti-submarine warfare aircraft from the United States, and sonobuoys. Search and rescue was hampered by low-visibility weather conditions, which cleared the next day.

The US Coast Guard indicated that the search and rescue mission was difficult because of the remote location, weather, darkness, sea conditions, and water temperature. Rear Admiral John Mauger said that they were "deploying all available assets". Many submersibles have acoustic beacons that can be detected underwater by rescuers; it is unclear whether Titan was equipped with such a device.

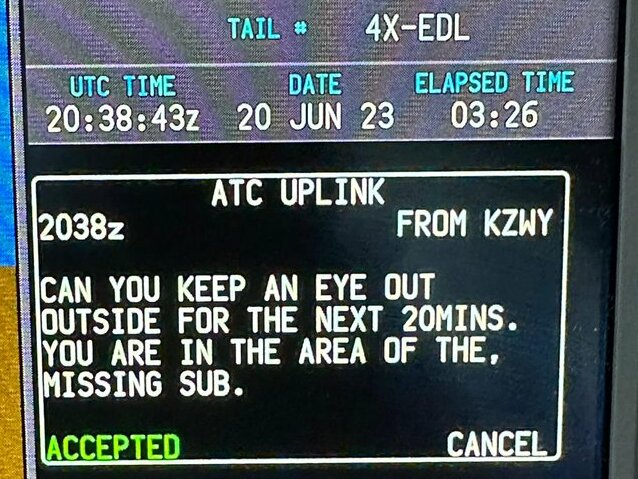
Passing aircraft were asked to look out for Titan, as seen in this New York Oceanic (KZWY) air traffic control CPDLC message, displayed in the cockpit of an El Al Boeing 787 on June 20.

The pipe-laying ship Deep Energy, operated by TechnipFMC, arrived on site on June 20, 2023, with two ROVs and other equipment suited to the seabed depths in the area. As of 10:45 a.m. (13:15 UTC), the US Coast Guard had searched 26,000 square kilometres (10,000 sq mi). The New York Air National Guard's 106th Rescue Wing joined in the search and rescue mission with a HC-130J, with plans for two more to join by the end of the day.

According to an internal US government memo, a Canadian CP-140 Aurora's sonar picked up underwater noises while searching for the submersible. The US Coast Guard officially acknowledged the sounds early the next morning, but reported that early investigations had not yielded results. Rear Admiral John Mauger of the US Coast Guard said the source of the noise was unknown and may have come from the many metal objects at the site of the wreck. A Canadian CP-140 Aurora airplane had previously spotted a "white rectangular object" floating on the surface. A ship sent to find and identify the object was diverted to help find the source of the noise. The noises were later described by the US Coast Guard as being apparently unrelated to the missing vessel.

CCGS John Cabot arrived on the morning of June 21, bringing additional sonar capabilities to the search effort. Commercial vessels Skandi Vinland and Atlantic Merlin also arrived that day, as did a US Coast Guard C-130 crew. As of about 3:00 p.m. (17:30 UTC), five air and water vehicles were searching actively for Titan, and another five were expected to arrive in the next 24–48 hours. Search and rescue assets included two ROVs, one CP-140 Aurora aircraft, and the C-130 aircraft.

The US Navy's Flyaway Deep Ocean Salvage System (FADOSS), a ship lift system designed to lift large and heavy objects from the deep sea, arrived in St. John's, though no ships were available to carry the system to the wreck site. Officials estimated it would take about 24 hours to weld the FADOSS system to the deck of a carrier ship before it could set sail to the search and rescue operation.

Despite increasing concerns about the depletion of air supplies in Titan, a US Coast Guard spokesperson said at a press conference "This is a search and rescue mission 100%", rather than a wreckage recovery mission.

Capt. Jamie Frederick holds a press briefing in Boston on June 21.

An Odysseus 6k ROV from Pelagic Research Services, travelling aboard the Canadian-flagged offshore tugboat MV Horizon Arctic, reached the sea floor and began its search for the missing submersible. The French RV L'Atalante also deployed its ROV Victor 6000, which can reach depths of as much as 6,000 m (20,000 ft) and transmit images to the surface.

=== June 22, discovery of debris ===
Rear Admiral John Mauger holds a press briefing in Boston on June 22.

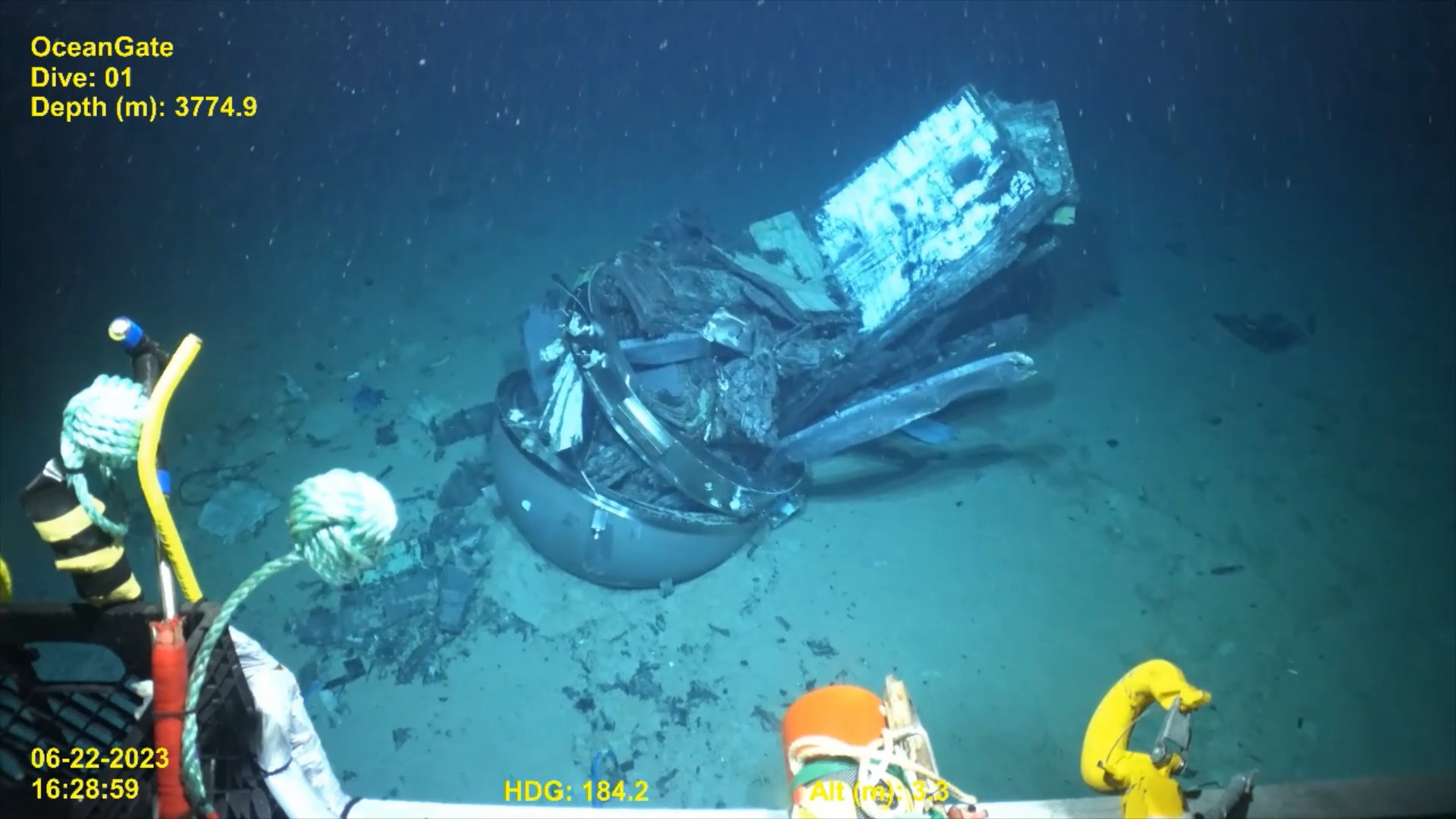
Wreckage of the aft section discovered on 22 June

An ROV from the Horizon Arctic inspecting Titan on the ocean floor, 22 June

At 1:18 p.m. (15:48 UTC) on June 22 the US Coast Guard's Northeast Sector announced that a debris field had been found near the wreck of the Titanic. The debris, located by Pelagic Research Services' Odysseus 6k ROV five hours into its search, was later confirmed to be part of the submersible. At 4:30 p.m. (19:00 UTC) — at a US Coast Guard press conference in Boston — the Coast Guard said that the loss of the submersible was due to an implosion of the pressure chamber and that pieces of Titan had been found on the sea floor about 500 metres (1,600 ft) northeast of the bow of the Titanic.

The identified debris consisted of the tail cone (not part of the pressure vessel) and the forward and aft end bells — both part of the pressure vessel intended to protect the crew from the ocean environment. According to the US Coast Guard, the debris field was concentrated in two areas, with the aft end bell lying separate from the front end bell and the tail cone.

Rear Admiral John Mauger of the US Coast Guard said that the debris was consistent with a "catastrophic loss of the pressure chamber". Mauger stated that he did not have an answer as to whether the bodies of those on board would be recovered, but he did say that it was "an incredibly unforgiving environment".

=== Fatalities ===
The implosion killed all five occupants:

Name	Age	Nationality	Notable information
Shahzada Dawood	48	Pakistani-British-Maltese	Director of Dawood Hercules Corporation and philanthropist, a son of Pakistani businessman Hussain Dawood and grandson of Pakistani industrialist Ahmed Dawood.
Suleman Dawood	19	Pakistani-British	Son of Shahzada Dawood, student at the University of Strathclyde, and the youngest on board; his mother Christine Dawood gave up her seat for him to go down.
Hamish Harding	58	British	Businessman, aviator, and space tourist; previously descended into the Challenger Deep, set Guinness World Record for fastest circumnavigation of the Earth, flew into space in 2022 on Blue Origin NS-21
Paul-Henri Nargeolet	77	French	Former French Navy commander, diver, submersible pilot; member of the French Institute for Research and Exploitation of the Sea, director of underwater research for E/M Group and RMS Titanic Inc., directed over 35 expeditions to the wreck, supervised the recovery of thousands of artifacts, and was "widely considered the leading authority on the wreck site".
Stockton Rush	61	American	Submersible pilot, engineer, businessman; CEO and co-founder of OceanGate.

== Recovery operations ==
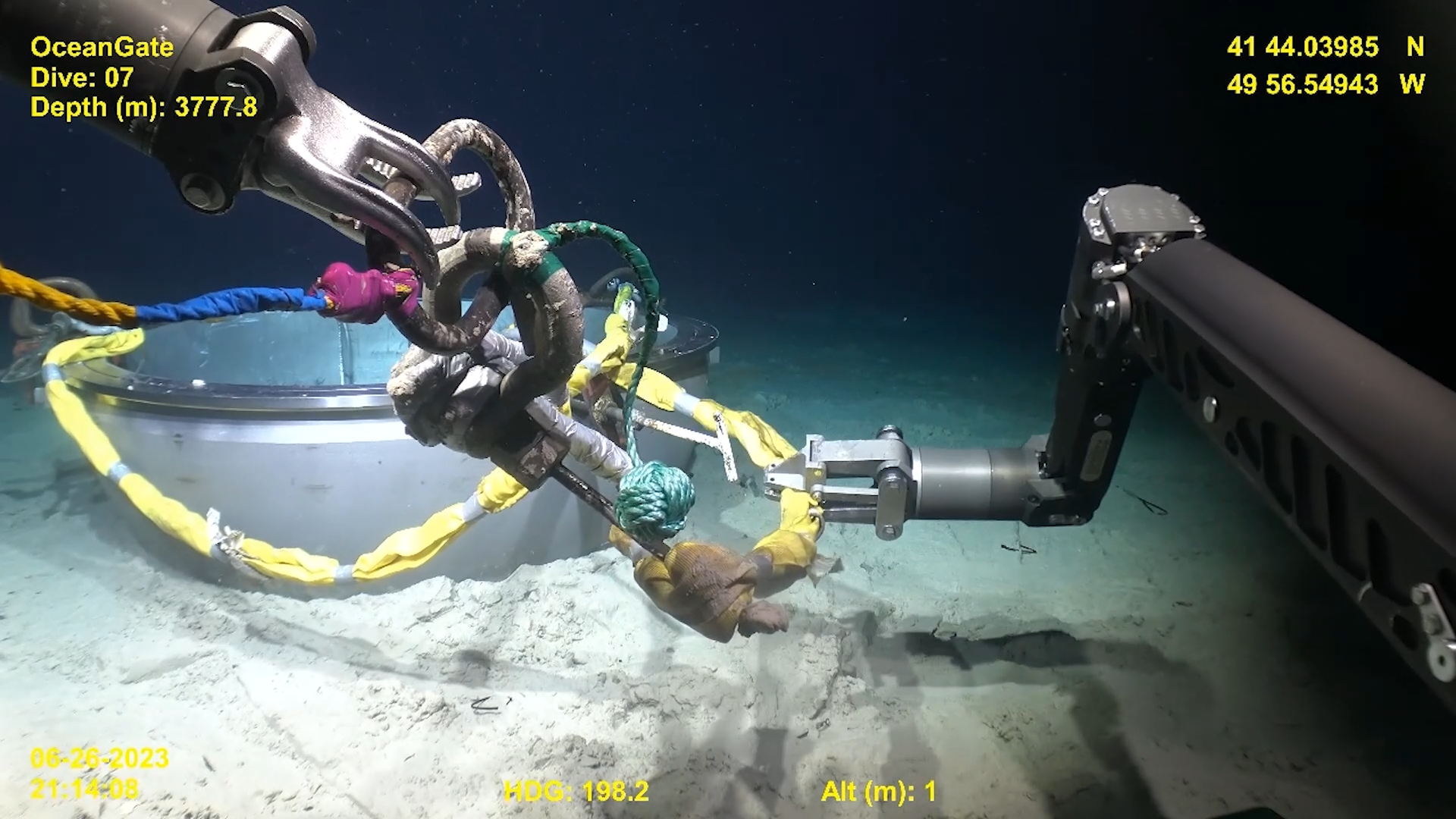
ROV recovery operation of the forward endcap, June 26

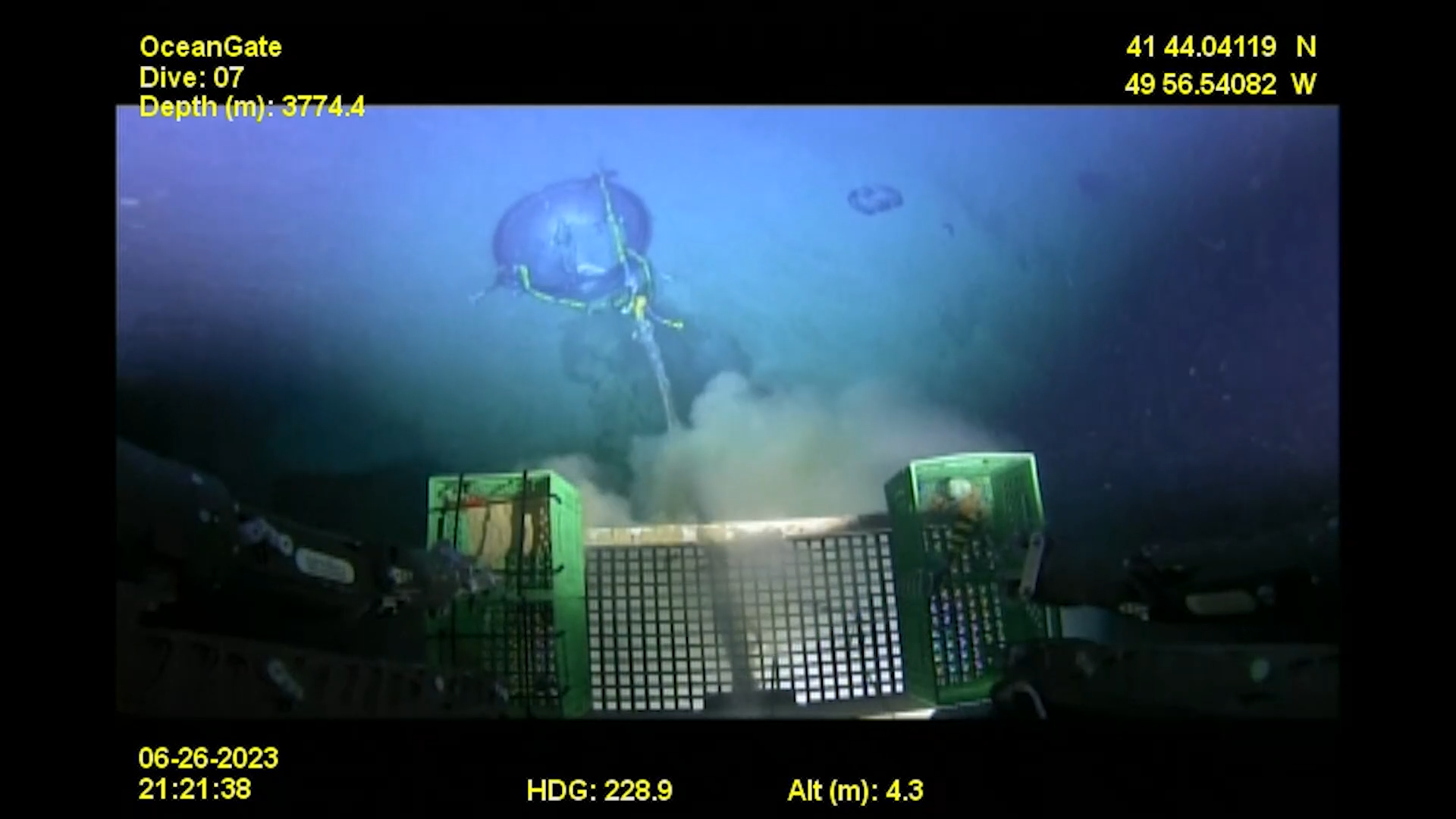
ROV lifting the forward endcap

Pelagic Research Services confirmed on June 23, 2023 that a new mission to the Titan debris field was already underway and that it had taken the Odysseus 6k ROV one hour to reach the site to continue searching and documenting debris.

It was further reported that the debris from Titan was too heavy for Pelagic's ROV to lift and that any recovery would need to occur at a later time.

On June 24, Polar Prince returned to St. John's harbour. In their bid to understand what caused Titan's catastrophic loss, investigators boarded the support ship. Another boat was seen in the harbour towing the floating launch platform, which the company referred to as the launch and recovery system (LARS), which Titan used.

On June 28, Horizon Arctic returned to St. John's Harbour with the remains of Titan that were recovered from the debris field. Photographs and videos showed the titanium covers on both ends of Titan intact, with the single viewport missing, mangled pieces of the tail cone, electronics, the landing frame and other debris. The debris was to be transported to the US as evidence for the investigation. The Coast Guard confirmed that presumed human remains were found within the debris, and that American medical professionals would conduct an analysis. Pelagic Research Services, which was operating the Odysseus 6K ROV from Horizon Arctic, confirmed that its team had completed their mission. The initial human remains underwent DNA testing, but no report was released shortly after. In September 2024, during the public hearing by the Marine Board of Investigation, USCG confirmed that the Armed Forces DNA Identification Laboratory, located in Dover, Delaware, positively identified DNA profiles for the five victims. (Note: It has been reported by USCG that upon positive identification of DNA samples, the Rhode Island Medical Examiner (US) coordinated decedent affairs with the families.)

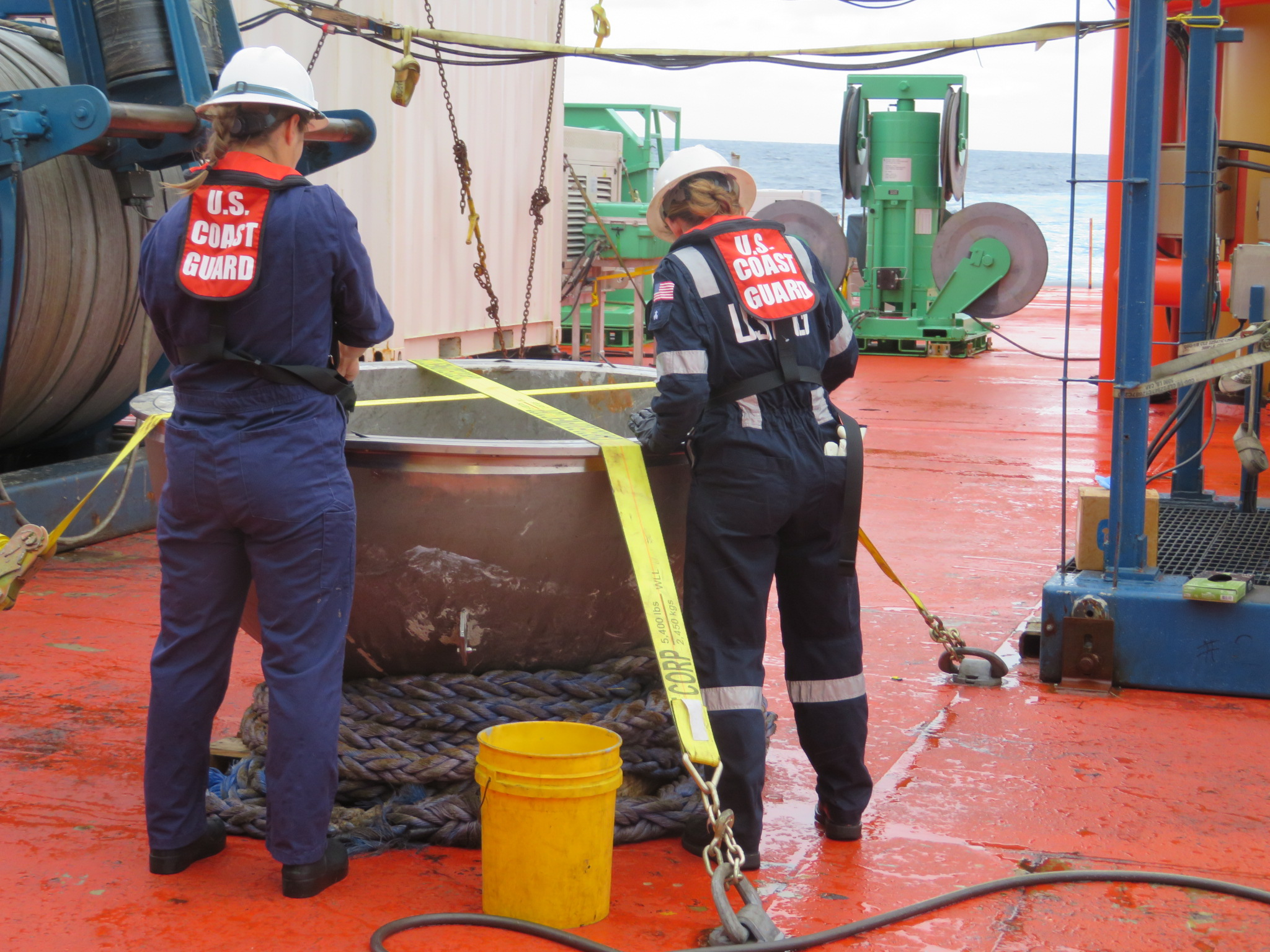
Aft endcap of the submersible, recovered 4 October

On June 30, Insider published an analysis of the recovery photos by University of Plymouth professor Jasper Graham-Jones. He concluded that a failure of the carbon-fibre hull was the most likely cause of the loss, given that no large pieces of carbon fibre are known to have been recovered. Another possible cause was the acrylic viewing window. He noted that the window was absent from its bell housing when it was recovered. While the salvage team may have removed the window before salvaging its bell housing, they more likely would have left it in place. Graham-Jones said that if the window had failed before the hull rather than after, he would have expected larger pieces of carbon fibre to be recovered.

During early October, engineers recovered the rest of the debris and presumed human remains.

== Investigations ==
On June 23, both the Canadian and the United States federal governments announced that they were beginning investigations of the incident. They were joined by authorities from France (Bureau d'Enquêtes sur les Événements de Mer, BEAmer) and the United Kingdom (Marine Accident Investigation Branch, MAIB) by June 25; the final report will be issued to the International Maritime Organization (IMO). Whether lasting reforms will result from the investigation is uncertain. While there are a variety of possible options, the IMO may not have appropriate regulatory authority.

=== Canada ===
The Transportation Safety Board of Canada (TSB) investigated because Titan's support vessel, MV Polar Prince, is a Canadian-flagged ship. A team of TSB investigators headed to the port of origin, St. John's, Newfoundland, to "gather information, conduct interviews and assess the occurrence", with other agencies also expected to be involved. The Royal Canadian Mounted Police (RCMP) also announced that it was performing a preliminary examination of the incident in order to determine whether to begin a full investigation, which would occur if the RCMP determined criminal, federal, or provincial laws were broken. On June 17, 2026, the TSB released the final report on the accident, concluding like their US counterpart in October 2025 that multiple cost-cutting measures, lack of testing, inadequate monitoring, risk-management and procedures led to the implosion of the submersible caused by detectable manufacturing defects and that the company subsequently ignored sensor data showing a major incident in a preceding dive that could have led to retirement of the vessel before the catastrophic failure.

=== United States ===
The United States investigation was directed by the Coast Guard (USCG), which had declared the incident a "major marine casualty", with support from the National Transportation Safety Board (NTSB). USCG Captain Jason Neubauer was named chief investigator for the Marine Board of Investigation. Though the investigation was originally anticipated to be completed within one year, Neubauer acknowledged at the one-year mark that it was "a complex and ongoing effort", adding: "We are working closely with our domestic and international partners to ensure a comprehensive understanding of the incident."

The public hearings for the Marine Board of Investigation were held September 16–27, 2024 in Charleston, South Carolina. They were convened under the joint authority of the NTSB and the US Coast Guard. All of the testimony was livestreamed through YouTube. In addition to providing the recorded testimony, the US Coast Guard provided over 100 exhibits, photos, animations, and other supporting documents on the MBI website. Notable testimony was provided by: Tony Nissen (former Director of Engineering, OceanGate); David Lochridge (former Director of Marine Operations and whistleblower, OceanGate); Patrick Lahey (CEO, Triton Submarines); Roy Thomas (Sr. Principal Engineer, American Bureau of Shipping); Phil Brooks (former Director of Engineering, OceanGate); Don Kramer (NTSB Materials Laboratory); William Kohnen (Hydrospace Group); Justin Jackson (NASA); and Mark Negley (Boeing). There were a total of 25 witnesses who gave testimony during the MBI and two more "mission specialists" interviewed after the MBI hearings. Some of the key observations by the media include the repeated theme of putting cost above safety concerns, OceanGate's refusal to listen to safety concerns from staff or experts, and over 100 equipment issues over the two years prior to the final dive.

In videos of the wreckage released by the US Coast Guard, evidence of the hull delaminating is present, and has been verified through analysis conducted by the NTSB following the retrieval of the wreckage. The analysis also details a number of other issues with the manufacture of the submersible. In order to achieve the required thickness of the hull, wrinkles in the hull were machined away and another layer of carbon fibre was glued onto it. The adhesive used was discovered to vary in thickness, and even contained voids, and caused uneven levels of adhesion to separate layers. Evidence of rubbing damage was discovered, where the adhesive had turned into a powder by the forces of delamination. Additionally, porosity was discovered in the manufacture of the hull.

The analysis also contains details of the RTM system which OceanGate claimed would provide "early warning detection". On Dive 80 on July 15, 2022, an extreme spike on one of the acoustic sensors was noted during the ascent to the surface. A loud bang was reported by the passengers during this dive, which Kramer determined was the cause for the spike. This coincided with anomalous strain readings, resulting in the next 3 dives following the spike containing a non-linear relationship between strain and depth, before settling back into a linear relationship.

On August 5, 2025, the Marine Board of Investigation released its Results of Investigation (ROI) report. Under International Maritime Organization protocols, the US Coast Guard designated the governments of Canada, United Kingdom, and France as participating as "substantially interested states". While the USCG was the lead US agency for the marine casualty investigation, the National Transportation Safety Board conducted joint evidence collection as part of their own concurrent investigations. The NTSB investigation into the hull failure is still ongoing as of the release of the USCG ROI. The USCG and NTSB investigations were assisted by the National Oceanic and Atmospheric Administration (NOAA); Federal Bureau of Investigation (FBI); Bureau of Alcohol, Tobacco, Firearms, and Explosives (ATF); Armed Forces Medical Examiners System (AFMES); Department of Defense DNA Identification Laboratory; and Rhode Island Medical Examiner.

The USCG ROI focused more on the company processes, procedures, and compliance with regulations and established practices than a detailed technical report of the failure. The hull failure investigation is under the NTSB. The USCG ROI placed the blame on OceanGate and stated that the Titan submersible accident was "preventable". The report cited critically flawed safety practices, including the use of an uncertified carbon fibre hull, failure to investigate prior anomalies, and neglected maintenance. It noted that OceanGate operated outside regulatory oversight by misrepresenting its expeditions as scientific, and fostered a toxic internal culture that suppressed employee concerns. The board issued 17 safety recommendations and concluded the loss of five lives could have been avoided through proper oversight and accountability. The report also noted that Stockton Rush, in his dual role as CEO and Master or Pilot of Titan, exhibited negligence, and may have been subject to criminal charges. The report also noted the pursuit of criminal charges would be at the discretion of the Department of Justice after its own investigation and analysis, which will not occur due to the death of Rush.

This does not preclude other investigations from filing charges. In addition to the NTSB investigation continuing after the release of the USCG ROI, there are reports of investigations into Oceangate regarding fraud.

After the release of investigation documents from the MBI in 2024 and the findings of the ROI in 2025, other technical work has been published regarding the Titan implosion, including a legal review of the "duty to rescue", and structural review of the submersible.

== Lawsuit ==
On August 6, 2024, Nargeolet's family sued OceanGate for wrongful death. The family of Nargeolet sought $50 million in damages, claiming that OceanGate and Stockton Rush failed to disclose the condition and durability of the submersible as well as its composition and components. The lawsuit further alleged that many of the flaws with the vessel were not disclosed and purposely concealed. The lawsuit stated that "experts agree that the Titan's crew would have realized exactly what was happening", in relation to the implosion.

The case was initially requested to move to a federal court in January 2025, but a federal judge moved it back to a state court by February.

== Financial costs of operations ==
Numerous assets from the US Air Force and the US Coast Guard were deployed to search for the submersible, and to subsequently retrieve the victims' remains. On June 23, 2023, a Washington Post analysis made by Mark Cancian, a defence budget expert, estimated the costs of US Coast Guard operations alone at about USD$1.2 million of taxpayers' money as of June 23, 2023, with the additional operations to recover the submersible's debris not included. Cancian said that while the Titan search operation was funded by money already in the federal budget, the US military would assume some unexpected costs, since personnel and equipment were used in an unforeseen manner. Deploying a single Lockheed CP-140 Aurora aircraft and 341 sonobuoys cost Canadian taxpayers at least CAD$3 million, and the total Canadian contribution is likely to be much greater when all expenditures are tallied.

Chris Boyer of the National Association for Search and Rescue said the search for Titan likely cost millions of dollars of public funds. The USCG refused to give an estimate, saying they "do not associate cost with saving a life". According to US attorney Stephen Koerting, the USCG is generally prohibited by federal law from collecting reimbursement related to any search or rescue service.

The incident renewed debates about whether taxpayers should bear the cost of search and rescue missions involving wealthy people engaged in high-risk adventuring, such as incidents involving Steve Fossett and Richard Branson.

== Reactions ==
Discussing the scale of the search and rescue response, Sean Leet, co-founder and chair of Horizon Maritime Services, the company that owns Polar Prince, said:

I've been in the marine industry since a very young age and seen a lot of different situations, and I've never seen equipment of that nature move that quickly [...] The response from the US Coast Guard, the US Military, folks at the airport, the people here, various companies who were involved in the mobilization of that equipment [...] it was done flawlessly.

— Sean Leet, June 2023, CNN

The scale of the search and rescue efforts and media coverage compared to those for the Pylos migrant boat disaster, which occurred days earlier, sparked criticism. In the Ionian Sea off the coast of Pylos, Messenia, Greece, a fishing boat sank while carrying an estimated 400 to 750 migrants, resulting in nearly 100 persons confirmed dead, another 100 rescued, and hundreds more missing and presumed dead. Search and rescue efforts for the migrant ship were conducted by the Hellenic Coast Guard and military. Ishaan Tharoor of The Washington Post wrote that Pakistani Internet users compared and contrasted the Pakistani victims in both incidents, who were on opposite sides of Pakistan's large socioeconomic divide.

According to David Scott-Beddard, the CEO of White Star Memories Ltd, a Titanic exhibition company, the likelihood of performing future research at the Titanic wreck decreased due to the incident.

James Cameron, who directed the 1997 movie Titanic, visited the Titanic wreck 33 times, and piloted Deepsea Challenger to the bottom of the Mariana Trench, said he was "struck by the similarity" between the submersible's implosion and the events that resulted in the Titanic disaster. He noted that both disasters seemed preventable, and were caused indirectly by someone deliberately ignoring safety warnings from others. Cameron criticized the choice of carbon-fibre composite construction of the pressure vessel, saying it has "no strength in compression" when subject to the immense pressures at depth. Cameron said that pressure hulls should be made out of contiguous materials such as steel, titanium, ceramic, or acrylic, and that the wound carbon fibre of Titan's hull had seemed like a bad idea to him from the beginning. He stated that it was long known that composite hulls were vulnerable to microscopic water ingress, delamination, and progressive failure over time. He also criticized Rush's real-time monitoring of the hull as an inadequate solution that would do little to prevent an implosion. Cameron expressed regret for not being more outspoken about these concerns before the accident, and criticized what he termed "false hopes" being presented to the victims' families; he and his colleagues realized early on that for communication and tracking (the latter housed in a separate pressure vessel, with its own battery) to be lost simultaneously, the cause was almost certainly a catastrophic implosion.

The Logitech F710 game controller used to steer Titan sold out on Amazon soon after the incident, which was described as "a more benign form of disaster tourism" by the New York weblog the Cut.

== In social and mass media ==
The submersible became widely discussed on social media as the story developed and was the subject of "public schadenfreude", inspiring grimly humorous Internet memes, namely interactive video game recreations and image macros that ridiculed the submersible's deficient construction, OceanGate's perceived poor safety record, and the individuals who died. The memes were criticized as insensitive, with David Pogue regarding such media as "inappropriate and a little bit sick". Some have felt the negative reaction to the victims may be a response to past news coverage of other expeditions by billionaires, often using their own companies such as Blue Origin. Molly Roberts wrote in The Washington Post that those joking about the incident were demonstrating Internet users' impulses to be ironic, provocative, and angry with each other, combined with an "eat-the-rich attitude".

According to Pamela Rutledge, professor of media psychology at Fielding Graduate University, the Titan incident was widely treated on social media as entertainment. Major elements include the allure of disasters, fascination with the wealthy, conspiracy theories, uncertainty, and the mythology of the Titanic, as well as the romance of rescue operations. Rutledge opined that the trend displayed a lack of accountability and empathy, asserting there is a need for individuals to rethink the way they use social media.

In September 2023, it was announced that a film about the implosion, titled Salvaged, was in development. The amount of media coverage and public attention for the Titan incident was criticized by people such as Barack Obama, the former U.S president, commenting that the contemporaneous 2023 Pylos migrant boat disaster had received much less attention.

In February 2024, a film inspired by the incident, titled Locker, was announced. Written and directed by Australian filmmaker Peter Ninos, the film draws inspiration from the extensive media coverage of the disaster, particularly speculation that the occupants may have remained alive for several days after losing contact, the reports of possible banging sounds detected underwater, and the widely publicised countdown of the submersible's estimated remaining oxygen supply. The film presents a fictional scenario in which a submersible, the Orion, becomes stranded on the ocean floor rather than suffering a catastrophic implosion. The film was later screened on Australia's Nine Network.

The 2024 ABC special Truth and Lies: Fatal Dive to the Titanic examined the implosion. In March 2024, a two-part documentary by ITN Productions, Minute by Minute: The Titan Sub Disaster, was broadcast by UK's Channel 5. The documentary included interviews with the Canadian air crew that searched the surface, Edward Cassano of the Pelagic remotely-operated vehicle team that found the wreckage, and members of the Marine Technology Society who had warned OceanGate about their deviation from accepted engineering practices in 2018. Analysis of the mysterious "banging" sounds that seemed to indicate the occupants were still alive was a main feature of the first part.

In May 2025, the BBC and Discovery Channel aired Implosion: The Titanic Sub Disaster, a documentary co-produced with other international broadcasters. It features exclusive access to the US Coast Guard's investigation, previously unseen footage, expert interviews, and archive footage of an interview with Rush and of a Titan dive filmed for a possible TV feature under consideration by Discovery Channel host Josh Gates. The film includes a video recorded aboard the Titan's support vessel that appears to capture the sound of the implosion, during which Wendy Rush, the wife of OceanGate CEO Stockton Rush, is heard asking, "What was that bang?" The documentary questions OceanGate's safety practices and whether the tragedy could have been prevented.

On June 11, 2025, Netflix released the documentary Titan: The OceanGate Disaster. The documentary primarily examines a number of issues, such as Rush, OceanGate's manufacturing and operating practices prior to the implosion, as well as the cause, response, and aftermath. The documentary includes interviews with former OceanGate employees, whistleblowers, and government officials.

In April 2026, Christine Dawood, the wife of Shahzada and mother of Suleman, gave an interview to the British newspaper The Guardian detailing her account of events surrounding the voyage and the aftermath. She announced a book about her experiences called Ninety-Six Hours, which was published by Whitefox on May 12, 2026.

== See also ==
- List of shipwrecks in 2023
- List of submarine and submersible incidents since 2000
