= Bob Hamm =

American football player (born 1959)

No. 90, 95
- Position: Defensive end

Personal information
- Born: April 24, 1959 (age 67); Kansas City, Missouri, U.S.
- Listed height: 6 ft 4 in (1.93 m)
- Listed weight: 260 lb (118 kg)

Career information
- High school: Saint Francis (Mountain View, California)
- College: Nevada (1979–1982)
- NFL draft: 1983: undrafted

Career history
- Kansas City Chiefs (1983)*; Houston Oilers (1983–1984); Kansas City Chiefs (1985–1986); New York Jets (1987)*; Indianapolis Colts (1987)
- * Offseason or practice squad member only

Career NFL statistics
- Sacks: 6
- Fumble recoveries: 1
- Stats at Pro Football Reference

Robert Hamm (born April 24, 1959) is an American former professional football player who was a defensive end for four seasons in the National Football League (NFL) with the Houston Oilers, Kansas City Chiefs and Indianapolis Colts. He played college football for the Nevada Wolf Pack.

== Early life and college ==
Robert Hamm was born on April 24, 1959, in Kansas City, Missouri. He attended Saint Francis High School in Mountain View, California.

Hamm attended the University of Nevada, Reno, where he was a member of the Wolf Pack from 1979 to 1982. He was a letterman in 1980 and 1982.

== Professional career ==
After going undrafted in the 1983 NFL draft, Hamm signed with the Kansas City Chiefs on May 9, 1983. He was waived on August 29, 1983.

Hamm was claimed off waivers by the Houston Oilers on August 30, 1983. He played all 16 games during his rookie season in 1983, starting 12 after replacing Malcolm Taylor, and recorded three sacks. He was placed on injured reserve the next year on August 28, 1984. He was activated on September 28 and started the final 12 games of the 1984 season, totaling two sacks and one fumble recovery.

On April 30, 1985, the Oilers traded Hamm and a 1986 fourth round draft pick to the Chiefs for a 1985 fifth round pick, 1985 sixth round pick, and a 1986 conditional pick. Hamm played in 14 games, starting five, for the Chiefs during the 1985 season and made one sack before being placed on injured reserve on December 11, 1985. He was placed on injured reserve again on August 25, 1986, and was later released on November 4, 1986.

Hamm signed with the New York Jets on March 26, 1987. He was released on June 10, 1987.

On September 23, 1987, Hamm signed with the Indianapolis Colts during the 1987 NFL players strike. He appeared in three games for the Colts that season. He was released on October 20, 1987, after the strike ended. He later signed a futures contract with the Colts on December 10, 1987, but retired on July 31, 1988.
