= Antipodes (submersible) =

Commercial submarine built in 1973

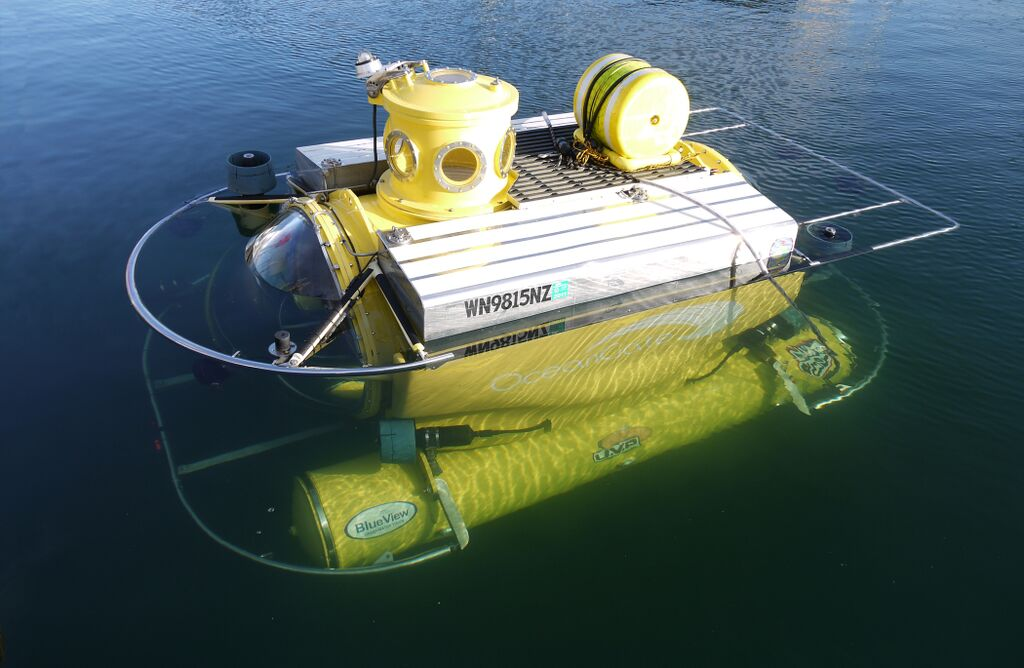
- Antipodes submersible partially submerged

History

United States
- Name: Antipodes
- Owner: OceanGate, Inc.
- Operator: OceanGate, Inc.

General characteristics
- Class & type: American Bureau of Shipping (ABS) + A-1 Submersible (ABS ID: 7310882)
- Length: 4.5 m (15 ft)
- Beam: 2.3 m (7 ft 7 in)
- Height: 2.4 m (7 ft 10 in)
- Propulsion: Six 2 hp (1.5 kW) reversible thrusters vectored for 3-axis maneuvering
- Speed: 1 knot (1.9 km/h; 1.2 mph) (cruising), 3 knots (max)
- Range: Up to 305 meters / 1,000 feet
- Endurance: 72 hours (w/5 persons)
- Capacity: 5 persons
- Notes: 1240+ total dives

Antipodes is a five-person crewed submersible. Antipodes is certified by the American Bureau of Shipping (ABS) and has completed more than 1,300 dives in a variety of sea conditions.

== History ==
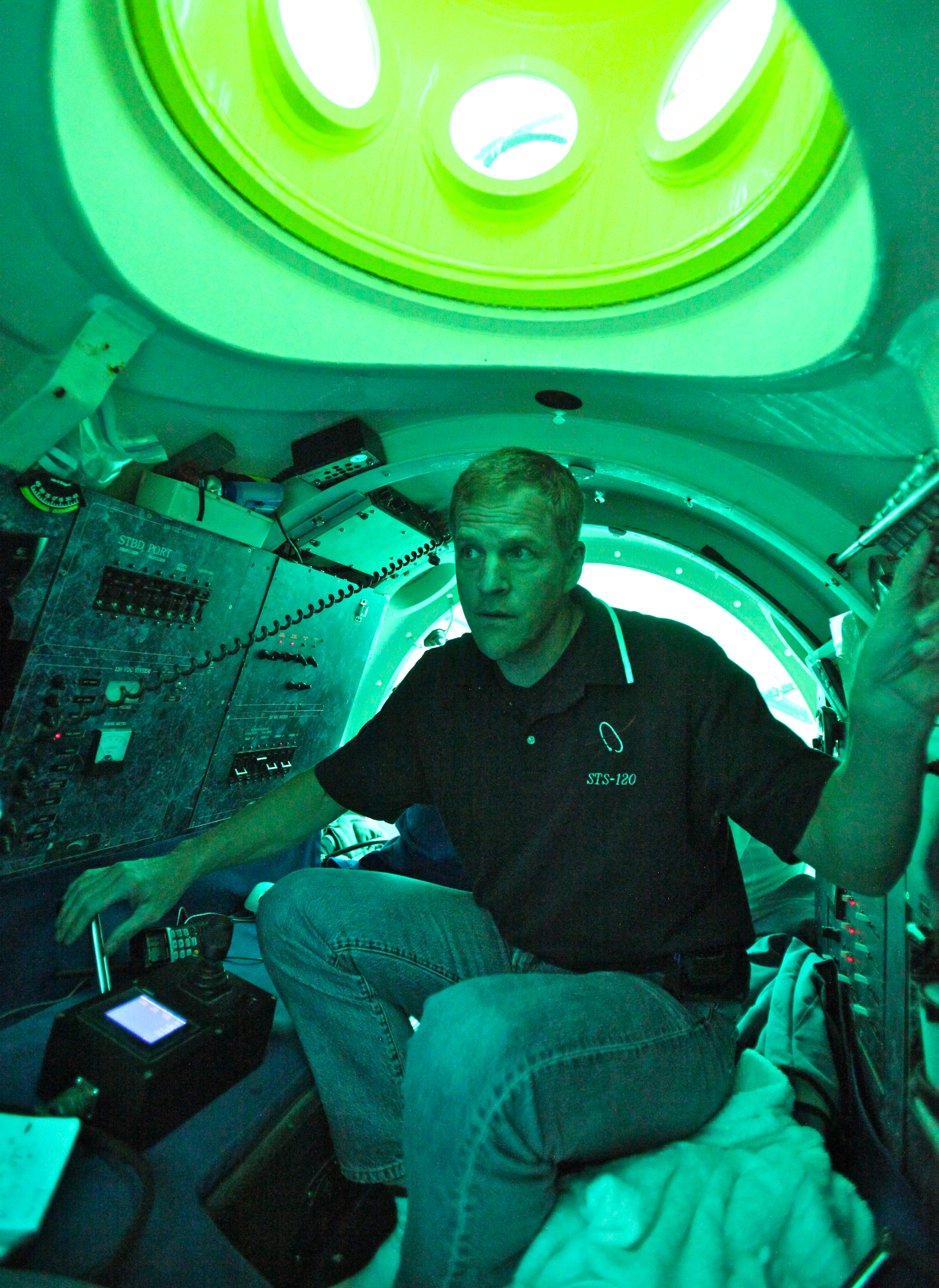
Astronaut Scott Parazynski aboard Antipodes

=== Origins ===
Antipodes started as the PC-1501 submersible originally built in 1973 by the Perry Submarine Company as a diver lock-out vehicle, similar in concept to Deep Diver (1966). It spent several years operating in the North Sea oil fields as a ferry for commercial divers.

In 1988, Hoffmann Yacht Sales purchased PC-1501 and hired Marlin Submarines in 1994 to manage the conversion of the craft. The pilot compartment from PC-1501 was reused and modified by installing domed, 58 in-diameter (150 cm) windows encompassing a 150° arc and window seat forgings at each end of the hull. The conning tower was fitted with seven 8 in (200 mm) windows with a conical frustum cross-section. The modified hull and battery pods were pressure tested to 1,250 ft (380 m) and certified to American Bureau of Shipping (ABS) standards; ABS surveyors attended the tests and certification dives.

When the modifications were completed in 1997, the submersible was renamed XPC15 and adapted for private recreational use with a dive time of three hours and a depth rating of 300 m (1,000 ft). It was installed and operated around the world aboard the Mystere, a 200-foot yacht.

=== New Zealand operation ===
In 1999, Submarine Adventures Ltd purchased the XPC-1501 and refitted it in Fort Lauderdale, Florida and in Dunedin, New Zealand to extend its working capabilities and renamed it the Antipodes. All systems were redesigned with tourism and research in mind.

The Antipodes had a maximum depth rating of 1,000 ft (305 m) and an extended bottom time to allow a maximum of eight tourist dives per day, each dive lasting a maximum of 60 minutes. The 1999 refit included installation of two battery pods for greater power capacity, modifications to the propulsion system for improved maneuverability, and upgrades to the life support systems to provide life support for five people for 72 hours. The Antipodes achieved a Certificate of Classification as a +A1 Manned Submersible from the American Bureau of Shipping on 12 February 2002.

The Antipodes submersible and its support barge were based beside the Milford Sound Underwater Observatory in Harrison Cove, Milford Sound, New Zealand. Harrison Cove is in the Piopiotahi Marine Reserve. Regular research and tourist dives were undertaken in the vicinity of Harrison Cove and nearby Williamston Point from 2002 to 2003. The Antipodes also undertook dives in Lake Wakatipu, near Queenstown, New Zealand.

=== OceanGate operation ===
Antipodes was offered for sale by Hoffman for US$295,000. In 2009, Antipodes was purchased by OceanGate, a commercial submersible operating company based in Everett, Washington, US.

In August 2018, OceanGate listed Antipodes for sale.
