= Guillermo Söhnlein =

Argentine businessperson

- Born: 18 May 1966 (age 60); Buenos Aires, Argentina
- Education: University of California, Berkeley; University of California Hastings College of the Law
- Occupation: Social entrepreneur
- Known for: co-founder of OceanGate

Guillermo Söhnlein (born May 18, 1966) is an Argentine-American businessman, best known as the co-founder of deep-sea exploration company OceanGate. Söhnlein left the company in 2013, retaining a minority stake.

== Professional career ==
In 1998, Söhnlein co-founded Milo, a speech recognition technology company that was acquired by Voxeo in 2001.

After relocating to the Northern Virginia region outside Washington, D.C., he worked with a number of technology startup ventures, and advised several technology-related investment groups, incubators, and economic development agencies, and gave frequent talks about the field.

== Space commercialization ventures ==
In 2003, Söhnlein founded the International Association of Space Entrepreneurs (IASE), which was a nonprofit organization created to encourage successful entrepreneurs from other industries to start aerospace-related ventures and start-ups. The group grew from 5 people to almost 1,500 individuals around the world. In 2010, the online community was transferred to the Space Frontier Foundation for ongoing growth, and IASE officially disbanded.

In 2006, he founded Space Angels Network, a for-profit angel investor group for early-stage aerospace ventures.

=== Venusian colony project ===
Söhnlein founded the Humans2Venus Foundation in January 2020 with entrepreneur Khalid Al-Ali.

SFF planned sending thousands people above floating city on Venus around 2050. Söhnlein explained to The Independent "that [Venus's] inhospitable surface, which is around 864 degrees Fahrenheit (462 degrees Celsius), should not be an issue if humans simply build a home 50km in its air where conditions are reportedly similar to those on the Earth."

== Ocean exploration ventures ==
In 2009, Söhnlein co-founded OceanGate with Stockton Rush, a venture that provided deep-sea crewed submersibles. On September 23, 2024, Söhnlein was interviewed by the United States Coast Guard Marine Board of Investigation regarding the Titan submersible implosion.

In 2010, he re-launched the Ocean Exploration Committee of the Marine Technology Society, a nonprofit membership association supporting students and industry professionals in marine-related fields.

In 2013, he founded Blue Marble Exploration, which organized high-profile expeditions to explore the oceans in crewed submersibles.

== Sea-Space Connections ==
In 2011, Söhnlein founded the Sea-Space Initiative, a global project to provide collaboration in ocean and space industries. The first program, launched in May 2012, is the Sea-Space Summit, a global series of invitation-only workshops.
