= Stockton Rush =

American businessman (1962–2023)

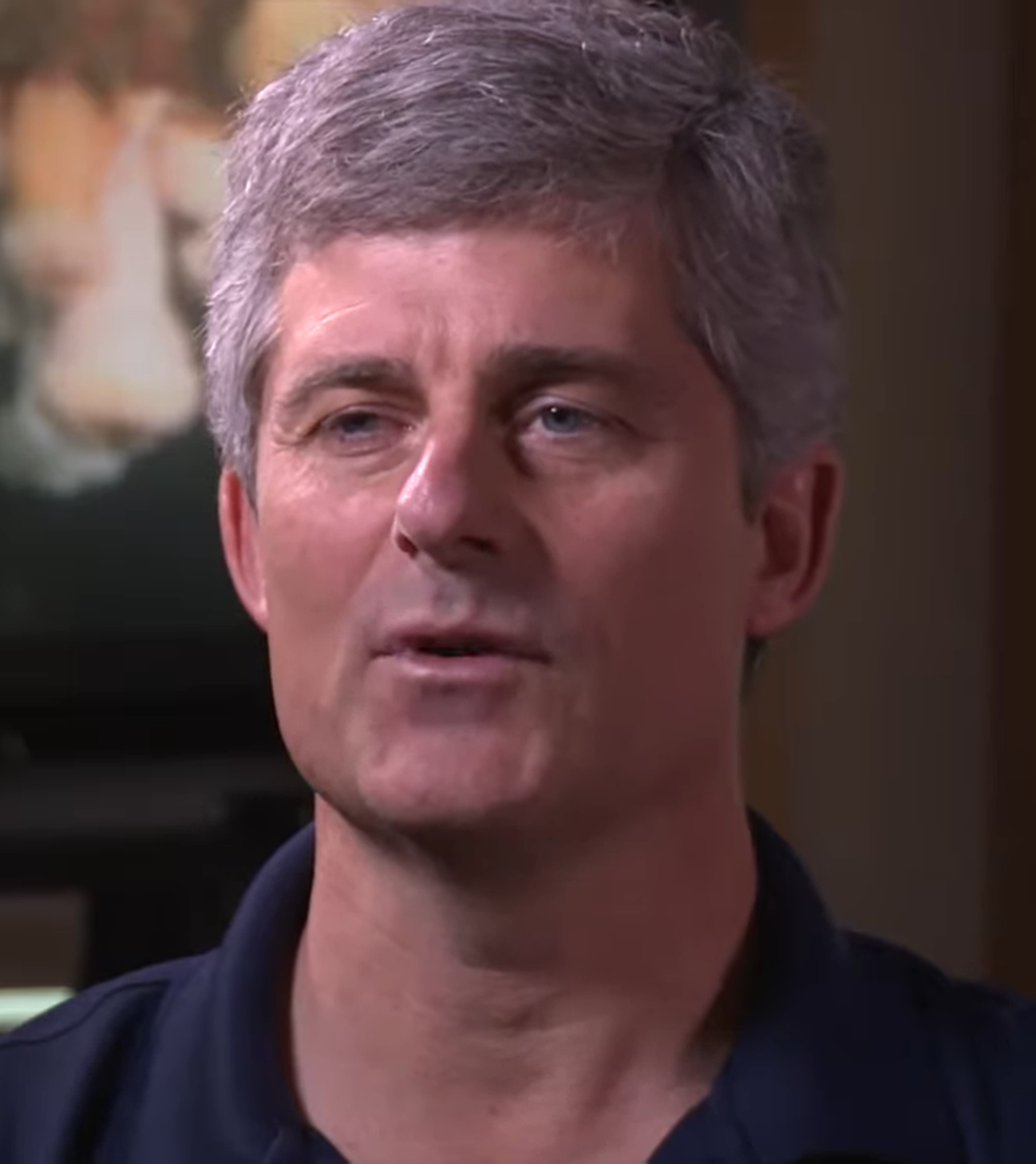
- Rush in 2015
- Born: Richard Stockton Rush III; March 31, 1962; San Francisco, California, U.S.
- Died: June 18, 2023 (aged 61); North Atlantic Ocean
- Cause of death: Implosion of Titan submersible
- Education: Princeton University (BSE); University of California, Berkeley (MBA)
- Occupation: Businessman
- Title: Co-founder and CEO of OceanGate
- Term: 2009–2023
- Spouse: Wendy Weil (m. 1986)
- Children: 2
- Relatives: Ralph K. Davies (grandfather)
- Stockton Rush's voice On the benefits of oceanic exploration Recorded March 2015

Richard Stockton Rush III (March 31, 1962 – June 18, 2023) was an American businessman who was the co-founder and chief executive officer of OceanGate, a deep-sea exploration company.

After graduation from Princeton University, Rush worked for McDonnell Douglas as a flight test engineer on their F-15 program. He later was a board member for BlueView Technologies and the Museum of Flight. In 2009, he created the company OceanGate with Guillermo Söhnlein, who departed the company in 2013.

On June 18, 2023, Rush died along with four others when OceanGate's submersible Titan imploded during an attempt to visit the wreck of the Titanic. A report by the U.S. Coast Guard dated August 4, 2025, found that Rush "exhibited negligence" contributing to the deaths and could have been found criminally liable, had he not died.

== Early life ==
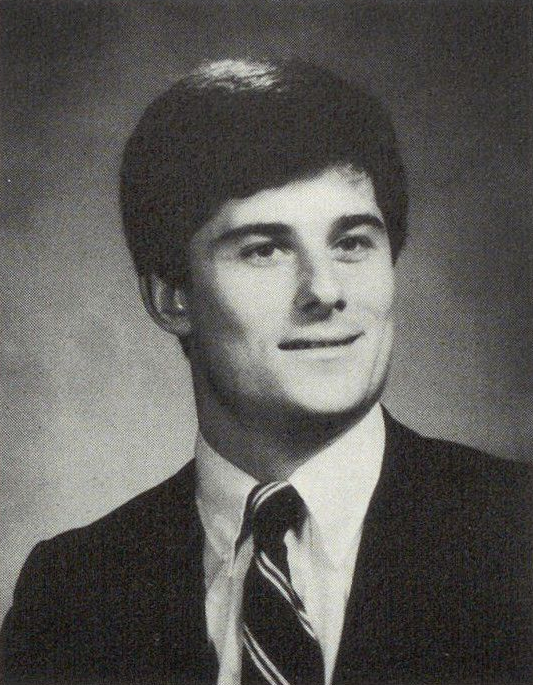
Rush in the Princeton University yearbook, 1984

Richard Stockton Rush III was born on March 31, 1962, into a wealthy family in San Francisco, California, the youngest of five children born to Richard Stockton Rush Jr. and Ellen (née Davies). His mother was a native of San Francisco, while his father was born in Philadelphia. His maternal grandfather was businessman Ralph K. Davies. His maternal grandmother, Louise Davies, was a philanthropist and the namesake of San Francisco's Louise M. Davies Symphony Hall. Through his father, he was a descendant of two signers of the Declaration of Independence, Richard Stockton and physician Benjamin Rush.

As a child, Rush wanted to become an astronaut and the first person on Mars, and had an interest in aviation and aquatics. He began scuba diving at age 12, and became a commercial pilot at 18 years old. He was later told his visual acuity would disqualify him from becoming a military aviator. In 1980, he graduated from Phillips Exeter Academy in Exeter, New Hampshire.

Rush received a Bachelor of Science in Engineering degree with a major in aerospace engineering from Princeton University in 1984 and a Master of Business Administration from the University of California, Berkeley in 1989.

== Career ==
After graduating from Princeton, Rush worked briefly for McDonnell Douglas as a flight-test engineer for the F-15 program before getting his MBA. Later on, Rush worked as a venture capitalist for the San Francisco company Peregrine Partners. He relocated to the Pacific Northwest in 1989 to manage the company Remote Control Technology based in Kirkland, Washington. He claimed to have built an experimental airplane later that year that he flew throughout his life.

Rush was a hobbyist scuba diver and spent time diving in the waters of Puget Sound. In 2006, after his first excursion in a submarine in British Columbia, Rush became interested in ocean exploration at lower depths. Rush began considering purchasing a submersible but discovered there were fewer than 100 privately owned submarines worldwide and was unable to purchase one. Instead, a company in London offered to sell parts for a miniature submersible that could be assembled using blueprints reportedly created by a retired U.S. Navy submarine commander. The vessel Rush constructed was 4 metres (13 ft) long and capable of diving to a depth of 10 metres (33 ft). After the construction of his miniature submersible he continued to try to purchase a submersible, including attempting to buy Steve Fossett's submersible vehicle after Fossett's 2007 death, but was unsuccessful.

Around 2007, Rush began to explore the idea of founding his own submarine company. He believed that there could be significant market for underwater ocean tourism and that it would provide an alternative to the significant time and technical gear required for scuba diving. Rush founded OceanGate with business partner Guillermo Söhnlein in 2009. According to Rush, the goal of the company was to use commercial tourism to fund the development of new deep-diving submersibles that would enable further commercial ventures including resource mining and disaster mitigation. Söhnlein left OceanGate in 2013.

While performing market research for OceanGate, Rush determined that the private market for underwater exploration had floundered due to a public reputation for danger and increased regulatory requirements for the operation of tourist submarines and submersibles. He believed these reasons were "understandable but illogical", and that the perception of danger much exceeded the actual risk. In particular, he was critical of the Passenger Vessel Safety Act of 1993, a United States law which regulated the construction of ocean tourism vessels and prohibited dives below 150 feet (46 m), which Rush described as a law which "needlessly prioritized passenger safety over commercial innovation".

In 2016, exploring the sunken Andrea Doria on the Cyclops I, David Lochridge reported how Rush "smashed straight down" into the wreckage of the sunken ocean liner, an episode recounted during a Coast Guard hearing in 2024.

In 2018, Rush piloted an expedition with researchers and scientists in the San Juan Islands to observe the red sea urchin and the habitat of the sand lance. In 2021, after several delays, Rush finally started his deep submergence business. Prior to the June 2023 dive, Rush was sued for $210,000 by a couple in Florida concerning a planned 2018 dive to the Titanic that they claim was repeatedly canceled and postponed. The couple claimed that they were unable to get a refund due to Rush's actions. After Rush's death, the couple dropped the lawsuit out of respect for the lives lost on the Titan.

In a 2022 podcast with CBS reporter David Pogue, Rush discussed his views on the balance between risk and safety:

You know, at some point, safety just is pure waste. I mean, if you just want to be safe, don't get out of bed, don't get in your car, don't do anything. At some point, you're going to take some risk, and it really is a risk/reward question. I think I can do this just as safely by breaking the rules.

== Personal life ==
Rush married pilot and teacher Wendy Weil in 1986, and they had two children. Rush and Weil both attended Princeton University, where they met. Weil is the great-great-granddaughter of Isidor and Ida Blun Straus, both of whom died in the sinking of the Titanic. She was the Director of Communications at OceanGate.

Rush became a commercial pilot at age 18 and claimed to have become the youngest jet transport-rated pilot in the world at age 19 in 1981. In 1989, he built a Glasair III experimental aircraft, which he continued to own and fly throughout his life. Rush was also a lifelong scuba diving enthusiast, having begun diving at age 12.

== Titan expedition and death ==
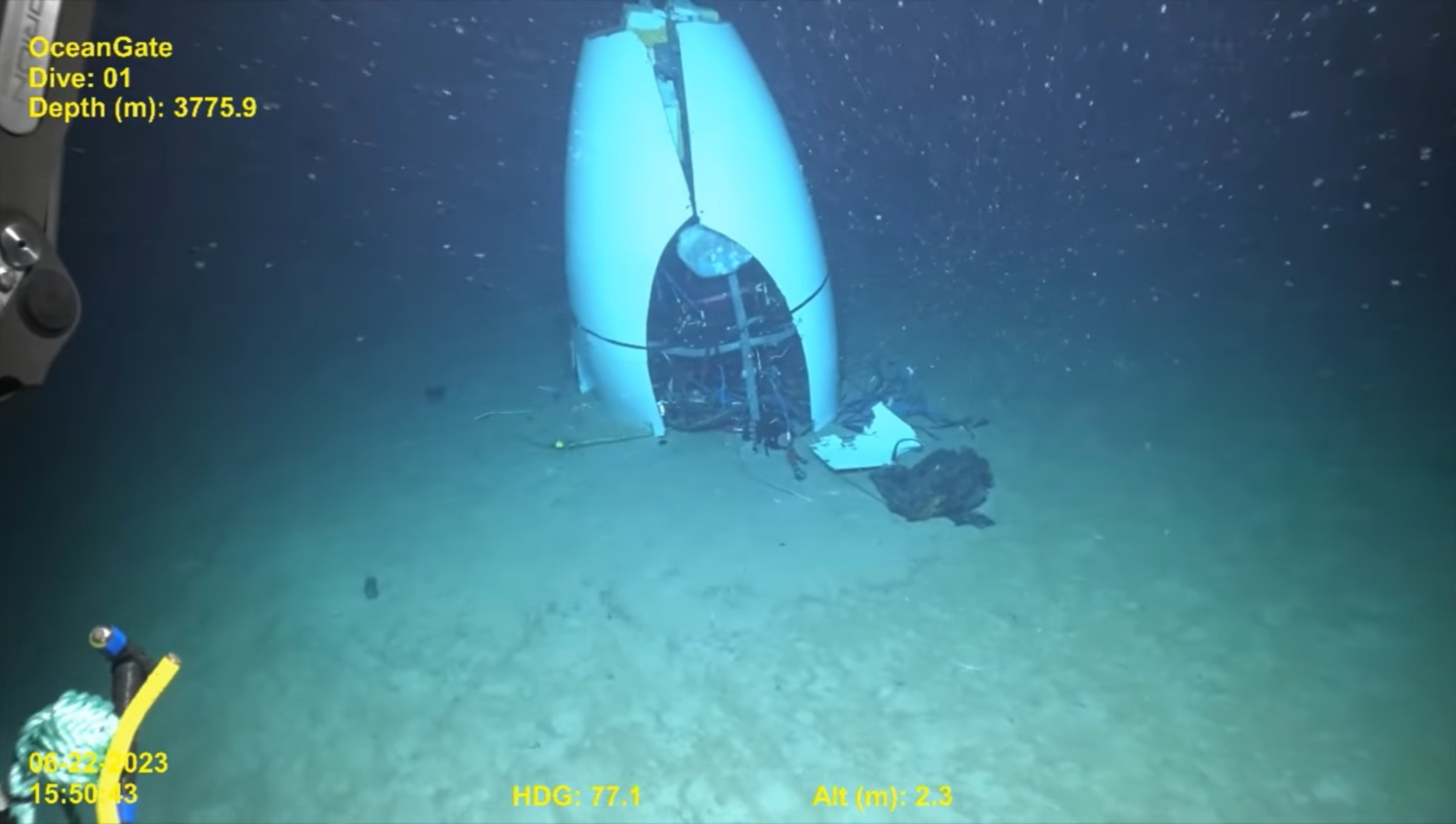
Wreckage of Titan on the ocean floor, 22 June 2023

Rush was in the Titan, a submersible owned and designed by OceanGate, to view the wreck of the Titanic when the vessel lost contact with the surface ship MV Polar Prince on June 18, 2023. Search and rescue missions involved water and air support from the United States, Canada, and France.

On June 22, after the discovery of a debris field approximately 490 metres (1,600 ft) from the bow of the Titanic, OceanGate said it believed Rush and the four others aboard had died. A United States Coast Guard press conference later confirmed that the debris found was consistent with a catastrophic loss of the pressure hull, an implosion, resulting in the instantaneous deaths of all aboard.

== See also ==
- List of inventors killed by their own invention
- List of solved missing person cases (2020s)
