= Marine Investigation (USCG) =

US organization that carries out statutorily mandated investigations

USCG Marine Investigators carry out all the statutorily mandated investigations of commercial vessel casualties and reports of violation that require a determination for apparent cause and culpability (fault). The findings of Coast Guard Marine Casualty Investigations are used to create safety recommendations to prevent future marine casualties.

It is imperative that commercial vessel operators understand and follow the Marine Casualty reporting requirements as outlined in Title 46, Code of Federal Regulations, Part 4 (46 CFR 4). Without timely and truthful reporting, the Coast Guard is hampered in its ability to conduct an accurate investigation. Therefore, responsible parties that fail to report Marine Casualties as required by regulations are subject to civil penalties.

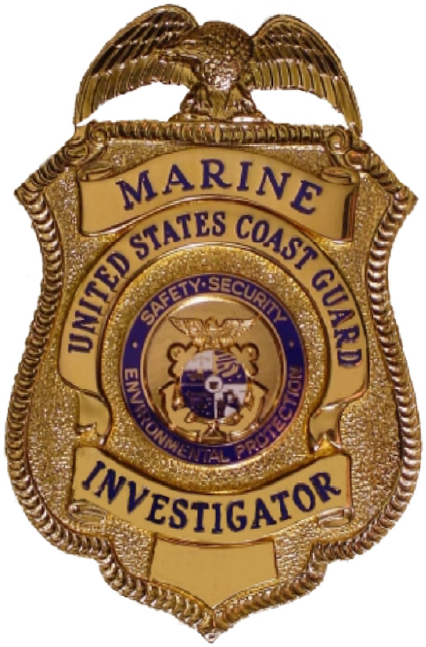
Coast Guard Marine Investigator Badge

U.S. law, specifically Title 46, U.S. Code, Chapter 61 (Reporting Marine Casualties), Chapter 63 (Investigating Marine Casualties), and Chapter 77 (Suspension and Revocation) provide the core concepts governing the Coast Guard's responsibilities for Marine Casualties and Personnel Actions. The statutes, as written, are broad in nature and are supplemented by more extensive regulatory requirements set forth in Title 46, Code of Federal Regulations, Part 4 (Marine Casualties and Investigations) and Title 46, Code of Federal Regulations, Part 5 (Marine Investigation Regulations - Personnel Actions).

The primary purpose of an investigation is to ascertain the cause or causes of an accident, casualty, or personnel behaviors to determine if remedial measures should be taken and to determine whether any violation of Federal Law or Regulation has occurred. The U.S. Coast Guard does not conduct investigations to determine Civil Liability in disputes between private litigants. Rather, our investigations are a means to promote safety of life and property at sea and to protect the Marine Environment. The Investigations Division conducts investigations for Vessel Casualties or Accidents, Violations of Statutes the U.S. Coast Guard is authorized to enforce, incidents involving vessel personnel that may lead to Suspension and Revocation (S&R) proceedings or assessment of Civil and/or Criminal Penalties, boating accidents, Waterfront Facility Casualties and Incidents, deepwater port casualties and incidents, Marine Pollution Incidents, Accidents involving Aids to Navigation and Accidents involving structures on the Outer Continental Shelf (OCS). The results of such investigations play a major role in changing current and developing new laws and regulations, as well as implementing new technologies in areas of U.S. Coast Guard concern.

== Marine Casualty or Incident reporting forms ==
Marine casualty or Incident Should be reported in the writing within 5 days in the following form:

- (CG-2692) Report of Marine Casualty, Commercial Diving Casualty, or OSC-Related Casualty
- (CG-2692A) Barge Addendum
- (CG-2692B) Report of Required Chemical Drug and Alcohol Testing Following a Serious Marine
- (CG-2692C) Personnel Casualty Addendum
- (CG-2692D) Involved Persons and Witnesses Addendum

In addition, USCG Marine Investigators are tasked with investigating reports of negligence, misconduct, or other violations of federal laws or regulations that occur in conjunction with the operation of commercial vessels. If a merchant mariner is found to be in violation the USCG Marine Investigator pursues enforcement action to prevent future deficiencies and non-compliance by issuing Letters of Warning and Notices of Violations, initiating Administrative Civil Penalty hearings, initiating suspension and revocation proceedings against Coast Guard issued credentials, and representing the Coast Guard at suspension and revocation hearings.

== Marine Casualty and Pollution Data for Researchers ==
The Marine Casualty and Pollution Data files provide details about marine casualty and pollution incidents investigated by Coast Guard Offices throughout the United States. The database can be used to analyze marine accidents and pollution incidents by a variety of factors including vessel or facility type, injuries, fatalities, pollutant details, location, and date. The data collection period began in 1982 for marine casualties and 1973 for polluting incidents, and is ongoing. Documentation includes entity and attribute descriptions along with suggested solutions to general marine pollution, vessel casualty, and personnel injury and death questions.

== Organization ==
=== Office of Investigations & Casualty Analysis (CG-INV) ===
The Office of Investigations & Casualty Analysis (CG-INV) reports to the Director of Inspections & Compliance (CG-5PC) and is located at the U.S. Coast Guard Headquarters building in Washington D.C.. The office is divided into three divisions: Investigations Division (CG-INV-1), Compliance Analysis Division (CG-INV-2) and Data Administration & FOIA Division (CG-INV-3) and has three further reporting divisions being the Investigations National Center of Expertise, based in New Orleans, Suspension & Revocation National Center of Expertise, based in Martinsburg, West Virginia and the Marine Safety Lab, based in New London, Connecticut

=== Marine Board of Investigation ===
The division supports Coast Guard Marine Board of Investigation (MBI) which are the highest level enquiry convened by the Commandant of the Coast Guard for the most serious accidents or those with considerable national significance.

== Mission ==
We lead Coast Guard's investigation program to promote safety, protect the environment, and to prevent future accidents.

== Day-to-Day Activities and Key Processes ==
- Manage marine casualty and pollution investigation programs.
- Manage pollution notice of violation program.
- Manage violation investigations; adjudicated by Hearing Officer.
- Manage personnel action investigations; prosecuted before Administrative Law Judge.
- Conduct administrative clemency boards.
- Manage drug and alcohol testing program.
- Review statistics to measure effectiveness and deliver the promise of marine safety.
- Support field in all of the above policy issues.
