= OceanGate =

American crewed-submersible company

OceanGate Inc.

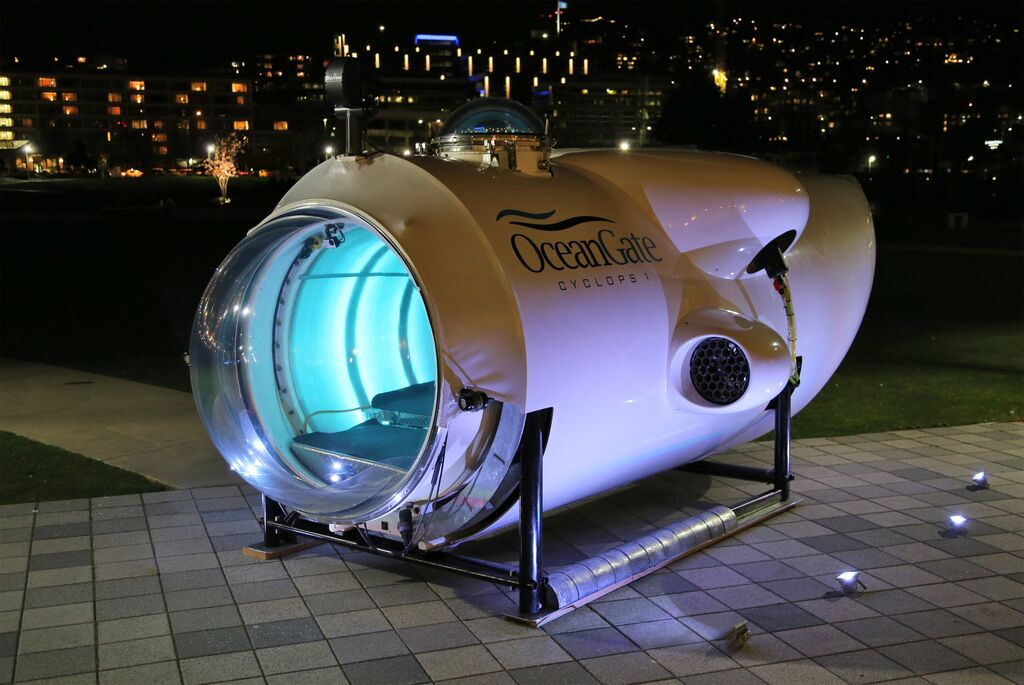
- Cyclops 1 submersible on display at Seattle's Museum of History & Industry
- Type: Private
- Industry: Tourism, expeditions, underwater diving
- Founded: 2009; 17 years ago
- Founders: Stockton Rush: Guillermo Söhnlein
- Headquarters: Everett, Washington, U.S.
- Key people: Stockton Rush (CEO, 2009–June 2023); Gordon Gardiner (CEO, August 2023–present)
- Website: oceangate.com Archived June 21, 2023, at the Wayback Machine

OceanGate Inc. is an American privately owned company based in Everett, Washington, that provided crewed submersibles for tourism, industry, research, and exploration. The company was founded in 2009 by Stockton Rush and Guillermo Söhnlein.

The company acquired a submersible vessel, Antipodes, and later built two of its own: Cyclops 1 and Titan. In 2021, OceanGate began taking paying tourists in Titan to visit the wreck of the Titanic. In 2022, the price to be a passenger on an OceanGate expedition to the Titanic shipwreck was $250,000 per person.

On June 18, 2023, Titan imploded during a voyage to the Titanic wreck site, killing all five occupants on board, including the company's CEO. An international search and rescue operation was launched, and on June 22 the wreckage was found on the seabed about 500 meters (1,600 ft) from the Titanic wreck site. Although OceanGate claimed to have “partnered with aerospace experts at the University of Washington, NASA and Boeing on the design of our hull,” all three denied any part in Titan’s design or construction in the wake of the loss of the submersible.

On June 21, 2023, it was announced that OceanGate's Everett office was closed indefinitely, and on July 6, 2023, OceanGate suspended all operations. Since August 2023, Gordon Gardiner has served as the company's CEO. Gardiner was appointed "to lead OceanGate through the ongoing investigations and closure of the company's operations," as the company still exists as a legal entity; however, Gardiner has stated that OceanGate has "permanently" ceased all business operations.

== Background ==
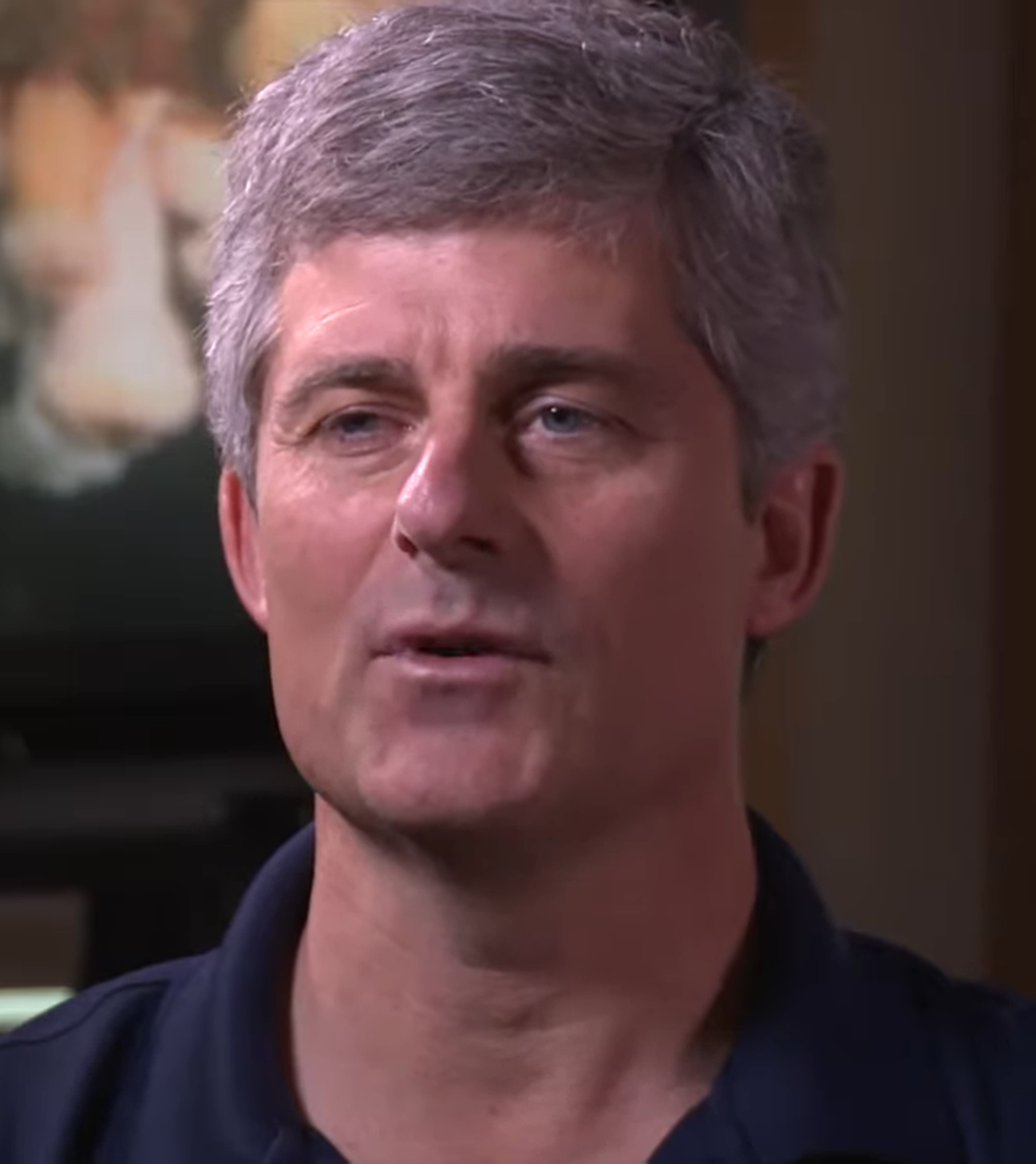
Stockton Rush, CEO and co-founder

Stockton Rush had an interest in aviation and space travel as a child, and obtained a commercial pilot's license when he was 18 years old. As an adult, his interests pivoted to undersea exploration. Rush built a fortune by investing his inheritance in technological businesses and decided to purchase a submarine, but discovered that he was unable to, as there were fewer than 100 privately owned submarines worldwide. He instead built one from plans in 2006, a Kittredge K-350, which he named Suds.

Rush believed that undersea exploration was an underserved market, due to, in his opinion, an unwarranted reputation of submersibles as dangerous vehicles. He criticized the Passenger Vessel Safety Act of 1993 as "needlessly prioritiz[ing] passenger safety over commercial innovation". In an address before The Explorers Club in 2017, he termed submersibles "the safest vehicles on the planet". Non-certified vehicles were more dangerous, as demonstrated by at least one fatality involving a homemade submersible in 1990.

Rush commissioned a marketing study that concluded there was sufficient demand for underwater ocean tourism.

== History ==
=== 2009–2013: Founding and acquisition of Antipodes ===
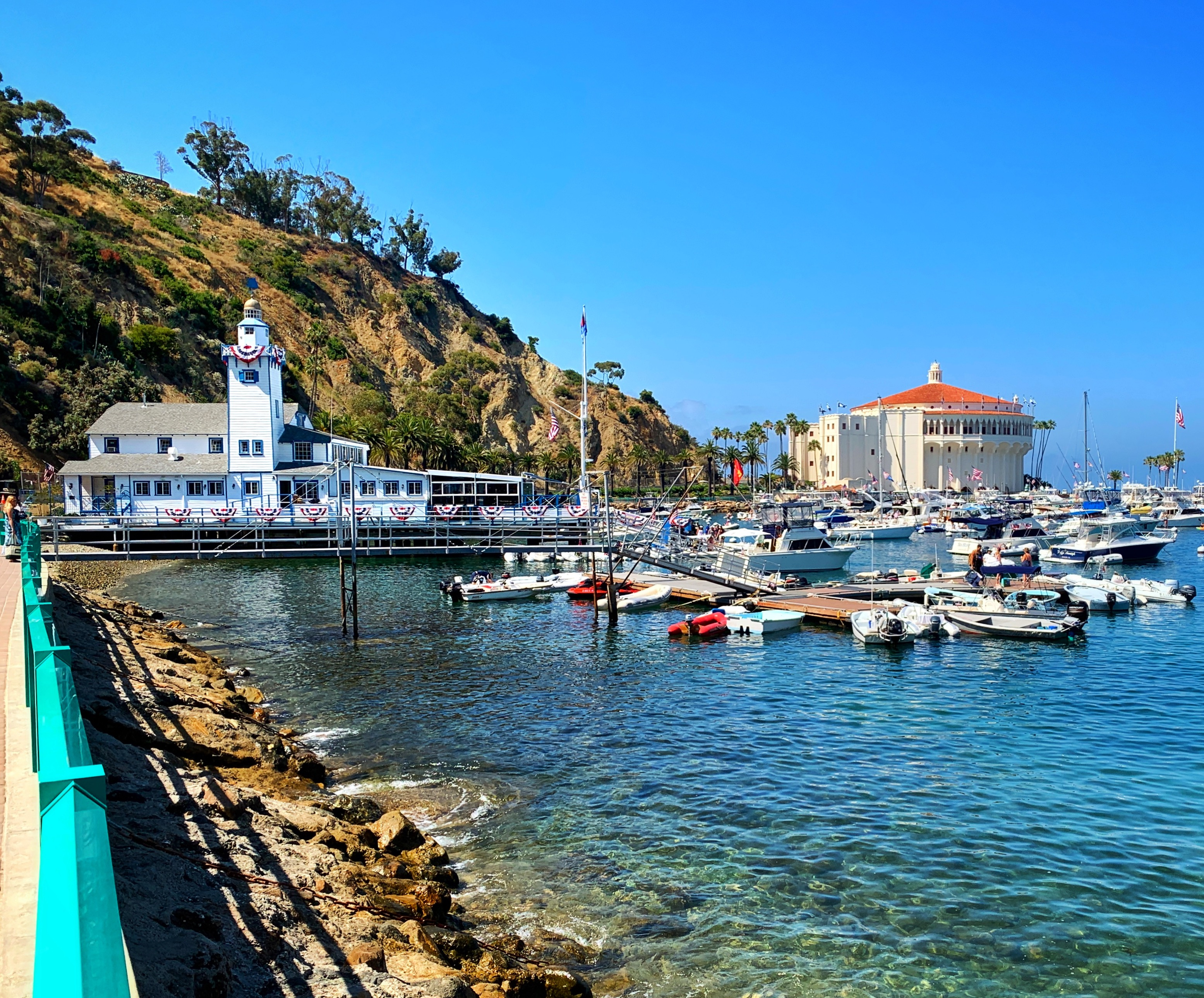
Catalina Island was the first location of OceanGate's tourist expeditions.

OceanGate was initiated by Guillermo Söhnlein and Stockton Rush in Seattle in 2009. According to Söhnlein, the company was founded with the intention of creating a small fleet of 5-person commercial submersibles that could be leased by any organization or group of individuals. In 2023 he told Sky News, "The whole intent was to create a small fleet of work submersibles. And in that way, as our tagline was in the early days, 'Open the oceans for all of humanity'."

The company's first submersible was Antipodes, a used 5-person vessel with a steel hull. Between 2010 and 2013 the company performed an estimated 130 dives with Antipodes. The company's business model involved renting out its submersible to researchers, and taking tourists—whom the company referred to as "citizen scientists"—on underwater excursions. Söhnlein estimated in 2012 that passengers typically paid between $7,500 and $40,000 per person, depending on the excursion.

OceanGate's first tourist excursion was conducted in 2010 when the company began transporting paying customers. The company took tourist groups to Catalina Island off the coast of California. To improve the experience, the company began bringing expert guides aboard the dives. According to Rush, "People would ask me about a fish, and I wouldn't know anything about it." The company first included marine biologists as expert guides and, according to Rush, "The difference was night and day. Their excitement permeated the sub."

In 2010, OceanGate worked with the University of Washington for the first time. The university utilized Antipodes to perform trials of novel sonar equipment and robotic arms. The following year, Antipodes was used to survey and map the wreckage of the SS Governor, a ship that had sunk in Puget Sound in 1921.

In 2012 and 2013, OceanGate operated for a year in Miami, Florida. Collaborating with Miami-Dade Artificial Reefs Program, researchers aboard Antipodes investigated the spread of lionfish.

=== 2013–2016: Construction of Cyclops and Söhnlein's departure ===
In 2013, the company began to design its own submersibles with unique designs that were allegedly cost effective. Söhnlein quit the company that same year, saying that OceanGate had transitioned from its initial phase to Rush's specialty of engineering. Söhnlein retained a minority stake.

OceanGate worked on the design of its first custom-built submersible Cyclops, later named Cyclops 1, in collaboration with the University of Washington and Boeing. The hull was planned to be a carbon fiber hull, but OceanGate instead acquired a 12-year-old vessel, Lula, from a company in the Azores. It extracted the cylindrical steel hull of the Lula and used it to create Cyclops 1. Cyclops was unveiled in 2015. The same year, the company relocated its headquarters to the Port of Everett's Waterfront Center office space in Everett, Washington.

=== 2016–2023: Expansion of fleet and dives to the Titanic ===
OceanGate ordered the first titanium components for Cyclops 2 in December 2016, and let a contract to Spencer Composites in January 2017 to design and build the cylindrical carbon fiber hull. In March 2018, Cyclops 2 was renamed to Titan; Rush described it as "an amazing engineering feat" during its launch in 2018. Testing of Titan to its maximum intended depth of 4,000 m (13,000 ft) occurred in 2018 and 2019.

In 2019, OceanGate said they were planning to develop the successor submersibles Cyclops 3 and Cyclops 4 with a targeted maximum depth of 6,000 m (20,000 ft), and in early 2020 announced that the development and manufacturing of the hulls would be performed at NASA's Marshall Space Flight Center in Huntsville, Alabama. The submersibles would be funded by a new round of investments by "100% insiders" totaling $18.1 million, as announced in January 2020. NASA's participation was by a Space Act Agreement intended to further "deep-space exploration goals" and "improve materials and manufacturing for American industry" according to John Vickers. A NASA spokesperson stated in 2023 that NASA's Marshall Space Flight Center had a Space Act Agreement with OceanGate, but it "did not conduct testing and manufacturing via its workforce or facilities".

In spring 2020, during the COVID-19 pandemic, OceanGate applied for, and received, a PPP loan for approx. $450,000, based on 22 jobs.

In 2021 and 2022, OceanGate conducted dives to the Titanic aboard its submersible Titan.

=== 2023–present: Implosion of Titan, death of Rush, and suspension of operations ===
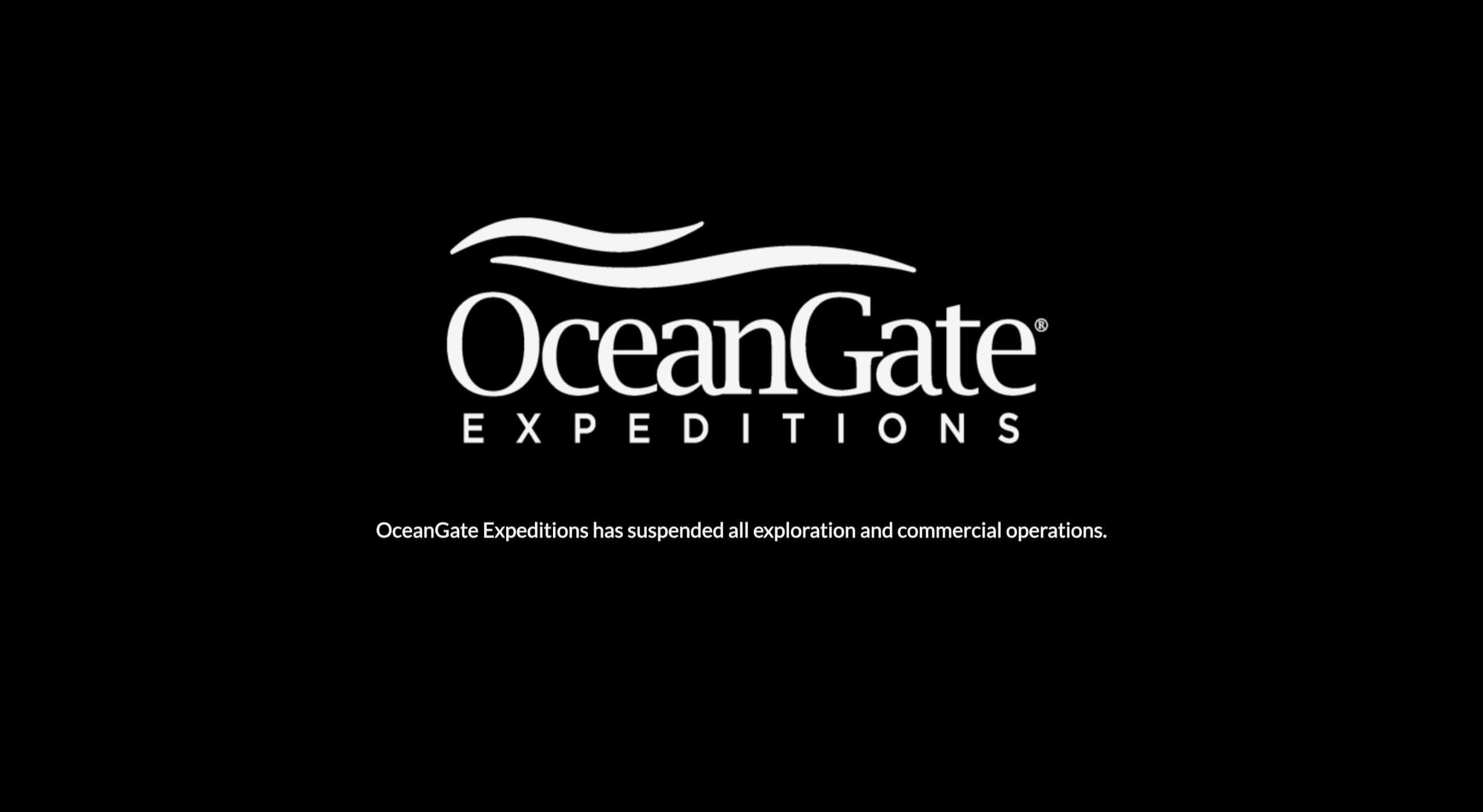
Screenshot of OceanGate Expeditions' website as of July 2023, indicating its suspension of all operations. A similar version that excluded the word "expeditions" was displayed on their primary website.

Titan imploded during an expedition to the Titanic in June 2023, killing all five occupants including CEO Stockton Rush. After a four-day search and rescue operation by an international team led by the United States Coast Guard, U.S. Navy, and Canadian Coast Guard, a debris field was discovered containing parts of Titan, about 500 metres (1,600 ft) from the bow of the Titanic.

Upon news of the fate of Titan, the company closed its Everett office indefinitely. Soon after the implosion, its subsidiary OceanGate Expeditions also suspended operations. In July 2023, OceanGate's websites defaulted to a message advising: "OceanGate has suspended all exploration and commercial operations."

== Submersibles ==
OceanGate owned three submersibles. The Cyclops 1 and Titan submersibles were launched and recovered from a dry dock-like "Launch and Recovery Platform" that could be towed behind a commercial vessel. Once the platform and submersible reached the target location, the platform's flotation tanks were flooded and it sank below the surface turbulence to a depth of 9 m (30 ft). The submersible then lifted off for its underwater mission. Upon the submersible's return to the platform, the flotation tanks were pumped out and the platform taken back into tow or brought aboard the host vessel. That allowed OceanGate to use vessels without human-rated cranes. The platform was approximately 11 m (35 ft) long and 4.6 m (15 ft) wide and could lift up to 9,100 kg (20,000 lb); it was based on a concept developed by the Hawaii Undersea Research Laboratory.

=== Antipodes ===
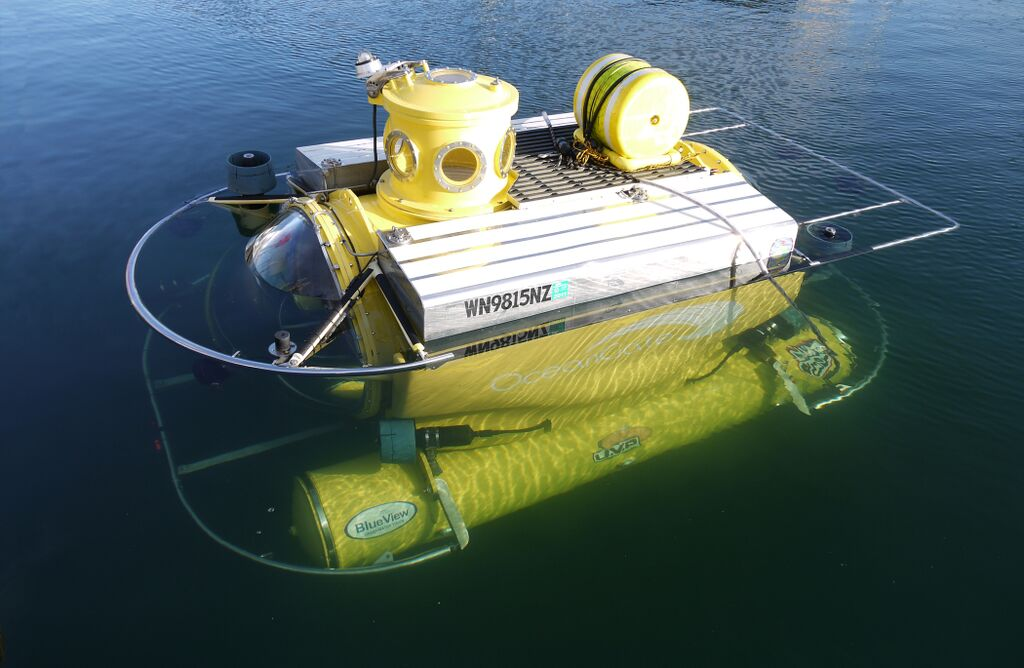
OceanGate submersible Antipodes

Antipodes is a steel-hulled submersible capable of reaching depths of 300 meters (1,000 ft), acquired by OceanGate in 2010. OceanGate transported its first paying customers in the vessel in 2010 off the coast of Catalina Island in California. The submersible was later contracted to expeditions to explore corals, lionfish populations in Florida, and a former oil rig in the Gulf of Mexico. By 2013 OceanGate had made over 130 dives with the vessel.

=== Cyclops 1 ===
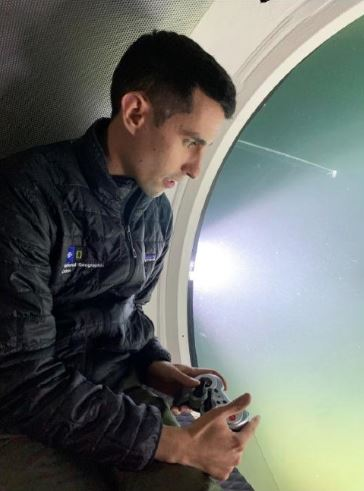
Trent Tresch pilots the Cyclops 1 using a modified Logitech F710 game controller.

In March 2015, OceanGate unveiled the Cyclops 1, a 5-person steel-hulled submersible capable of diving up to 500 meters (1,640 ft) under water. It measures approximately 6.7 m (22 feet) long and 2.7 m (9 feet) wide, and weighs about 9,100 kg (20,000 pounds). Its name was inspired by its strengthened acrylic window. The submersible is steered by a modified wireless game controller, and the vessel has a battery life of up to eight hours. The vessel has been used for various commercial and academic expeditions.

OceanGate created Cyclops 1 in collaboration with the University of Washington's Applied Physics Laboratory; Boeing worked with OceanGate and the University of Washington for initial design analysis. In the initial design, the hull was to be made of carbon fiber, but this idea was abandoned in favor of a steel hull. OceanGate acquired the steel hull for Cyclops 1 in 2013, after it had been used for 12 years, and fitted it with a new interior, underwater sensors, and gamepad pilot control system.

In June 2016, Cyclops 1 was used to survey the wreck of SS Andrea Doria 73 m (240 feet) below the surface. The survey data were intended to build a computer model of the wreck and its surroundings to improve navigation. In 2019 the craft was used to transport researchers to the bottom of Puget Sound to perform marine biology surveys.

=== Titan ===
Titan (known as Cyclops 2 until 2018) was the second submersible designed and built by OceanGate, the first privately owned submersible with an intended maximum depth of 4,000 m (13,000 ft). The viewport was rated to only 650 m (2,130 ft), and the engineer of the viewport also prepared an analysis from an independent expert that concluded the design would fail after only a few 4,000 m dives. It also was the first completed crewed submersible that used a hull constructed of titanium and carbon fiber composite materials, as most other human-carrying submersibles are designed with an all-metal pressure vessel. It was designed and developed originally in partnership with UW and Boeing, both of which put forth numerous design recommendations and rigorous testing requirements, which Rush ignored, despite prior tests at lower depths resulting in implosions at UW's lab. The partnerships dissolved as Rush refused to work within quality standards. A new hull was built in 2021 after the original had cracked after 50 dives, just three of which reached 4,000 m. The new submersible salvaged and reused parts from the failed submersible, and added lifting rings against the advice of engineers, who stated that the Titan could not handle any tension or load.

On June 18, 2023, OceanGate lost contact with Titan during its dive to the Titanic. Loss of contact had occurred multiple times during previous test and tour dives, so OceanGate did not alert authorities until the submersible was overdue for its return. A massive international search and rescue operation ensued and ended on June 22, 2023, when debris from Titan was discovered about 500 meters (1,600 ft) in front of the bow of Titanic, revealing that the submersible had imploded catastrophically, killing all five occupants.

== Associated entities ==
At the time of Titan's implosion, OceanGate had three associated entities: its main headquarters in Everett, Washington; a subsidiary located in the Bahamas named Argus Expeditions Ltd (which trades as OceanGate Expeditions); and an independent nonprofit organization known as the OceanGate Foundation which provides financial support to scientists who participate in missions. Documents filed with the State of Washington list Stockton Rush as the treasurer of the nonprofit and his wife Wendy Rush as the director and president.

== See also ==
- Extreme tourism
- List of submarine and submersible incidents since 2000
