= Personal submarine =

Submarine intended primarily for private or recreational use

A personal submarine is a submarine, usually privately funded and constructed, which is usually primarily intended for recreational use.

Some are also used for scientific or military purposes.

Other uses include tourism, filming, water sporting, rescuing and spying. A wide range of them are available from one to over 34 occupants, some can go just 12 meters underwater, and some can even reach the bottom of the Mariana Trench.

Such submarines can be designed from scratch by the builder or built to available plans.

== Records ==
Timeline of deepest dive, solo, in a submarine, men
Date	Depth	Sub pilot	Sub	Notes
1985	914 metres (2,999 ft)	Graham Hawkes	Deep Rover	
6 March 2012	8,166 metres (26,791 ft)	James Cameron	Deepsea Challenger	
26 March 2012	10,898 metres (35,755 ft)	James Cameron	Deepsea Challenger	Dive to the deepest point on Earth, the Challenger Deep.

Timeline of deepest dive, solo, in a submarine, women
Date	Depth	Sub pilot	Sub	Notes
1986	1,000 metres (3,300 ft)	Sylvia Earle	Deep Rover	Tied record set by Graham Hawkes in the same sub.

== See also ==
Recreational submarines

- Alicia (submarine)
- DeepFlight Merlin and the first of the Merlin series, Necker Nymph
- DeepFlight Super Falcon
- K-250 Submarine

Other submersibles

- Diver propulsion vehicle
- Midget submarine
- Wet Nellie
- DeepFlight Super Falcon

Manufacturers and organizations

- Personal Submersibles Organization
- U-Boat Worx
- Triton Submarines
