= Submersible =

Small watercraft able to navigate under water

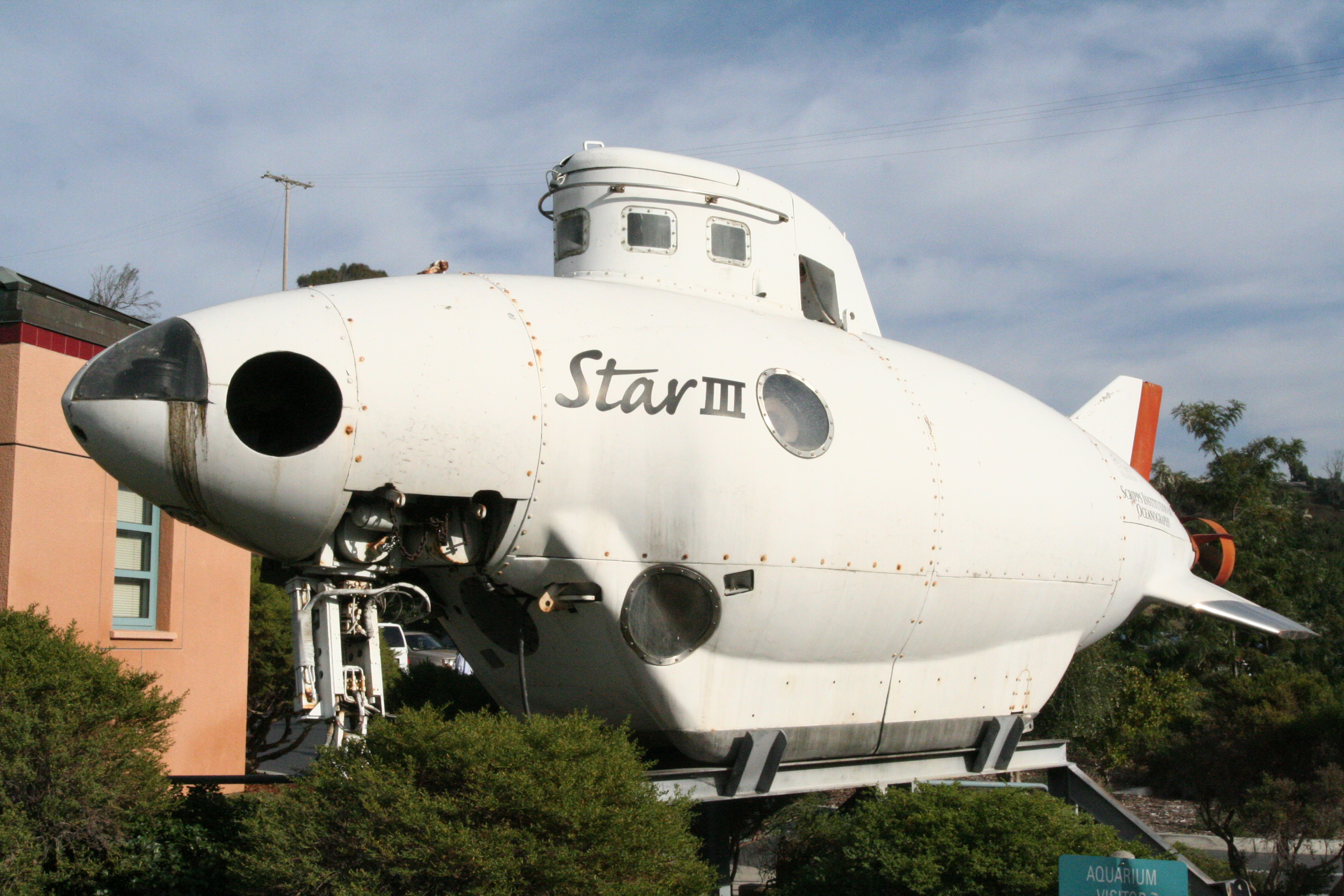
Retired modern submersible Star III of Scripps Institution of Oceanography

A submersible is an underwater vehicle which needs to be transported and supported by a larger watercraft or platform. This distinguishes submersibles from submarines, which are self-supporting and capable of prolonged independent operation at sea.

There are many types of submersibles, including both human-occupied vehicles (HOVs) and uncrewed craft, variously known as remotely operated vehicles (ROVs) or unmanned underwater vehicles (UUVs). Submersibles have many uses including oceanography, underwater archaeology, ocean exploration, tourism, equipment maintenance and recovery and underwater videography.

== History ==
The first recorded self-propelled underwater vessel was a small oar-powered submarine conceived by William Bourne (c. 1535 – 1582) and designed and built by Dutch inventor Cornelis Drebbel in 1620, with two more improved versions built in the following four years. Contemporary accounts state that the final model was demonstrated to King James I in person, who may even have been taken aboard for a test dive. There do not appear to have been any further recorded submersibles until Bushnell's Turtle.

The first submersible to be used in war was designed and built by American inventor David Bushnell in 1775 as a means to attach explosive charges to enemy ships during the American Revolutionary War. The device, dubbed Bushnell's Turtle, was an oval-shaped vessel of wood and brass. It had tanks that were filled with water to make it dive and then emptied with the help of a hand pump to make it return to the surface. The operator used two hand-cranked propellers to move vertically or laterally under the water. The vehicle had small glass windows on top to illuminate the sub during the day, and foxfire, wood infested with a naturally bioluminescent fungus, affixed to its barometer and compass so that they could be read in the dark.

Bushnell's Turtle was first set into action on September 7, 1776, at New York Harbor to attack the British flagship HMS Eagle. Sergeant Ezra Lee operated the vehicle at that time. Lee successfully brought Turtle against the underside of Eagle's hull but failed to attach the charge due to the hull being made of metal.

Manned submersibles are primarily used by special forces, which can use this type of vessel for a range of specialised missions.

== Operation ==
Apart from size, the main technical difference between a "submersible" and a "submarine" is that submersibles are not fully autonomous and may rely on a support facility or vessel for replenishment of power and breathing gases. Submersibles typically have shorter range, and operate primarily underwater, as most have little function at the surface. Some submersibles operate on a "tether" or "umbilical", remaining connected to a tender (a submarine, surface vessel or platform). Submersibles have been able to dive to full ocean depth, over 10 km (33,000 ft) below the surface.

A submersible often has very agile mobility, provided by marine thrusters or pump-jets, and may have reasonably dexterous crew operated manipulatory appendages.

== Technologies ==
Technologies used in the design and construction of submersibles:

- Buoyancy control
- Marine thrusters
- Pressure vessel with external pressure load
- Life support systems
- Through-water communications
- Manipulator arm
- Submarine navigation

Absolute pressure: At sea level the atmosphere exerts a pressure of approximately 1 bar, or 103,000 N/m^{2}. Underwater, the pressure increases by approximately 0.1 bar for every metre of depth. The total pressure at any given depth is the sum of the pressure of the water at that depth (hydrostatic pressure)and atmospheric pressure. This combined pressure is known as absolute pressure, and the relationship is:

Absolute pressure (bar abs) = gauge pressure(bar) + atmospheric pressure (about 1 bar)

To calculate absolute pressure, add the atmospheric pressure to the gauge pressure using the same unit. Working with depth rather than pressure may be convenient in diving calculations. In this context, atmospheric pressure is considered equivalent to a depth of 10 meters. Absolute depth (m) = gauge depth (m) + 10 m.

Depth measurement: Pressure monitoring devices

The pressure the is more important for structural and physiological reasons than linear depth. Pressure at a given depth may vary due to variations in water density.

To express the linear depth in water accurately, the measurement should be in meters (m). The unit "meters of sea water" (msw) is a by definition a unit for measurement of pressure.

Note: A change in depth of 10 meters for a change in pressure of 1 bar equates to a water density of 1012.72 kg/m^{3}

Single-atmosphere submersibles have a pressure hull with internal pressure maintained at surface atmospheric pressure. This requires the hull to be capable of withstanding the ambient hydrostatic pressure from the water outside, which can be many times greater than the internal pressure.

Ambient pressure submersibles maintain the same pressure both inside and outside the vessel. The interior is air-filled, at a pressure to balance the external pressure, so the hull does not have to withstand a pressure difference.

A third technology is the "wet sub", which refers to a vehicle that may or may not be enclosed, but in either case, water floods the interior, so underwater breathing equipment is used by the crew. This may be scuba carried by the divers, or a breathing gas supply carried by the vessel.

=== Buoyancy ===
When an object is immersed in a liquid, it displaces the liquid, pushing it out of the way.

Once the object is partially immersed, pressure forces exerted on the immersed parts are equal to the weight of water displaced, Consequently, objects submerged in liquids appear to weigh less due to this buoyant force. The relationship between the amount of liquid displaced and the resulting up-thrust is known as Archimedes' principle, which states:

"when an object is wholly or partially immersed in a liquid, the up-thrust it receives is equal to the weight of the liquid displaced."

Buoyancy and weight determine whether an object floats or sinks in a liquid. The relative magnitudes of weight and buoyancy determine the outcome, leading to three possible scenarios.

Negative buoyancy: when the weight of an object is greater than the up-thrust it experiences due to the weight of the liquid displaced, the object sinks.

Neutral buoyancy: if the weight of an object equals the up-thrust, the object remains stable in its current position, neither sinking or floating.

Positive buoyancy: when the weight of an object is less than the up-thrust, the object rises and floats. As it reaches the liquid's surface, It partly emerges from the liquid, reducing the weight of the displaced liquid and, consequently, the up-thrust. Eventually, the reduced up-thrust balances the weight of the object, allowing it to float in a state of equilibrium.

=== Buoyancy control ===
During underwater operation a submersible will generally be neutrally buoyant, but may use positive or negative buoyancy to facilitate vertical motion. Negative buoyancy may also be useful at times to settle the vessel on the bottom, and positive buoyancy is necessary to float the vessel at the surface. Fine buoyancy adjustments may be made using one or more variable buoyancy pressure vessels as trim tanks, and gross changes of buoyancy at or near the surface may use ambient pressure ballast tanks, which are fully flooded during underwater operations. Some submersibles use high density external ballast which may be released at depth in an emergency to make the vessel sufficiently buoyant to float back to the surface even if all power is lost, or to travel faster vertically.

== Deep-diving crewed submersibles ==
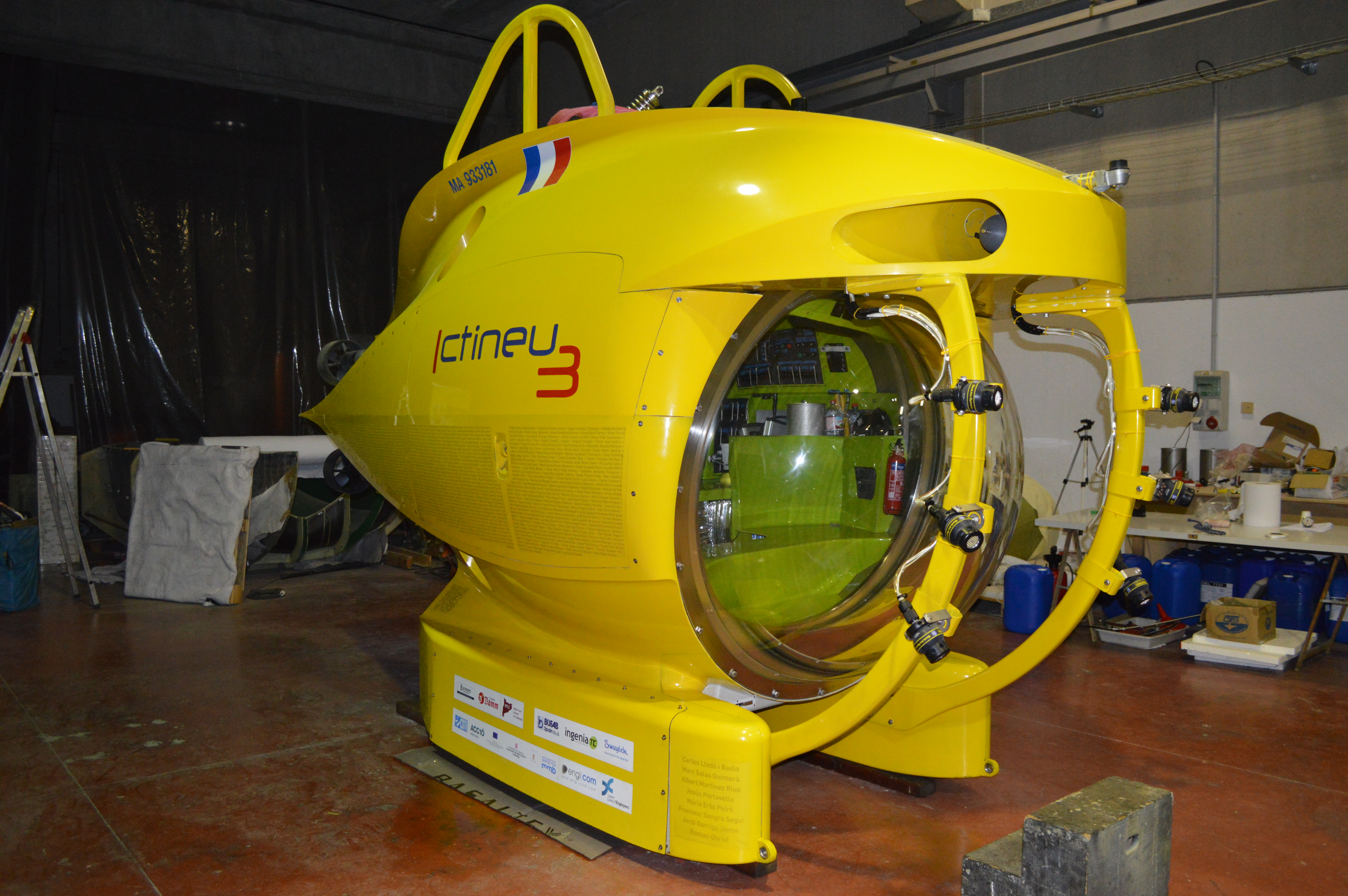
Ictineu 3 is a crewed submersible with a large semi-spheric acrylic glass viewport and is capable of reaching depths of 1,200 m (3,900 ft).

Some submersibles have been able to dive to great depths. The bathyscaphe Trieste was the first to reach the deepest part of the ocean, the Challenger Deep, nearly 11 km (36,000 ft) below the surface, at the bottom of the Mariana Trench in 1960.

China, with its Jiaolong project in 2002, was the fifth country to send a person 3,500 meters below sea level, following the US, France, Russia and Japan. On June 22, 2012, the Jiaolong submersible set a deep-diving record for state-owned vessels when the three-person sub descended 6,963 meters (22,844 ft) into the Pacific Ocean.

Among the most well-known and longest-in-operation submersibles is the deep-submergence research vessel DSV Alvin, which takes 3 people to depths of up to 4,500 metres (14,800 ft). Alvin is owned by the United States Navy and operated by WHOI, and as of 2011 had made over 4,400 dives.

James Cameron made a record-setting, crewed submersible dive to the bottom of Challenger Deep, the deepest known point of the Mariana Trench on March 26, 2012. Cameron's submersible was named Deepsea Challenger and reached a depth of 10,908 metres (35,787 ft).

DSV Limiting Factor, known as Bakunawa since its sale in 2022, is a crewed deep-submergence vehicle (DSV) manufactured by Triton Submarines and owned and operated since 2022 by Gabe Newell's Inkfish ocean-exploration research organization. It holds the records for the deepest crewed dives in all five oceans. Limiting Factor was commissioned by Victor Vescovo for $37 million and operated by his marine research organization, Caladan Oceanic, between 2018 and 2022. It is commercially certified by DNV for dives to full ocean depth, and is operated by a pilot, with facilities for an observer.

The vessel was used in the Five Deeps Expedition, becoming the first crewed submersible to reach the deepest point in all five oceans. Over 21 people have visited Challenger Deep, the deepest area on Earth, in the DSV. Limiting Factor was used to identify the wrecks of the destroyers USS Johnston at a depth of 6,469 m (21,224 ft), and USS Samuel B. Roberts at 6,865 m (22,523 ft), in the Philippine Trench, the deepest dives on wrecks. It has also been used for dives to the French submarine Minerve (S647) at about 2,350 m (7,710 ft) in the Mediterranean sea, and RMS Titanic at about 3,800 m (12,500 ft) in the Atlantic.

== Commercial submersibles ==
Private firms such as U-boat Worx, Triton Submarines, LLC. SEAmagine Hydrospace and Sub Aviator Systems (or 'SAS') have developed small submersibles for tourism, exploration and adventure travel. A Canadian company in British Columbia called Sportsub has been building personal recreational submersibles since 1986 with open-floor designs (partially flooded cockpits).

A privately owned U.S. company, OceanGate, also participated in building submersibles, though the company fell under scrutiny when their submersible Titan imploded underwater with no survivors.

== Marine remotely operated vehicles ==
Small uncrewed submersibles called "remotely operated vehicles," (ROVs), are widely used to work in water too deep or too dangerous for divers, or when it is economically advantageous.

Remotely operated vehicles (ROVs) repair offshore oil platforms and attach cables to sunken ships to hoist them. Such remotely operated vehicles are attached by an umbilical cable (a thick cable providing power and communications) to a control center on a ship. Operators on the ship see video and/or sonar images sent back from the ROV and remotely control its thrusters and manipulator arm. The wreck of the Titanic was explored by such a vehicle, as well as by a crewed vessel.

== Autonomous underwater vehicles ==
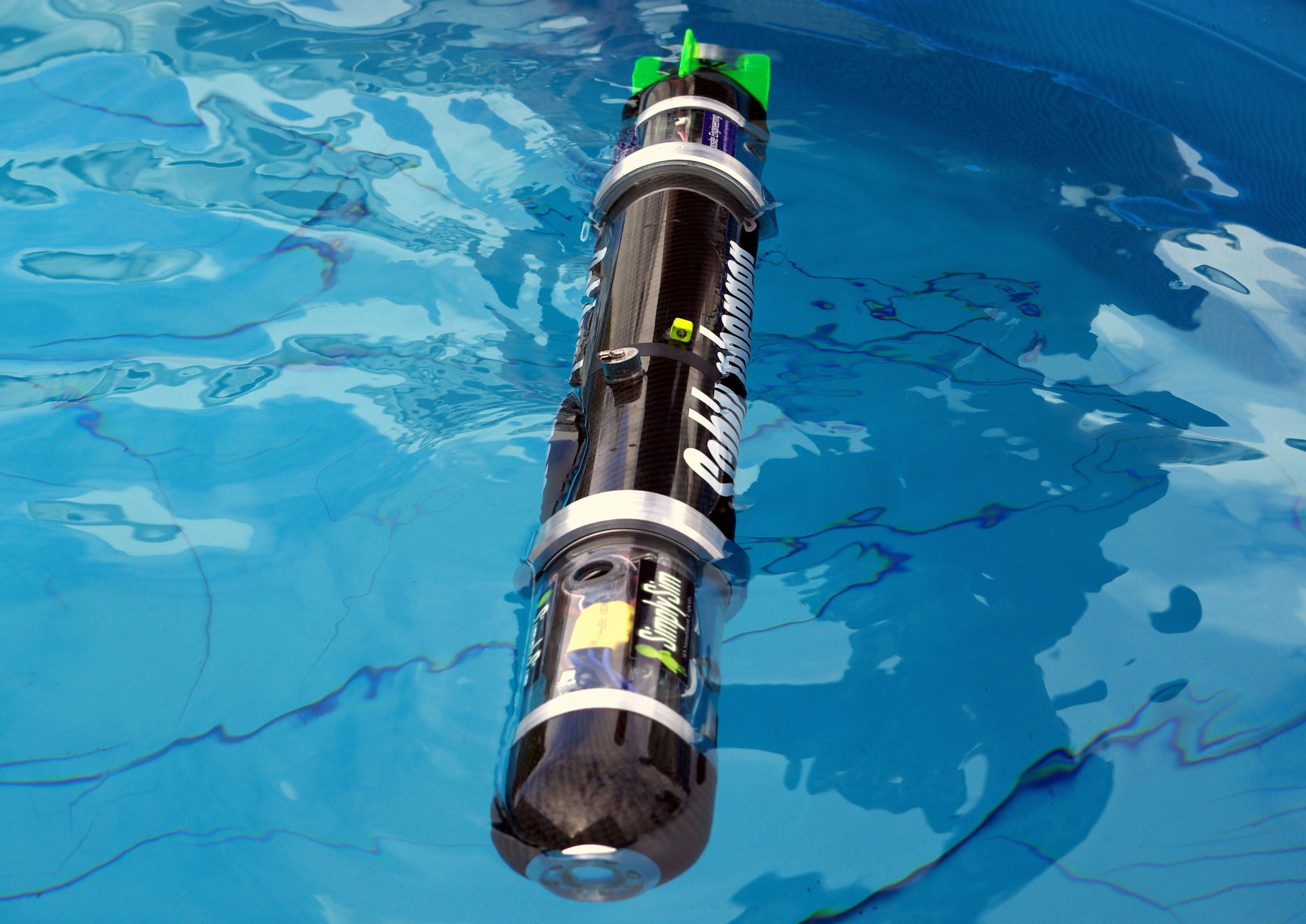
The Blackghost AUV is designed to undertake an underwater assault course autonomously with no outside control.

An autonomous underwater vehicle (AUV) is a robot that travels underwater without requiring continuous input from an operator. AUVs constitute part of a larger group of undersea systems known as unmanned underwater vehicles, a classification that includes non-autonomous remotely operated underwater vehicles (ROVs) – controlled and powered from the surface by an operator/pilot via an umbilical or using remote control. In military applications an AUV is more often referred to as an unmanned undersea vehicle (UUV). Underwater gliders are a subclass of AUVs.

== Diver lock-out submersible ==
Class of submersible which has an airlock and an integral diving chamber from which underwater divers can be deployed, such as:

- Deep Diver – Research submersible
- Antipodes (submersible) – Commercial submarine built in 1973

== See also ==
- Bathyscaphe – Free-diving self-propelled deep-sea submersible
- Bathysphere – Unpowered spherical deep-sea observation submersible lowered on a cable
- Benthoscope – Unpowered spherical deep-sea observation submersible lowered on a cable
- Diving bell – Chamber for transporting divers vertically through the water
- Diving chamber – Hyperbaric pressure vessel for human occupancy used in diving operations
- Hawkes Ocean Technologies – American marine engineering firm
- Midget submarine – Submarine under 150 tons
- Narco-submarine – Submersible used by drug smugglers
- Personal Submersibles Organization
- CSS David – Confederate States Navy torpedo boat
- Pisces V – Deep-submergence vehicle
- Remotely operated underwater vehicle – Tethered underwater mobile device operated by a remote crew
- Semi-submersible
- Submersible drilling rig – Vessel floated to site and lowered onto the seabed for drilling
- Timeline of diving technology – Chronological list of notable events in the history of underwater diving equipment
- Titan submersible implosion – 2023 maritime disaster
- Underwater acoustic positioning system – Sound-based navigation and tracking of vessels
- Welfreighter – British midget submarine of the Second World War

== Sources ==
- Polmar, Norman (2008). "Bathyscaph". World Book Online Reference Center.
