= DeepFlight Super Falcon =

Winged personal submarine

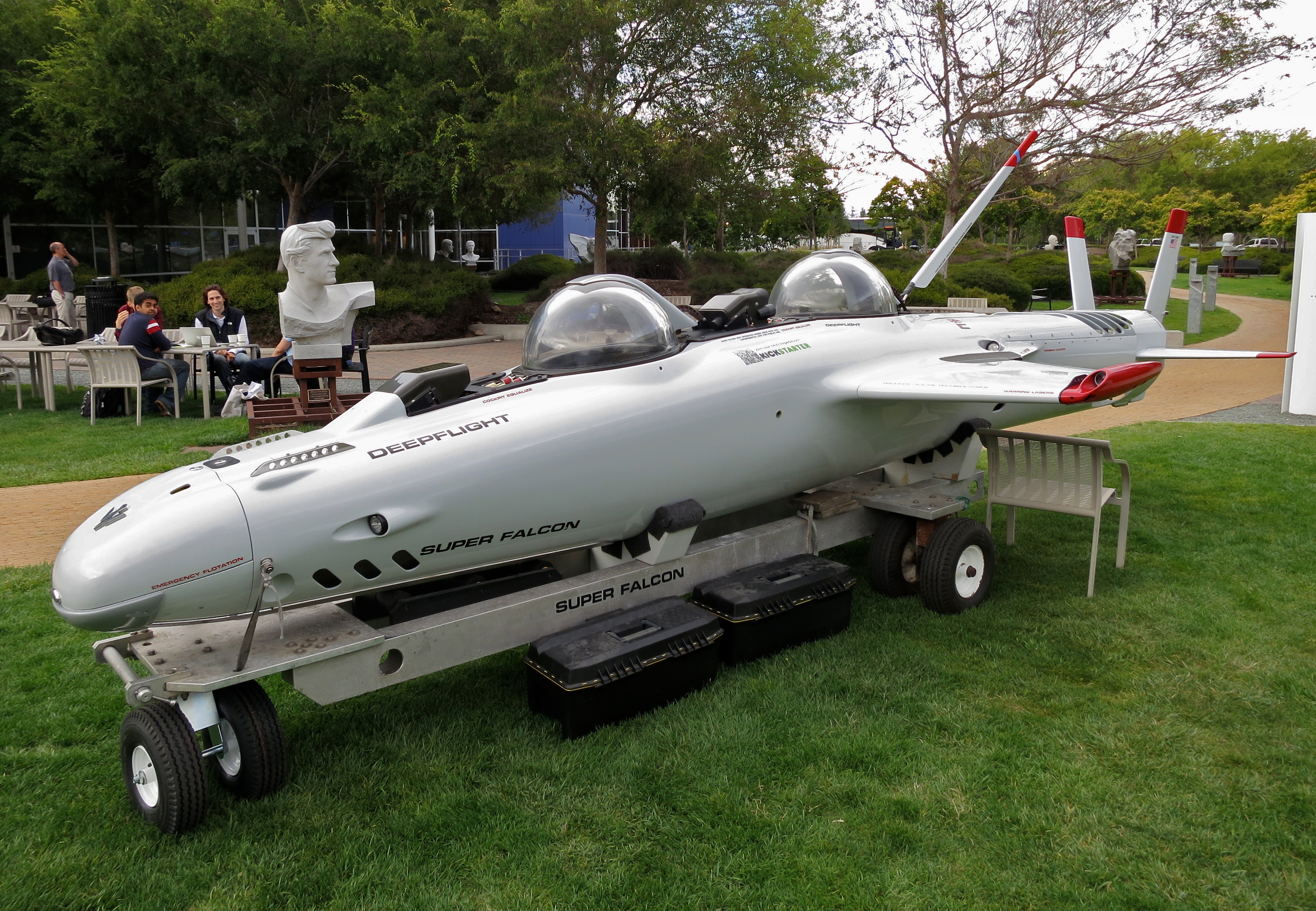

Class overview
- Builders: Hawkes Ocean Technologies

General characteristics Mark I
- Type: Submersible
- Displacement: 1,818 kg (4,008 lb)
- Length: 6.7 m (22 ft)
- Beam: 3.0 m (9.8 ft)
- Installed power: Electric battery
- Speed: 6 kn (11 km/h; 6.9 mph)
- Capacity: 2
- Crew: 2

General characteristics Mark II
- Type: Submersible
- Displacement: 1,818 kg (4,008 lb)
- Length: 5.9 m (19 ft)
- Beam: 2.7 m (8 ft 10 in)
- Height: 1.6 m (5 ft 3 in)
- Installed power: Electric battery
- Speed: 6 kn (11 km/h; 6.9 mph)
- Capacity: 2
- Crew: 2

The DeepFlight Super Falcon is a personal submarine designed by Graham Hawkes, a former civilian ocean engineer.

== Development ==
The Super Falcon was designed by Graham Hawkes. Later, he started designing submersible vehicles for both the oil industry and those in the scientific research sectors. One of his earlier submersibles was featured in the James Bond film For Your Eyes Only. Another was used in producer James Cameron's Aliens of the Deep.

The first test flight of the Super Falcon in 2009 ran into a few problems including getting the submersible stuck in a kelp bed, which had to be cut free with the help of a safety diver. Other initial problems included a broken propeller and rudder while performing vertical dives and 90° rolls.

== Design ==
=== Mark I ===
The Super Falcon is classified as a winged submersible with a numerical design designation of DF 302. With its wings deployed, it measures 3 m (9.8 ft) wide × 1.6 m (5 ft 3 in) × 6.7 m (22 ft) long. The width is reduced to 1.4 m (4 ft 7 in) with the side wings folded.

The electricity that drives the propulsion system is from batteries, the Super Falcon's cruise speed is between 2–6 knots (3.7–11.1 km/h; 2.3–6.9 mph). Its maximum thrust is 508 lb (230 kg). The maximum rate at which it can make a descent is 200 ft/min and the maximum rate at which it can ascend is 400 ft/min. It can operate at a depth of 1,000 fsw with a payload of 230 kg (510 lb), or 2 people. It has a launch weight of 1,818 kg (4,008 lb).

=== Mark II ===
The redesigned Super Falcon is 5.9 m (19 ft) long, 1.4–2.7 m (4.6–8.9 ft) wide (wings folded or extended, respectively), 1.6 m (5.2 ft) tall, and a launch weight of 1,818 kg (4,008 lb). It has a cruising speed of 2–6 kn (3.7–11.1 km/h; 2.3–6.9 mph), under thrust of 231 kgf (2,270 N; 510 lbf), with an operating depth of 120 m (390 ft). It can carry a crew of 2, and a payload of 230 kg (510 lb) including the crew. The vehicle uses lithium ion batteries for energy storage.

== Submarines ==
The Mateschitz Super Falcon is a Mark II custom fitted to Red Bull billionaire Dietrich Mateschitz, for use at the island and resort that he owns, Laucala Island in Fiji. It is the first resort-based Super Falcon.
