= Diver navigation =

Underwater navigation by scuba divers

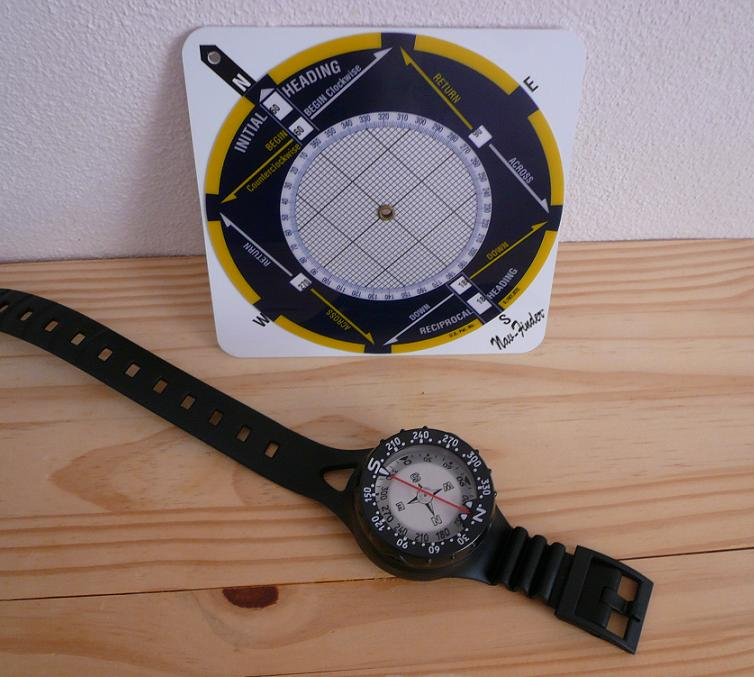
Nav finder and underwater compass – basic underwater navigation tools

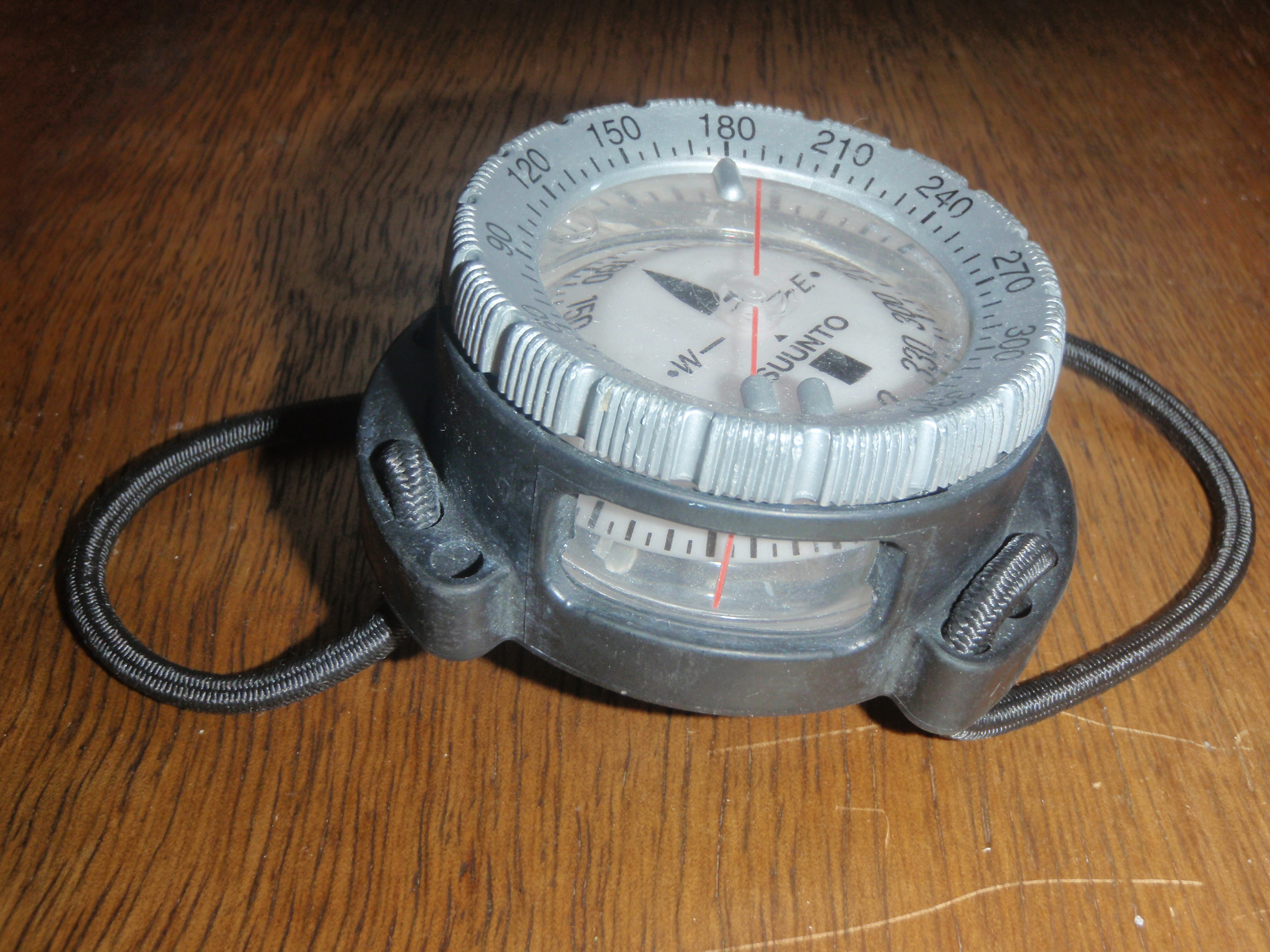
Suunto SK-7 diving compass in aftermarket wrist mount with bungee straps

Diver navigation, termed "underwater navigation" by scuba divers, is a set of techniques—including observing natural features, the use of a compass, and surface observations—that divers use to navigate underwater. Free-divers do not spend enough time underwater for navigation to be important, and surface supplied divers are limited in the distance they can travel by the length of their umbilicals and are usually directed from the surface control point. On those occasions when they need to navigate they can use the same methods used by scuba divers.

Although it is considered a basic skill, it is normally only taught to a limited degree as part of basic Open Water certification. Most North American diver training agencies only teach significant elements of underwater navigation as part of the Advanced Open Water Diver certification program.

Underwater navigation is usually a core component of most, if not all, advanced recreational diver training. In the PADI Advanced Open Water Diver course, it is one of the two mandatory skills (together with Deep diving) which must be taken alongside three elective skills.

Training agencies promote underwater navigation as a skill (despite the fact that it is less popular than other recreational diving specialties) on the basis that it:

- builds diver confidence
- saves energy by minimising excess swimming
- makes dive planning more effective
- keeps dive buddies together
- reduces air consumption

Underwater compass navigation is a component of the scuba-based underwater sport, underwater orienteering.

When it is critical for safety to return to a specific place, a distance line is generally used. This may be laid and left in place for other divers, or recovered on the return leg. Use of distance lines is standard in penetration diving, where the divers cannot ascend directly to the surface at all times, and it is possible to lose track of the route out to open water.

== Techniques ==
Underwater navigation in recreational diving is broadly split into two categories. Natural navigation techniques, and orienteering, which is navigation focused upon the use of an underwater magnetic compass.

Natural navigation, sometimes known as pilotage, involves orienting by naturally observable phenomena, such as sunlight, water movement, bottom composition (for example, sand ripples run parallel to the direction of the wave front, which tends to run parallel to the shore), bottom contour and noise. Although natural navigation is taught on courses, developing the skills is generally more a matter of experience.

Orienteering, or compass navigation, is a matter of training, practice and familiarity with the use of underwater compasses, combined with various techniques for reckoning distance underwater, including kick cycles (one complete upward and downward sweep of a kick), time, air consumption and occasionally by actual measurement. Kick cycles depend on the diver's finning technique and equipment, but are generally more reliable than time, which is critically dependent on speed, or air consumption, which is critically dependent on depth, work rate, diver fitness, and equipment drag. Techniques for direct measurement also vary, from the use of calibrated distance lines or surveyor's tape measures, to a mechanism like an impeller log, to pacing off the distance along the bottom with the arms.

Many skilled underwater navigators use techniques from both of these categories in a seamless combination, using the compass to navigate between landmarks over longer distances and in poor visibility, while making use of the generic oceanographic indicators to help stay on course and as a check that there is no mistake with the bearing, and then recognising landmarks and using them with the remembered topography of a familiar site to confirm position.

=== Using natural features ===
==== Landmarks ====
Recognisable topographical features may be remembered or noted and used identify position and direction. This is particularly useful if the visibility is sufficient to see the next landmark on the route before leaving the last. Landmarks are ordinarily considered permanent or semi-permanent features, such as ridges, boulders, wrecks or clumps of weed, but use can also be made of temporary marks such as anchor cables, shot lines, jackstays and guide lines.

==== Depth and depth variation ====
The slope of the bottom is often a reliable indicator of the direction toward the shore, particularly when the bottom is of soft or loose material, and is not broken up greatly by rocky outcrops. This information can be checked for reliability on a sufficiently detailed chart of the area. Contours of depth running roughly parallel to the coastline indicate a slope dipping directly away from the shore, and can be used to maintain a sense of distance and orientation relative to the shore. In some places where the bottom is composed of predominantly rocky outcrops the slope may be in any direction and is not a reliable indicator of direction.

==== Angle of the sun, changes in light level ====
If circumstances of depth and water clarity allow the position of the sun to produce sufficient variation in brightness, this may indicate the direction of the sun, and be used as a cue to orientation. The effect is greater if the sun is relatively low in the sky, the water is clean, the depth fairly shallow and the surface fairly smooth.

In some circumstances the diver can look up at the surface, to see in which direction the land lies. These cues will not give any precise information about position, but will allow the diver to keep a mental picture of where he or she is and is going.

==== Current, wave and surge direction ====
Current direction can be useful as an orientation cue as long as the direction of the current is known. In rivers it tends to be fairly consistent and reliable, though localised eddies may occur. In the sea it may depend on weather conditions and local topography, as well as the state of the tide. In estuaries and harbours the currents will usually be predominantly tidal, so the state of the tide must be known, as the difference in direction between ebb and flow is usually about 180°.

Wave surge direction is essentially the same as wave direction, but may be felt at depths where the wave direction is no longer visible. It is useful if the offshore wave direction relative to the shore is known and does not change appreciably during the dive. In shallow water the wave crests will often be parallel to the shore. The important difference is that waves can be seen to travel in a definite direction, whereas surge is a back and forth motion, allowing a possible 180° error.

==== Ripple patterns on a sand bottom ====
A regular and distinct ripple pattern on a sand, mud or gravel bottom is an indication that it has been affected by wave action. The surge of the wave at depth causes the particles to be moved backwards and forwards in the direction the waves are travelling. This movement produces a ripple pattern on the bottom which is an indication of the wave direction on the surface. The ripple crests will be approximately parallel to the crests of the waves that formed them. It is however possible for the surface waves to change direction, and due to shorter wavelength, not reach the bottom to change the ripple pattern. When this is the case there will be no surge at the bottom. If there is a surge at the bottom, and the ripple crests are perpendicular the direction of the surge, then the wave crests will be parallel to the ripple crests. Ripple crests, like surge, may be interpreted with a 180° error.

==== Dip and strike of bedrock ====
Many rock formations have characteristic angles known as dip and strike. Dip is the slope of the strata from the horizontal, and strike is the general direction of the strata in the horizontal plane (very roughly). These characteristics will usually be similar in the rocks above and below the water in a locality, so they can be used to estimate direction. Ridges above and below water are often parallel, and gullies and valleys may well extend under water for considerable distances.

==== Ecological variations ====
Different areas may for a wide variety of reasons have different ecologies. A diver who is familiar with an area can use the diversity variations and patterns to provide orientation cues.

There is often variation of ecological zoning with depth, but a diver is expected to be aware of the depth all the time anyway. In some places the seaward side of big rocks may have different species from the shoreward face because of the greater exposure to wave action.

Sea fans and sponges are filter feeders, and may grow into a fan shape at right angles to the usual current or surge direction, to get the maximum volume of water flowing past them.

=== Using a compass ===
==== How a compass works ====
The magnetic compass indicates the local direction of the ambient magnetic field, which is usually that of the Earth. This is usually a reliable and consistent feature and is very useful as a navigational aid as it is not affected by visibility, pressure, or the presence of water.

An important concept is that the compass card should not turn, even though it appears to always "swing" to magnetic north. The housing that holds the compass card turns around the card, which remains pointing in the same direction (Magnetic North) all the time. There are occasions when the card does turn, but this is when it has been stuck or the compass is turned over, and the card is unable to remain aligned with the magnetic field.

==== True or geographic north ====
True north is the geometrically accurate direction along the surface of the earth toward the North pole of the planet's axis of rotation. The lines of longitude on maps are in true North/South directions.

==== Magnetic north and variation ====
The Earth has a magnetic field which is not quite in line with the geographic directions. The difference between the magnetic and true directions is known as Variation. It differs from place to place and changes with time. Large scale charts and maps will usually include a compass rose showing variation.

==== Compass north and deviation ====
The compass will indicate the magnetic field direction at the place where it happens to be at the time. If there are influences other than the Earth's magnetic field, these may change the direction indicated by the compass. These effects are called deviation, and can be caused by a whole range of things. Any magnetic object or electrical current will have an influence, some more than others. The current in a dive computer is too small to affect the compass, even when quite near, but the hull of a ship or overhead power lines may make a difference even several meters away. It is difficult and often impossible to correct for all possible deviations, but it is worth checking a dive compass for deviation caused by dive equipment. It has been known for regulators to cause deviation, steel cylinders can cause deviation, and powerful lights may be a problem. A diver propulsion vehicle with an electric motor is also a potential problem for those who use them, though divers have been known to navigate adequately using compasses mounted on the handgrip of a DPV. A magnetic clip used to secure equipment to the diver's harness has a powerful magnet in both parts, and should not be used to hold the compass, as the part attached to the compass will produce a serious error.

Deviation may be checked by comparing the compass bearing as measured with a known magnetic bearing measured by a compass with no deviation. Deviation may vary with different directions and for accurate work it is necessary to make up a table of deviations. This is done for ships, but for diving it is generally not worth the trouble. Bearings of one diver's compass may vary from those of another diver even if they have both been read correctly. The difference should not be large, but it can result in being off course and not finding something. A compass is a magnet, and will affect another compass nearby, so they can not be checked by putting them together.

==== Dip ====
The magnetic field of the earth is tilted from the horizontal. The angle is called dip and varies with place, so compasses can be corrected for different zones. This is a factory process. A compass made for the northern parts of the northern hemisphere will tilt badly in the southern hemisphere, in some cases to the extent that it will jam if held horizontal.

=== Using guidelines ===
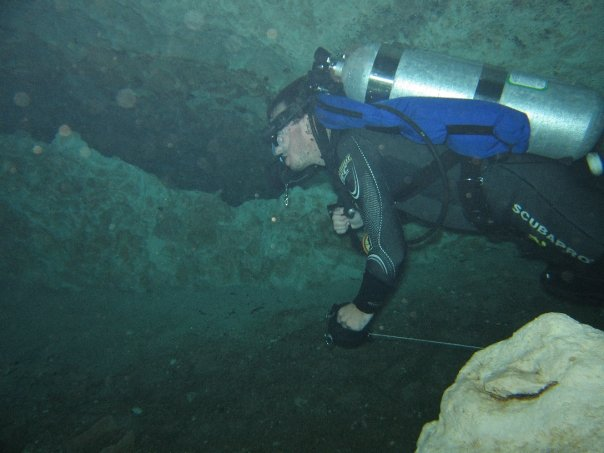
A cave diver running a distance line into the overhead environment to facilitate a safe exit

Also known as cave lines, distance lines, penetration lines and jackstays. These are permanent or temporary lines laid by divers to mark a route, particularly in caves, wrecks and other areas where the way out from an overhead environment may not be obvious. Guidelines are also useful in the event of silt out.

Distance lines are wound on to a spool or a reel. The length of the distance line used is dependent on the plan for the dive. An open water diver using the distance line only for a surface marker buoy may only need 50 metres / 165 feet, whereas a cave diver may use multiple reels of lengths from 50 ft (15 m) to 1000+ ft (300 m).

Reels for distance lines may have a locking mechanism, ratchet or adjustable drag to control deployment of the line and a winding handle to help keep slack line under control and rewind line. Lines are used in open water to deploy surface marker buoys and decompression buoys and link the buoy on the surface to the submerged diver, or may be used to allow easy return navigation to a point such as a shotline or boat anchor.

The material used for any given distance line will vary based on intended use, nylon being the material of choice for cave diving. A common line used is 2 mm (0.08 inch) polypropylene line when it does not matter if the line is buoyant.

The use of guideline for navigation requires careful attention to laying and securing the line, line following, marking, referencing, positioning, teamwork, and communication.

==== Line markers ====
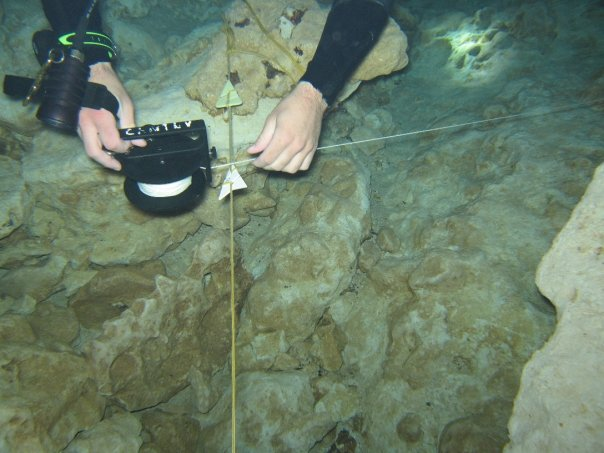
A line arrow on a cave's main guideline pointing to the exit

Illustration showing typical cave line markers and how they are attached to the line for security.: Top: line arrow – directional information – points along the line leading to the nearest surface with breathable air; Middle: cookie – non-directional personal marker; Bottom: hybrid/referencing exit marker – directional personal marker

In cave (and occasionally wreck) diving, line markers are used for orientation as a visual and tactile reference on a permanent guideline. Directional markers (commonly arrows), are also known as line arrows or Dorff arrows, and point the way to an exit. Line arrows may mark the location of a "jump" location in a cave when two are placed adjacent to each other. Two adjacent arrows facing away from each other, mark a point in the cave where the diver is equidistant from two exits. Arrow direction can be identified by feel in low visibility. Non-directional markers ("cookies") are purely personal markers that mark specific spots, or the direction of one's chosen exit at line intersections where there are options. Their shape does not provide a tactile indication of direction as this could cause confusion in low visibility. One important reason to be adequately trained before cave diving is that incorrect marking can confuse and fatally endanger not only oneself, but also other divers.

=== Using surface control personnel ===
In some circumstances divers may be directed by their surface control personnel. This requires a method of communication between the surface team and the diver. Both voice communications and line signals may be used to direct the movement of the diver and to provide other information. Surface direction may be used in scuba diving when diving under ice or conducting an underwater search, and in surface supplied diving for both these purposes and at any other time that it is useful or convenient for the dive controller to direct the movement of the diver. Surface direction is most useful when the surface personnel have a better idea of where the diver is relative to where he or she needs to be than the diver has, which can happen when the visibility is poor, or when the diver is following a search pattern controlled by the surface controller.

== Surface navigation for diving ==
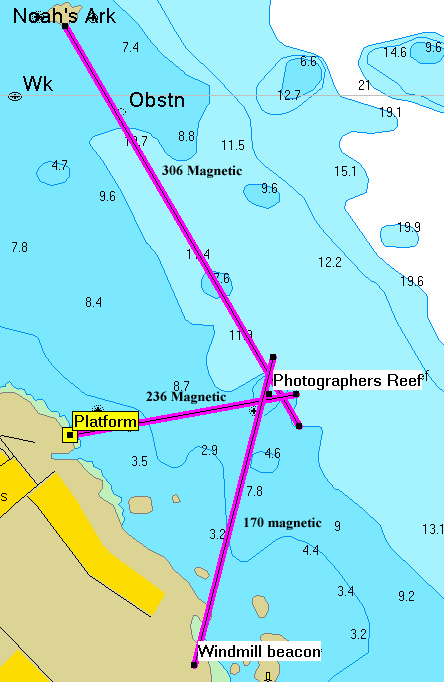
Cocked hat on chart showing navigational error

Surface applications for compass navigation include marking a position and finding the position using compass bearings. At least two position lines are required to fix a position, as only direction can be found using a compass. When two bearings are used a large angle between the bearings will minimize error. The angle should preferably be between 60 and 120 degrees, and near 90 degrees would be ideal. Three bearings are better as they will also give an indication of probable accuracy when plotted on a chart. The "cocked hat" or triangle where the lines intersect, shows the probable location of the position measured, and a small triangle indicates a small probable error. The angle between the three bearings should preferably be in the order of 60 or 120 degrees where available landmarks allow. In all cases landmarks should be as close to the diver as possible and spread over a large arc for best accuracy.

== Equipment ==
Various pieces of equipment are available to assist divers navigating underwater.

- Magnetic compasses, set either in a diver's console or wrist mounted. Various forms exist.
- Scuba sextant, or Nav-finder, to enable a diver to plot an ongoing course during a dive.
- Compass boards
- Hand-held sonar
- Cave and wreck reels and line
- Jump spools

Periodically reports are issued suggesting the development of underwater GPS technology, but no system is currently available on market. It is generally thought that the difficulty of locating satellite by signals from underwater at present is not capable of being overcome by existing technology.

=== Diving compasses ===
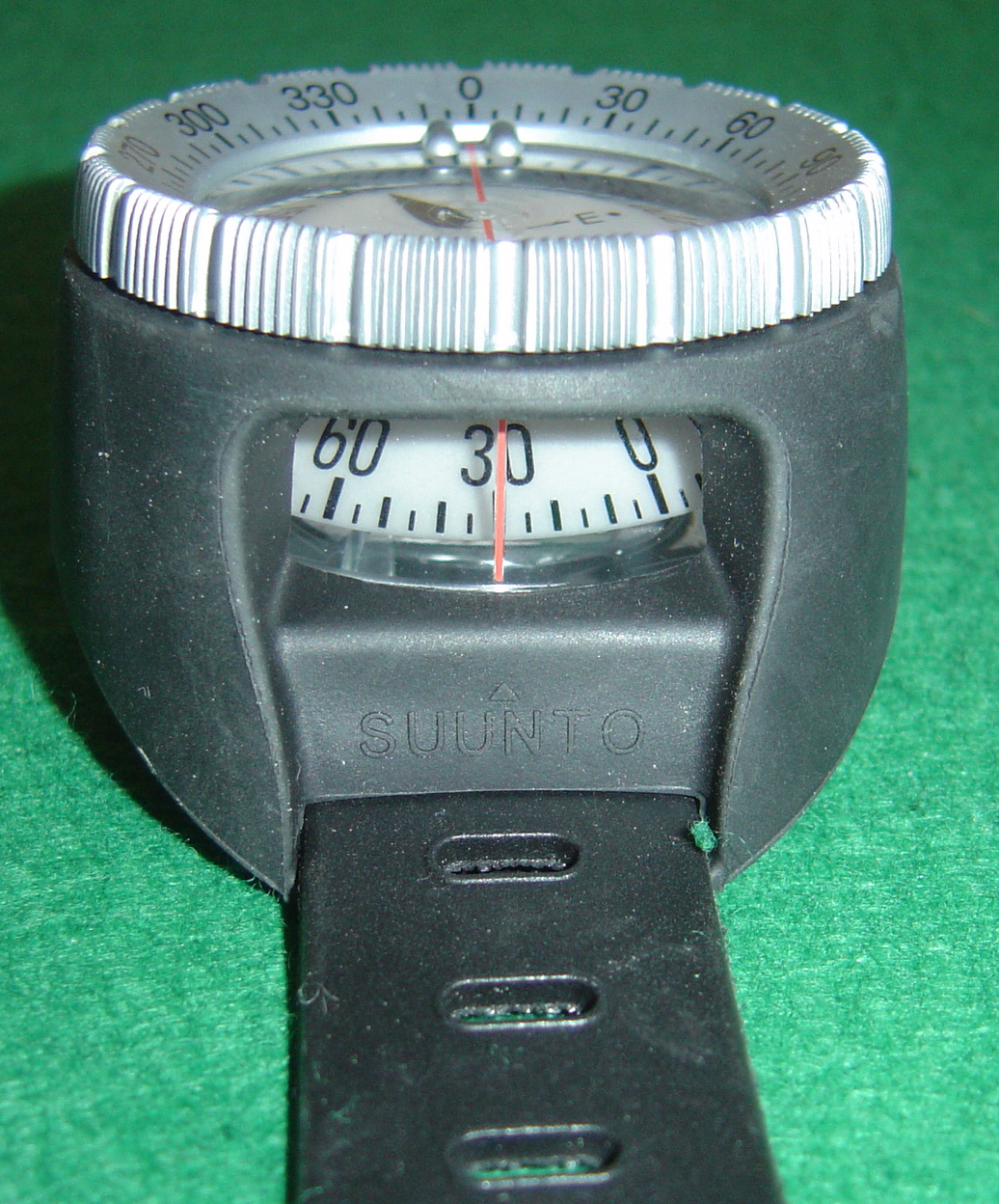
Diving wrist compass showing window for reading bearing and course

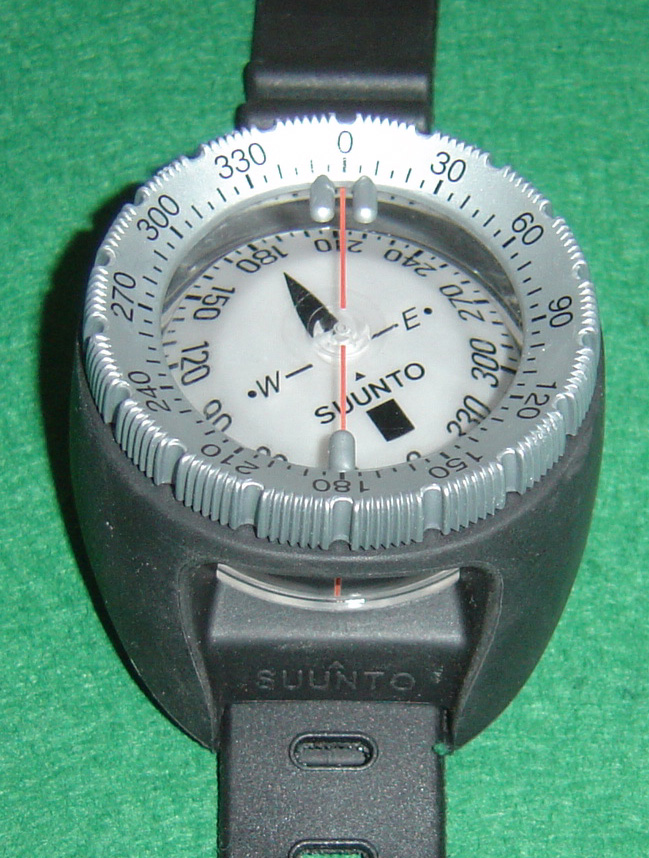
SK-7 indirect reading diving wrist compass

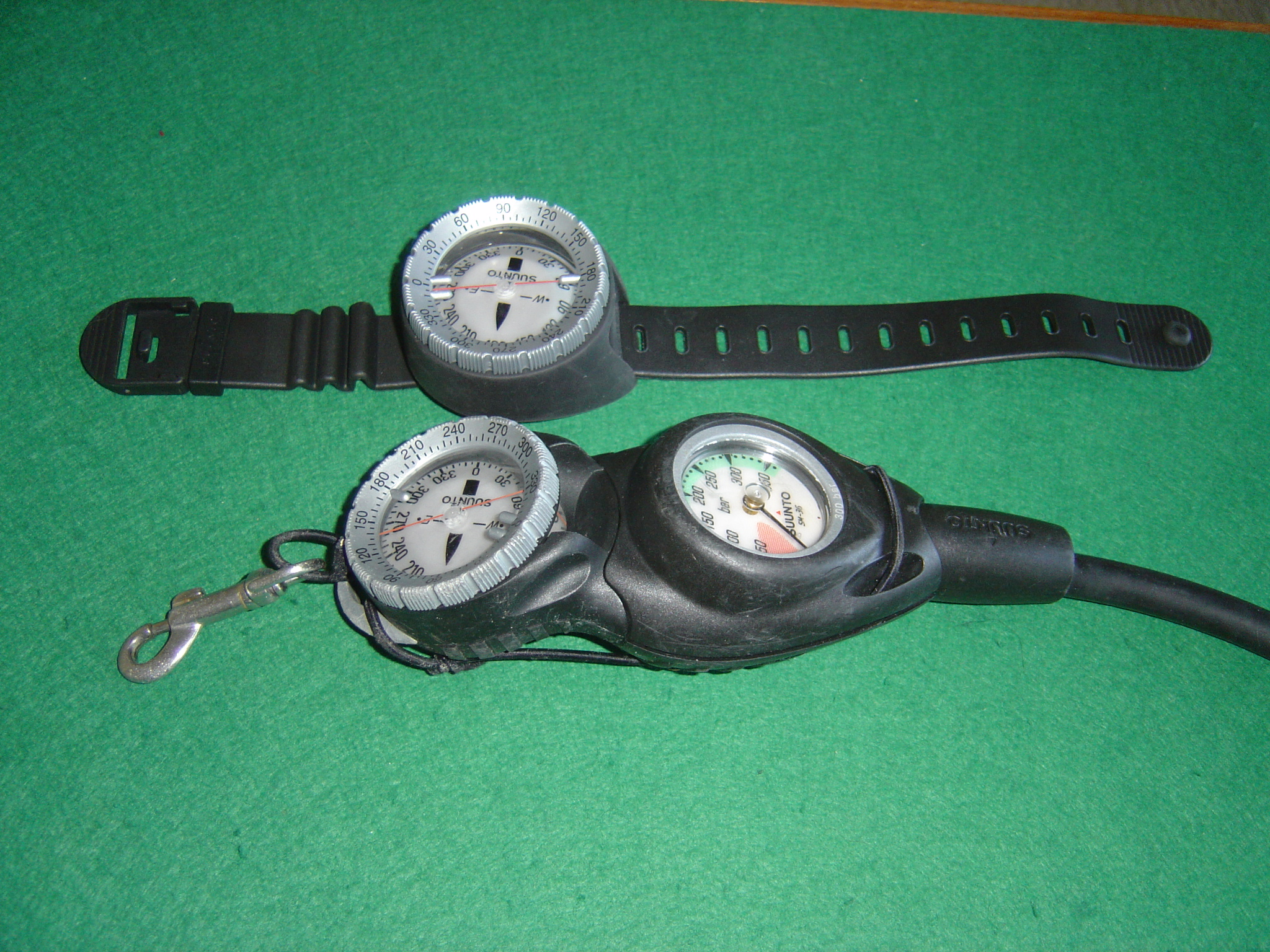
Comparison of wrist and console mount for diving compasses

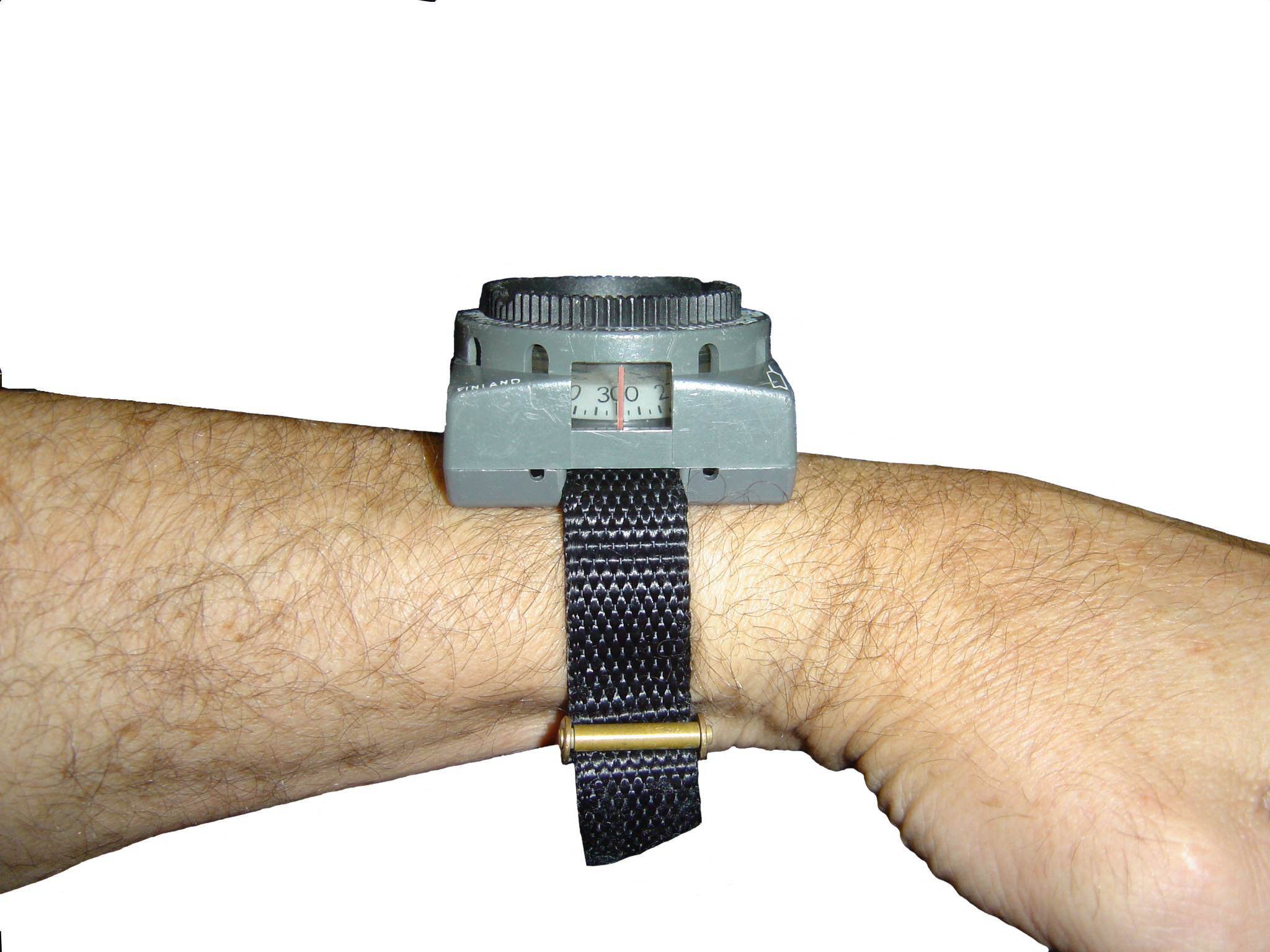
Reading a bearing from a wrist mount diving compass

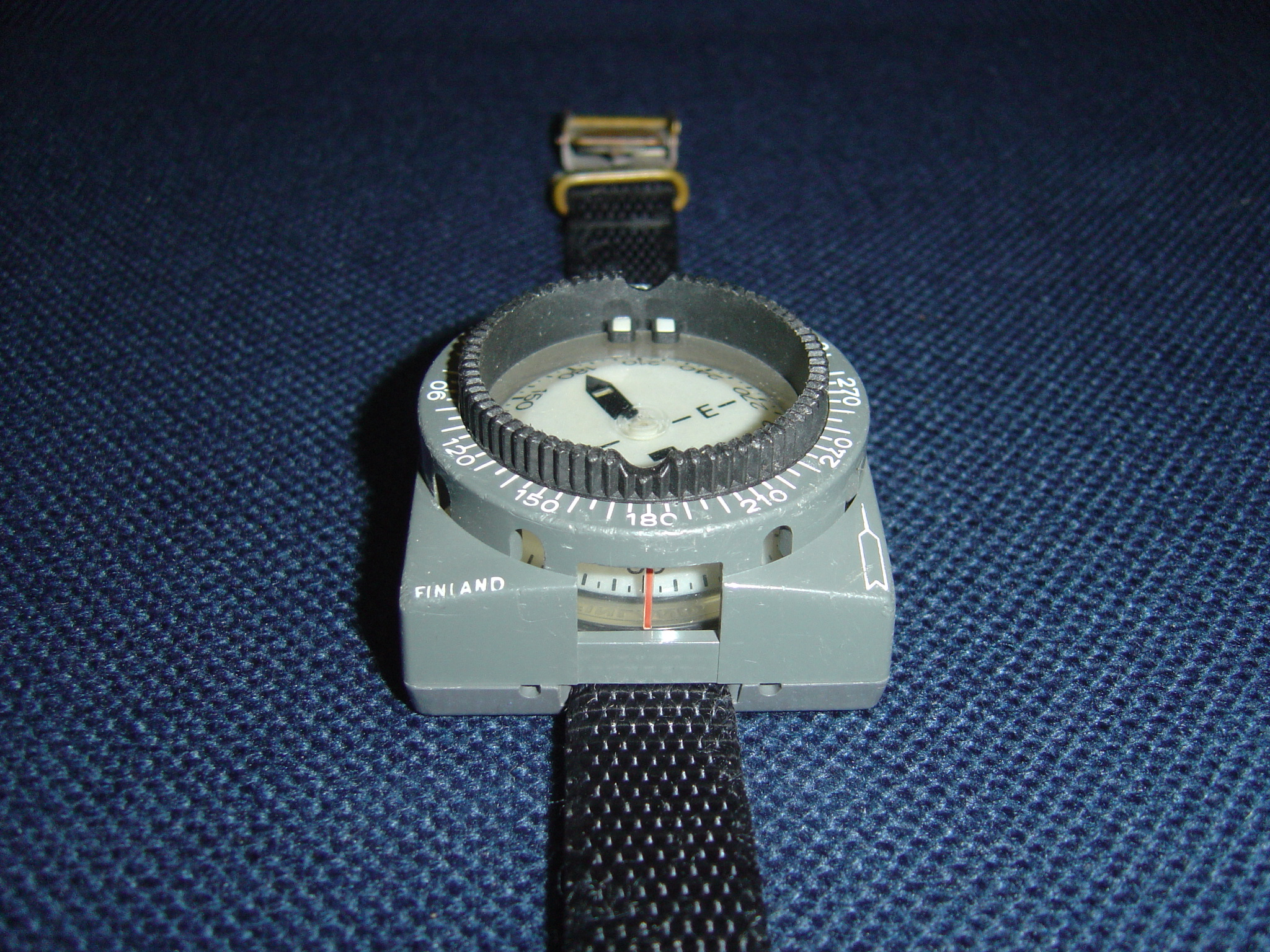
Suunto indirect reading wrist mount diving compass

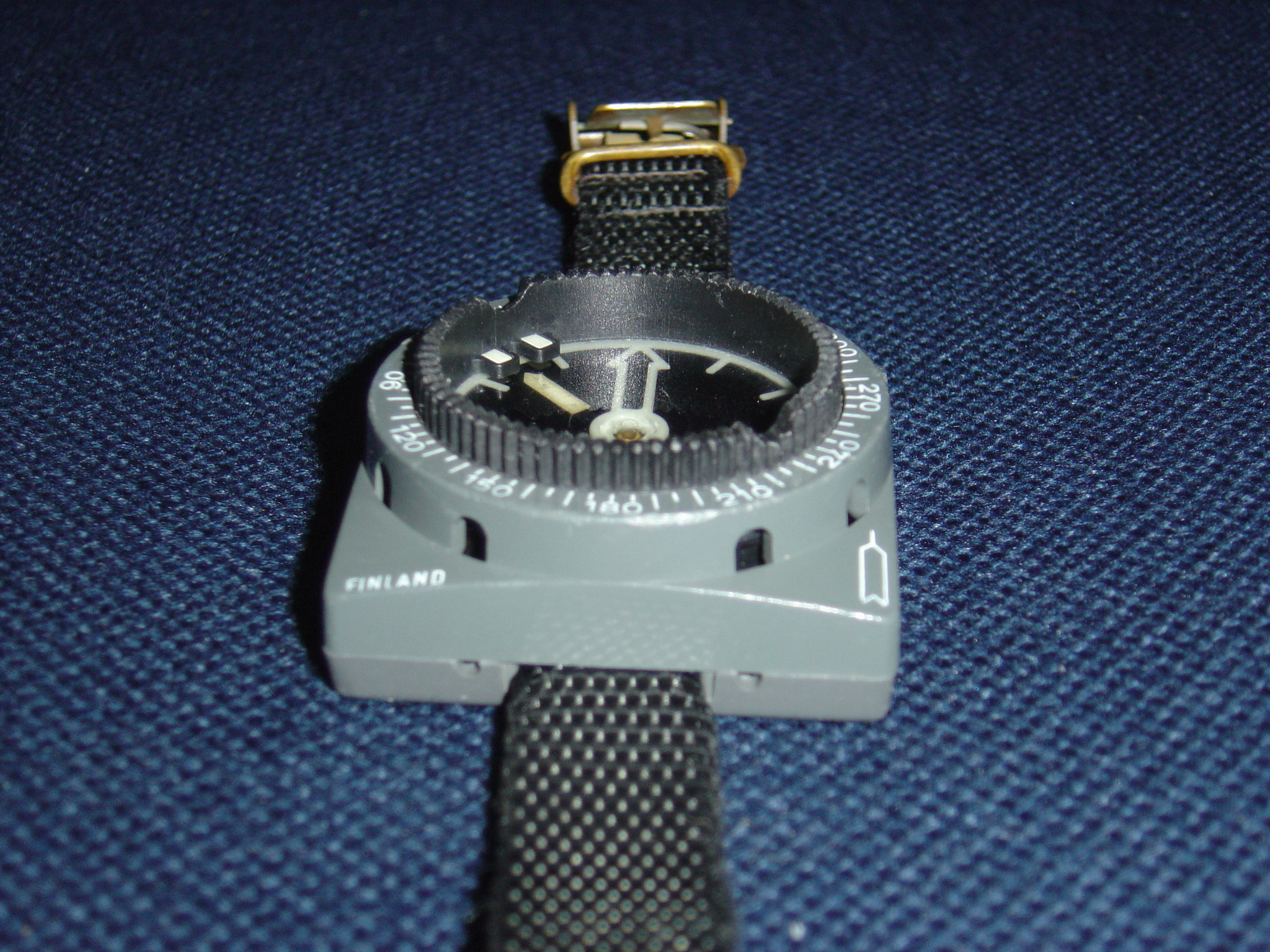
Suunto direct reading wrist mount diving compass

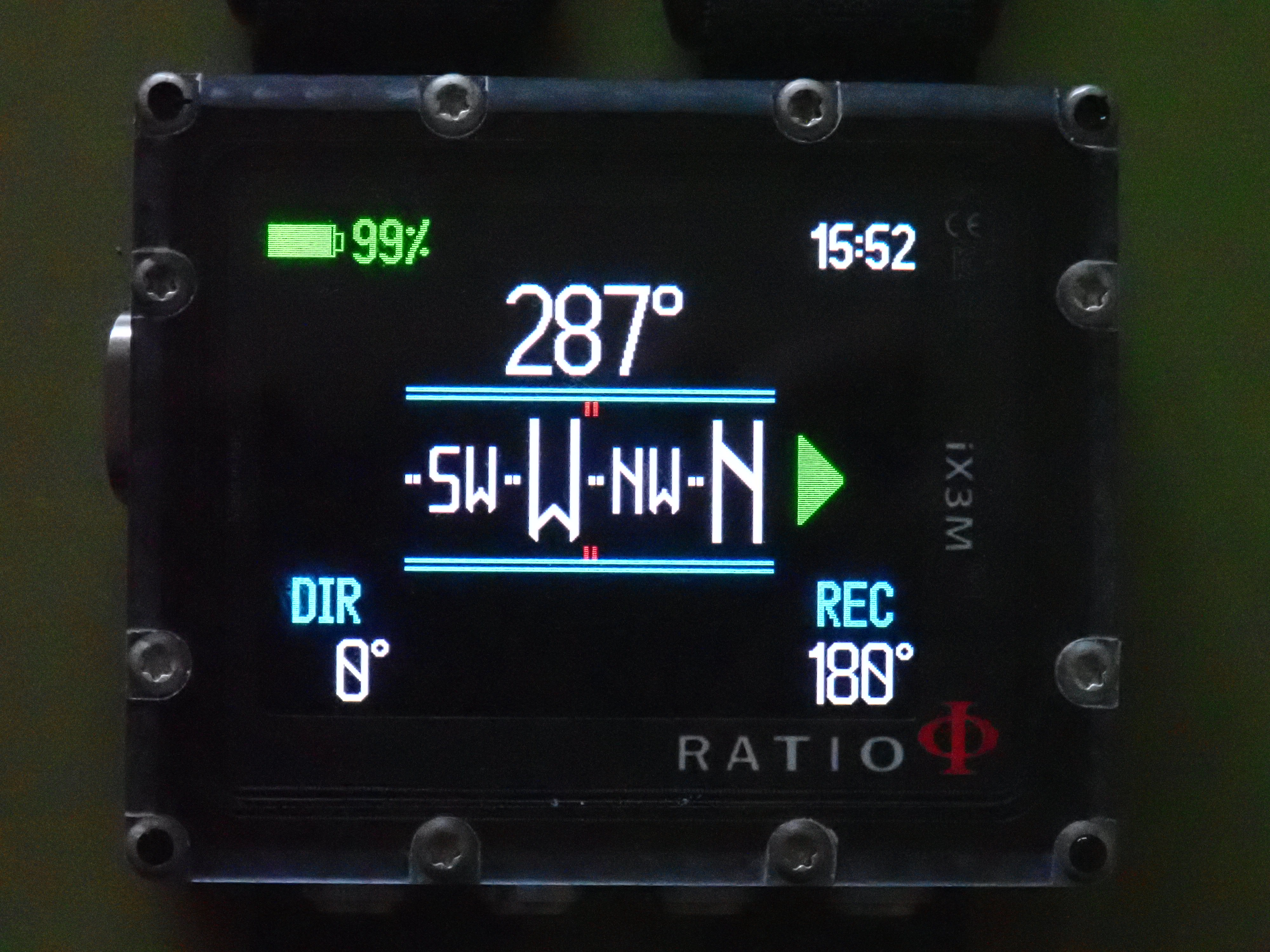
Ratio iX3M GPS dive computer in compass mode

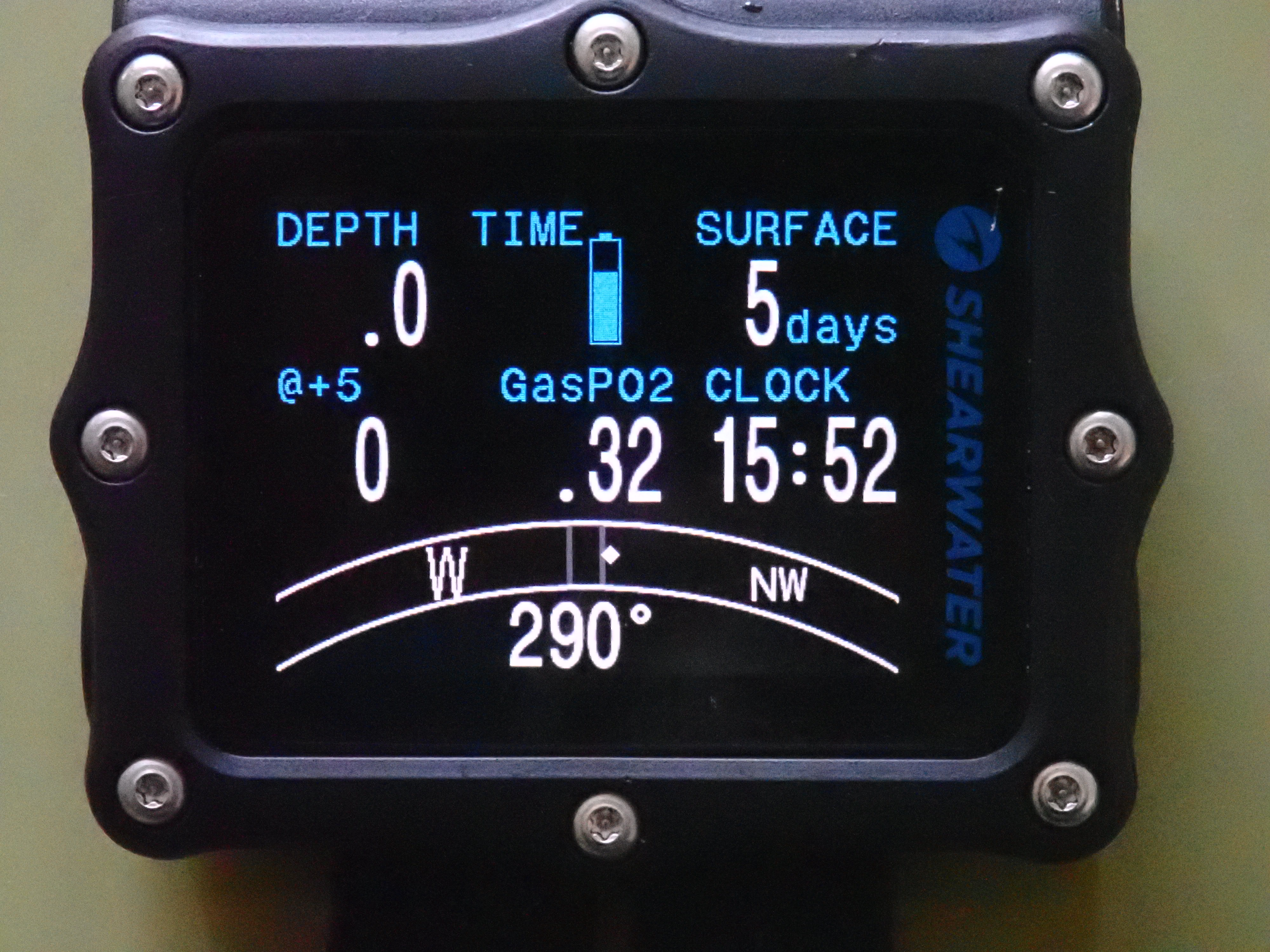
Shearwater Perdix dive computer in compass mode

==== Construction ====
The typical diving compass is made from a card with graduation in degrees, mounted on a pivot in a transparent housing filled with fluid which damps the movement and prevents pressure collapse of the housing. It may be wrist mounted, console mounted or carried some other way. It is desirable that the compass can operate accurately at significant tilt angles without sticking.

On the card there is a magnet which will interact with the ambient magnetic field so as to align itself and the card with the field provided it is free to rotate. There will be other marks on the housing which are intended to be aligned with the direction of travel of the user, so the offset of the card to the housing will indicate the direction of the magnetic field and the orientation of the user.

Important features of a diving compass are that it can easily be read in dim light, the card or needle does not easily jam if the housing is tilted slightly, and that it can be securely attached to the diver's arm or equipment and does not get lost. It is useful for any straps to be adjustable while wearing gloves, and any clips that may attached should be non-magnetic.

The strap should be long enough to go round the diver's wrist over the diving suit glove, and if it is slightly elastic it will stay in place when the suit compresses.

There may be a movable bezel which can be set to record a course and to help set a reciprocal course.

There are also electronic compasses which can provide a digital or analogue display These are based on magnetometer technology. Several models of dive computer incorporate a compass function, but this may not be accessible at the same time as the primary decompression information, and may be limited in their precision of display information.

==== Direct and Indirect reading compasses ====
There are two ways in which a compass may be marked, which influence the way you would read them. These are known as direct reading compasses and indirect reading compasses. Both provide the same information to the same level of accuracy. Both types may have graduations on the card which can be read through a side window to give the bearing directly.

The direct reading compass has graduations on the housing which read anti-clockwise round the face, with zero on the far side. The effect of this configuration is that if the housing is aligned with a direction, the north point of the card or needle will point directly towards the number representing the bearing. No further effort is needed on the part of the operator, you just find the number the arrow points at and read off the bearing. The bezel has no graduations, it is just a marker to align the card.

The indirect reading compass has graduations on the bezel. These graduations are clockwise round the face, and the zero mark coincides with the notch. To take a bearing the compass must first be aligned with the direction, then the bezel must be turned so that the notch aligns with the north point of the card or needle, and the bearing can then be read at the far side of the compass.

==== Electronic compasses ====
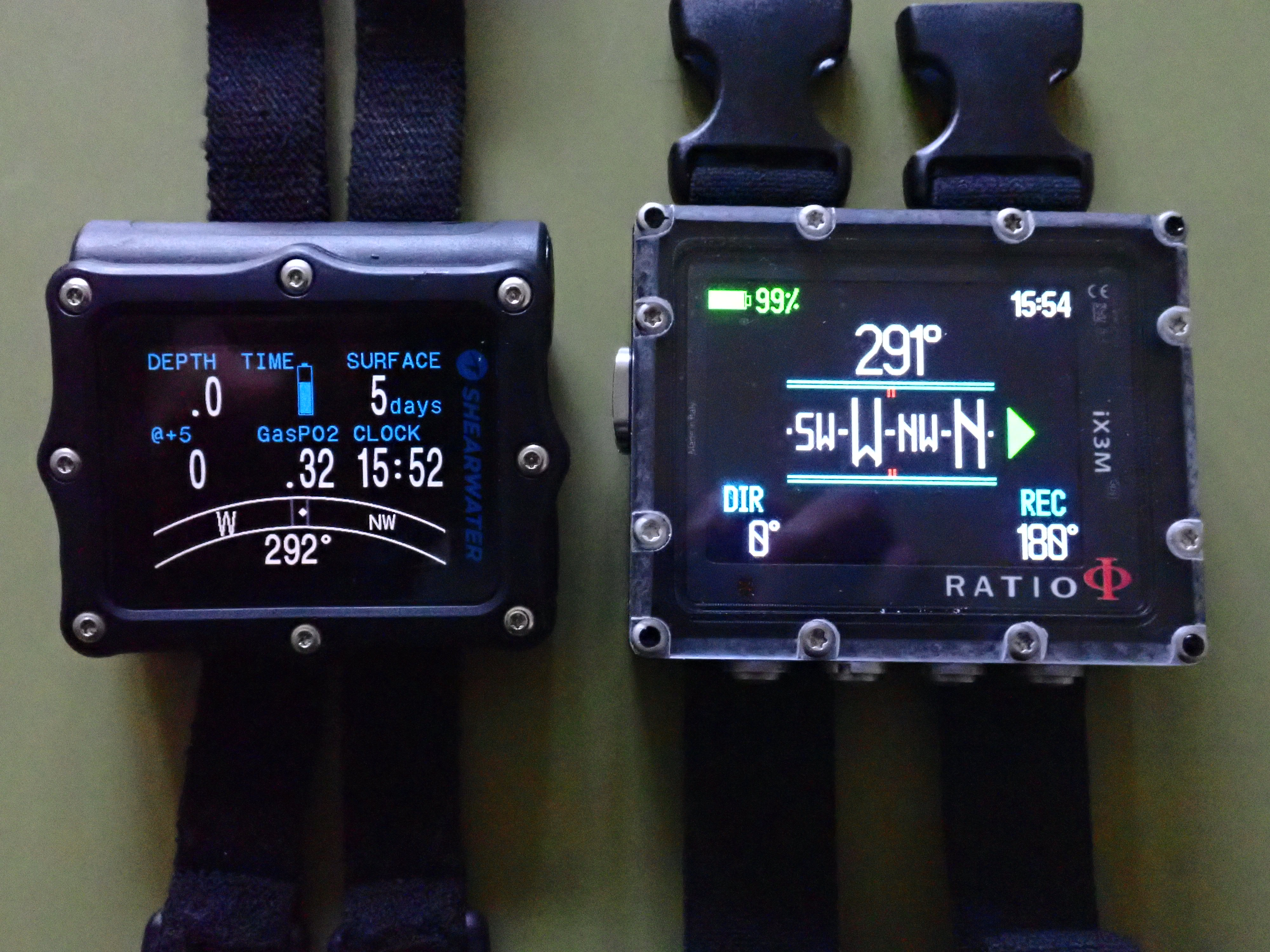
Shearwater Perdix and Ratio iX3M GPS dive computers in compass mode

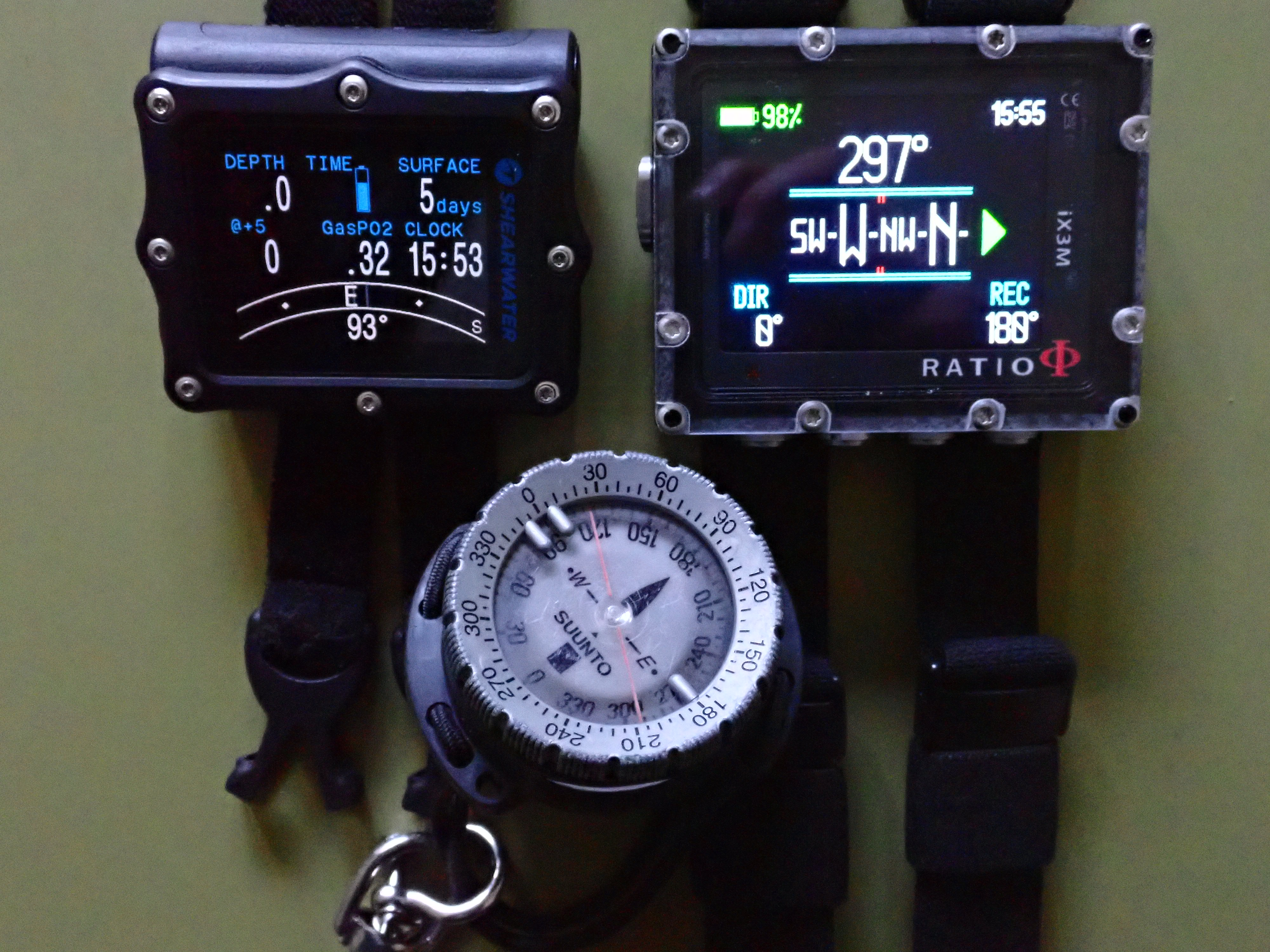
Shearwater Perdix and Ratio iX3M GPS dive computers in compass mode with Suunto SK7 magnetic compass in close proximity

Flux-gate compasses are built into several models of dive computer as an extra function. They may require calibration when powered up, but calibration usually lasts as long as the processor is running. They are usually insensitive to tilt as there are no moving parts to jam. The display varies, and may not be as intuitive as for a mechanical compass needle or card arrangement. They can often be calibrated to account for local deviation and give true direction. The nearby presence of a magnetic compass can cause large error, but they are not greatly affected by other electronic compasses, as can be seen from the images.

Some digital cameras for underwater use also have a built in flux-gate compass (such as the Olympus TG series) which can be used for navigation as well as for recording the direction of a photograph.

== Training and certification ==
Professional divers will learn basic underwater navigation as part of their entry-level training as a skill set that is inherently part of the diver's working skills.

Recreational divers may learn underwater navigation in stages as part of general diving skills, as in the CMAS system, in the Two-star and Three-star courses, or may learn it as a separate specialty course, as in the PADI system, where the training program and certification are called "Underwater Navigator". Navigation under an overhead using a permanent or temporary guide line (distance line), including the skills of laying and recovering line, are included as integral parts of cave and wreck penetration training due to their critical importance to safety in those environments.

== See also ==
- Submarine navigation – Skills and tech involved in submarine navigation

== Sources ==
- PADI Underwater Navigation Manual (2003), ISBN 1-878663-15-1
