= U-Boat Worx =

Dutch submersible manufacturer

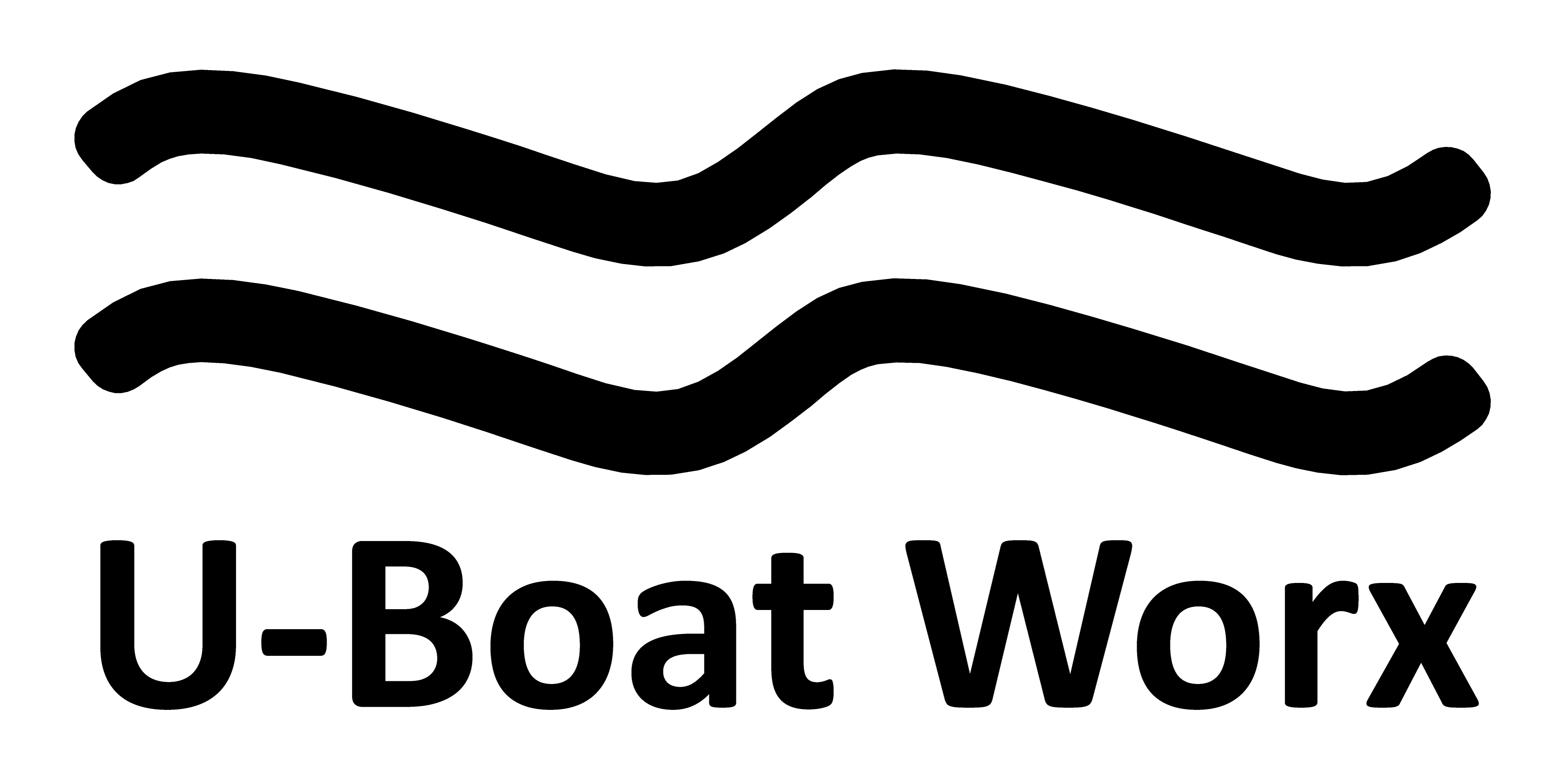
- Company type: Private
- Founded: 2005; 21 years ago
- Founder: Bert Houtman
- Headquarters: Breda, The Netherlands
- Products: Crewed submersibles
- Number of employees: 70+
- Website: https://www.uboatworx.com

U-Boat Worx is a Dutch manufacturer of crewed submersibles, which it designs and builds in-house in the Netherlands for private, scientific, and commercial use, including the superyacht and cruise-tourism sectors. The company is the only maker to series-produce private submersibles, the NEMO line. Trade publications have described it as the largest builder of private submarines in the world with over 60 submarines in operation.

Its models range from two-person recreational submersibles to the flagship model that can dive to 3,000 meters (9,845 feet)., and its Super Sub with a top speed of up to 10 knots, is marketed as the fastest private submersible.

== History ==
In the early 2000s, Bert Houtman had a successful career in the software industry. It culminated in the stock exchange listing of his company, Exact Software.[1] After that, he began looking for a personal submarine for his own enjoyment. However, he discovered that submersibles were used almost exclusively by the military or scientific institutions.

In his quest to personalise submarines for everyday use, Bert Houtman teamed up with a Canadian inventor, Peter Mitton,[2] who had pioneered a small one person Sub (C - Quester)[3] that provided the template for what was to follow.

That partnership ended in 2005;[1] Bert Houtman founded U-Boat Worx B.V. determined to expand the audience for private submersibles.

U-Boat Worx delivered in 2015 a private submarine for a Cruise Ship, this was the first cruise ship with a submarine operation onboard.[3] Later the Crystal Esprit and Genting Dream also took delivery of a U-Boat Worx submersibles.

Today the company manufactures various submarines for underwater use, including a primary model capable of diving to 3,000 meters (9,845 feet)

== The Name ==
The name "U-Boat Worx" is derived from "underwater boat”, referring to the boat-like handling that was distinctive in the original C-Quester design. A so-called double-hull principle that did not only use diving tanks to achieve positive buoyancy, but also a secondary boat-like hull that could be pumped empty was to make the submersible suitable for longer surface voyage and provide "boat-like" characteristics.[5]

The second part "Worx" is an abbreviation or alteration of "Works", which refers to the industrial nature of the production process.[5]

== Models ==
U-Boat Worx now has different series of submarines. The following models are in production.[6]

NEMO series

- NEMO-2 – two-person submarine, capable of diving to 100 meters

Super Yacht Sub series

- Super Yacht Sub 3 –three-person submarine, designed for yachts, capable of diving to 300 meters

C-Researcher series

- C-Researcher 2 – 500 - two-person submarine capable of diving to 500 meters
- C-Researcher 2 – 1140 - two-person submarine capable of diving to 1,140 meters
- C-Researcher 2 – 3000 - two-person submarine capable of diving to 3,000 meters
- C-Researcher 3 – 300 - three-person submarine capable of diving to 300 meters
- C-Researcher 3 – 1140 - three-person submarine capable of diving to 1,140 meters
- C-Researcher 3 – 2500 – three-person submarine capable of diving to 2,500 meters
- C-Researcher 5 – 300 – three-person submarine capable of diving to 300 meters

Cruise Sub series

- Cruise Sub 5 – 500 – five-person submarine, capable of diving to 500 meters
- Cruise Sub 5 – 1140 – five-person submarine, capable of diving to 1,140 meters
- Cruise Sub 5 – 1700 – five-person submarine, capable of diving to 1,700 meters
- Cruise Sub 7 – 300 – seven-person submarine, capable of diving to 300 meters
- Cruise Sub 7 – 1140 – seven-person submarine, capable of diving to 1,140 meters
- Cruise Sub 9 – 300 – nine-person submarine, capable of diving to 300 meters
- Cruise Sub 11 – 200 – eleven-person submarine, capable of diving to 200 meters

Super Sub

- Super Sub – 300 – three-person submarine, capable of diving to 300 meters

C-Explorer series

- C-Explorer 3 – three-person submersible, capable of diving to 300 meters
- C-Explorer 5 – five-person submersible, capable of diving to 200 meters

The following U-Boat Worx models are no longer in production.

- C-Quester 1 - one-person submarine
- C-Quester 2 – two-person submarine
- C-Quester 3 – three-person submarine
- C-Explorer 2 – two-person submarine

== Projects ==
70% of U-Boat Worx clients are private yacht owners who use their private submersible for exploration most of the time. Some of these clients make their private submersibles available for researchers. Other applications U-Boat Worx private submersibles are being used for are tourism and research. U-Boat Worx has solidified its position as the definitive industry standard within the cruise industry, having more than sixteen cruise submarines operational across various cruise lines. These submarines are prominently featured onboard to offer dive excursions.[5]

With over 60 submarines in operation, many clients of U-Boat Worx are private owners - as a result, the following list is not complete. Known U-Boat Worx submersibles are:

- Motor Yacht Legend - a Class 1 ice-breaking charter yacht, which is used on expeditions to remote destinations like Antarctica and Greenland.[7]
- The Russian Geographical Society used two U-Boat Worx submarines during a search and rescue operation - a C-Quester 2 and C-Explorer 3 - at the site of the fall of aircraft Tu-154 in Sochi. This model of sub is usually deployed for research expeditions.[8]
- Cruise Ship Genting Dream of Dream Cruises carries a C-Explorer 5 submarine on each side of the ship.[9]
- Cruise Ship Crystal Esprit, a high-end luxurious cruise ship operated by Crystal Cruises has a C-Explorer 3 onboard to entertain guests.[10]
- Cruise Ship Viking Polaris[11]
- Cruise Ship Viking Octantis[12]
- Cruise Ship Seabourn Pursuit[13]
- Cruise Ship Seabourn Venture[14]
- Aurora Trust Foundations partnered with SubSea Explorers and U-Boat Worx to explore ancient Roman shipwrecks.[15]
- Motor Yacht Sofia, a 42-meter Moonen Yacht carries a C-Quester 3.[16] Motor Yacht Milele, a 45-meter Hakvoort Yacht carries a NEMO.[17]
- Motor Yacht Cecilia, a 50-meter Wider Yacht carries a SYS3.[18] Motor Yacht Suri, a 63-meter explorer vessel carries a Cruise Sub 7.[19]
- Motor Yacht Arrow, a 47-meter San Lorenzo carries a NEMO.[20]
- Motor Yacht Lars, a 47-meter San Lorenzo carries a SYS3.[21]
- Motor Yacht Shinkai, a 55-meter Feadship carries a C-Researcher 3.[22]
- Motor Yacht Sandalphon, a 31-meter pocket explorer carries a NEMO.[23]

== Custom technology ==
MANTA Controller – to allow for supervised passenger steering U-Boat Worx developed the MANTA Controller. The pilot can hand over the controller to an untrained guest to let them navigate, under supervision.

MARLIN Controller – To make launch and recovery of the submersible easy and safe, U-Boat Worx developed the MARLIN Controller. This controller allows for wireless control and navigation on the surface without having a person inside the submarine.

U-Boat Worx was the first submarine manufacturer who applied lithium-ion batteries in her submarines with classification by DNV GL.

Pressure-tolerant battery technology – U-Boat Worx developed a pressure-tolerant battery system with an increased capacity of 350% when compared to lead-acid batteries used in non-U-Boat Worx submersibles. The technology has been tested to 13,000 feet and stores a total of 62 kWh on compact battery modules.
