= K-250 Submarine =

The K-250 submarine is usually configured to be a one-person personal submarine that is rated to go down to 250 fsw. The sub was designed by retired US Navy World War II submarine captain George Kittredge. It is a basic solid submarine that has been used by researchers, salvage divers, and private enthusiasts.

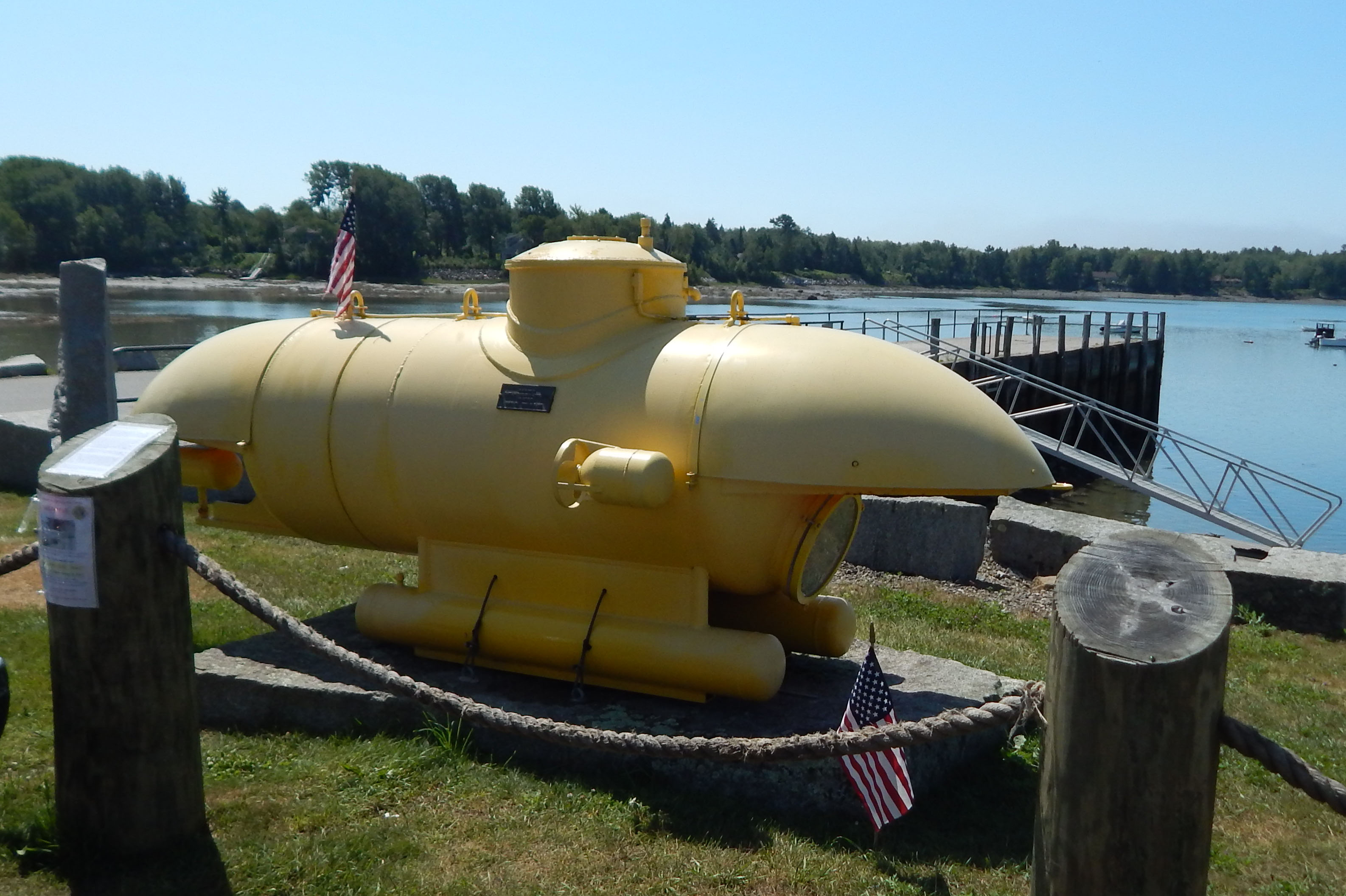
A K-250 personal submarine designed and built by George W. Kittredge. This submarine is on display in South Thomaston, Maine, as a memorial to Kittredge.

Kittredge Industries began building subs in 1970 at a plant in Warren, Maine. A number are still in use today. They generally weigh 2200 pounds when fully outfitted. Their hull is a quarter of an inch thick, and usually made out of A-36 mild steel, or ASME-516 Grade 70 high-carbon steel. They have twin keels, that also act as skids so the sub does not need to be placed in a cradle. The K-250 has a 150-pound drop weight, that can be released to make the sub float to the surface if all the other systems have failed. The drop weight is made up of a metal tray and a number of lead bricks. If released, having the lead broken up into smaller bricks makes them easier to recover by a SCUBA diver if they are not too deep.

The plans call for the sub to have three 12 volt car batteries, and two SCUBA tanks, used primarily to blow the water out of the front and rear soft ballast tanks. These external soft ballast tanks are usually made out of a fiberglass composite or steel. Some K-250s have a single action grabber arm in the front.
