= George Kittredge (Navy captain) =

US Navy (1918–2010)

George William Kittredge
- Born: May 26, 1918; Washington, D.C., U.S.
- Died: February 23, 2010 (aged 91); South Thomaston, Maine, U.S.
- Occupation: US Navy (1940–62),
- Years active: 1940+
- Known for: submarine commander, personal submersible designs
- Notable work: K-250

George William Kittredge (1918–2010) was a retired United States Navy captain who commanded submarines during and after World War II, including USS Grouper, Sterlet, and Trout (SS-566). After retiring from the Navy in 1962, he served in the Maine State Legislature and as a trustee of the Maine Maritime Academy before founding Kittredge Industries in 1970, for which he is credited as the father of the personal submersibles industry.

== Early and personal life ==
Kittredge was born on May 26, 1918, in Washington, D.C. to Scott F. and Henriette Green Kittredge. He attended the United States Naval Academy and graduated in 1940 with a degree in electrical engineering. He married Gayle (née Clark) on May 26, 1944.

== Career ==
After receiving his commission, Ensign Kittredge was assigned to USS Chicago, which participated in the Battle of the Coral Sea, the Guadalcanal campaign and Battle of Savo Island, where the ship was damaged and he volunteered for submarine duty, serving seven war patrols aboard USS Sunfish and Haddock before finishing the war as the commander of Grouper.

After the war, Kittredge served as the navigator for Admiral Richard E. Byrd on his 1946 Antarctic expedition, commander of Sterlet and Trout, and in various diplomatic and administrative roles. He retired from the Navy in 1962.

For the 102nd legislature of 1965/1966 Kittredge was a member of the Maine House of Representatives, representing South Thomaston in Knox County.

Kittredge Industries was founded in 1970 to design and manufacture midget submarines, completing 49 submersibles before manufacturing was wound down in 1988. Kittredge's designs included the K-250 and K-350, named for their maximum rated depth (in feet); he is known as the "father of personal submersibles".
