= Triton Submarines =

American company that designs and manufactures private submersibles

Triton Submarines LLC
- Industry: Submarine manufacturing
- Founded: 2008 (18 years ago)
- Founders: L. Bruce Jones, Patrick Lahey
- Headquarters: Sebastian, Florida, United States
- Key people: Patrick Lahey (CEO); Ron Stamm (Operations Director)
- Products: Commercial and personal submarines
- Number of employees: 50+ (2024)
- Subsidiaries: Triton Submarines EMEA S.L. (Barcelona, Spain)
- Website: tritonsubs.com

Triton Submarines LLC is an American company that designs and manufactures submersibles for research, filming, deep-ocean exploration, and the superyacht and high-end tourism sectors.

Triton is a bespoke manufacturer and, as of August 2023, fewer than twenty-five submersibles have been delivered since the company's founding.

Submersibles are built-to-order, with the company historically delivering 1 to 2 subs per year. Triton indicates that current build capacity allows for up to four subs to be manufactured simultaneously and the company has announced plans to expand capacity further.

Triton submersibles cost between US$5 million and $40 million.

In 2019, Triton relocated its headquarters and Florida manufacturing facility from Vero Beach, Florida to Sebastian, Florida.

== Investors ==
In 2010, Bridgewater Associates billionaire Ray Dalio approached Lahey, Jones and Triton to build him a personal submersible. This relationship would later prove crucial, as less than two years later Triton faced what CEO Lahey describes as a financial "extinction event" due to supply chain problems with the business. Dalio extended the company an emergency loan in 2012, which ultimately saved the company.

In 2018, Dalio co-founded OceanX and contacted Triton to build a second submersible to support that group's operations.

In December 2022, Dalio and James Cameron were reported to have become investors and minority shareholders of the company.

Triton CEO Patrick Lahey has indicated that he had known Cameron from as early as 2001, and had a relationship with Dalio as a customer in both 2010 and through OceanX in 2018.

As these were private transactions, neither the percentages of ownership held by the shareholders, nor the valuation of Triton at the time of the transactions, have been disclosed.

As a Florida private company, the Triton shareholders are not a matter of public record.

== Notable projects ==
=== Aston Martin ===
In 2017, Triton announced an ultra-luxury submersible in collaboration with Aston Martin called Project Neptune.

Utilizing the Triton 1650/3 Low Profile submersible as its certified platform, and sharing design language with the Aston Martin Valkyrie sports car, the Project Neptune submersible featured an exclusive interior, improved hydrodynamics, and powerful thrusters for increased speed and maneuverability.

=== DSV Limiting Factor ===
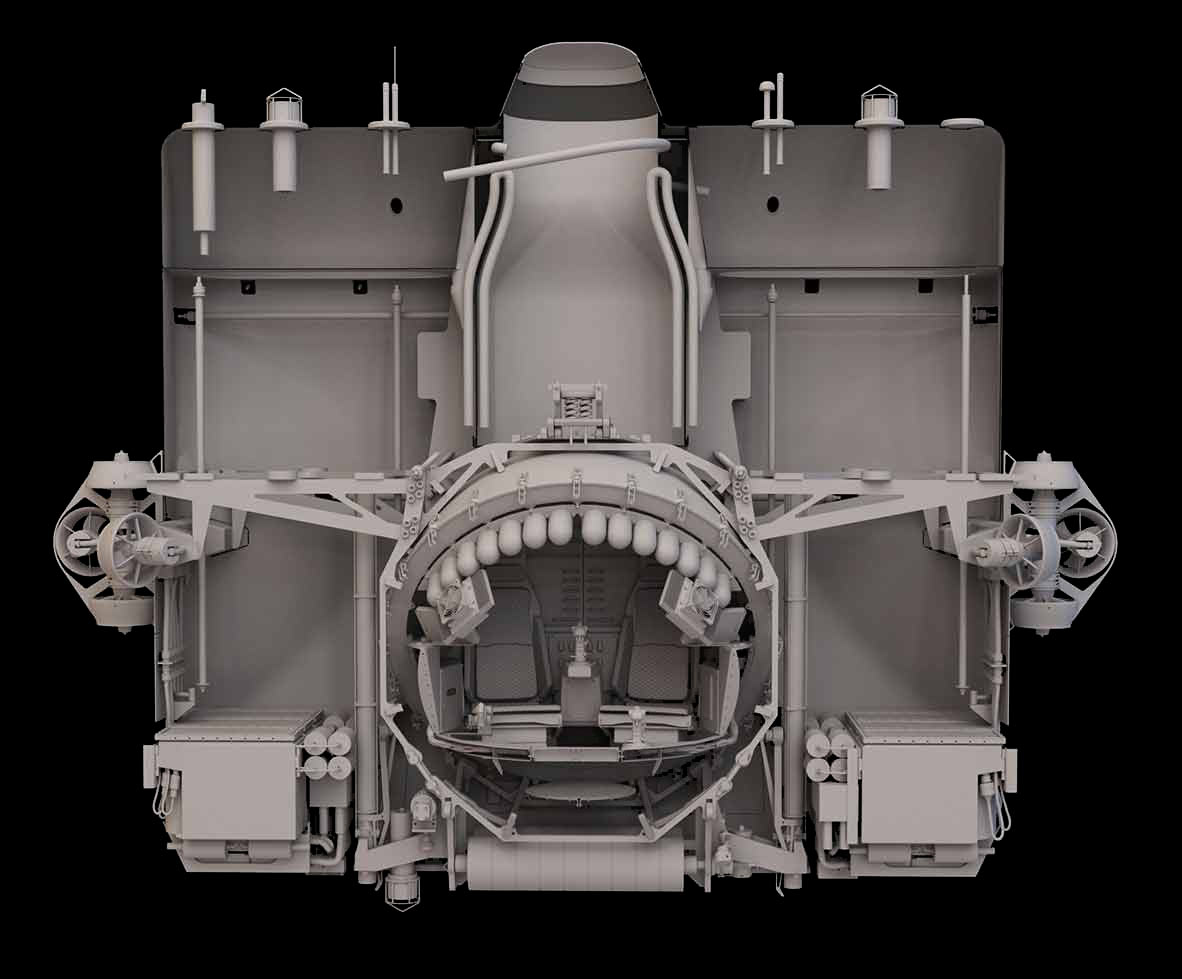
Cutaway of Triton's Limiting Factor, classed full-ocean-depth submersible

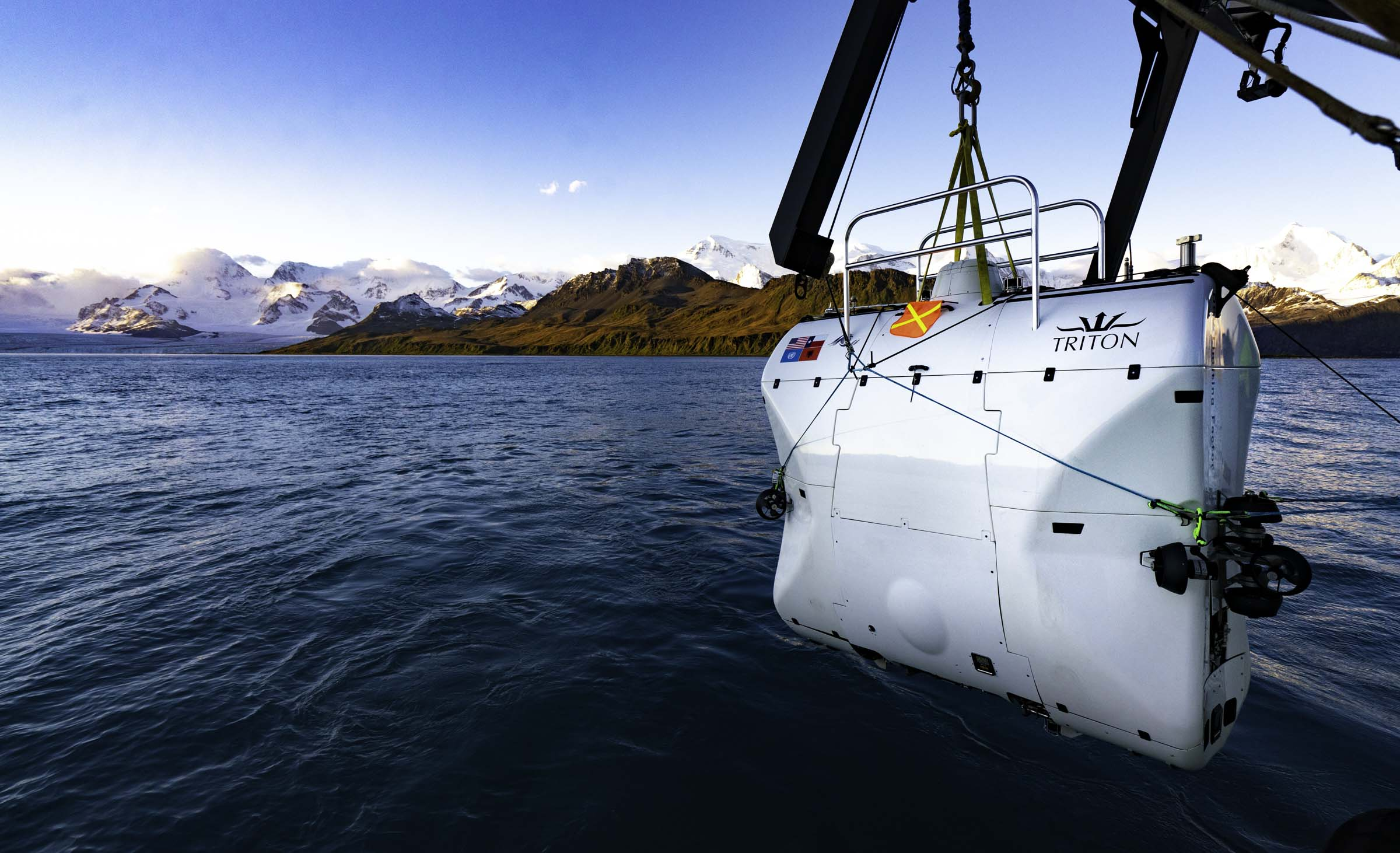
DSV Limiting Factor, pictured during sea trials

In 2019, Triton completed the design and manufacture of the DSV Limiting Factor, a full-ocean-depth Triton model 36000/2. The DSV Limiting Factor became the first commercially certified full-ocean-depth crewed submersible, a significant milestone for the company.

The Limiting Factor was first operated by Victor Vescovo, and, as of 2019, holds the record for deepest crewed descent (to the revised depth of 10,925 m (35,843 ft) ±4 m (13 ft), in the Challenger Deep).

In 2022, DSV Limiting Factor was sold to Inkfish, an ocean exploration and research group owned by Gabe Newell and renamed Bakunawa after the Filipino mythological creature Bakunawa.

=== Abyssal Explorer ===
In May 2024, it was announced that US real estate billionaire, and private space astronaut, Larry Connor, commissioned the design and building of a $20 million submersible, the Triton 4000/2 Abyssal Explorer, and planned to voyage to the wreck of the OceanGate Titan submersible implosion with Triton Submarines co-founder Patrick Lahey to prove that a journey to the site is possible, and safe, and that the industry had made improvements in the wake of the OceanGate implosion.
