= Submarine navigation =

Skills and tech involved in submarine navigation

Submarine navigation underwater requires special skills and technologies not needed by surface ships. The challenges of underwater navigation have become more important as submarines spend more time underwater, travelling greater distances and at higher speed. Military submarines travel underwater in an environment of total darkness with neither windows nor lights. Operating in stealth mode, they cannot use their active sonar systems to ping ahead for underwater hazards such as undersea mountains, drilling rigs or other submarines. Surfacing to obtain navigational fixes is precluded by pervasive anti-submarine warfare detection systems such as radar and satellite surveillance. Antenna masts and antenna-equipped periscopes can be raised to obtain navigational signals but in areas of heavy surveillance, only for a few seconds or minutes; current radar technology can detect even a slender periscope while submarine shadows may be plainly visible from the air.

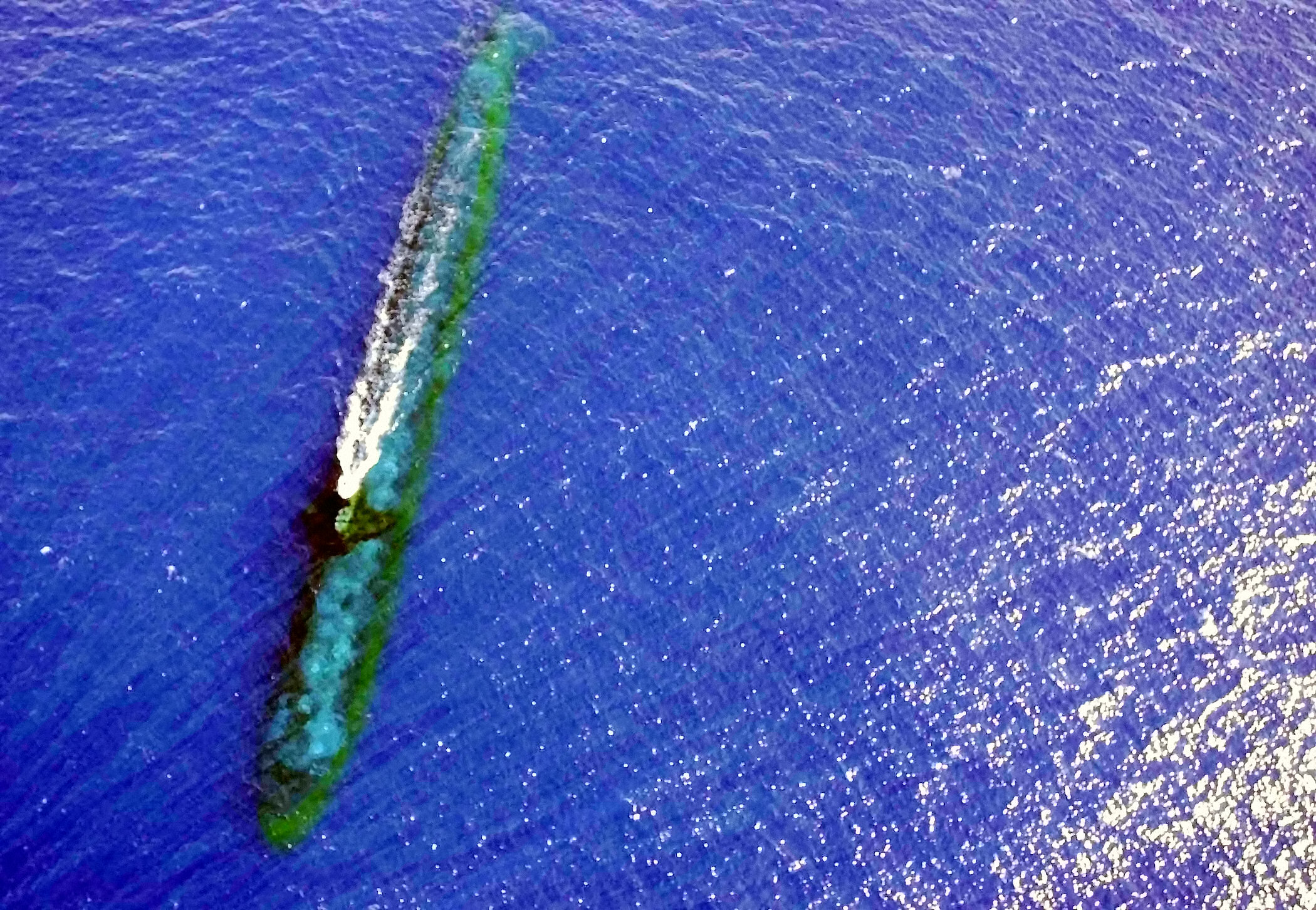
A submarine at periscope depth risks visual or radar detection

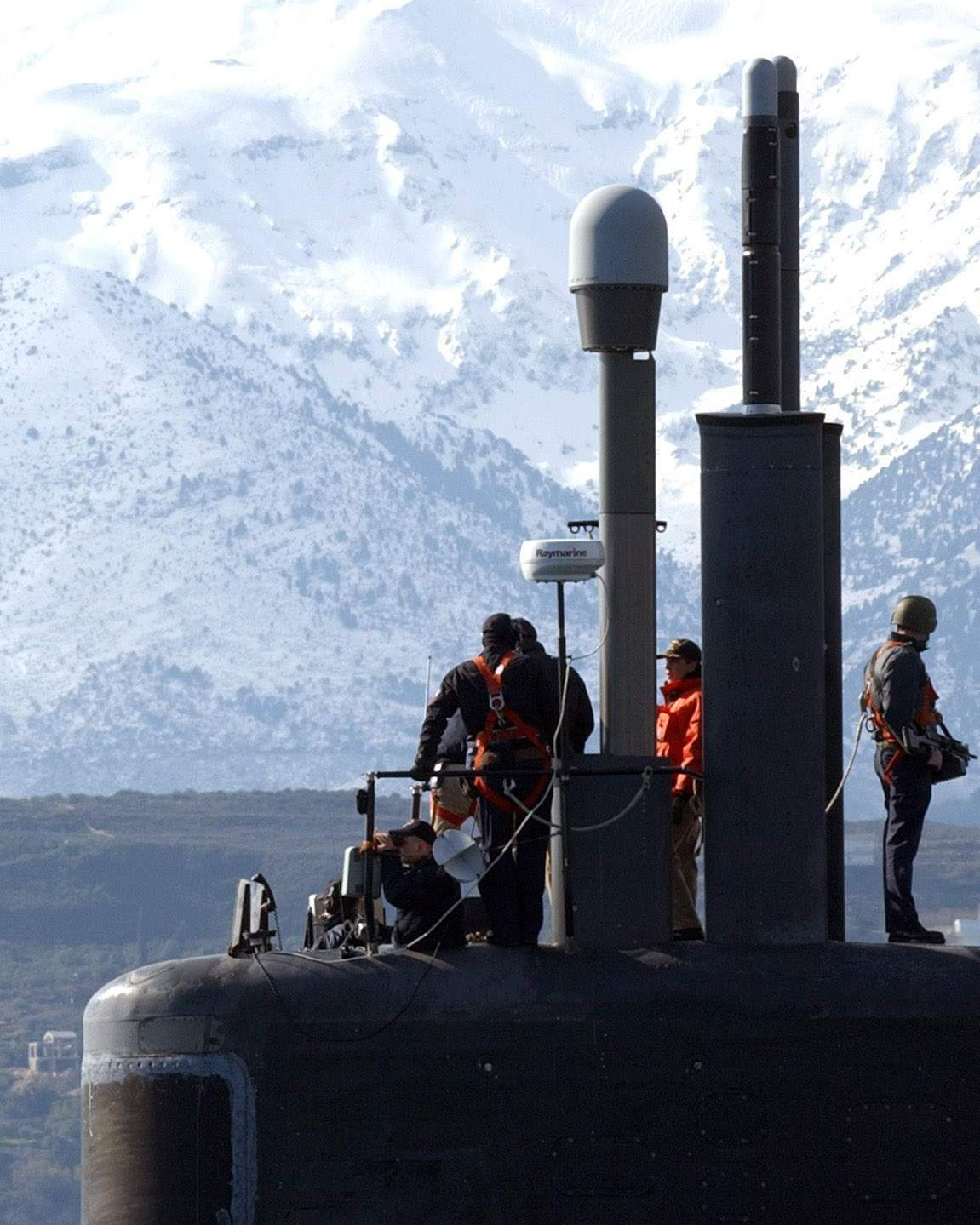
Submarines can raise various antenna masts, radar masts and periscopes to facilitate communications and navigation

== Navigational technologies ==
Surfaced submarines entering and leaving port navigate similarly to traditional ships but with a few extra considerations because most of the boat rides below the waterline, making them hard for other vessels to see and identify. Submarines carry an inertial navigation system, which measures the boat’s motion and constantly updates position. Because it does not rely on radio signals or celestial sightings, it allows the boat to navigate while remaining hidden under the surface. To maintain accuracy, the submarine must periodically update its position using outside navigational radio signals. From the 1960s to the 1990s, Transit satellites and LORAN shore stations provided those signals. GPS has now replaced both.

=== Surface and near-surface navigation ===
On the surface or at periscope depth, submarines have used these methods to fix their position:

- Satellite navigation:
  - Global positioning system (GPS)—by entering waypoints internally, able to navigate at a more precise level.
  - NAVSAT
- Terrestrial radio-based navigation systems; largely superseded by satellite systems
  - LORAN—Low frequency radio hyperbolic navigation system, no longer in use
  - CHAYKA, the Russian counterpart of LORAN
  - OMEGA, Western very low frequency global-range radio hyperbolic navigation system, no longer in use
  - Alpha, the Russian counterpart of the Omega Navigation System
- Celestial navigation using the periscope, or sextant—seldom used anymore due to advancement in technology
- Radar navigation; radar signals are easily detected so radar is normally only used in friendly waters entering and exiting ports. With the implementation of a more advanced radar system, many new techniques have been implemented in this process.
- Active sonar; like radar, active sonar systems are readily detected, so active sonar is usually used only entering and exiting ports.
- Pilotage—in coastal and internal waters, surfaced submarines rely on the standard system of navigational aids (buoys, navigational markers, lighthouses, etc.), utilizing the periscopes for obtaining lines of position to plot a triangulation fix.
- Voyage Management System—referred to as the VMS, utilizes digital charts with other external sources fed in, to establish the ship's position. Other information may also be entered in manually in establishing a high quality fix or position.

=== Deep water navigation ===
At depths below periscope depth submarines determine their position using:

- Dead reckoning course information obtained from the ship's gyrocompass, measured speed and estimates of local ocean currents, this could also be considered an estimated position as long as the ocean current is computed in.
- Inertial navigation system is an estimated position source, utilizing acceleration, deceleration, and pitch and roll for computing.
- Bottom contour navigation may be used in areas where detailed hydrographic data has been charted and there is adequate variation in sea floor topography. Fathometer depth measurements are compared to charted depth patterns. This method utilizes active sonar however, that may reveal their presence.

== See also ==
- Bearing (angle) – Angle between two objects
- Passive sonar – Acoustic sensing method
- Diver navigation – Underwater navigation by scuba divers
- Underwater acoustic positioning system – System for tracking and navigation of underwater vehicles or divers using acoustic signals
