= Personal Submersibles Organization =

The Personal Submersibles Organization (PSUBS) is an internet based society for hobbyists interested in small privately owned crewed or uncrewed submarines.

== History ==
In 1996, sporadic discussions about submarines in the rec.boats.building electronic newsgroup were moved to private email between four primary participants. Jon Wallace and Ray Keefer, two original participants, decided to create a website and set up a listserver. In February 1997 the first archiving of PSUBS discussions began with a total of six people registered.

In October 1997, the domain name PSUBS.ORG was secured for the organization. Wallace and Keefer performed moderator duties and also provided technical expertise, plus funding, to keep the web server and listserver operating.

In 2007 Wallace and Keefer incorporated the organization under the name PSUBS LLC. In 2009, PSUBS began offering formal memberships to participants .
