= List of largest companies in Pakistan =

Following is a list of largest companies in Pakistan:

== Conglomerates ==
Group name	Headquarters	Publicly listed companies	Reference(s)
Adamjee Group	Karachi	–	
Atlas Group	Lahore	Atlas Honda, Honda Atlas, Atlas Battery, Atlas Insurance	
AKD Group	Karachi	AKD Hospitality, AKD Securities	
Arif Habib Group	Karachi	Arif Habib Limited, Aisha Steel Mills, Fatima Fertilizer Company, Javedan, Power Cement, Safe Mix Concrete	
Askari Group	Rawalpindi	Askari General Insurance, Askari Life Assurance	
Bibojee Group	Karachi	Bannu Woollen Mills, Gammon Pakistan, Ghandhara Automobiles Limited, Ghandhara Industries Limited, Ghandhara Tyre, Janana De Malucho Textile Mills, The Universal Insurance Company	
Dawood Group	Karachi	Engro Holdings, Dawood Lawrencepur	
Descon	Lahore	Altern Energy, Descon Oxychem	
Fauji Group	Rawalpindi	Askari Bank, Fauji Cement, Fauji Fertilizer, Fauji Foods, Mari Petroleum	
Hashoo Group	Karachi	Pakistan Services Limited, Exide Batteries Pakistan	
Habib Group	Karachi	Agriauto Industries, HabibMetro, Habib Insurance, Habib Rice, Habib Sugar Mills, Shabbir Tiles, Toyota Indus, Thal Limited	
Lakson Group	Karachi	Century Insurance, Century Paper, Colgate-Palmolive Pakistan, Merit Packaging	
Lucky Group	Karachi	Gadoon Textile Mills, Lucky Cement, Lucky Core Industries	
JS Group	Karachi	BankIslami, JS Bank, Jahangir Siddiqui & Co.	
Nishat Group	Lahore	Adamjee Insurance, Adamjee Life Assurance, DG Cement, Lalpir Power, MCB Bank, MCB Funds, Nishat Mills Limited, Nishat Chunian Power, Nishat Power Limited, Pakgen Power	
Packages Group	Lahore	Packages Limited	
Saigol Group	Lahore	Maple Leaf Cement, Pak Elektron Limited, Kohinoor Energy Limited, Kohinoor Industries Limited, Kohinoor Mills Limited, Kohinoor Power Company Limited, Kohinoor Textile Mills Limited, Saritow Spinning Mills Limited	

== By market capitalization ==
Below is the list of largest companies by market capitalization based on the year-end closing, 31 December 2025:

Rank	Name	Market cap (US$)	Headquarters	Industry	Reference(s)
1	Oil & Gas Development Company	Rs. 1.398 trillion (US$5.0 billion)	Islamabad	Petroleum	
2	United Bank Limited	Rs. 1.148 trillion (US$4.1 billion)	Karachi	Banking	
3	Meezan Bank	Rs. 1.034 trillion (US$3.7 billion)	Karachi	Banking	
4	Mari Energies	Rs. 798.05 billion (US$2.9 billion)	Islamabad	Petroleum	
5	Fauji Fertilizer Company	Rs. 791.51 billion (US$2.8 billion)	Rawalpindi	Fertilizer	
6	Lucky Cement	Rs. 647.6 billion (US$2.3 billion)	Karachi	Cement	
7	Pakistan Petroleum Limited	Rs. 645.09 billion (US$2.3 billion)	Karachi	Petroleum	
8	Habib Bank Limited	Rs. 477.89 billion (US$1.7 billion)	Karachi	Banking	
9	MCB Bank	Rs. 477.2 billion (US$1.7 billion)	Lahore	Banking	
10	National Bank of Pakistan	Rs. 402 billion (US$1.4 billion)	Karachi	Banking	
11	Pakistan Tobacco Company	Rs. 356.71 billion (US$1.3 billion)	Islamabad	Tobacco	
12	PTCL	Rs. 355.16 billion (US$1.3 billion)	Islamabad	Telecommunications	
13	Nestlé Pakistan	Rs. 341.07 billion (US$1.2 billion)	Lahore	Fast-moving consumer goods	
14	Fatima Fertilizer Company	Rs. 329.07 billion (US$1.2 billion)	Lahore	Fertilizer	
15	Engro Holdings	Rs. 2320.15 billion (US$8.3 billion)	Karachi	Energy	
16	Colgate-Palmolive Pakistan	Rs. 295.29 billion (US$1.1 billion)	Karachi	Fast-moving consumer goods	
17	Bestway Cement	Rs. 289.19 billion (US$1.0 billion)	Islamabad	Cement	
18	Hub Power Company	Rs. 273.39 billion (US$980 million)	Karachi	Power generation	
19	Standard Chartered Pakistan	Rs. 261.33 billion (US$930 million)	Karachi	Banking	
20	Engro Fertilizers	Rs. 243.84 billion (US$870 million)	Karachi	Fertilizer	
21	Pakistan Oilfields Limited	Rs. 209.88 billion (US$750 million)	Rawalpindi	Petroleum	
22	Atlas Honda	Rs. 198.08 billion (US$710 million)	Karachi	Automotive	
23	K-Electric	Rs. 197.45 billion (US$710 million)	Karachi	Power generation	
24	Allied Bank Limited	Rs. 194.06 billion (US$690 million)	Lahore	Banking	
25	Systems Limited	Rs. 192.75 billion (US$690 million)	Lahore	Information technology	
