= Fauji =

Fauji means "soldier" (from "fauj", the Arabic term for army) in Hindi-Urdu and other languages, and may refer to:

== Entertainment ==
- Fauji (TV series), 1989 Indian TV series
  - Fauji 2, 2024 Indian TV series, sequel to the 1989 series
- Fauji (1995 film), Indian Indian film
- Fauji Band, an Indian band

== Companies ==
- Fauji Foundation, Pakistan
- Fauji Fertilizer Company Limited, Pakistan
- Fauji Fertilizer Bin Qasim, Pakistan
- Fauji Meat, Pakistan
- Fauji Foods, Pakistan
- Fauji Power, Pakistan

== Hospitals ==
- Fauji Foundation Hospital, Lahore, Pakistan

== See also ==
- Foja (disambiguation)
- Fauzi, a name
- Fauzi (film), a 2027 Indian film by Hanu Raghavapudi
- Faujdar, a Mughal military title
- Fauj, a 1994 Indian film
- Fauja Singh, Indian athlete
- Fauja Singh (Sikh leader)
- Fauja Singh Sarari, Indian politician
