= Military Inc. =

2007 book by Ayesha Siddiqa

Military Inc
- First edition
- Author: Ayesha Siddiqa
- Genre: Military Industrial Complex
- Publisher: Pluto Press
- Publication date: May 2007
- Publication place: Pakistan
- Pages: 292
- ISBN: 978-0-19-547495-4

Military Inc.: Inside Pakistan's Military Economy (Urdu: اقتصادیاتِ عسکری پاکستان) is a book about the Pakistan military's economic activities and its consequences, written by Ayesha Siddiqa.

== Content ==
The book, divided into ten chapters, discusses the Pakistan military's economic empire and its political, economic, and social effect on the country. The author uses the term “Milbus” to refer to “military capital that is used for the personal benefit of the military fraternity, especially the officer cadre, but is neither recorded nor part of the defense budget.” She puts the cost of this Milbus to at least $20 billion. The following is a brief description of the content chapter wise:

- Chapter 1: Defines six distinct categories of military-civilian relationship in the world and explaining each with a brief case study of different countries.
- Chapter 2: Explains the political growth of the Pakistan Army. its mandate, organizational structure and ethnic composition.
- Chapter 3: Highlights the growth of financial interests of the officer cadre of the army.
- Chapter 4: Outlines the command and control structure of the economic empire, and various methods used to exploit economic resources.
- Chapter 5: Discusses the growth of military business activities during the period 1954–1977, when it expanded its stake in agriculture, manufacturing, and service industries.
- Chapter 6: Expansion of military business during the period 1977–2005, setting up of institutions like Bahria Foundation and Shaheen Foundation, entry in finance and banking sector.
- Chapter 7: Discusses urban and rural land acquisition of armed forces.
- Chapter 8: Discusses the welfare program for serving and retired Military personnel, inequitable distribution of resources that shows bias towards smaller provinces and ethnic minorities.
- Chapter 9: Analyzes the financial cost of the military economy.
- Chapter 10: Looks at the effects of military's economy on its professionalism, and the politics of the state and the conclusion.

== Reception ==
The book caused a stir as it discussed a subject considered taboo in a country ruled for half of its time since independence, by the military. The author on the launch of the book said, "Over the past three years a lot of my friends have advised me not to publish this book. They think I have suicidal tendencies." Talat Hussain, a political analyst, said "Ms Siddiqa is a courageous researcher. This area has always been considered a sacred cow in our society." Inter Services Public Relations (ISPR) released a booklet titled ‘Information Brief’, countering the figures and facts presented by the author in her book.

== See also ==
- Fauji Foundation
- Army Welfare Trust
- Bahria Foundation
- Shaheen Foundation
- Military–industrial complex
