= Defence Housing Authority =

Pakistani residential and commercial development organisation

- Type: Public
- Industry: Real estate Gated community
- Founder: Pakistan Army
- Headquarters: Islamabad, Pakistan
- Products: Town; Commercial area Plots; House; Villa; Restaurants; Hotel; Golf clubs Hospitals
- Owner: Government of Pakistan

Defence Housing Authority (DHA; Urdu: اداره خانه سازی ڈیفنس), also called the Pakistan Defence Officers Housing Authority (PDOHA), is a Pakistan Army-administered real-estate developer that governs housing and municipal services for Defence neighbourhoods across Pakistan. The Defence Secretary is its chairman and it is managed by the Pakistan Army, just as the other government housing societies are managed by the respective state institutions. Primarily aimed to develop housing for retired military personnel in the 1970s, now most of the properties in its new projects are owned by civilians while a portion of total plots is allotted (not given) to armed forces officers, families of martyrs and other employees.

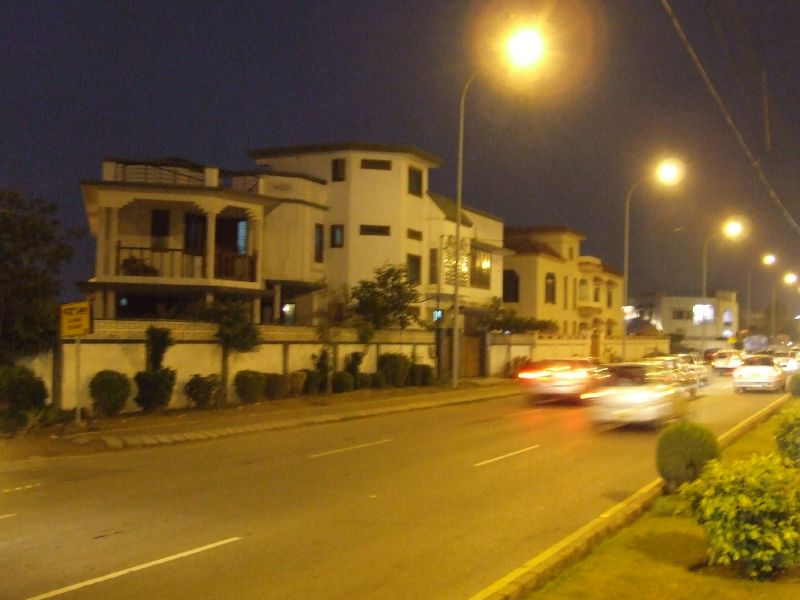
Residential neighborhood in DHA

DHA allows the construction of houses and commercial buildings.

== Localities ==
- DHA Karachi formed under Presidential Order number 7 of 1980 later approved by National Assembly.
- DHA Lahore formed under Extraordinary Gazette of Pakistan Part-I dated 19 September 2002
- DHA Islamabad formed under Gazette of Pakistan dated 19 March 2013 passed by Parliament Act no XII of 2013.
- DHA Peshawar
- DHA Quetta
  - DHA Quetta is strategically situated on RCD Highway, Kuchlak, bridging Quetta city and northern Baluchistan spanning 4,000 ha (10,000 acres).
- DHA Multan
  - DHA Multan is South Punjab largest housing project with an area of 3,800 ha (9,500 acres) in first phase. First Phase has 26 sectors offering 379.3 m^{2} (4,083 sq ft) to 2,023.4 m^{2} (21,780 sq ft) residential plots and 1,011.7 m^{2} (10,890 sq ft) to Over 0.40 ha (1 acre) Commercial Plots. It is home to Pakistan's first championship signature Golf Course designed by Sir Nick Faldo. It has four entrances giving the community much needed 360 degree connectivity.
- DHA Gujranwala
- DHA Hyderabad
- DHA Bahawalpur
- DHA City Karachi
- DHA Valley Islamabad
- DHA Ghazi Terbela

== See also ==
- Army Welfare Trust
- Fauji Foundation
- Bahria Foundation
- Shaheen Foundation
- Military–industrial complex
