= Mari Energies =

Pakistani energy company based in Islamabad

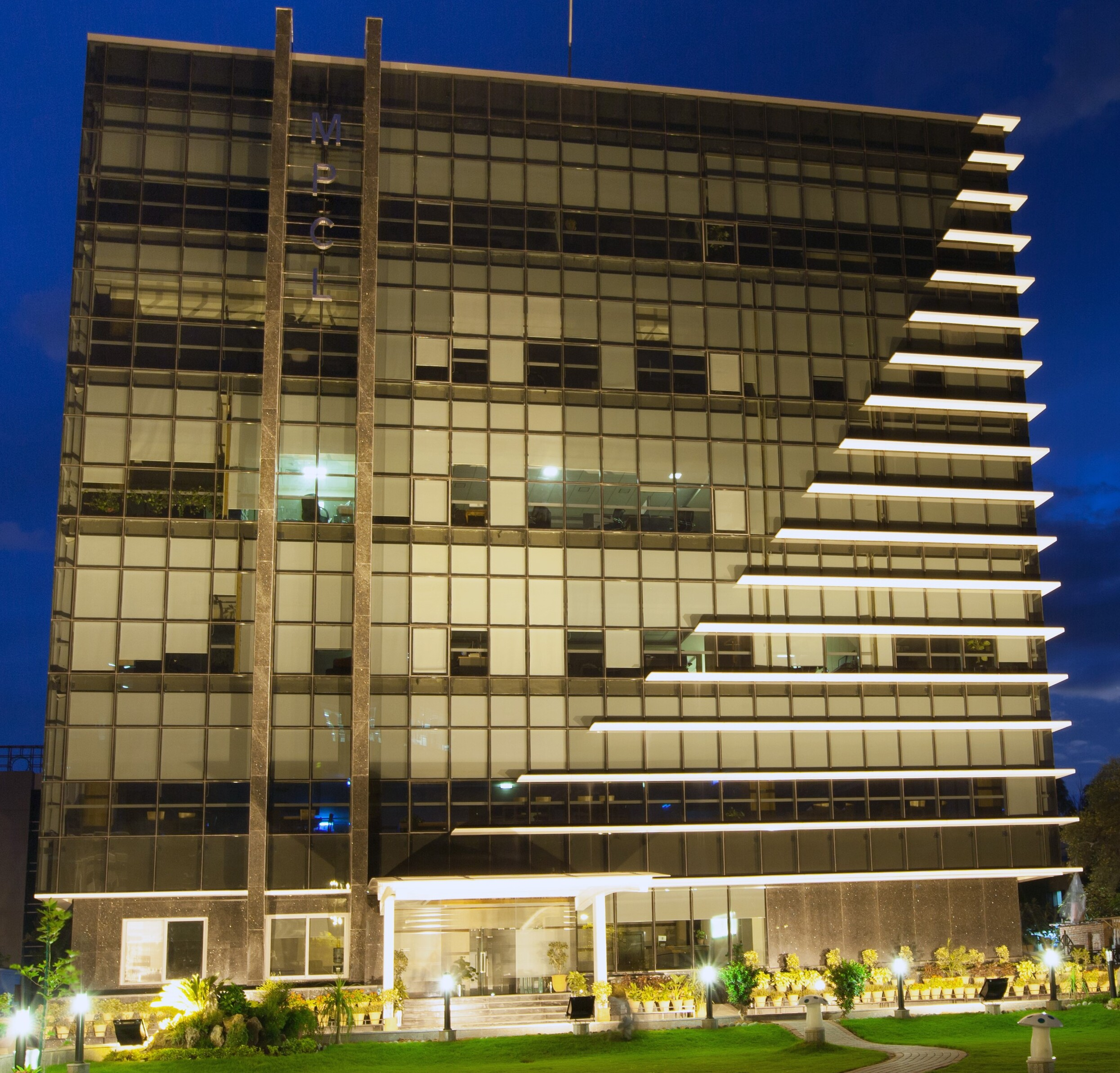
- Mari Energies' headquarters in Mauve Area, Islamabad
- Formerly: Mari Gas Company Limited (1984–2012); Mari Petroleum Company Limited (2012–2025)
- Type: Public
- Traded as: PSX: MARI; KSE 100 component KSE 30 component
- Industry: Energy; Oil and Gas
- Founded: 1984; 42 years ago
- Headquarters: Islamabad, Pakistan
- Key people: Anwar Ali Hyder (chairman); Faheem Haider (CEO)
- Products: Oil, Natural Gas, Condensate, Liquefied Petroleum Gas
- Revenue: ▼ Rs. 177.10 billion (US$630 million) (2025)
- Operating income: ▼ Rs. 81.12 billion (US$290 million) (2025)
- Net income: ▼ Rs. 65.14 billion (US$230 million) (2025)
- Total assets: ▲ Rs. 422.27 billion (US$1.5 billion) (2025)
- Total equity: ▲ Rs. 271.65 billion (US$970 million) (2025)
- Owner: Fauji Foundation (40%); OGDCL (20%); Government of Pakistan (19.99%)
- Number of employees: 1,653 (2025)
- Website: marienergies.com.pk
- Footnotes; Financials as of 30 June 2025

Mari Energies Limited, formerly Mari Petroleum Company Limited, and commonly known as Mari (Urdu pronunciation: [ˈmaː.ri] MAH-ree), is a Pakistani energy company based in Islamabad. It primarily operates the Mari gas field in Sindh, which was discovered in 1957 and was run by affiliates of Esso until 1983. It is controlled by the Fauji Foundation, which holds a 40 percent stake, and is listed on the Pakistan Stock Exchange.

== History ==
=== Pak-Stanvac and Esso (1954–1984) ===
In September 1954, the Government of Pakistan and the Standard Vacuum Oil Company (Stanvac) set up the Pakistan Stanvac Petroleum Project, known as Pak-Stanvac, under an agreement between them. While searching for oil, the venture discovered gas at Mari, near Daharki in northern Sindh, in 1957. Mari lies about 105 kilometres (65 mi) southeast of the Sui gas field. By 1960, the venture had completed three wells in the field's limestone reservoir, which lay at a depth of about 820 metres (2,700 ft). About 30 percent of the gas was non-combustible, and it had a heating value of about 750 Btu. In 1960, Stanvac's two parent companies, Standard Oil of New Jersey and Socony Mobil, agreed to divide its assets between them under a settlement with the United States Department of Justice. By the early 1970s, Esso and Mobil together controlled 75 percent of the Mari field.

Under a 1965 agreement with the government, Esso Standard Eastern was to build a $26 million complex that would turn Mari gas into ammonia and about 173,000 tons of urea a year. Gas began to flow from the field in 1967. The resulting urea plant of Esso Pakistan Fertilizer Company at Daharki started up in 1968 and remained the only consumer of Mari gas for about a decade. In 1976, Esso Eastern agreed to let the government buy its shares in Pakistan Refinery and its fuel-marketing business, with the proceeds going into more wells at Mari. Under the deal, Esso Eastern took a 51 percent share of the field and the government the remaining 49 percent.

Esso Eastern continued to operate the field and manage its development. With the government's approval, it set aside gas reserves for two new fertilizer projects, Pak-Saudi Fertilizer and the Fauji Fertilizer Company. Three fertilizer plants, at Daharki, Mirpur Mathelo and Goth Machhi, were taking all of the field's gas by 1983. Esso Eastern's stake in the field passed to the Fauji Foundation on May 5, 1983, during the military regime of Zia-ul-Haq.

=== Mari Gas Company (1984–2012) ===
The Fauji Foundation incorporated Mari Gas Company Limited on December 4, 1984, to take over the field from Pak-Stanvac. The company took the foundation into the oil and gas industry. Until 1994, the foundation and the federal government each owned 40 percent of it, and the state-owned Oil and Gas Development Corporation (OGDC) owned 20 percent. Its gas was priced under the Mari Gas Wellhead Price Agreement of 1985, a cost-plus formula that guaranteed shareholders a 22.5 percent return on equity. The government kept the gap between the low price paid to the company and the higher rates its customers were charged, collecting it through taxes and surcharges.

In November 1985, the International Finance Corporation (IFC) and five foreign banks agreed to lend $39.9 million towards a $78.1 million expansion. The plan was to drill 27 new production wells and lift the field's output by half, to 300 million cubic feet a day, with the additional gas going by pipeline to Guddu Thermal Power Station. A fifth development phase, which cost $47.9 million and for which the IFC approved $20 million in its 1992 financial year, aimed to lift production from 300 to 402 million cubic feet a day.

In 1994, Mari Gas was listed on the Karachi Stock Exchange, following an initial public offering at PKR 25 per share. The government sold 4.2 million shares to the public in the IPO. In 2001, the guaranteed return was raised to 30 percent, with scope to reach 45 percent as production grew. In 2002, Mari Gas, Total, and their contracting partners, Petronas, OMV, and the Oil & Gas Development Company, signed Production Sharing Agreements (PSAs) with the Government of Pakistan.

Mari Gas also began to explore outside the Mari field. It received the Sujawal block in southern Sindh in June 2006 and found gas and condensate there with its first well in 2010. In 2011, it struck crude oil at the Halini well in the Karak block, in which Hungary's MOL held a 40 percent interest.

=== Mari Petroleum Company (2012–2025) ===
In November 2012, the company was renamed as Mari Petroleum Company Limited. It made further finds at the Sujjal-1 well in the Sujawal block in 2014 and at the Kalabagh well in Mianwali District, also in the Karak block, in 2015.

In 2014, the federal cabinet's Economic Coordination Committee (ECC) replaced the cost-plus formula, with effect from July 2014, by a wellhead price tied to international crude oil prices. Under a five-year schedule, the price was to rise from $0.37 to $2.17 per million British thermal units. The old cap on dividends was to stay in force for a further ten years, until June 2024, so that the rest of the profit could be reinvested. In 2017, the Federal Investigation Agency (FIA) opened an inquiry into allegations that the change had cost the national exchequer about Rs 600 billion.

The government began preparing in 2017 to sell its 18.39 per cent stake through a secondary offering on the Pakistan Stock Exchange, and the federal cabinet approved the sale in November 2018. The sale stalled after the petroleum ministry asked the National Accountability Bureau and the FIA for advice on the 2014 pricing change, and the ministry later asked for the company to be taken off the privatisation list. In February 2021 the ECC, overruling objections from the prime minister's special assistant on petroleum and the finance secretary, backed lifting the dividend cap from July 2020 and passed the matter to the federal cabinet for a final decision. The company was taken off the active privatisation programme by the Cabinet Committee on Privatisation in December 2021.

In 2020, Mari established a mining company. In August 2020, Faheem Haider was appointed as managing director and chief executive. The company had become the operator of the Waziristan block in North Waziristan in 2017, and its first well there, drilled from June 2021, found gas in the Lockhart formation. Eight of its employees and five Frontier Corps soldiers were killed in the area during the work. In August 2021, ADNOC awarded exploration rights to Offshore Block 5, off Abu Dhabi, to Pakistan International Oil Limited (PIOL). PIOL is owned in equal shares by Mari, Pakistan Petroleum, the Oil and Gas Development Company Limited (OGDCL) and Government Holdings, and it committed $304.7 million to exploration.

At the Mari field, the company found gas with its Mari Ghazij-1 well in 2023 and drilled horizontal wells in the Habib Rahi limestone reservoir to sustain production. Its market value passed US$1 billion in December 2023. In 2024, it set up a subsidiary with Rs10 billion in equity to build data centres in Pakistan.

=== Mari Energies (2025–present) ===
Its present name, Mari Energies Limited, took effect on January 7, 2025. Gas production from the Shewa discovery in the Waziristan block began on March 23, 2025. Between February and April 2025, the block's Spinwam-1 well tested four separate discoveries, in the Samanasuk, Kawagarh, Hangu and Lockhart formations. By April 2026, the well was in production.

In April 2025, Mari Energies, OGDCL and Pakistan Petroleum also signed an agreement with Turkish Petroleum (TPAO) to bid jointly in Pakistan's offshore licensing round. In June 2025, PIOL signed a production concession for Offshore Block 5, under which it holds 40 per cent and ADNOC, which leads operations, holds 60 per cent. In 2026, the two partners began an oil production project for the block, which ADNOC, as project leader, was taking forward through a front-end engineering design competition. In a national bidding round in February 2026, Mari Energies won the operatorship of six onshore blocks, five of them with a full working interest. In March 2026, its Shams-1 well in the Mari lease found gas and condensate in the Lower Goru formation.

== Operated blocks ==
- Mari D&P Lease; MPCL has 100% working interest
- Zarghun South D&P Lease; MPCL has 35% working interest
- Sujawal Block; MPCL has 100% working interest
- Peshawar East; MPCL has 98.2% working interest
- Ziarat Block; MPCL has 60% working interest
- Ghauri Block; MPCL has 35% working interest
- Karak Block; MPCL has 60% working interest
- Sukkur Block; MPCL has 58.8% working interest
- Harnai Block; MPCL has 40% working interest
- Bannu West Block; MPCL has 35% working interest

== Non-operated blocks ==
- Hala Block; MPCL has 35% working interest
- Kohlu Block; MPCL has 30% working interest
- Kalchas Block; MPCL has 20% working interest
- Kohat Block; MPCL has 20% working interest
- Shah Bandar Block; MPCL has 32% working interest

== National Resources Limited ==
National Resources Limited (NRL) is created as joint venture to involve in among other things, exploration, survey, extraction, excavation, mining and sale of produced minerals. Y.B. Pakistan, Arif Habib Equity, Liberty Mills, and Reliance Commodities are the Joint Venture partners. Each will have 20% share.
