= Imtiaz Hussain =

Pakistani army general

Adjutant General of Pakistan Army
- In office 8 March 2007 – October 2008
- Preceded by: Wasim Ahmad Ashraf

Commander of XXXI Corps

Managing Director of Army Welfare Trust

Personal details
- Died: 26 May 2012 Rawalpindi, Punjab, Pakistan
- Education: Command and Staff College, National Defence University, Quaid-i-Azam University

Military service
- Branch/service: Pakistan Army
- Years of service: 1971–2008
- Rank: Lieutenant general
- Unit: Sindh Regiment

Imtiaz Hussain was a Pakistani general who served as the Adjutant General at the General Headquarters from March 2007 until his retirement in October 2008. Earlier, he served as director-general of weapons and equipment and as commander of XXXI Corps at Bahawalpur. After retiring from the army, he became managing director of the Army Welfare Trust and later served on the board of Askari Bank.

== Early life and education ==
Hussain was a graduate of the Command and Staff College, Quetta, and the National Defence University, Islamabad. He also obtained an MSc in War Studies from Quaid-i-Azam University.

== Military career ==
Hussain was commissioned into the Pakistan Army in 1971 and belonged to the Sindh Regiment. In October 2004, he was promoted to the rank of lieutenant general and was serving as director-general of weapons and equipment at General Headquarters at the time. By September 2005, he was serving as corps commander at Bahawalpur, where he presided over a Pakistan Military Academy convocation ceremony.

On 8 March 2007, he was appointed the Adjutant General at General Headquarters, replacing Wasim Ahmad Ashraf, who was posted as corps commander Gujranwala. He also served as director-general doctrine and evaluation and director-general weapons and equipment before his retirement in October 2008.

== Post-retirement career ==
After retiring from the army, Hussain became the managing director of the Army Welfare Trust. He joined the board of Askari Bank on 1 January 2009 and served as a director and chairman of its executive committee.

== Death ==
On 26 May 2012, Hussain died at his residence in the Defence Housing Authority in Rawalpindi after sustaining a gunshot wound to the head. After the incident, the police said he had allegedly shot himself, while his wife said he committed a suicide with his own pistol.
