= Allied Bank Limited =

Commercial bank in Pakistan

- Type: Public
- Traded as: PSX: ABL; KSE 100 component
- Industry: Banking
- Founded: 3 December 1942; 83 years ago Lahore, Pakistan as "Australasia Bank"
- Headquarters: Lahore, Pakistan
- Key people: Mohammad Naeem Mukhtar (chairman); Aizid Razzaq Gill (CEO)
- Products: Financial services
- Revenue: ▼ Rs. 325.78 billion (US$1.2 billion) (2025)
- Operating income: ▼ Rs. 74.20 billion (US$270 million) (2025)
- Net income: ▼ Rs. 35.16 billion (US$130 million) (2025)
- Total assets: ▲ Rs. 3.37 trillion (US$12 billion) (2025)
- Total equity: ▲ Rs. 263.37 billion (US$940 million) (2025)
- Number of employees: 11,988 (2025)
- Parent: Ibrahim Group
- Website: abl.com

Allied Bank Limited (ABL) is a Pakistani commercial bank based in Lahore, Punjab, Pakistan. It is a subsidiary of the Ibrahim Group.

It was founded in 1942 with the name of Australasia Bank. It was renamed to Allied Bank of Pakistan, from Australasia Bank Limited in 1974, and Sarhad Bank Ltd, Lahore Commercial Bank Ltd and Pak Bank Ltd were also merged in it.

== History ==
=== 1942–1974: Early history ===
Allied Bank was established on 3 December 1942, as Australasia Bank at Lahore with an initial capital of Rs 120,000 by Khawaja Bashir Bux, the son of a silk trader. Khawaja Bashir Bux's father, who was originally from Kashmir, had settled in Lahore after being orphaned at a young age. He was trained in silk weaving and later moved to Bombay in the 1880s to work with silk traders. After gaining experience and traveling extensively, he established his own successful silk business in Perth, Australia. Born in 1911, Bashir Bux initially joined his father's silk trade but later decided to venture into the banking industry. The bank experienced significant growth and success following the Partition of India, as many major Indian banks had left Pakistan.

=== 1974–1991: Nationalisation, mergers, and bailouts ===
In 1974, under the nationalisation policy implemented by Prime Minister Zulfikar Ali Bhutto, Australasia Bank was merged with Sarhad Bank, Lahore Commercial Bank, and Pakistan Bank to form one of the five nationalized commercial banks in Pakistan.

Following the nationalization era, Pakistan's banking sector faced major financial challenges. By 1988, the five nationalized banks, including Allied Bank, were costing the government an annual amount equivalent to 8.8 percent of the country's GDP due to frequent bailouts.

=== 1991–2000: Management buyout, corruption, and decline ===
Allied Bank was privatized and purchased by its employees in 1991. During this period, several employee buyouts took place, including that of Exxon Pakistan's fertilizer division. Many believed that Allied Bank's employee buyout would result in the creation of a successful, employee-owned bank. However, this optimism proved to be misplaced. Allied Bank, still operating with practices from its nationalization era, struggled with inefficiency and poor credit practices, unlike the employees of Exxon who were well-versed in private-sector operations. While MCB Bank showed improvement after privatization, Allied Bank continued to face financial difficulties. The bank's non-performing loans increased from 16 percent in 1993 to 36 percent in 2003. The first two CEOs appointed after privatization were imprisoned on charges of corruption, and Allied Bank became the only Pakistani bank to undergo the privatization process twice.

In 1999, a major client of Allied Bank borrowed a substantial amount to acquire a 35 percent stake in the bank. However, the client subsequently defaulted on the loans. The State Bank of Pakistan (SBP), which held a 49 percent share in Allied Bank, intervened and prevented the transfer of shares from employees to external shareholders.

=== 2000–present: Clean-up, second privatization, and growth ===
Following the establishment of the Musharraf administration, Ishrat Hussain was appointed as the governor of the State Bank. He concluded that Allied Bank required a second round of privatization.

In 2000, the government appointed Khalid Sherwani, a former executive of United Bank Limited, to lead a new management team. Sherwani implemented a cost-cutting program that involved closing 194 underperforming branches and reducing the workforce by 2,228 employees over a period of four years. Although initially unpopular, these measures were supported by a thriving economy that provided alternative employment opportunities.

In August 2001, Hussain replaced three board members, including the chairman, to strengthen the bank's leadership. By February 2004, Allied Bank had stabilized sufficiently for the government and SBP to consider privatization once again. However, the bank's balance sheet remained weak, with a non-performing loan ratio of 35.7 percent at the end of 2003.

A new privatization strategy was developed, which involved issuing new shares instead of selling existing ones. This approach ensured that all capital injected by the buyer would go directly into the bank. Six parties submitted bids for Allied Bank, with Askari Bank, NIB Bank, and the Ibrahim Group reaching the final round. The Ibrahim Group, a textile and energy conglomerate, recognized the advantage of directly recapitalizing the bank. After the other bidders withdrew, the Ibrahim Group acquired a 75 percent stake in Allied Bank for Rs14.4 billion ($237 million).

Following the acquisition of Allied Bank by the Ibrahim Group, Khalid Sherwani was reappointed as the CEO. Enthusiastic about continuing his role, Sherwani aimed to build upon his success as a turnaround specialist. With the bank's improved financial strength, he planned to expand the branch network and diversify into other financial services, such as asset management.

Under Sherwani's leadership, the bank's costs as a percentage of revenue consistently decreased, while deposits per branch grew faster than the industry average, closing a significant gap. From 2005 to 2007, net income increased by an average of 14.8 percent per year, reaching Rs4.1 billion ($67.1 million). Additionally, deposits grew by an average of 27.8 percent to Rs263 billion ($4.3 billion) from 2004 to the end of 2007. Three key factors contributed to Sherwani's success: a rising interest rate environment with low deposit costs, the ability to attract new deposits from the Faisalabad business community due to the Ibrahim Group's reputation, and the resolution of non-performing loans before privatization. These factors played a major role in driving Allied Bank's profitability during his tenure.

While Sherwani's effective leadership was evident, his tenure from 2004 to 2007 coincided with a period of widespread financial prosperity. He successfully stabilized the bank before 2004, a feat that had eluded his predecessors since 1974, providing a solid foundation for future growth and making the bank ready for sale.

In October 2007, Sherwani retired as CEO, just before the global and Pakistani financial markets experienced significant turmoil. He left Allied Bank with a commendable record, although it would not be his last tenure as the bank's leader.

Aftab Manzoor succeeded Khalid Sherwani as the CEO of Allied Bank in November 2007, just before the onset of a severe global financial crisis. Despite the challenging circumstances, Manzoor managed to grow the bank's profitability by an average of 29.3 percent per year, reaching Rs7.7 billion ($92.6 million) by mid-2010. Manzoor's success was attributed to his prudent approach to asset expansion, maintaining the non-performing loan ratio below 7.4 percent throughout his tenure and not exceeding 8.2 percent even a year after his departure. The loan book's growth, at an annualized average rate of 14.1 percent, matched the average inflation rate of 14.2 percent per year.

In May 2010, Manzoor decided to leave Allied Bank in May 2010 for undisclosed reasons and Khalid Sherwani was reappointed as the CEO.

In December 2014, the Government of Pakistan sold-off its remaining 11.5 percent stake in ABL for PKR 14.4 billion. The deal was sealed-off at a strike price of Rs. 110 per share for the remaining 131.3 million shares of the government.

In September 2018, ABL opened its Shariah-compliant Aitebar Islamic banking service through its 117 dedicated Islamic banking branches network across 53 major cities of Pakistan. Islamic account holders can also make deposits into and withdrawals from their accounts at Islamic windows in conventional branches.

In 2020 Allied Bank was named in the FinCEN money laundering leak, published by Buzzfeed News and the International Consortium of Investigative Journalists (ICIJ). It had twelve suspicious transactions flagged in the years 2011 and 2012.

== See also ==
- List of largest companies in Pakistan
- List of banks in Pakistan
