= National Fertilizer Corporation =

Pakistani governmental owned chemical company

- Company type: State-owned enterprise
- Industry: Fertilizer
- Founded: August 1973; 52 years ago in Lahore, Pakistan
- Headquarters: Lahore, Pakistan
- Area served: Pakistan
- Owner: Government of Pakistan
- Parent: Ministry of Industries and Production
- Subsidiaries: National Fertilizer Marketing Limited
- Website: nfc.com.pk

The National Fertilizer Corporation (NFC) is a state-owned enterprise headquartered in Lahore. It operates under the administrative oversight of the Ministry of Industries and Production, Government of Pakistan.

== History ==
=== 1973–1986: Early history ===
NFC was incorporated as a private limited company in August 1973 under the nationalization programme of Prime Minister Zulfikar Ali Bhutto, with the aim of consolidating Pakistan's public sector fertilizer assets and expanding domestic production capacity. The corporation took over the fertilizer plants and projects previously held by the Pakistan Industrial Development Corporation (PIDC), together with a privately owned facility that had been nationalized in 1972. The three operating units transferred to NFC at its inception, Pak American Fertilizers at Daudkhel, Lyallpur Chemicals and Fertilizers at Jaranwala, and the Natural Gas Fertilizer Factory at Multan, had a combined annual capacity of about 306,000 tonnes.

In 1974, Syed Babar Ali, who had previously run Packages Limited, was approached by Bhutto to head the new corporation and took charge as founding chairman on 1 February and served for three and a half years. During his tenure, he oversaw an expenditure of around US$500 million on new plant construction, including the launch of the Pak-Arab Fertilizer complex at Multan, the Pak-Saudi Fertilizer plant at Mirpur Mathelo, and the Hazara Fertilizer project at Haripur in the North-West Frontier Province. The Pak-Arab venture was incorporated on 12 November 1973 as a partnership between the Government of Pakistan, acting through PIDC and later NFC, and the Abu Dhabi National Oil Company, holding 52% and 48% of the shares respectively. A separate marketing arm, National Fertilizer Marketing Limited (NFML), was set up as a subsidiary in July 1976 to handle nationwide distribution of the corporation's output through a network of dealers.

=== 1986–2008: Privitisation ===
In 1986, the Government of Pakistan began deregulating the fertilizer sector, removing nitrogenous price controls and gradually opening the industry to private investment. Under the liberalization and privatization programme that followed, NFC's manufacturing units were sold off in stages between 1992 and 2008. Pak-China Fertilizers, a urea plant at Haripur built with Chinese technical and financial assistance, was the first to be divested when it was acquired by the Karachi-based Schon group in May 1992 for around PKR 457 million. Pak-Saudi Fertilizers, originally established as a joint venture with Saudi Arabia and commissioned in October 1980, was sold to Fauji Fertilizer Company in 2002 for PKR 8.151 billion.

Pakarab Fertilizers was acquired in July 2005 by a consortium of the Fatima Group and the Arif Habib Group at a price of around PKR 14 billion. Pak-American Fertilizers, which had been re-equipped in 1999 with a new ammonia and urea complex built using Toyo Engineering of Japan technology, was sold to Azgard 9 in July 2006 for PKR 16.110 billion after the highest bidder, Ibrahim Fibres, declined to complete the transaction; the sale was later flagged in a special audit by the Auditor General of Pakistan for procedural irregularities. Lyallpur Chemicals and Fertilizers, a single super phosphate producer at Jaranwala, was transferred to private ownership in February 2007. The final divestment in the series was Hazara Phosphate Fertilizers at Haripur, a single super phosphate plant completed in 1988–89; following several aborted attempts, 90% of its shares were sold in September 2008 to Pak-American Fertilizers (subsequently renamed Agritech Limited) for around PKR 1.34 billion.

== Former subsidiaries ==
- Pak-China Fertilizers, Haripur Hazara
- Pak-Saudi Fertilizers, Mirpur Mathelo
- Pak-Arab Fertilizers, Multan
- Pak-American Fertilizers, Daudkhel
- Lyallpur Chemicals, Jaranwala
- Hazara Phosphate, Haripur

== Research institutions and universities ==
For research purpose and to train workforce, it established two academic and one research institutes.

Academic institutes are:

- NFC Institute of Engineering and Technology, Multan
- NFC Institute of Engineering and Fertilizer Research, Faisalabad

and one research institute is:

- National Fertilizer Marketing Limited, Lahore
