= Al-Hamra (Islamabad) =

Housing project

Al-Hamra is a housing project launched by Shaheen Foundation in 2005 for the officers of Pakistan Air Force.

Habib Rafiq Pvt. Limited is responsible for master planning and development.

== Project details ==
The master project plan includes the following:

=== Al-Hamra Avenue Housing Scheme ===
Al-Hamra Avenue is a residential housing scheme being developed in Zone-V of Islamabad located on Lehtrar Road leading to PINSTEC and approx. 20 minutes drive from Islamabad Serena Hotel.

- Located at Mouza Ara and Chirah Zone-V, the project covers 1074 kanals of land with 626 residential plots.
- The layout plan was approved by Capital Development Authority on 05-07-2006.
- NOC from CDA has been issued on 15-03-2008.

=== Al-Hamra Hills Country Farm Houses ===
- Located at Mouzas Jhangi Syedan, Kirpa, Ara and Harno Thanda Pani, Lehtrar Road Zone-V, the project covers 1423 kanals of land.
- The layout plan was approved by Capital Development Authority on 10-04-2006.
- NOC from CDA has been issued on 30-07-2010.

A new dual carriageway from Islamabad highway (Khanna Bridge) to Nilore has been planned by CDA, which will provide a quality access to Alhamra Hills. Its main entrance shall be located on Lehtrar Road. The developed scheme shall have 200 farm houses of 2.5 acres land each.

== Project timeline ==
Pakistan Air Force, PAF, Shaheen Foundation was established for the welfare of retired and deceased PAF personnel and their families. It was expected to work on lines of FAUJI Foundation of Pakistan Army. Shaheen Foundation runs several welfare projects and initiatives to its credit including housing projects, schools and colleges. It provides scholarships to deserving and needy students as well as medical assistance

One such scheme, Al-Hamra Housing project was launched in 2006 near Islamabad. Colorful brochures were distributed, a glamorous and impressive site office was established and office staff was hired headed by a retired Pak Army Colonel. This team presented the project in their office on PowerPoint presentations projected on multimedia projectors. Applicants were asked to deposit their dues in installments over three years' time period. They were assured of handing over of their land by end of three years. A grand ceremony was held on site in September 2009. Ballot was held and plot numbers were allotted to the "lucky" winners. No development was observed on site, though.

After six years, in 2015, members were informed in September that the developers of Al-Hamra Housing project had reneged on their agreement. No development work was visible, on site. Capital Development Authority, CDA, is known for several similar land scams. The matter was referred to National Accountability Bureau, NAB. NAB decided to refund original fee plus 50% of the deposited amount to all affected, in eight equal installments. The rate of installment and time period to complete reimbursement was not mentioned.

As predicted, only 28% of the promised amount has been refunded since 2015.

== See also ==
- Capital Development Authority
- Developments in Islamabad
