= NFC Institute of Engineering and Technology =

Coordinates: 30°13′13″N 71°32′18″E

- Type: Public
- Established: 1985
- Affiliations: National Fertilizer Corporation (NFC); Higher Education Commission of Pakistan; Pakistan Council for Architects and Town Planners; Pakistan Engineering Council
- Chancellor: President of Pakistan
- Vice-Chancellor: Lieutenant General (retd) Moazzam Ejaz
- Location: Multan, Punjab, Pakistan
- Nickname: NFCIET
- Website: nfciet.edu.pk

The NFC Institute of Engineering and Technology Multan (NFC-IET) is a public university located in Multan, Punjab, Pakistan.

== History ==
The NFC Institute of Engineering and Technology in Multan was founded in 1985 as a training centre for the chemical process industry with technical assistance from the Japanese firm Cosmo, and was later granted federal degree-awarding status under an act of Parliament in 2012.

The Supreme Court of Pakistan has ruled that the appointment of the Vice Chancellor (VC) of NFC Institute of Engineering and Technology, Multan, since 2018 was unlawful. The court ordered Dr. Akhtar Kalro to return six years' worth of salary and benefits. It also instructed the federal Ministry of Education to close admissions to the institute and immediately appoint an acting VC, Friday, Sept. 20, 2024. A three-member bench, led by Chief Justice of Pakistan Qazi Faez Isa and including Justice Naeem Afghan and Justice Shahid Bilal Hassan, delivered the verdict during a hearing of a petition filed by the All Public Universities BPS Teachers Association (APUBTA). The court found that Dr. Kalro continued to serve as VC without legal authority after his appointment ended in 2018. The bench ordered the return of all salaries and privileges Dr. Kalro received post-2018 and barred him from entering the NFC Institute premises.

The administration of NFC-Institute of Engineering and Technology (NFC-IET) underwent significant changes with the replacement of key officers, including the Registrar (Nasrullah khan Babar) and Department Heads, (Kamran Liaqat Bhatti), (Sadiq Hussain) following revelations of irregularities in their appointments and challengeable Doctorate degree. An investigation confirmed that the appointments were made in contravention of established procedures and regulatory requirements. Consequently, the university's governing body took decisive action to rectify the situation, resulting in the appointments being declared null and void. New appointments were initiated, adhering to proper protocols, to ensure the university's continued commitment to academic excellence and administrative integrity.

== See also ==
- NFC Institute of Engineering and Fertilizer Research, Faisalabad
