= Ayesha Siddiqa =

Pakistani journalist and scholar

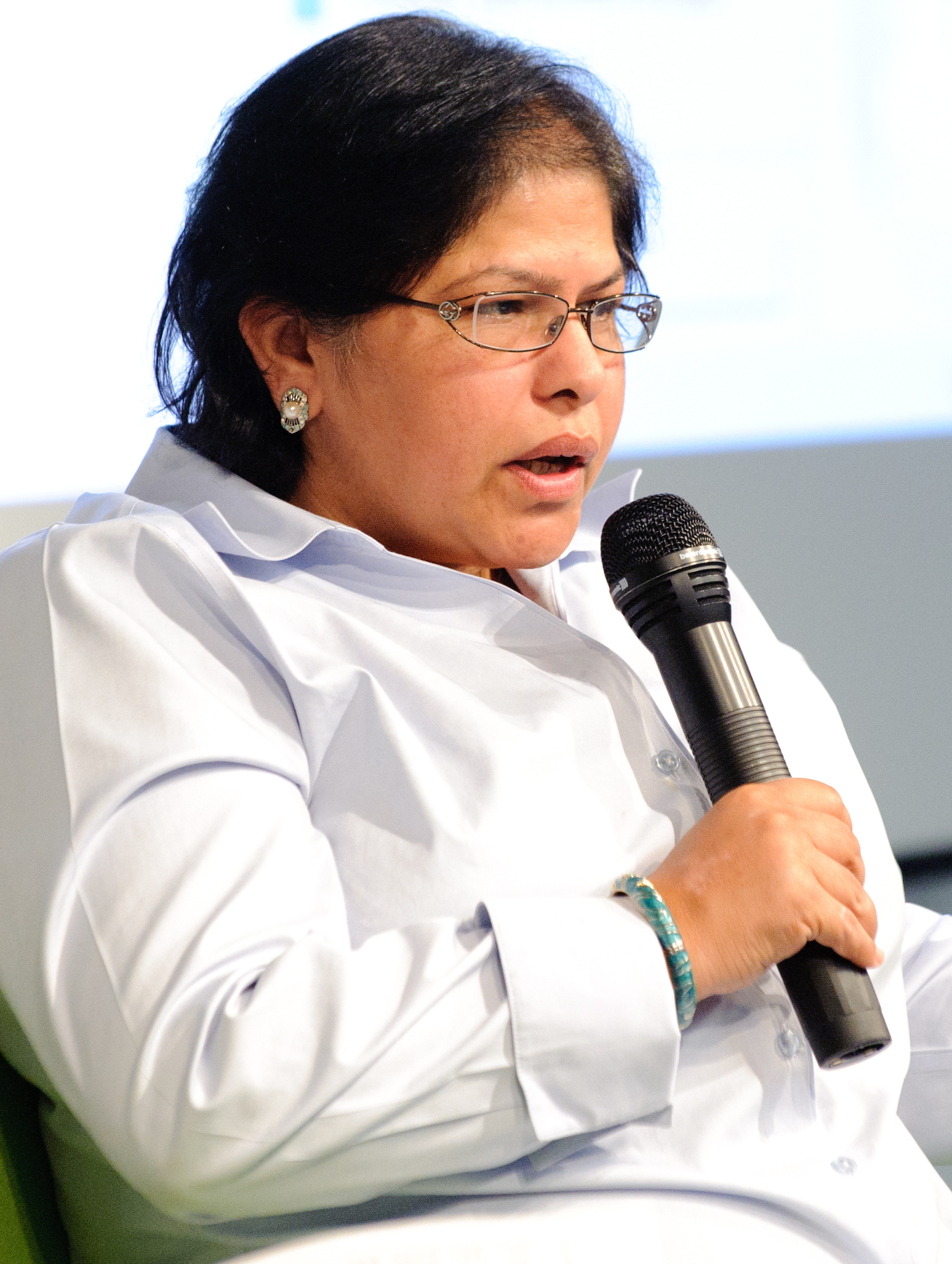
- Born: 7 April 1966 (age 60); Lahore, Punjab, Pakistan
- Education: King's College, London; Kinnaird College for Women University
- Known for: Nuclear deterrent; Pakistan military
- Scientific career
- Fields: Political science
- Workplaces: Pakistan Naval War College; Woodrow Wilson International Center for Scholars; Johns Hopkins University; St Antony's College, Oxford

Ayesha Siddiqa (Urdu: عائِشہ صِدّیقہ; born 7 April 1966) is a Pakistani political scientist, and an author who serves as a research associate at the SOAS South Asia Institute.

She previously served as the inaugural Pakistan Fellow at the Woodrow Wilson Center between 2004 and 2005.

== Biography ==
Born in Lahore, Siddiqa studied at Kinnaird College and went on to join the Civil Service of Pakistan. As a civil servant, Siddiqa served as the director of naval research with the Pakistan Navy, making her the first civilian and the first woman to work at that position in Pakistan's defence establishment. She also worked in military accounts and as deputy director Defence Services Audit. Siddiqa moved to London, where she received her PhD from King's College London in war studies.

After leaving the civil service, she served as the senior research fellow at the Sandia National Laboratories and went on to teach at the University of Pennsylvania, Johns Hopkins University and the Quaid-e-Azam University. She also served as the Charles Wallace Fellow at St Antony's College, Oxford in 2015.

She has written extensively on the Pakistan Armed Forces, and her research has covered issues varying from the Pakistan military's covert development of military technology, defensive game theory, nuclear deterrence, arms procurement and arms production, to civil-military relations in Pakistan.

== Bibliography ==
After leaving the bureaucracy, she authored Pakistan's Arms Procurement and Military Buildup, 1979–99: In Search of a Policy, 2001, and later, in 2007, published her critically acclaimed book: Military Inc.: Inside Pakistan's Military Economy. She also regularly writes critical columns for English language newspapers, including Dawn, Daily Times, The Friday Times and Express Tribune. In October 2026, Siddiqa wrote for Himal Southasian about the growing role of the Inter-Services Public Relations (ISPR) as a public-relations and media organisation for the Pakistan Army, examining its influence on political narratives and its relationship with army chief Asim Munir.
