= Foja =

Foja may refer to:

- Foja Mountains, Indonesia
- Foja Range languages, of New Guinea

== See also ==
- Fauji (disambiguation)
