= Lucky Motor =

Pakistani automobile manufacturer

Lucky Motor Corporation
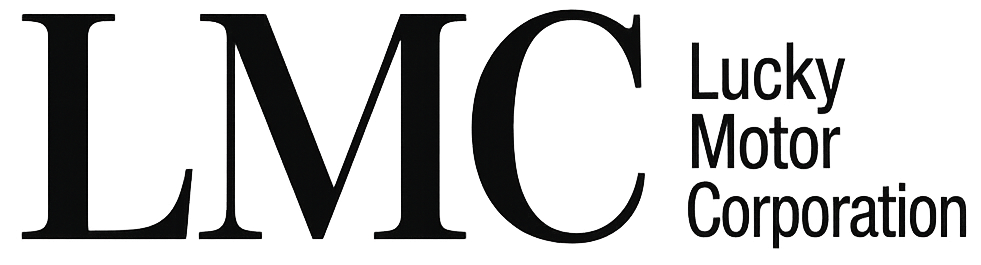

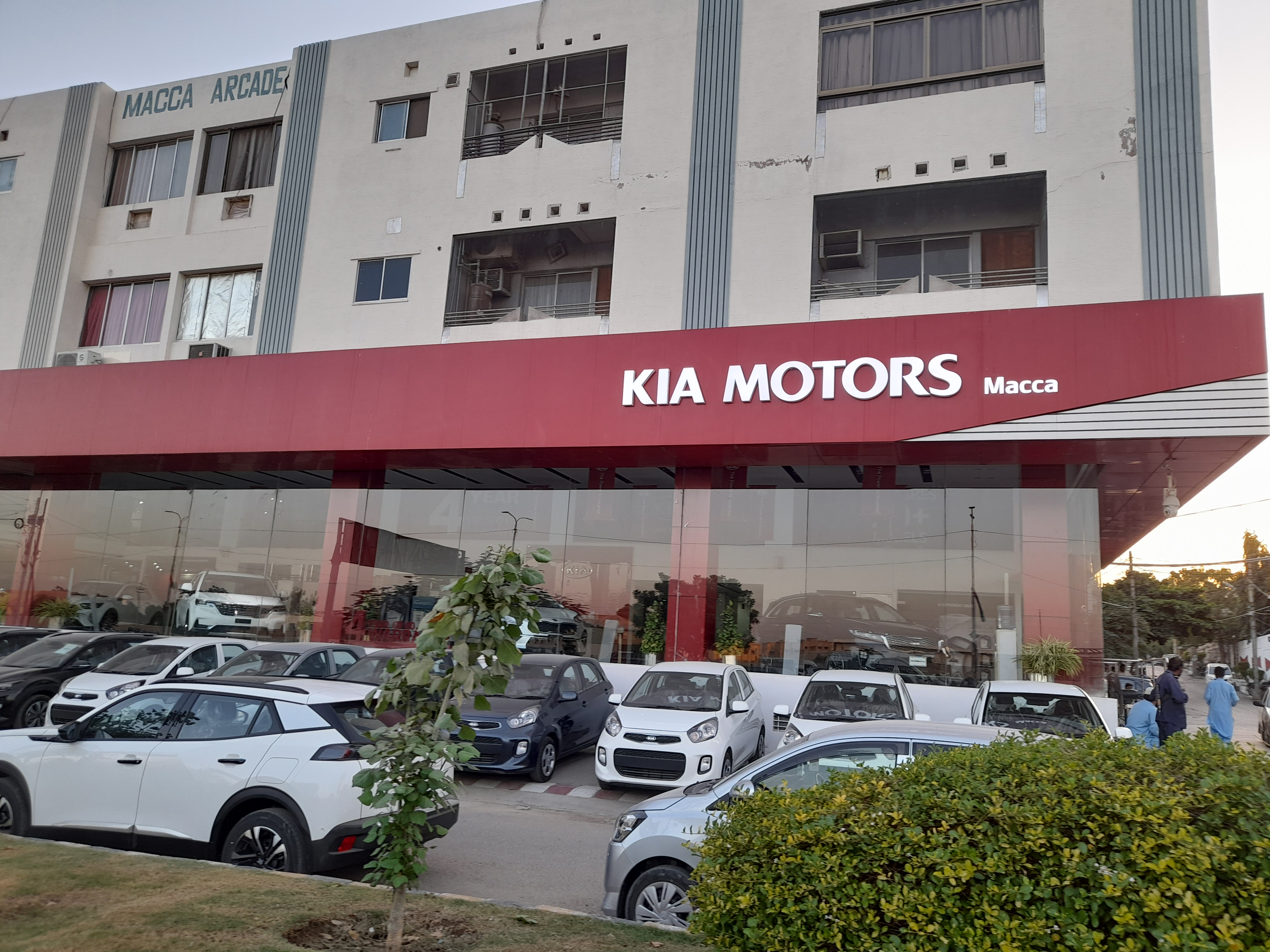
- Type: Subsidiary
- Industry: Automotive
- Founded: 2017; 9 years ago
- Headquarters: Karachi, Pakistan
- Products: Automobiles
- Revenue: ▼ Rs. 82.0 billion (US$290 million) (2023)
- Net income: ▼ Rs. 9.0 billion (US$32 million) (2023)
- Total equity: ▲ Rs. 33.0 billion (US$120 million) (2023)
- Owner: Lucky Cement (71.55%)
- Number of employees: 2000+
- Parent: Lucky Cement
- Website: luckymotorcorp.com
- Footnotes; Financials as of 30 June 2023

Lucky Motor Corporation (LMC) is a Pakistani automobile manufacturer and distributor which is a subsidiary of Lucky Cement.

== History ==
It was founded in 2017 for the purpose of assembling and distributing automobiles from the South Korean automobile manufacturer Kia in Pakistan. Originally incorporated as Kia Lucky Motors Pakistan, the company changed its name to Lucky Motor Corporation Limited in 2020. It did so because it added Peugeot to its business, similarly assembling, distributing, and marketing Peugeot vehicles in Pakistan. Lucky Motor Corporation continues to assemble and market Kia vehicles.

The manufacturing plant became operational in September 2019.

== Mobile assembly ==
Lucky Motor Corporation (LMC) began assembling Samsung smartphones in Pakistan in December 2021, at its plant in Port Qasim Industrial Zone, Karachi. The Pakistan Telecommunication Authority (PTA) issued authorization for its mobile devices in August 2021.

== Products ==
=== Kia ===
- Kia Picanto (City car) (discontinued in 2026)
- Kia Sportage (Compact SUV)
- Kia Stonic (Subcompact Crossover SUV)
- Kia Sorento (Mid-size Crossover SUV)
- Kia Grand Carnival (KA4) (Minivan)

=== Peugeot ===
- Peugeot 2008 (Subcompact Crossover SUV)
