= NFC Institute of Engineering and Fertilizer Research =

Engineering Institute

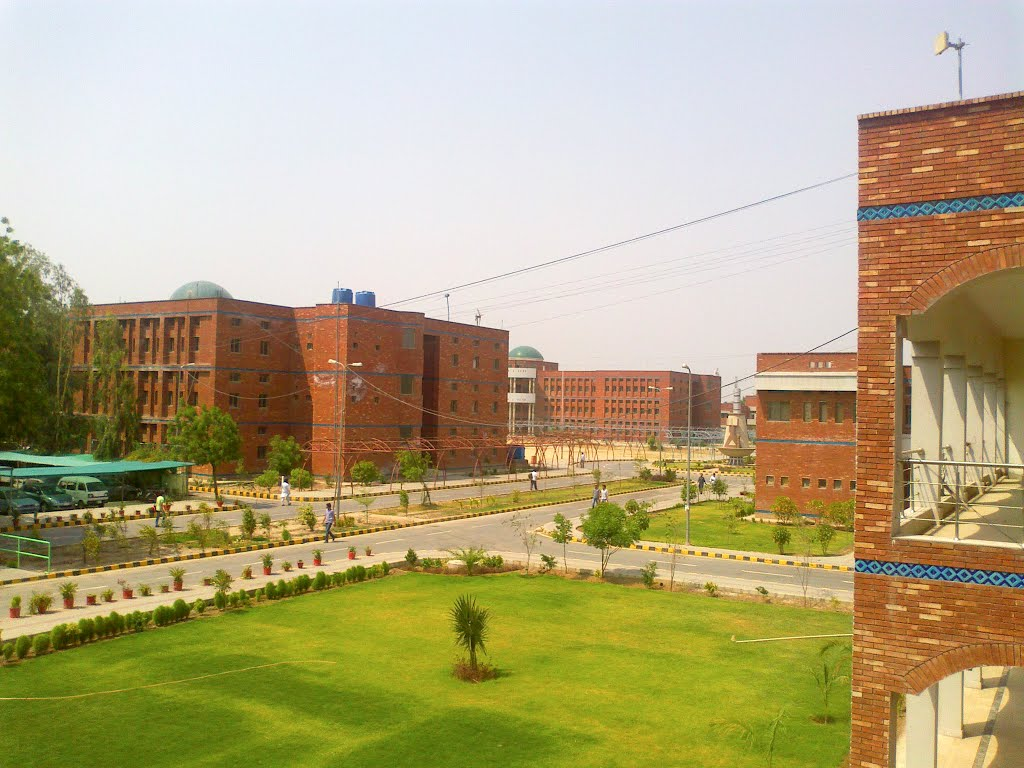
- Motto: Read in the name thy Lord who creates!
- Type: Public University
- Established: 1986
- Affiliations: Pakistan Engineering Council; University of Engineering and Technology, Lahore; National Fertilizer Corporation (NFC)
- Chancellor: President Of Pakistan
- Director: Dr. Najaf Ali Awan (Ph.D)
- Students: 2000+ Students
- Location: Faisalabad, Punjab, Pakistan
- Colours: Blue; Periwinkle
- Nickname: NFC-IEFR
- Website: iefr.edu.pk

The NFC Institute of Engineering and Fertilizer Research (NFC-IEFR) was incorporated in 1986 by National Fertilizer Corporation of Pakistan (NFC) and is located in Faisalabad, Punjab, Pakistan. The first Principal/Director was Dr. Anwar ul Haq from 1986 to 2006. Thereafter Dr.Javaid Rabbani Khan served as Director from 2006 until 2013.

== Recognition ==
- Accredited by Pakistan Engineering Council.
- Affiliated with University of Engineering and Technology, Lahore

== Campus ==
The university is spread over 25 acres. The main building of the institute has administration wing, central library, spectacular air-conditioned auditorium, seminar hall, conference room, IT and linguistic laboratories and research and development department. The academic block is composed of offices for faculty members, classrooms, laboratories and computational lab. For the extension of facilities in the IE&FR campus, a three-story multi purposes block has been constructed, which comprises a large number of multi-disciplined laboratories, classrooms and offices for faculty members.

== Academics ==
=== Degree programs ===
The disciplines and the degree programs offered by the institute have been tabulated below. The regular duration of BS and MS/M Phil degree programs is 4 and 2 years, respectively.

Discipline	Degree Program	
Discipline	BS,	MS / M Phil,
Chemical Engineering	✓	✓
Electrical Engineering	✓	
Mechanical Engineering	✓	
Business Administration	✓	
Civil Engineering	✓	
Computer Sciences	✓	
Information Technology	✓	
Artificial intelligence	✓	
Data Science	✓	
Cyber Security	✓	
Bachelor of Business and Information Technology	✓	

== Societies ==
Following is a list of the officially constituted societies:

- ASHRAE NFC Faisalabad Student Branch
- ASME IE&FR Student Section
- IEFRian Forum
- Hostel Society
- Blood Donors Society
- Debating Society
- IEEE NFC Student Branch - Lahore Section
- Media Club - NFC IEFR (Media)

== See also ==
NFC Institute of Engineering and Technology, Multan
