= Aqeel Karim Dhedhi =

Pakistani businessman

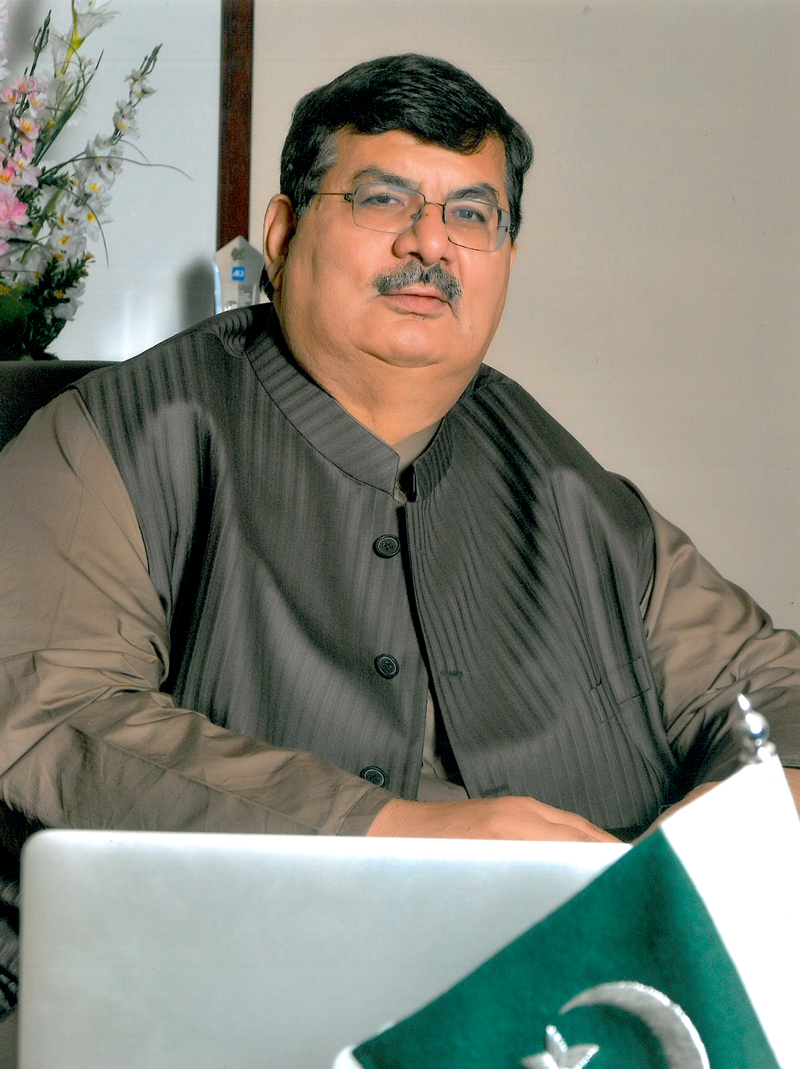

Personal details
- Born: Aqeel Karim Dhedhi; 18 July 1957 (age 69) Karachi
- Children: Hina Dhedhi,Ayesha Dhedhi,Anum Dhedhi,Afsheen Dhedhi
- Occupation: Businessman
- Known for: AKD Group, AKD Securities, AKD Capital

Aqeel Karim Dhedhi (Urdu: عقیل کریم ڈھیڈی; born 18 July 1957) is a prominent Pakistani businessman and stock trader who is the chairman of the AKD Group.

== Early life and career ==
Dhedhi was born into a Kutiyana Memon family who migrated to Pakistan in 1947 from Junagadh. His father, Haji Abdul Karim Dhedhi, founded AKD Group. He completed his schooling at Karachi and began his career by taking part in the export business with his brother. He started cotton business projects when he was in seventh grade. He started trading at Karachi Stock Exchange (KSE) in 1976. In 1984, he built his own office at the Karachi Stock Exchange and became a stocks broker in 1986. He served on the board of the KSE in 1996, 1999 and 2001.

In November 2013, Dhedhi laid down the foundation stone of the new KSE building.

== Awards and recognition ==
Dhedhi was awarded the "Sitara-e-Esaar" by then president Gen. Pervez Musharraf for his services during the devastating October 2005 earthquake that hit the northern areas of Pakistan.

On 23 March 2019, Dhedhi was among the Pakistanis who were awarded the Sitara-i-Imtiaz for their services to the nation.

== Charity work ==
Dhedhi is involved with groups that include community-based assistance, health services, leadership development for the deserving younger generation, and women's empowerment. He is a trustee and member of the board of directors of Shaukat Khanum Cancer Hospital, the Indus Hospital, World Memon Organization, and the Resource Development Committee of Agha Khan University Hospital.

== Air Karachi ==
Air Karachi is a new Pakistani airline seeking a Regular Public Transport (RPT) license from the Civil Aviation Authority (CAA) to begin domestic and international flights. The airline is backed by local investors and registered with the Securities and Exchange Commission of Pakistan (SECP). They plan to offer both passenger and cargo services, with initial plans to operate with three leased aircraft.

Air Karachi is a new venture in Pakistan's aviation sector, with investors announcing an initial seed funding of PKR 5 billion. The airline has applied for an RPT license from the CAA, which is necessary to operate commercial flights. Air Karachi intends to start with domestic flights and expand to international routes in the future. The airline plans to begin operations with a fleet of three leased aircraft. Former Southern Commander (retd) Air Vice Marshal Imran has been appointed as the CEO of Air Karachi. Key shareholders include Aqeel Karim Dhedhi, Arif Habib, SM Tanveer, and others.
