= Army Welfare Trust =

Conglomerate company in Pakistan

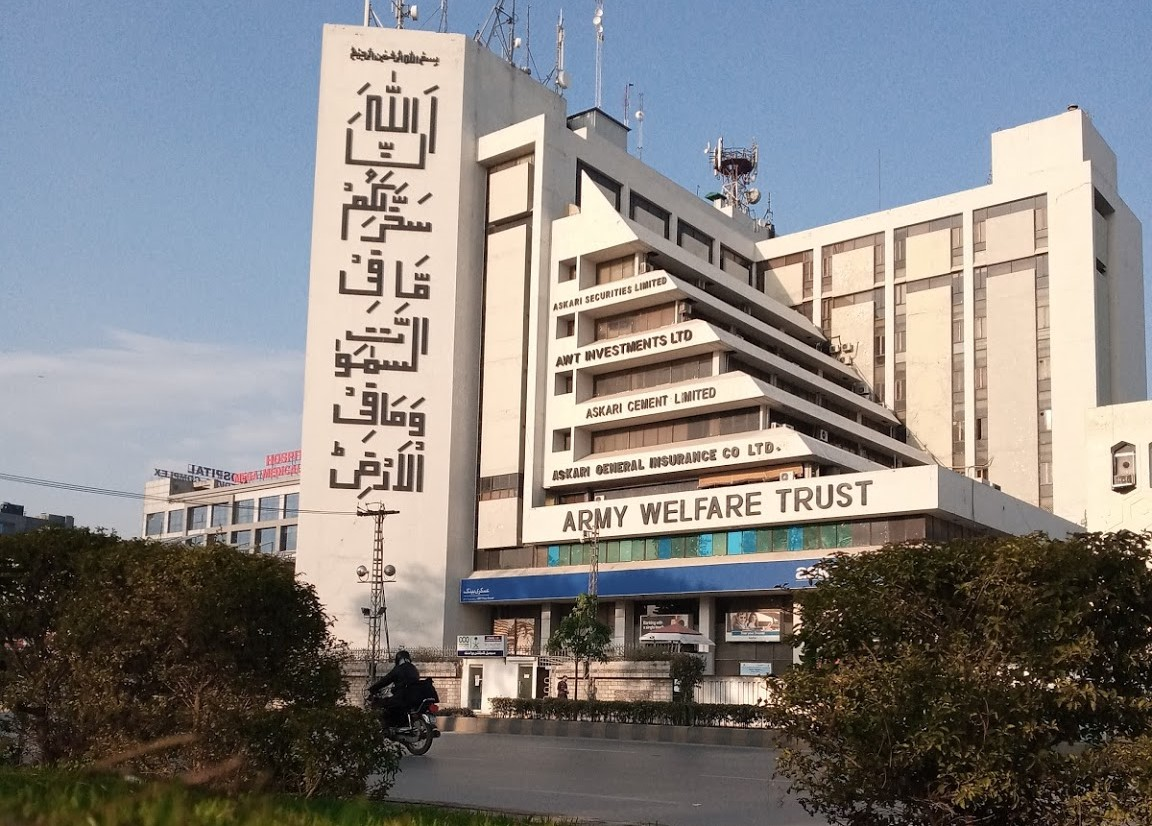
- Headquarters of the Army Welfare Trust in Rawalpindi
- Native name: اعتماد رفاه فوج (AWT)
- Type: Private
- Industry: conglomerate
- Founded: 1971; 55 years ago
- Headquarters: Rawalpindi, Pakistan
- Key people: Lt Gen (R) Nauman Mahmood (Managing Director)
- Net income: 8-9 billions (usd)
- Total assets: ▲ Rs. 40 billion (US$140 million) (2020)
- Number of employees: ~30,000 (2020)
- Subsidiaries: Mobil Pakistan
- Website: awt.com.pk

Army Welfare Trust (AWT), also known as Askari Group, is a Pakistani conglomerate based in Rawalpindi.

The Army Welfare Trust, along with Fauji Foundation, are run by ex-military personnel of the Pakistan Army. The companies provide employment opportunities to ex-military personnel and generate funds for the welfare and rehabilitation of orphans, widows of deceased soldiers, and disabled personnel of the army.

== History ==
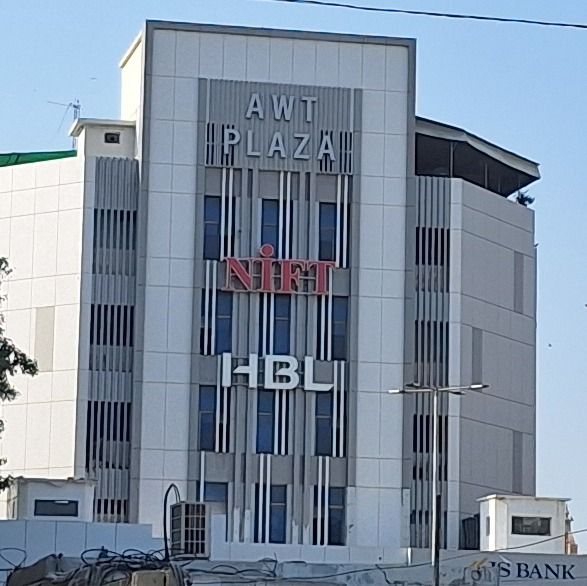
AWT Plaza on I.I. Chundrigar Road in Karachi

Army Welfare Trust (AWT) was established in 1971 as a society under the Societies Registration Act of 1860, with an initial endowment of Rs 0.7 million. It became fully operational in 1977. The first commercial unit of the trust was a stud farm located in Probyanabad which it received from Pakistan Army in 1972.

In 1984, AWT Sugar Mills was established in Badin with an initial crushing capacity of 2000 tonnes per day (TPD) which was later increased to 3400 TPD. In the same year, stud farm in Boyle Gunj came under the control of AWT.

In 1988, AWT Rice Mills was established in Rakh Baikunth with the capacity to process 5,500 tonnes of paddy and 3,000 tonnes of rice.

In 1990, AWT founded Askari Shoes with a factory in Lahore. In the same year, Army Welfare Mess and Blue Lagoon Restaurant was launched in Rawalpindi.

In 1991, AWT launched housing schemes in Lahore, Badaber, and Sangjani near Islamabad.

In 1995, AWT entered insurance and aviation business and established Askari General Insurance and Askari Aviation Services.

In 1996, AWT acquired 80 percent shareholding of the Wah Cement Company under the government's privatisation policy. In the same year, AWT established Mobil Askari Lubricants in a joint venture with Mobil Oil Corporation, with a 30 percent equity share. The lubricant blending and distribution plant was constructed in Karachi and it began commercial production in 1997. Askari Guards was also established in 1996.

In 2002, AWT established a business in fuel sector called Askari CNG. It was renamed as Askari Fuels in May 2014.

In 2004, AWT founded Askari Seeds which now has three factories located in Lahore, Okara, and Sukkur.

In 2013, AWT sold its pharmaceuticals business located in Phool Nagar, Askari Pharmaceuticals, which was later renamed as Citi Pharma.

In 2014, AWT acquired Fauji Security Services from Fauji Foundation. In the same year, Askari Apparel was established in Lahore.

In 2015, AWT inaugurated Askari Blue Lagoon in Faisalabad.

In 2017, AWT founded an asset management company named AWT Investment Company in a joint venture with Pak Brunei Investment Company.

== Management ==
Army Welfare Trust is administered from the General Headquarters (GHQ) of Pakistan Army, where the service chief serves as the head of the governing board, supported by senior staff officers.

== Subsidiaries ==
It is one of the largest conglomerates in Pakistan. The assets the group owns are:

=== Listed on Stock exchange ===
- Askari General Insurance Company Limited
- Askari Life Assurance Company Limited

=== Unlisted ===
Following are the companies which are not listed on Pakistani stock exchanges:

- Askari Aviation
- Askari Airline (Planned)
- Askari Airport Services
- Askari Flying Academy
- Askari Travels & Tours
- Mobil Pakistan (MAL Pakistan Limited)
- AWT Investments Limited
- MEDASK
- Askari Project, Lahore
- Askari Enterprises
- Askari Welfare Rice Mill
- Army Welfare Sugar Mills
- Askari Welfare Pharmaceutical Project in Phool Nagar
- Army Welfare Hosiery Unit
- Askari Fish Farm
- Askari Guards
- Fauji Securities Services Pvt Ltd (acquired from Fauji Foundation)
- Askari Woolen Mills
- Askari Development and Holdings (Pvt) Ltd
- Askari Shoes
- Jolidays
- Askari CNG
- Askari Fuels
- Askari Enterprises Pvt Ltd
- Askari Farms and Seeds
- Askari Real Estate
- Askari Corporate Tower, Lahore
- Army Welfare Commercial Project
- Askari Welfare Saving Scheme
- Askari Associate Limited
- Askari Information Service
- Askari Power Limited
- Askari Commercial Enterprises
- Askari Travel Agencies
- Askari Aviation
- AWT Commercial Plazas
- Askari Housing Schemes
- Blue Lagoon Rawalpindi
- Blue Lagoon, Faisalabad
- Askari Apparel, Lahore
- Army Welfare Mess and Blue Lagoon Restaurant, Rawalpindi
- Magnesite Refineries Limited
- Two stud farms in Pakpattan and Okara

=== Former ===
- Askari Bank
- Askari Cement
- Askari Leasing Limited, merged with Askari Bank

== See also ==
- Fauji Foundation
- Bahria Foundation
- Shaheen Foundation
- Defence Housing Authority
