= Fauji Cement =

Pakistani cement manufacturer

- Type: Public
- Traded as: PSX: FCCL; KSE 100 component KSE 30 component
- Industry: Cement
- Founded: 1992
- Headquarters: Rawalpindi, Pakistan
- Area served: Pakistan
- Key people: Qamar Haris Manzoor (CEO)
- Products: Cement
- Production output: 11,000 tons/day
- Revenue: ▲ Rs. 68.069 billion (US$240 million) (2023)
- Operating income: ▲ Rs. 16.017 billion (US$57 million) (2023)
- Net income: ▲ Rs. 7.439 billion (US$27 million) (2023)
- Total equity: ▲ Rs. 65.176 billion (US$230 million) (2023)
- Parent: Fauji Foundation
- Website: fccl.com.pk
- Footnotes; Financials as of 30 June 2023

Fauji Cement Company Limited (Urdu pronunciation: [ˈfaʊ.dʒi sɪˈmɛnt] FOW-jee-si-MENT) is a Pakistani cement manufacturer headquartered in Rawalpindi. It is the third largest cement manufacturer in Pakistan and is a subsidiary of the Fauji Foundation.

== History ==
Fauji Cement Company Limited was founded as a publicly traded corporation and initiated operations in 1996. It started with a daily production capacity of 3700 tons, which has since expanded to 11000 tons per day.

In 2022, FCCL commissioned on two expansion projects, propelling the company to become the second-largest cement producer in the North region and the third-largest in Pakistan. The company broadened its operations at the Nizampur site in Khyber Pakhtunkhwa and the DG Khan site in Punjab. The Nizampur expansion, which added 2.05 million tons, was operational in the 4th quarter of 2022. The total cost of the project was Rs27 billion, with Rs17 billion financed through debt and Rs10 billion through equity. The DG Khan expansion, also adding 2.05 million tons, was anticipated to be operational in the 3rd quarter of 2024.

On October 27, 2022, FCCL effectively brought into operation the 3rd line of cement production, boasting a daily clinker production capacity of 6,500 tons, at its existing Nizampur site in Nowshera, Khyber Pakhtunkhwa.

In November 2021, Fauji Cement Company Limited (FCCL) underwent a merger with Askari Cement, a subsidiary of the Army Welfare Trust. The FCCL Board of Directors gave their approval for the integration of Askari Cement Ltd. into its operations through a scheme of arrangement. The consolidation occurred based on a share swap ratio of 5:1, implying that for every 1 share held in Askari Cement Limited, 5 shares of Fauji Cement Company Limited were issued.

== Court Cases and Controversies of Fauji Cement Company Limited ==
=== Legal Disputes and Merger Approval ===
Fauji Cement has been involved in legal proceedings concerning its corporate operations. Notably, the merger between Fauji Cement Company Limited and Askari Cement Limited was sanctioned by the Lahore High Court under Sections 279 to 282 of the Companies Act, 2017. This approval followed a detailed process involving public notices, creditor consultations, and hearings. The merger was finalized based on a share swap ratio of 5:1, with Fauji Cement issuing five shares for every one share held in Askari Cement.

=== Structural Collapse Incident ===
In May 2016, a controversy arose when the raw meal silo structure at one of Fauji Cement's plants collapsed, causing extensive damage to production line-2 and the coal mill area. This incident led to an estimated loss ranging from Rs2 billion to Rs20 billion. Analysts projected that the plant would remain non-operational for five to six months, potentially extending to a year. Insurance claims were insufficient to cover the replacement costs, which were estimated at approximately $80 per ton for damaged parts.

=== Royalty Dispute in Punjab ===
In August 2024, Punjab-based cement manufacturers, including Fauji Cement, obtained a court stay against a 6% royalty imposed on ex-factory cement and clinker prices for limestone and argillaceous clay. The stay order required manufacturers to furnish bank guarantees while accounting for the royalty cost as a non-cash expense in financial statements. This led to increased cement prices by up to Rs75 per bag in anticipation of unfavorable legal outcomes.

=== Financial Challenges Post-Merger ===
Following its merger with Askari Cement, Fauji Cement faced financial challenges due to higher borrowings and increased finance costs. The company's effective tax rate rose significantly due to a one-time super-tax. Despite improved market share and revenues post-merger, demand for cement declined due to high construction costs and reduced public sector spending.

=== Fauji Products Boycott ===
In 2023-2025, Pakistan witnessed a controversy involving calls for boycotting Fauji Foundation products after the arrest of former Prime Minister Imran Khan. This highlighted the complex relationship between military-affiliated businesses and political tensions in the country. Former Prime Minister Imran Khan's arrest took place inside the Islamabad High Court, leading to widespread protests and unrest across the country. The Supreme Court of Pakistan later declared the arrest illegal and ordered Khan's immediate release4.

Following Khan's arrest and subsequent political tensions, supporters of his party, Pakistan Tehreek-e-Insaf (PTI), initiated social media campaigns advocating for a boycott of products from military-operated businesses.
