= Fauzi =

Fauzi is an Indonesian surname. Notable people with the surname include:

- Absor Fauzi (born 1987), Indonesian footballer
- Azka Fauzi (born 1996), Indonesian footballer
- Gamawan Fauzi (born 1957), Indonesian politician
- Helmy Fauzi (born 1964), Indonesian politician
- Rishadi Fauzi (born 1990), Indonesian footballer
