= Colgate-Palmolive Pakistan =

Pakistani subsidiary of Colgate-Palmolive

- Formerly: National Detergents Limited (1977–1990)
- Type: Public
- Traded as: PSX: COLG; KSE 100 component
- Industry: Consumer goods
- Founded: 1977; 49 years ago
- Headquarters: Karachi, Pakistan
- Key people: Zulfiqar Ali Lakhani (CEO); Iqbal Ali Lakhani (chairman)
- Products: Colgate, Palmolive, Brite, Bonus, Softlan, Express, and Lemon Max
- Revenue: ▲ Rs. 91.459 billion (US$330 million) (2023)
- Operating income: ▲ Rs. 16.684 billion (US$60 million) (2023)
- Net income: ▲ Rs. 10.336 billion (US$37 million) (2023)
- Total assets: ▲ Rs. 47.446 billion (US$170 million) (2023)
- Total equity: ▲ Rs. 24.316 billion (US$87 million) (2023)
- Owner: Colgate-Palmolive (30%); SIZA Services (25%); SIZA Limited (17.4%); Premier Fashions (12.20%); Iqbal Ali Lakhani (4.5%); SIZA Commodities (3.4%)
- Number of employees: 1,217 (2023)
- Parent: Colgate-Palmolive; Lakson Group
- Website: colgate.com.pk
- Footnotes; Financials as of 30 June 2023

Colgate-Palmolive Pakistan, formerly known as National Detergents Limited is a Pakistani consumer goods company based in Karachi, Pakistan. It is a subsidiary of American multinational company Colgate-Palmolive.

It was founded in 1977 and operates in oral care, personal care, and fabric care sectors.

== History ==
Colgate-Palmolive Pakistan was founded in 1977 as National Detergents Limited by Lakhani family. It set up a plant at Kotri in Sindh to make detergent powder, using machinery from the Italian firm Ballestra that was financed with a foreign currency loan. In 1981, it began commercial production at its Kotri plant, and in December 1981, it launched Brite Machine Wash detergent. In 1984, it offered 100,000 ordinary shares at their Rs 10 par value, 80,000 for the public and 20,000 for the National Investment Trust, and was listed on the stock exchange.

In 1985, National Detergents received licence to produce Colgate-Palmolive products in Pakistan. In 1988, it launched Colgate toothpaste in 1988, with its toothpaste plant reaching full production in July, and set up a personal products division making toilet soap and toothpaste. In 1990, National Detergents was renamed as Colgate-Palmolive Pakistan when Colgate-Palmolive became its shareholder.

In 2019, the Competition Commission of Pakistan imposed Rs. 10 million on the company for running deceptive marketing campaign.

== Factories ==
- Lahore
- Kotri

== Brands ==
- Colgate
- Colgate Toothbrush
- Palmolive
- Brite
- Bonus
- Softlan
- Express
- Lemon Max
