= Fatima Fertilizer Company =

Pakistani fertiliser manufacturer

Fatima Fertilizer Company Limited
- Type: Public
- Traded as: PSX: FATIMA
- ISIN: PK0091601010
- Industry: Fertilizer
- Founded: 2003; 23 years ago
- Headquarters: Lahore, Pakistan
- Area served: Pakistan
- Key people: Arif Habib (Chairman); Fawad Ahmed Mukhtar (CEO)
- Revenue: ▲ Rs. 266 billion (US$950 million) (2024)
- Net income: ▲ Rs. 36 billion (US$130 million) (2024)
- Total assets: ▲Rs. 317 billion (US$1.1 billion) (2024)
- Number of employees: 2,597 (December 2020)
- Website: fatima-group.com/fertilizer/fatima-fertilizer/

Fatima Fertilizer Company Limited is a Pakistani fertiliser manufacturer headquartered in Lahore, Pakistan. It was established in 2003 as a joint venture between the Fatima Group and the Arif Habib Corporation.

The company manufactures, sells, imports, and exports fertilisers and chemicals. Its production includes two intermediary products, ammonia and nitric acid, and three final products: urea, calcium ammonium nitrate, and nitro phosphate. Pakistan's fertilizer sector is oligopolistic, with nine companies in operation. Fatima Fertilizer is the third-largest player with a market share of about 6.1%. A major factor in its profitability is an exclusive gas supply contract from the Mari Gas Field, operated by Mari Petroleum.

== Operations ==
Fatima Fertilizer runs three plants in Sadiqabad, Multan, and Sheikhupura; the latter was acquired in 2015 from Dawood Hercules Corporation. It also holds an equity stake in Midwest Fertilizer Company in Indiana, United States, through a Singapore-based subsidiary.

== Expansion ==
The company plans to build a new urea plant at Port Qasim with an investment exceeding US$500 million, which will add one million tons to its annual capacity. Fatima Group has also partnered with Algeria's Sonarem to develop phosphate reserves at Bir el Ater, and jointly with Lucky Cement has acquired a 66.66% stake in National Resources (Pvt) Limited, a Balochistan-based mineral exploration company.
