= Imran Ahmad (admiral) =

Vice admiral in the Pakistan Navy

Vice Admiral Imran Ahmad HI(M) SI(M) TI(M)
- Born: Imran Ahmad
- Education: National Defence University
- Military career
- Allegiance: Pakistan
- Branch/Service: Pakistan Navy
- Service years: 1985–2022(Retd)
- Rank: , Vice Admiral
- Unit: Naval Engineering Branch
- Awards: Hilal-e-Imtiaz (Military); Sitara-e-Imtiaz (Military); Tamgha-e-Imtiaz (Military)

Imran Ahmad HI(M) SI(M) TI(M) is a retired vice admiral of the Pakistan Navy who served as Deputy Chief of the Naval Staff (Projects), DCNS-P at Naval Headquarters in Islamabad. He took the office as Head of Projects branch of Pakistan Navy. His previous assignments includes Assistant Chief of Naval Staff (Maintenance), managing director of Pakistan Navy Dockyard, in addition to serving as Commandant Pakistan Navy Engineering College and PNS Jauhar.

== Career ==
He graduated from the National Defence University. He was commissioned in the Pakistan Navy with his first assignment at Marines Engineering branch in 1985. He was also a part of the acquisition mission of the Oliver Hazard Perry-class frigate at the United States.

== Awards and decorations ==

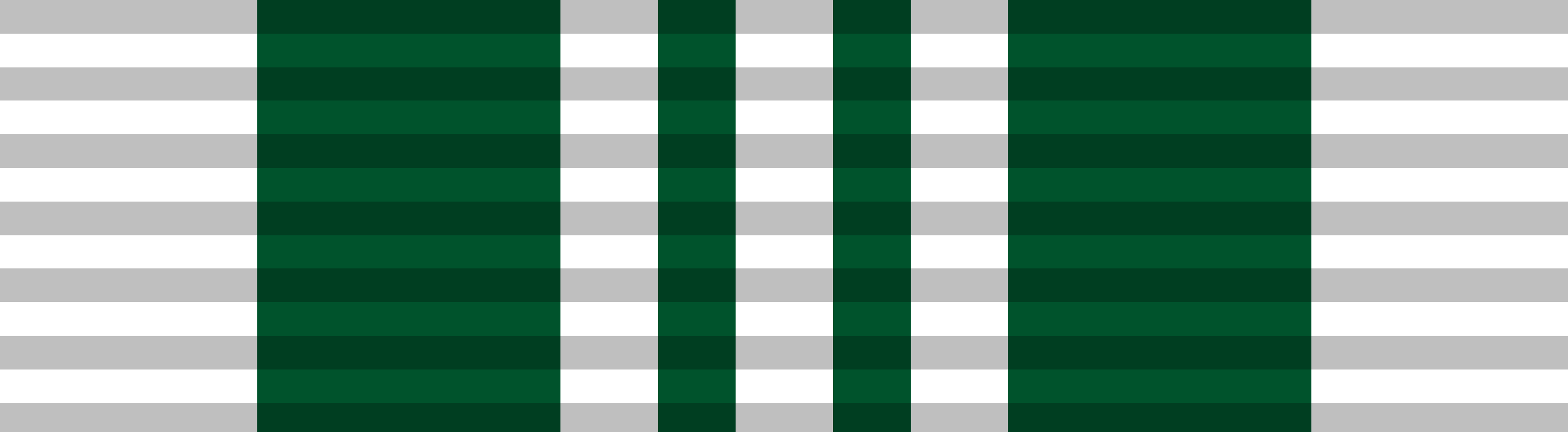

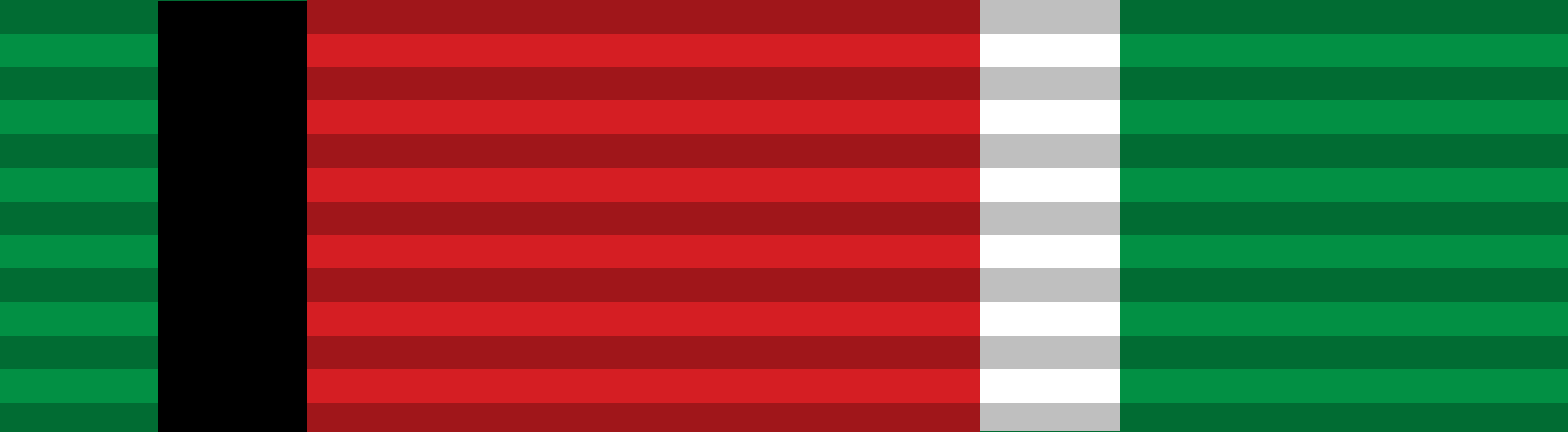

	Hilal-e-Imtiaz (Military) (Crescent of Excellence)		
Sitara-e-Imtiaz (Military) (Star of Excellence)	Tamgha-e-Imtiaz (Military) (Medal of Excellence)	Tamgha-e-Baqa (Nuclear Test Medal) 1998	Tamgha-e-Istaqlal Pakistan (Escalation with India Medal) 2002
Tamgha-e-Azm (Medal of Conviction) (2018)	10 Years Service Medal	20 Years Service Medal	30 Years Service Medal
35 Years Service Medal	Jamhuriat Tamgha (Democracy Medal) 1988	Qarardad-e-Pakistan Tamgha (Resolution Day Golden Jubilee Medal) 1990	Tamgha-e-Salgirah Pakistan (Independence Day Golden Jubilee Medal) 1997
