= Arif Habib =

Pakistani businessman

- عارف حبیب
- Born: 1952 (age 73–74); Karachi, Pakistan
- Occupations: Founder and chief executive of Arif Habib Group

Muhammad Arif Habib (Urdu pronunciation: [ˈaː.rɪf ha.ˈbiːb] AA-rif hah-BEEB; b. 1953) is a Pakistani stock trader who founded the Arif Habib Group. He also serves as member of Boards of Governors of Karachi School of Business and Leadership (KSBL).

== Early life ==
Habib was born to a Memon family in Karachi. His family were from Jamnagar, Gujarat, where they owned a tea venture and several properties. Following the independence of Pakistan in 1947, they left behind their businesses and migrated to Pakistan. His formal education ended after completing 10th grade (Matric) and never attended university. In 1970, he began his career in the brokerage industry at the Karachi Stock Exchange, which his brother had purchased.

== Career ==
In 1970, at the young age of 17, Habib began his career as a stockbroker at the Karachi Stock Exchange (KSE), hired by his elder brother who bought a trading license. His monthly salary was 60 rupees. He spent his days in the trading hall analysing shares and statements for investors, which he credits as having contributed to his knowledge of stocks. In 1992, Habib was voted president of the KSE and he computerised the stock trading system. He was elected president of the KSE five more times.

In 1998, Habib acquired stocks following market crash after nuclear tests by India and Pakistan. Anticipating a market recovery, Habib made substantial investments during this period, which proved profitable as the market saw a significant rebound in the following years.

In 2000, he founded Pakistan's second asset management company which currently manages over $430 million (Rs. 49 billion).

With Pakistan's state-owned companies undergoing a process of privatisation at that time, Habib bought stakes in fertiliser, cement and steel production, as well as banking.

In 2008, regulatory curbs on stock trading due to the 2008 financial crisis resulted in Habib's stock clients defaulting, as the KSE 100 Index fell by 48% within two months. However, his business recovered following a rise in corporate earnings.

In addition to his role at KSE, Habib was a founding member of the Central Depository Company. He has also served as a member of the Privatisation Commission, Board of Investment, and the Securities and Exchange Ordinance Review Committee. The government of Pakistan has appointed him into the board of governors for several companies.

In December 2025, it was announced that a consortium led by Habib had acquired a 75% shareholding in Pakistan International Airlines through a government auction. The acquisition, valued at 135 billion Rs ($482 million), represented one of Pakistan’s largest privatisation transactions in the aviation sector.

== Air Karachi ==
Air Karachi is a new Pakistani airline seeking a Regular Public Transport (RPT) license from the Civil Aviation Authority (CAA) to begin domestic and international flights. The airline is backed by local investors and registered with the Securities and Exchange Commission of Pakistan (SECP). They plan to offer both passenger and cargo services, with initial plans to operate with three leased aircraft.

Air Karachi is a new venture in Pakistan's aviation sector, with investors announcing an initial seed funding of PKR 5 billion. The airline has applied for an RPT license from the CAA, which is necessary to operate commercial flights. Air Karachi intends to start with domestic flights and expand to international routes in the future. The airline plans to begin operations with a fleet of three leased aircraft. Former Southern Commander (retd) Air Vice Marshal Imran has been appointed as the CEO of Air Karachi. Key shareholders include Aqeel Karim Dhedhi, Arif Habib, SM Tanveer, and others.

== Privatization of Pakistan International Airlines (PIA) ==
In December 2025, a consortium led by Arif Habib Corporation Limited acquired an initial 75% majority stake and management control of Pakistan International Airlines Corporation Limited (PIACL) for Rs135 billion, marking Pakistan's first major privatization in nearly two decades Broadcast live on national television, the open auction saw the consortium outbid Lucky Cement.
