= Fauji Foods =

Pakistani food company

- Formerly: Noon Pakistan Limited (1966–2016)
- Type: Public
- Traded as: PSX: FFL
- Industry: Food processing Dairy
- Founded: 1966; 60 years ago
- Headquarters: Lahore, Pakistan
- Area served: Pakistan
- Key people: Haseeb Aslam (CEO)
- Products: Milk, butter, cheese, ghee, tea whitener, juices, breakfast cereals
- Brands: Nurpur; Dostea
- Revenue: ▲ Rs. 19.809 billion (US$71 million) (2023)
- Operating income: ▲ Rs. 936.507 million (US$3.3 million) (2023)
- Net income: ▲ Rs. 605.111 million (US$2.2 million) (2023)
- Total equity: ▲ Rs. 14.055 billion (US$50 million) (2023)
- Owner: Fauji Fertilizer Company (66.29%); FFBL Power Company (15.87%)
- Parent: Fauji Fertilizer Company
- Subsidiaries: Fauji Infraavest Foods; Fauji Cereals
- Website: faujifoods.com
- Footnotes; Financials as of 30 June 2023

Fauji Foods Limited (Urdu pronunciation: [ˈfaʊ.dʒi fuːdz] FOW-jee-FOODS) is a Pakistani food company based in Lahore. It is part of Fauji Foundation.

Fauji Foods is known for its dairy products and brands such as Nurpur, and Dostea. It is listed on the Pakistan Stock Exchange.

== History ==
Fauji Foods was established in 1966 by Noon family who had been in business at Bhalwal, in Sargodha District, since 1911, running a ginning factory there, and opened Noon Sugar Mills in 1964.

In 1970, Noon Pakistan was listed on the Karachi Stock Exchange. In 1972, it began commercial operations, and by 1973 its plant at Bhalwal was producing butter, cheese and milk powder. Its dairy products were sold across Pakistan under the Nurpur brand.

In 2015, Fauji Fertilizer Bin Qasim acquired Noon Pakistan. Before acquisition, the company shares were held by Pakistani politician Malik Adnan Hayat Noon and Salman Hayat Noon with 48.9 percent and 25.5 percent respectively, and it was in loss for two consecutive years. Later, Fauji Fertilizer Bin Qasim gave a loan of Rs. 3.5 billion to Fauji Foods.

In 2018, Chinese company Yili Group expressed its intent to buy 51 percent stake in Fauji Foods. Later, in 2019, it withdrew its interest.

In February 2024, Fauji Foods acquired Fauji Infraavest Foods Limited and Fauji Cereals from Fauji Foundation.

== Subsidiaries ==
=== Fauji Cereals ===
Fauji Cereals was established in 1954 and began production in 1956 in a joint venture with Quaker Oats. Quaker Oats designed the facility of Fauji Cereals and supplied machinery from Scotland. Quaker Oats exited from Pakistan in 1962.

Initially, Fauji Cereals produced ready-to-eat (RTE) breakfast cereals, including corn, wheat, and rice flakes. The company later expanded its product range to include cereal varieties, ready-to-cook porridges, desserts such as mixes, custards, and jellies, and more recently, flour and grain products. Its products include Bran Flakes, Choco Cups, Choco Rings, Choco Stars, and Frosted Flakes.
