= Aisha Steel =

Pakistani steel company

Aisha Steel Mills Limited
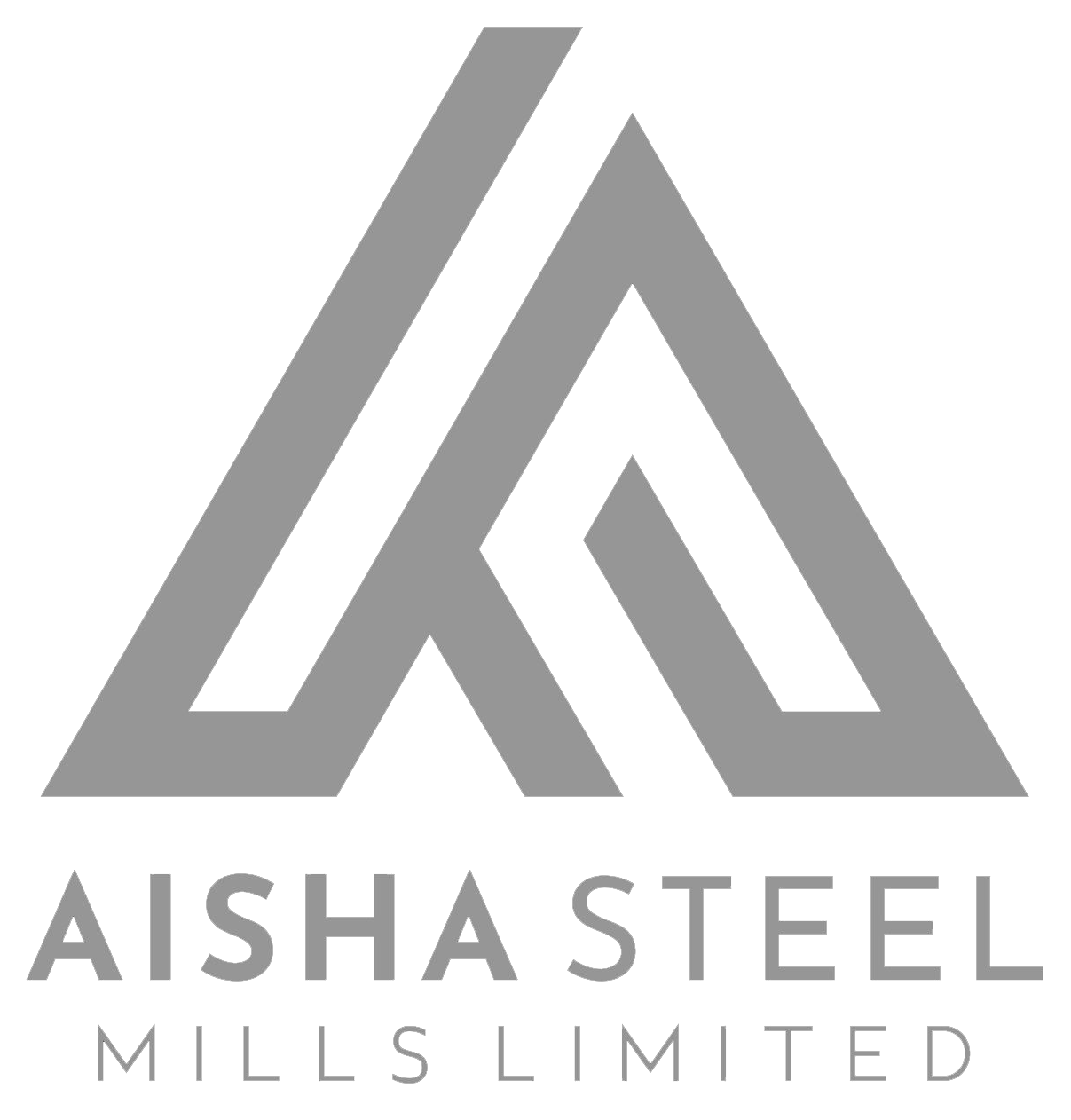
- Type: Public
- Traded as: PSX: ASL
- Industry: Steel
- Founded: 2005; 21 years ago
- Headquarters: Karachi, Pakistan
- Area served: Pakistan
- Key people: Munir Ahmed (CEO)
- Products: Cold rolled steel coils and sheets
- Number of employees: 753
- Parent: Arif Habib Group
- Website: aishasteel.com

Aisha Steel Mills Limited (ASML) (Urdu: عائشہ اسٹیل) is a Karachi-based steel manufacturing company with production capacity of 220,000 metric tons per year. It is owned by Arif Habib Group.

Its plant is located at Bin Qasim, Karachi and produces at a capacity of 220,000 metric tons per year.

== History ==
Aisha Steel Mills was founded in 2005 as a joint venture between Arif Habib Group, Metal One Corporation, a subsidiary of Mitsubishi and Universal Metal One, one of the world's largest steel trading companies.

In 2012, it had an initial public offering (IPO) and was oversubscribed by 2.7 times. In the same year, the company started commercial operations.

In 2017, under China-Pakistan Economic Corridor (CPEC) agreement between the governments of China and Pakistan, Aisha Steel Mills like other major steel producers in Pakistan, is preparing to meet the expected increase in steel supply demands related to the upcoming infrastructure projects in Pakistan.
