= AKD Group =

Pakistani corporate group

- Type: Corporate group
- Traded as: PSX: AKDHL; PSX: AKDSL
- Founded: 1947; 79 years ago
- Founder: Abdul Kareem Dedhi
- Headquarters: Karachi, Pakistan
- Key people: Aqeel Karim Dhedhi (CEO)

AKD Group is a group of companies based in Karachi. It was founded in 1947 by Abdul Karim Dhedhi. The current chairman of the AKD Group is Mr. Aqeel Kareem Dhedhi.

== History ==
AKD Group was founded in 1947 by Abdul Karim Dhedhi, father of the current Chairman Mr. Aqeel Kareem Dhedhi It began business in 1973 as a brokerage house before expanding into investment banking and mutual funds. In 2007, the group explored investing in four coal-fired power plants, but their initial offer was declined due to the fact that, though financial capacity was present, they lacked the technical ability to assure success. In 2011, AKD Group was committed to the development of the Gwadar port and naval base, but was permitted to pull out of the arrangement alongside their partners, the Port of Singapore Authority and the National Logistics Cell because 584 acres at the mouth of the port necessary for the development were not surrendered as expected by the Pakistan Navy.

In 2013, Reuters described it as "one of Pakistan's largest domestic conglomerates" and The Independent described it as one of Pakistan's largest corporations. In the same year, AKD Group came under scrutiny under allegations of insider trading when it, along with other traders, invested in the Sui Southern Gas Co. owned by the Pakistan government just before the gas company's prices went up. In 2017, three of the company's top officials were arrested during a raid of the company for investigation into possible fraud related to the Employees Old-Age Benefit Institution. In August 2018, AKD was cleared for lack of evidence, with a federal report titled "False implication of AKD Securities in EOBI scandal." During the investigation, the three officials remained jailed for months.

In 2015, AKD was among the first in Pakistan to create a real estate investment trust (REIT) management unit in response to easing of governmental regulations on investor ratios to create a trust to support the ongoing construction of the Arkadians. Arkadians is a 43-acre high-rise residential property that the ADK Group had been developing on behalf of the Defense Housing Authority at least since 2012. In March 2018, The National Assembly of Pakistan Standing Committee on Housing and Works praised the leadership of Dhedhi and the supervision of the AKD Group's CEO Ayesha Dhedhi in the quality construction of government accommodations to National Assembly members in the project.

In 2018, Dawn described it as a "capital market giant," while that same year the UK's Daily Express described it as "leading Pakistani securities firm." The group operates in real estate, brokerage and financial services, infrastructure, natural resources and telecom sectors, including with its brokerage arm, investment house AKD Securities, which in 2002 launched the first online brokerage firm in Pakistan, AKD Trade. AKD Group's chairman is Aqeel Karim Dhedhi.

== AKD-led consortium buys majority stake ==
Two firms, Dawood Jan Muhammad and AKD Holding, have collectively acquired approximately 56% of the shares in Pakistan Services Limited (PSL), the company that owns and manages the Pearl Continental Hotels chain.

This acquisition, which took place on July 14, 2025, involved both firms purchasing shares at Rs700 per share. Dawood Jan Muhammad acquired 28% (worth over Rs6.37 billion), and AKD Holding acquired 27.9% (worth over Rs6.3 billion), bringing the total combined value of these purchases to over Rs12 billion.

This significant 56% stake is considered sufficient to take over the management of PSL's board, leading to speculation about a potential change in control. The acquisition followed the postponement of a PSL board meeting on June 30, and the company's share price had seen a notable increase between July 11 and July 20.

== Listed companies ==
- AKD Hospitality Limited
- AKD Securities Limited
