= Bahria Foundation =

Pakistani conglomerates company

- Bahria Foundation, Pakistan Navy
- بحریہ فاؤنڈیشن
- Abbreviation: BF
- Formation: 1982; 44 years ago
- Founder: Pakistan Navy
- Type: Charitable trust
- Legal status: Welfare foundation
- Purpose: Welfare of serving and retired Pakistan Navy personnel and their families
- Headquarters: Karachi, Sindh, Pakistan
- Coordinates: 24.8441°N 67.0027°E
- Region served: Pakistan
- Managing Director: Imran Ahmad
- Parent organization: Pakistan Navy
- Subsidiaries: Bahria Classification Society; Bahria Dredging Company Ltd. Bahria Travels; Bahria Paints; Bahria Maritime Works; Bahria Filling Station
- Website: bahriafoundation.com

Bahria Foundation (Urdu pronunciation: [bɛɦˈriː.ja] beh-REE-yah) is a Pakistani conglomerate based in Karachi. The business is run by the Pakistan Navy and was established for welfare of its employees in 1982.

It is currently headed by Vice Admiral (R) Imran Ahmad HI(M).

== History ==
Bahria Foundation was founded in 1981 under the Charitable Endowments Act of 1889 by Pakistan Navy with an initial investment of Rs 3 million.

== Subsidiaries ==
It owns following assets:

- Bahria Bakery
- Bahria Catering and Decoration
- Bahria Construction
- Bahria Classification Society
- Bahria Coastal Services
- Bahria Deep Sea Fishing
- Bahria Diving and Salvage International
- Bahria Dredging Company Limited
- Bahria Transshipment Hub of Pakistan Limited
- Bahria Enterprise Systems and Technologies
- Bahria Harbor Services
- Maritime Technical & Support Services
- Bahria Maritime Services Pvt Ltd
- Maritime Works Organization
- Bahria Recruiting Agency
- Bahria Security Systems & Services
- Bahria Travels
- Bahria Paints
- Bahria Pharmacy
- Bahria Education And Training System
- Bahria Maritime Works Organization
- Al-Falah Trading Agency
- Bahria Filling Station
- Bahria Shipping
- Bahria Ship Breaking

=== Proposed ===
- Sino Pak Refinery (Planned)
- Bahria Foundation LNG Terminal Project (Planned)

== Education ==
- Bahria University
- Bahria Schools and Colleges

== Legal issues ==
=== Bahria Town brand name controversy ===
In a significant legal dispute, business tycoon Malik Riaz was ordered by a Rawalpindi district court to pay Rs388.13 million as compensation to the Bahria Foundation for unauthorized use of the 'Bahria' brand name for his housing society. The dispute began in 1996 when Hussain Global, representing Riaz, partnered with the Bahria Foundation to establish Asia's largest private housing society, Bahria Town. Despite an agreement to cease using naval nomenclature for his housing society, a case was filed against Riaz in 2002. Despite the setback, Riaz's legal adviser has stated they will appeal the verdict.

== See also ==
- Shaheen Foundation
- Fauji Foundation
