= Fauji Fertilizer Company =

Fertilizer company of Pakistan

- Native name: شرکت کھاد فوجی
- Type: Public
- Traded as: PSX: FFC; KSE 100 component KSE 30 component
- Industry: Chemicals
- Founded: 1978; 48 years ago
- Headquarters: Rawalpindi-46000, Pakistan
- Number of locations: Rawalpindi, Sadiqabad, Mirpur Mathelo, Karachi, Lahore
- Key people: Anwar Ali Hyder (Chairman); Jahangir Piracha (CEO)
- Products: Fertilizer, Urea
- Production output: 7000+ MT/day
- Revenue: ▲ Rs. 371.96 billion (US$1.3 billion) (2024)
- Operating income: ▲ Rs. 111.759 billion (US$400 million) (2024)
- Net income: ▲ Rs. 85.525 billion (US$310 million) (2024)
- Total assets: ▼ Rs. 416.952 billion (US$1.5 billion) (2024)
- Total equity: ▲ Rs. 131.88 billion (US$470 million) (2024)
- Owner: Fauji Foundation (43%)
- Number of employees: ~3,500 (2025)
- Parent: Fauji Foundation
- Website: ffc.com.pk
- Footnotes; Financials as of 31 December 2024

Fauji Fertilizer Company Limited (FFC) (Urdu pronunciation: [ˈfaʊ.dʒi ˈfɝː.tɪ.laɪ.zər] FOW-jee-FER-ti-LY-zer) is a Pakistani fertilizer manufacturer with its Head Office based in Rawalpindi. It is a subsidiary of the Fauji Foundation.

FFC produces various fertilizers which include urea, DAP, SOP, MOP, Boron (Di-Sodium Tetra Borate Decahydrate) and Zinc (Zinc Sulfate Monohydrate).

== History ==
Fauji Fertilizer Company Limited (FFC) was incorporated in 1978 as a joint venture between Fauji Foundation and Haldor Topsoe of Denmark. The first urea complex was commissioned in 1982 in Sadiqabad, Punjab. In 1991, it was listed on the Karachi Stock Exchange and Lahore Stock Exchange. A year later, it was also listed on the Islamabad Stock Exchange. A second plant was built at the same location in 1993.

In 2002, FFC acquired Pak Saudi Fertilizers Limited urea plant from the National Fertilizer Corporation, for PKR 8.151 billion (PKR 135.85 per share) under a privatisation process of the Government of Pakistan.

In 2012, FFC commissioned a wind farm project with a capacity of 49.50 MWh.

In 2013, FFC acquired 43.15 percent equity stake of Askari Bank (AKBL) with a total investment of PKR 10.46 billion. In October 2013, FFC also acquired Al-Hamd Foods Limited and later renamed it as Fauji Fresh 'n' Freeze Limited.

In 2018, FFC entered into a joint venture with Hubco by investing US$39 Million in Thar Energy Limited (TEL) for an equity share of 30 percent.

== Plants ==
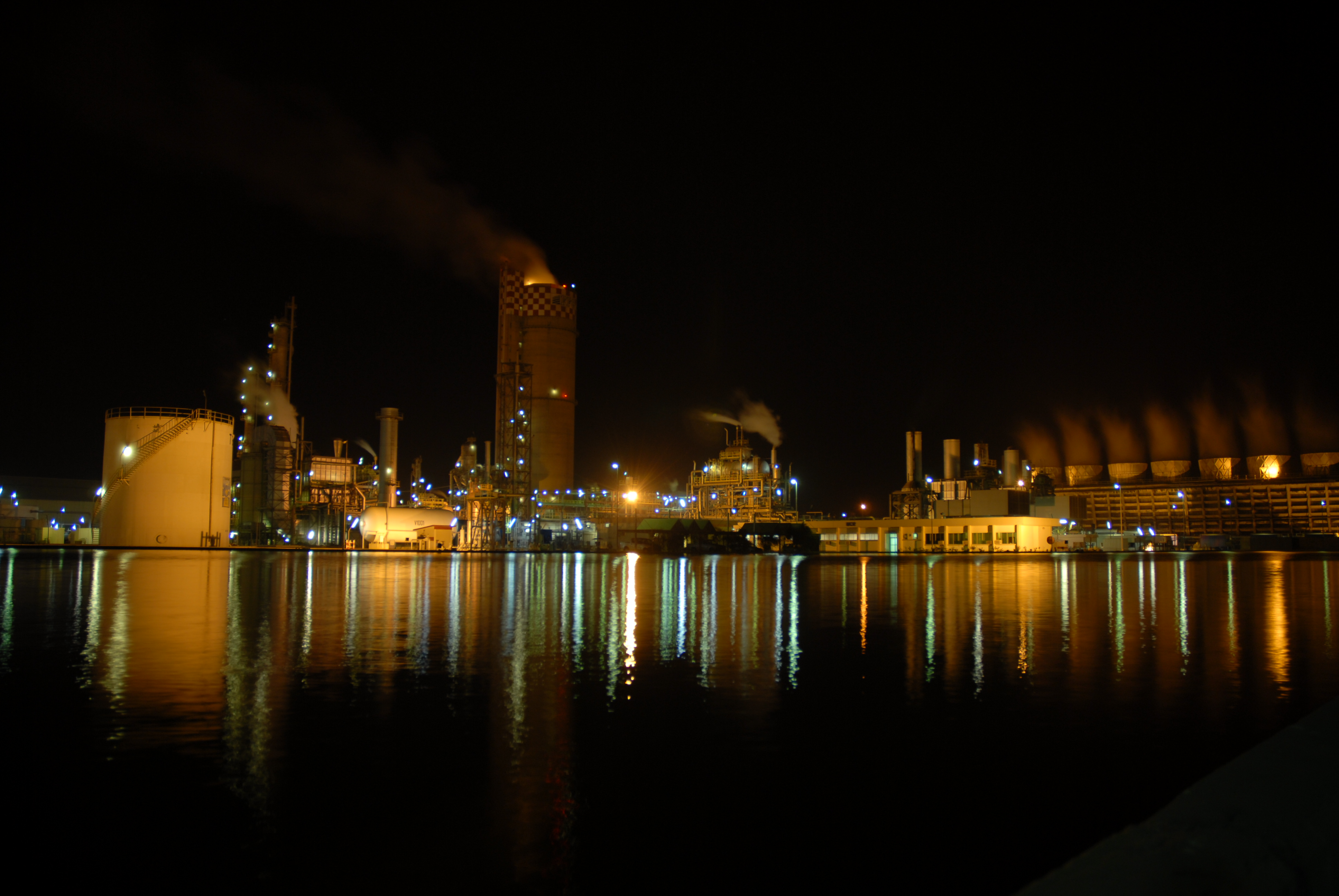
FFC Plant at Night

=== FFC-I ===
Fauji Fertilizer established its first urea plant, FFC I, in Sadiqabad in 1979. The plant had a production capacity of 570,000 tons per annum (TPA) and an initial construction cost of US$303 million. The plant was supplied by Haldor Topsoe and was commissioned in 1982 after an additional investment of US$15 million.

As of 2024, FFC-I has a capacity to produce 403,000 TPA of ammonia and 695,000 TPA of urea.

=== FFC-II ===
FFC II was commissioned in March 1993 with a capacity of 635,000 TPA at a total cost of US$328 million. FFC II plant was supplied by Snamprogetti.

As of 2024, FFC-II has a capacity to produce 363,000 TPA of ammonia and 635,000 TPA of urea.

=== FFC-III ===
FFC-III is a urea plant located near Mirpur Mathelo on the Punjab-Sindh border in northern Sindh, Pakistan. The plant was established as a joint venture between the governments of Pakistan and Saudi Arabia. It operated under the National Fertilizer Corporation (NFC) as a fully owned subsidiary and was known as Pak-Saudi Fertilizer until 2002. The plant was commissioned in October 1980 at a cost of PKR 2.08 billion. In 2002, Fauji Fertilizer acquired Pak Saudi Fertilizer urea plant from the National Fertilizer Corporation, for PKR 8.151 billion under a privatisation process of the Government of Pakistan. It has an annual urea production capacity of 557,000 tons.

FFC-III plant sources its natural gas from the nearby Mari gas field, operated by Mari Petroleum, which is jointly owned by the Government of Pakistan and the Fauji Foundation.

As of 2024, FFC-III has a capacity to produce 413,000 TPA of ammonia and 718,000 TPA of urea.

=== FFC-IV ===
Fauji Fertilizer Bin Qasim was originally established in 1993 as Fauji Jordan Fertilizer Company (FJFC), a joint venture among Fauji Foundation, Fauji Fertilizer, and Jordan Phosphate Mines. The venture was set up to produce granulated urea and diammonium phosphate (DAP) in Pakistan, aiming for daily outputs of 1,670 metric tons and 1,350 metric tons, respectively. In 2002, the government of Pakistan paid Rs. 5 billion to Fauji Jordan Fertilizer for non-implementation of the provisions of Fertilizer Policy 1989. In 2003, following the divestiture of Jordan Phosphate Mines, the company was renamed Fauji Fertilizer Bin Qasim Limited.

Fauji Fertilizer Bin Qasim LIMITED had an annual capacity of 551,000 metric tons of urea and 445,500 metric tons of DAP which was later revamped to 670,000 metric tons of DAP. Sui Southern Gas Company supplies gas to FFC Bin Qasim at the market rate.

== Gallery ==
FFC Township Mosque

Plantsite Admin Building
