= Anwar Ali Hyder =

Pakistani military officer and politician

Caretaker Federal Minister for Defense and Defense Production
- In office 17 August 2023 – 4 March 2024
- Prime Minister: Anwaar ul Haq Kakar
- Preceded by: Khawaja Asif
- Succeeded by: Khawaja Asif

Chairman Naya Pakistan Housing & Development Authority
- In office June 2019 – November 2022

Personal details
- Education: Command and Staff College, Quetta; National Defence University Islamabad; US Army War College, Pennsylvania
- Profession: Military Officer, Politician
- Awards: Hilal-i-Imtiaz (Military) 2014

Military service
- Allegiance: Pakistan
- Branch/service: Pakistan Army
- Years of service: 1984–2019
- Rank: Lieutenant General

Anwar Ali Haider is a Pakistani retired military officer who is currently serving as the managing director of Fauji Foundation. He served in various positions in Pakistan Army including Adjutant General in General Headquarters, President National Defense University and Director General Staff Duties in Chief of Army Staff Secretariat. After retirement, he served as Federal Minister for Minister for Defense and Defense Production in the Kakar caretaker government.

== Early life and education ==
Anwar Ali Haider was commissioned in the Frontier Force Regiment in March 1984. He is a graduate of Command and Staff College Quetta, National Defense University Islamabad and US Army War College, Pennsylvania. He did MSc War Studies from National Defense University Islamabad and MSc Strategic Studies from US Army War College, Pennsylvania.

== Career ==
=== Military ===
During his military career, Hyder served as Adjutant General at General Headquarters, president of the National Defense University, and Director General Staff Duties at Chief of Army Staff Secretariat. He also commanded two infantry battalions, an infantry brigade and an infantry division. He also served as Chief of Staff, Corps, and Grade 1 Staff Officer in the Chief of General Staff Secretariat and Military Operations Directorate.

=== Post-retirement ===
After his retirement from Pakistan Army in 2019, he served as Chairman NAPHDA from June 2019 to November 2022. He served as the Federal Minister for Defense and Defense Production in the caretaker government of Kakar.

== Awards ==
He was awarded the COAS Commendation Card in 1990 and the Hilal-i-Imtiaz (Military) in March 2014 for his distinguished service in the Pakistan Army.
