= Arif Habib Corporation =

Corporation in Pakistan

Arif Habib Corporation Limited
- Native name: شرکت عارف حبیب محدود
- Type: Public
- Traded as: PSX: AHCL
- Industry: Holding
- Founded: 1970; 56 years ago
- Founder: Arif Habib
- Headquarters: Karachi-74000, Pakistan
- Key people: Asadullah Khawaja (chairman); Arif Habib (CEO)
- Net income: ▲ Rs. 7.820 billion (US$28 million) (2024)
- Total equity: ▲ Rs. 43.049 billion (US$150 million) (2024)
- Number of employees: 23 (2024)
- Subsidiaries: Sachal Energy Development Limited (85.83%); Arif Habib Limited (72.92%); Rayaan Commodities (72.92%); Pakistan International Airlines (100%)
- Website: arifhabib.com.pk
- Footnotes; Financials as of 30 June 2024

Arif Habib Corporation Limited, also known as the Arif Habib Group, (Urdu pronunciation: [ˈaː.rɪf ha.ˈbiːb] AA-rif hah-BEEB) is a Pakistani business conglomerate headquartered in Karachi, Pakistan. The corporation was founded by Pakistani businessman Arif Habib.

== History ==
Arif Habib Group started its operations as a pure capital markets firm in 1970 and was engaged in brokerage business since its inception. In 1994, it incorporated itself as the Arif Habib Securities.

In 2006, Arif Habib acquired Rupali Bank and renamed it as Arif Habib Bank.

In 2007, Arif Habib was considered a fairly large financial services conglomerate in Pakistan. It owned one large asset management company, a big investment bank, a securities brokerage firm and a retail bank. During the 2008 worldwide financial crisis, it was at brink of collapse.

In 2009, Arif Habib sold the bank to Suroor Investments for Rs. 2.7 billion (US$32.5 million) which then merged with Atlas Bank and Mybank to form Summit Bank.

In 2010, Arif Habib merged its investment arm, Arif Habib Investments, with MCB Asset Management to form the MCB-Arif Habib Savings and Investments Limited.

== Subsidiaries ==
- Sachal Energy Development Limited (85.83%)
- Pakistan International Airlines (100%)
- Arif Habib Limited (72.92%)
- Rayaan Commodities (72.92%)
- Safe Mix Concrete (32.40%)
- Javedan Corporation (19.84%)
- Aisha Steel Mills (13.8%)
- Fatima Fertilizer Company (15.19%)
- Power Cement (6.50%)

=== Former ===
- MCB-Arif Habib Savings and Investments
- Pakarab Fertilizers
- Silk Bank

== See also ==
- Fatima Group
