= Lucky Cement =

Pakistani conglomerate based in Karachi

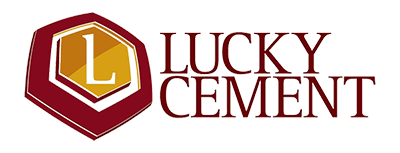
- Type: Public
- Traded as: PSX: LUCK; KSE 100 component KSE 30 component
- Founded: 1993
- Founder: Abdul Razzak Tabba
- Headquarters: Karachi, Pakistan
- Number of locations: Pezu, Lakki Marwat District, Nooriabad, Jamshoro
- Key people: Muhammad Ali Tabba (CEO); Muhammad Sohail Tabba (chairman)
- Products: Ordinary Portland Cement; Sulphate Resistant; Cement Clinker; Block Cement
- Revenue: ▲ Rs. 449.63 billion (US$1.6 billion) (2025)
- Operating income: ▼ Rs. 100.08 billion (US$360 million) (2025)
- Net income: ▲ Rs. 76.96 billion (US$280 million) (2025)
- Total assets: ▲ Rs. 729.36 billion (US$2.6 billion) (2025)
- Total equity: ▲ Rs. 388.04 billion (US$1.4 billion) (2025)
- Owner: Yunus Brothers Group
- Number of employees: 7,092 (2024)
- Subsidiaries: Lucky Core Industries (55%); Lucky Electric Power (100%); Lucky Motor Corporation (71.55%); Lucky Rawji (50%); Najmat Al Samawa (50%); Yunus Energy Limited (20%)
- Website: lucky-cement.com
- Footnotes; Financials as of 30 June 2025

Lucky Cement Limited, also known as Lucky Group, is a Pakistani conglomerate headquartered in Karachi, Sindh. Named after the place, Lakki Marwat, where the first plant was commissioned in 1993, Lucky has become one of the largest cement producers in Pakistan. It has 15.3 million tonnes per annum of manufacturing capacity. The company is listed on the Pakistan Stock Exchange.

== History ==
Lucky Cement Limited was founded in 1993 by Abdul Razzak Tabba. It established a cement manufacturing plant in Pezu located in Lakki Marwat District of the Khyber Pakhtunkhwa Province. Along with 2 other plans located in Karachi.

In 1994, Lucky Cement was listed on the Karachi Stock Exchange following an initial public offering.

Over the years, Lucky Cement has expanded its business operations with a plant in Nooriabad, Jamshoro District, Sindh and two field plants at Karachi on Super Highway. It exports its loose cement using its own loading and storage terminal at Karachi Port, which has a capacity of 24,000 tons of cement.

In June 2024, the global depository receipts of Lucky Cement were delisted from the London Stock Exchange.

== Shareholding ==
Lucky Cement is owned by a corporate group called Yunus Brothers Group and its subsidiaries including Gadoon Textile Mills, Lucky Textile Mills, and Yunus Textile Mills, all based in Karachi. It is one of four companies that collectively control 19.3% of the total market capitalization on the Pakistan Stock Exchange (PSX).

== Products ==
In 2017, the company was producing Ordinary Portland Cement, Sulphate Resistant Cement, Block Cement and Clinker and had about an 18 percent share of the Pakistani cement market.

== Power generation ==
The company is producing enough electricity to not only fulfil its own requirements but has also started supplying electricity to Hyderabad Electric Supply Company (HESCO). and is now in the process of providing electricity to Peshawar Electric Power Company.

Geared to sustainable growth, The YB Group has diversified into the power generation sector by investing into Lucky Electric Power Company Limited. The company is a wholly owned subsidiary of Lucky Cement. It is the largest importer of coal with Lucky Cement Limited investing in a 660MW coal-based power project in Bin Qasim Town.

In July 2020, K-Electric Limited (Karachi) and Lucky Cement signed an agreement whereby K-Electric would buy up to 6 megawatt (MW) of electricity from Lucky Cement to be supplied to DHA City, Karachi being developed along Superhighway.

== Alternate fuel ==
Lucky Cement has shifted its focus to alternate fuel such as TDF and RDF.

== Sustainability reporting ==
In 2012, Lucky Cement was the only company in Pakistan to receive an A+ rating by Global Reporting Initiative (GRI) of Netherlands, for its Sustainability Report for 2012.

In 2019, Lucky Cement again won a second position in the cement category in the "Best Corporate & Sustainability Report Awards 2019" awarded by the Institute of Chartered Accountants of Pakistan (ICAP) and the Institute of Cost and Management Accountants of Pakistan (ICMAP).

== Subsidiaries ==
- Lucky Core Industries (55%), formerly known as ICI Pakistan
- Lucky Electric Power Company Limited (100%), a power plant in Karachi
- Lucky Motor Corporation (71.55%), manufactures Kia and Peugeot cars in Pakistan
- Lucky Rawji (50%), a cement factory in Democratic Republic of Congo
- Najmat Al Samawa (50%), a cement factory in Iraq
- Yunus Energy Limited (20%), a wind power plant in Jhimpir

== Investments ==
In October 2023, Lucky Cement's board of directors announced a decision to invest up to Rs. 4 billion in Lucky Core Ventures (Private) Limited and National Resources (Private) Limited, a Balochistan-based mining company.

In 2024, Lucky Cement and Fatima Fertilizer Company acquired a direct stake in National Resources (Private) Limited.

== Private corporate aircraft ==
Lucky Cement had plans for a proposed startup airline known as "Lucky Air" around 2019, but the airline never officially launched. Though Lucky Cement operates a small fleet of private corporate aircraft to facilitate efficient executive travel across remote industrial sites and global business hubs.

=== Fleet ===
Aircraft	Image	Quantity	Reg.	Note
Learjet 60XR		1	AP-BKB	
Bombardier Challenger 650		1	AP-LCL	
