= Fauji Foundation =

Conglomerate based in Rawalpindi

- فوجی فاؤنڈیشن
- Abbreviation: FF
- Formation: 1954; 72 years ago
- Founder: Government of Pakistan; Pakistan Armed Forces
- Type: Charitable trust
- Legal status: Welfare foundation
- Headquarters: Rawalpindi, Punjab, Pakistan
- Coordinates: 33.60624°N 73.0841°E
- Region served: Pakistan
- Managing Director & CEO: Lt Gen (r) Anwar Ali Hyder
- Parent organization: Pakistan Armed Forces
- Subsidiaries: Askari Bank; Fauji Fertilizer Company; Fauji Foods; Fauji Cement; Mari Petroleum
- Website: fauji.org.pk

Fauji Foundation (lit. 'Soldier Foundation'), also known as Fauji Group (Urdu pronunciation: [ˈfaʊ.dʒi] FOW-jee), is a Pakistani conglomerate based in Rawalpindi. It is active in fertilizer, cement, food, power generation, gas exploration, LPG marketing and distribution, financial services, security services and provides womb-to-tomb benefits to retired servicemen of Pakistan Armed Forces and their families.

Fauji Foundation was originally set up as a charitable organization to provide employment opportunities to Pakistani ex-military personnel and to generate funds for the welfare of widows, and families of martyrs. It also undertakes welfare projects in education, medical, training, and rehabilitation for military personnel.

== History ==
Fauji Foundation was established as a charitable trust in 1954 under the Charitable Endowments Act of 1889. It was established for the welfare of the Pakistan Armed Forces' three branches—Pakistan Navy, Pakistan Army, and Pakistan Air Force—and thus came under the management of the Ministry of Defence. The organization began with an initial paid-up capital of US$3.6 million (Rs 18 million) which it received from British colonial administration for supporting the widows and families of World War II veterans. With the funds it established a textile mill, a cereals mill, and a sugar mill.

In 1960, Fauji Foundation acquired a sugar mill from the Pakistan Industrial Development Corporation in Tando Muhammad Khan and later renamed it as Fauji Sugar Mills, Tando Muhammad Khan. It produced sugar under the brand "Crystal". It later also founded a sugarcane research station, named Nukerjee Research Farm.

In 1972, Fauji Foundation acquired a sugar mill in Khoski, Sindh and later renamed it Fauji Sugar Mills, Khoski. It produced sugar under the brand "Shireen". In the same year, Fauji Foundation also acquired a sugar mill based in Sangla Hill from Modern Motors Limited and it produced sugar under the brand "Chandi".

In 1974, Fauji Foundation inaugurated Foundation Gas Filling Plant in Rawalpindi. Later, in December 1974, Fauji Foundation inaugurated its third textile mill with equipment imported from China.

In 1980, Fauji Foundation founded an auto workshop in Rawalpindi, named Fauji Autos.

In 1982, Fauji Foundation incorporated Intec Limited to manufacture communication equipment such as trans-receivers and microprocessor-based PABXs in Pakistan. In April 1982, Fauji Foundation established a polypropylene bag manufacturing plant in Hub, Balochistan with an annual production capacity of 16.3 million. In June 1982, the first plant of Fauji Fertilizer Company in Goth Machi became operational. Also, in 1982, Fauji Foundation acquired Fauji Corn Complex in Jehangira which was originally developed by the Sarhad Development Authority. The project went bankrupt in 2012.

In 1983, Fauji Foundation established Fauji Metals in Rawalpindi to manufacture liquid petroleum gas cylinders with a manufacturing capacity of 7,500 cylinders per month. In May 1983, Fauji Foundation acquired a 40 percent stake in state-owned company, Mari Gas Company.

Fauji Foundation business remained relatively modest in scale until the late 1970s when it began to undergo major expansion. The assets of Fauji Foundation increased from Rs 152 million in 1970 to Rs 2,060 million by 1982, with 29 industrial units.

In 2004, Fauji Foundation sold Khoski Sugar Mill for PKR 300 million despite receiving the highest bid of PKR 387 million. In 2005, a corruption case was filed in the National Accountability Bureau (NAB) against then managing director Syed Muhammad Amjad who was involved in the corruption.

From 2011 to 2015, Fauji Foundation's assets grew 78 percent.

A 2017 study found that 33 of a group of 141 former Pakistan Armed Forces corps commanders, or 23.4%, were given jobs by the Foundation after their retirement from the military. At any one time, as many as seven former corps commanders serve as either the managing directors of the Fauji Foundation or the Army Welfare Trust or as managing directors of subsidiaries with personnel in these positions rotated out every three years.

== Management ==
Fauji Foundation is predominantly managed by the Pakistan Army, with about 85-90 percent of these positions filled by retired Army personnel. The managing director is usually a retired Army general, and the board of directors is chaired by the Federal Secretary of Defence, with members drawn from within the organization.

== Subsidiaries ==
=== Listed ===
- Fauji Fertilizer Company
  - Askari Bank (acquired from Army Welfare Trust)
    - Foundation Securities
    - Askari Exchange
  - Foundation Wind Energy - I
  - Foundation Wind Energy - II
  - FFC Energy Limited
  - Fauji Fresh n Freeze
  - Fauji Foods
    - Fauji Cereals
    - Fauji Infraavest Foods
  - Fauji Fertilizer Bin Qasim
    - FFBL Power Company Limited
    - Pakistan Maroc Phosphore, S.A., Morocco
- Fauji Cement
- Mari Petroleum

=== Unlisted ===
==== Fauji Meat ====
Fauji Meat Limited was established in 2013 as a subsidiary of Fauji Fertilizer Bin Qasim. In 2017, Fauji Meat began commercial operations with the inauguration of a processing plant in Port Qasim, Karachi at a cost of $75 million. The plant covers an area of 47 acres.

Fauji Meat also operates retail stores to sell meat, named Zabeeha.

==== Foundation Gas ====
Foundation Gas (Fongas) is a liquified petroleum gas (LPG) marketing and distribution company established in 1972. As of 2004, it held approximately 16% of the national market share, supported by a network of 460 distributors across regions including the Northern Areas, Federally Administered Tribal Areas (FATA), and Azad Kashmir. In the fiscal year 2003–04, Fongas distributed a total of 55,236 metric tons of LPG, which comprised 11,874 metric tons of imported LPG.

Fongas operates five plants with a combined storage capacity of 1,940 metric tons and a bottling capacity exceeding 175 metric tons per shift.

==== Overseas Employment Services ====
Overseas Employment Services was established in 1978 by the Fauji Foundation to export manpower from Pakistan.

==== Fauji Kabirwala Power ====
Fauji Kabirwala Power is a 170 MW combined cycle power plant located near Kabirwala in Khanewal District. It was set up in 1997 by Fauji Foundation as a joint venture with El Paso Electric, with an investment of US $170 million and a debt-equity ratio of 75:25. The majority of the debt financing was provided by the Asian Development Bank (ADB) and Export Development Canada (EDC). The plant began commercial operations in March 2000. In 2006, El Paso sold its entire shareholding of 42% to Globeleq which was later acquired by Aljomaih Automotive Company based in Saudi Arabia.

==== Fauji Foundation Experimental and Seed Multiplication Farm ====
The Fauji Foundation Experimental and Seed Multiplication Farm was established in 1959 to conduct experiments, research, testing, and development of new sugarcane varieties. It covers an area of 2,498 acres.

==== Fauji Akbar Portia Marine Terminal ====
Fauji Akbar Portia Marine Terminal was established in 2010 as a joint venture between Fauji Foundation, Akbar Group, and National Bank of Pakistan. The terminal provides services for the berthing, unloading, storage, and bagging of grains, cereals, oilseeds, and fertilizers. In 2020, Cargill acquired a 25 percent stake in the terminal.

==== Fauji Trans Terminal ====
Fauji Trans Terminal was established as a joint venture between Fauji Oil Terminal and Distribution Company (FOTCO) and Trans Group. The terminal's construction started in 2016 and it was built with a $25 million investment at Port Qasim. It serves as a bulk liquid storage and handling facility.

==== Fauji Oil Terminal ====
Fauji Oil Terminal & Distribution Company Limited was established in April 1995 as an oil terminal. Constructed on a build–own–operate basis for US $100 million, the facility has the capacity to handle 9 million metric tons of oil per year and can accommodate vessels up to 75,000 DWT at its jetty. The terminal has expanded to include a 4 km, 30-inch diameter pipeline for importing white oil at the existing jetty.

==== Foundation Power Company Daharki ====
Foundation Power Company Daharki operates a combined-cycle, low-Btu gas-fired power plant in Daharki, Ghotki, Sindh. The plant has an installed capacity of 186 MW and a net capacity of 180 MW. Construction began in October 2007, and in August 2008, an operation and maintenance contract was signed with Korea Plant Services & Engineering Company Limited, which was later renamed KEPCO Plant Services & Engineering Company Limited.

== Defunct ==
- Fauji Poly Propylene Product
- Fauji Security Services (acquired by Army Welfare Trust)
- FaujiSoft
- Fauji Sugar Mills, Tando Muhammad Khan
- Fauji Sugar Mills, Khoski
- Intec Limited

== Health care ==
The Fauji Foundation medical system began with the establishment of a 50-bed TB hospital in 1959 at Rawalpindi.

On health care, Fauji Foundation spends over 58% of the welfare budget. It is run by former officers of Pakistani Armed Forces.

== Education system ==
With over 130 branches spread from Karachi to Gilgit having approximately 74,897 students, 3,069 teachers and over 1100 administrative staff, the Fauji Foundation Education system is amongst the largest education systems in the country. The Fauji Foundation's education system aims to provide education to the children of ex-armed forces personnel, as well as to civilians.

The headquarters of Fauji Foundation is in Rawalpindi, Pakistan. FFES is affiliated with the Federal Board of Intermediate and Secondary Education (FBISE), Islamabad and Board of Intermediate and Secondary Education Rawalpindi as well. There are 102 schools (FF model schools) in Pakistan. The Fauji Foundation Colleges For Boys and Girls are located in New Lalazar, Rawalpindi.

- Foundation University, Islamabad
  - Foundation University Medical College
- Fauji Foundation College, Talagang
- Fauji Foundation College, Rawalpindi

== List of managing directors ==
- Brigadier F.R Khan, June 1963 to March 1970
- Major General Mian Ijaz Ahmed, April 1970 to June 1970
- Major General M. Nawaz Malik, September 1970 to July 1975
- Major General Rao Farman Ali Khan, June 1975 to January 1985
- Lieutenant General Ahmed Jamal Khan, January 1985 to January 1992
- Lieutenant General Imtiaz Waraich, January 1992 to March 1996
- Lieutenant General M Arif Bangash, April 1996 to December 1996
- Lieutenant General Khalid Latif Mughal, January 1997 to December 1998
- Lieutenant General Muhammad Maqbool, January 1999 to April 2002
- Lieutenant General Syed Muhammad Amjad, April 2002

== See also ==
- List of largest companies in Pakistan
- Army Welfare Trust
- Bahria Foundation
- Shaheen Foundation
- Defence Housing Authority
