= Askari Bank =

Commercial bank in Pakistan

Askari Bank Limited
- Formerly: Askari Commercial Bank (1991–2007)
- Type: Public limited company
- Traded as: PSX: AKBL; KSE 100 component
- Industry: Banking
- Founded: 9 October 1991; 34 years ago
- Headquarters: Islamabad, Pakistan
- Number of locations: 720 (2024)
- Area served: Pakistan
- Key people: Anwar Ali Hyder (Chairman); Zia Ijaz (CEO)
- Products: Loans, credit cards, debit cards, savings, Consumer Banking, Business Banking, Islamic Banking, Priority Banking etc.
- Revenue: ▲ Rs. 105.18 billion (US$380 million) (2025)
- Operating income: ▲ Rs. 55.10 billion (US$200 million) (2025)
- Net income: ▲ Rs. 22.80 billion (US$82 million) (2025)
- Total assets: ▲ Rs. 2.89 trillion (US$10 billion) (2025)
- Total equity: ▲ Rs. 151.74 billion (US$540 million) (2025)
- Owner: Fauji Consortium (71.91%)
- Number of employees: 9,163 (2025)
- Subsidiaries: Askari Exchange Company; Foundation Securities Limited (51%)
- Website: askaribank.com
- Footnotes; Financials as of 31 December 2025

Askari Bank Limited (Urdu pronunciation: [əs.ˈka.ri bɛŋk] us-KAH-ree-BANK) is a Pakistani commercial and retail bank headquartered in Islamabad. It is a subsidiary of Fauji Fertilizer Company, which is part of Fauji Foundation.

== History ==
=== 1991–2007: Askari Commercial Bank ===
Askari Bank was originally established by the Army Welfare Trust (AWT) as Askari Commercial Bank. The proposal for the bank came from Mirza Aslam Beg, who proposed to the Nawaz Sharif government that the armed forces needed a bank in which soldiers could invest their welfare funds. At about the same time, the AWT bid for a 30 percent stake in the state-owned United Bank Limited, but the government postponed the sale after concluding that no bid had met its prequalification conditions.

The bank was incorporated as a public limited company on October 9, 1991, received its banking licence on February 23, 1992, and began operating on April 1, 1992. Its shares were listed on the Karachi Stock Exchange on April 13, 1992, after a public issue of Rs150 million.

After Pakistan's nuclear tests in May 1998, the government froze foreign currency accounts, ending a scheme that had been very successful in attracting deposits to the bank. Askari was among the domestic private banks whose dollar deposits then made up 50 to 70 percent of their deposit base. Kalim-ur-Rahman became president and chief executive in March 1999. On April 3, 2003, the bank opened its first overseas branch, an offshore banking unit in Manama, Bahrain.

In 2006, Askari Bank received a licence for Islamic banking. In November 2006, Askari Bank established a wholly owned asset management firm named Askari Investment Management Limited.

=== 2007–present: Askari Bank ===
In June 2007, it changed its name from Askari Commercial Bank Limited to Askari Bank Limited. In June 2008, M. R. Mehkari, who had been with the bank since 1992, was appointed president and chief executive. The leasing company Askari Leasing was merged into the bank with effect from March 3, 2010. By late 2010, the bank had 200 branches, 18 of them Islamic banking branches.

In June 2013, Askari Bank was acquired by Fauji Foundation from Army Welfare Trust. Syed M. Husaini, a former president of KASB Bank, became president and chief executive on June 3, 2013. The new management made large provisions against bad loans, and the bank lost Rs4.1 billion in the first half of 2013. The bank also announced a rights issue of 55 percent. After a net loss of Rs5.4 billion for 2013, it returned to profit in 2014. In January 2017, Askari Bank sold its subsidiary Askari Investment Management to Pak Oman Asset Management for Rs. 551 million. Husaini left in March 2018, and Abid Sattar became chief executive in August 2018. By 2019, the bank had dropped out of the ten largest banks in Pakistan to eleventh place.

In November 2018, the security firm PakCERT reported that the details of 493 Askari Bank debit cards were among 19,864 Pakistani debit cards being sold on the dark web. The State Bank fined Askari Rs 29.8 million for breaching customer due diligence and know your customer rules between March and June 2020.

In September 2020, Askari Bank acquired Askari Securities. In January 2021, the Fauji Foundation moved to buy a majority stake in Silkbank, raising the possibility of a merger with Askari, but it abandoned the plan in April. Atif R. Bokhari succeeded Sattar as president and chief executive on September 1, 2021. In 2023, Askari Securities, a wholly owned subsidiary of the bank, was merged into the Fauji Foundation's Foundation Securities, in which the bank received a controlling stake. Bokhari resigned in May 2024, and Zia Ijaz, a former chief financial officer of the bank, became president and chief executive on February 17, 2025.

== Branches ==
As of 2022, Askari Bank has 719 Branches and more than 600 ATMs across Pakistan and a wholesale bank branch in Bahrain.

== See also ==
- List of banks in Pakistan
