= Shaheen Foundation =

Charitable wing of the Pakistan Air Force

- Shaheen Foundation, Pakistan Air Force
- بنیاد شاہین
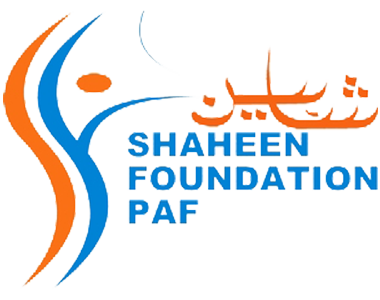
- Abbreviation: SF
- Formation: 1977; 49 years ago
- Founder: Pakistan Air Force
- Type: Charitable organization
- Legal status: Welfare foundation
- Headquarters: Islamabad, Pakistan
- Coordinates: 33.7106°N 73.0192°E
- Region served: Pakistan
- Managing Director: Air Marshal (r) Muhammad Arif Pervaiz
- Parent organization: Pakistan Air Force
- Subsidiaries: Shaheen Insurance; Shaheen Airport Services; FM 100 (radio network); Shaheen Complexes
- Website: shaheenfoundation.com

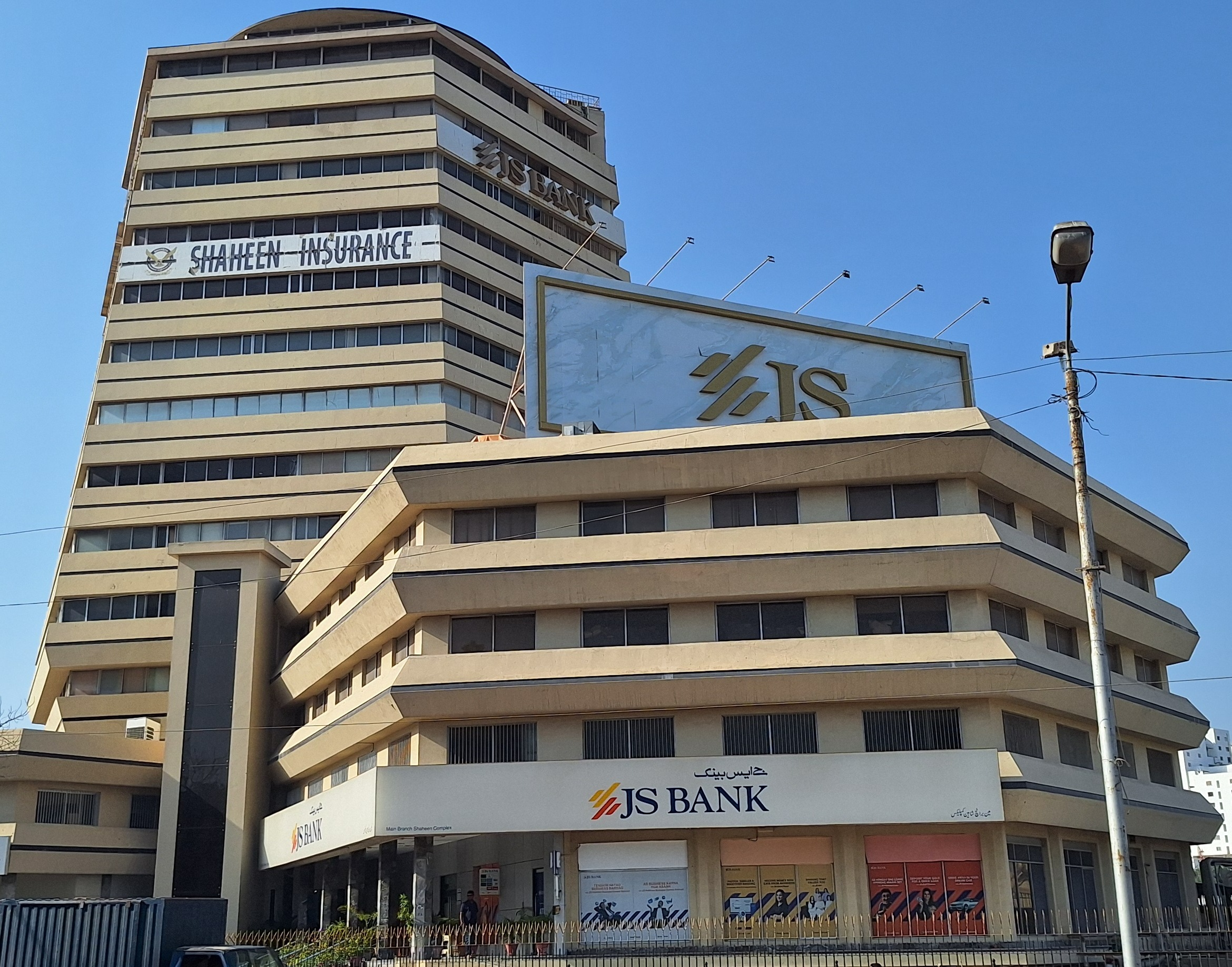
Shaheen Complex in Karachi

Shaheen Foundation (Urdu pronunciation: [ʃɑːˈhiːn] shah-HEEN) is a welfare foundation of the Pakistan Air Force. Shaheen Foundation works in different sectors ranging from education to aviation.

== History ==
Shaheen Foundation was founded in 1977 by the Pakistan Air Force under the Charitable Endowments Act of 1889, with an initial investment of Rs 5 million, about half of which was provided by the Government of Pakistan.

In 1993, Shaheen Foundation founded Shaheen Air. The airline's early operations were fraught with difficulties, exacerbated by a 50 percent fare discount for retired and serving military officers and high operating costs due to a limited number of aircraft on wet lease.

In 1995, Shaheen Foundation founded Shaheen Insurance in a joint venture with a South African insurance company, Hollard Group, which held 30 percent stake. Later, Hollard's management was dissatisfied with the investment, citing corruption as a major impediment to their investment's success. The negotiation of this partnership was notably managed on a one-to-one basis by an acting Pakistan Air Force officer, who was employed by the company after his retirement.

Later, Shaheen Foundation established the radio channel FM-100 and the satellite television network SB Pay-TV, with the help of Asif Ali Zardari, and his close aide. These businesses were marred by controversial agreements that led to financial losses for the foundation. In 2000, the foundation filed a legal complaint with the Securities and Exchange Commission of Pakistan under section 263 of the Companies Act, alleging violations of the agreement terms by a major shareholder.

== Subsidiaries ==
=== Listed ===
- Shaheen Insurance

=== Unlisted ===
- FM 100 radio
- Shaheen Airport Services
- SAPS Aviation College
- Shaheen Aerotraders
- Shaheen Knitwear
- Shaheen Splash
- Shaheen Complex, Karachi
- Shaheen Complex, Lahore
- Shaheen Medical Services
- Shaheen Foundation Security Services
- Shaheen Foundation Overseas Employment Agency
- Hawk Advertising
- Fazaia Welfare Education School System
- Al-Hamra (Islamabad)
- Air Eagle
- Air Eagle Aviation Academy
- Fazaia Housing Schemes
- Shaheen Welfare Housing Scheme, Peshawar.
- Shaheen Air International (former)
- SAMROC

== See also ==
- Al-Hamra
- Fauji Foundation
