= List of companies of Pakistan =

Location of Pakistan

Pakistan is a country in South Asia. It is a developing country and its economy is considered to be semi-industrialized, with centres of growth along the Indus River.

For further information on the types of business entities in this country and their abbreviations, see "Business entities in Pakistan".

== Notable firms ==
This list includes notable companies with primary headquarters located in the country. The industry and sector follow the Industry Classification Benchmark taxonomy. Organizations that have ceased operations are included and noted as defunct.

Notable companies Status: P=Private, S=State; A=Active, D=Defunct
Name	Industry	Sector	Headquarters	Founded	Notes	Status	
A. F. Ferguson & Co.	Financials	Asset managers	Karachi	1893	Accounting, financial services	P	A
Adamjee Group	Conglomerates	-	Karachi	1896	Automotive, chemicals, commodities, engineering, financials, industrials, pharmaceuticals, textile	P	A
Aero Asia	Consumer services	Airlines	Karachi	1993	Defunct 2007	P	D
Air Indus	Consumer services	Airlines	Karachi	2010	Defunct 2015	P	D
Airblue	Consumer services	Airlines	Karachi	2003	Private airline	P	A
AirSial	Consumer services	Airlines	Sialkot	2017	Private airline	P	A
Aisha Steel Mills	Basic materials	Iron & steel	Karachi	2005	Steel, owned by Arif Habib Group	P	A
AKD Group	Conglomerates	-	Karachi	1947	Energy, financials, infrastructure, mining, real estate & telecommunications	P	A
Al-Ghazi Tractors	Industrials	Commercial vehicles & parts	Karachi	1983	Tractors & agricultural equipment of CNH Industrial (Italy/USA) & diesel generating sets manufacturer, owned by Al-Futtaim Group (UAE)	P	A
Al Haj FAW Motors	Consumer goods	Automobiles	Karachi	2006	Automobiles manufacturer, subsidiary of Al-Haj Group	P	A
Allied Bank	Financials	Banks	Lahore	1942	Commercial bank	P	A
Amir Adnan	Consumer goods	Clothing & accessories	Karachi	1990	Apparel retail	P	A
Amreli Steels	Basic materials	Iron & steel	Karachi	1972	Steel	P	A
Arif Habib Corporation	Conglomerates	-	Karachi	1970	Aviation, chemicals, energy, fertilizers, financials, foods, power, real estate, steel	P	A
ARY Digital Network	Consumer services	Broadcasting & entertainment	Karachi	2000	Media, television, subsidiary of ARY Group (UAE)	P	A
Askari Bank	Financials	Banks	Rawalpindi	1991	Commercial bank, owned by Fauji Foundation	P	A
Army Welfare Trust	Conglomerates	-	Rawalpindi	1971	State-owned, Army's conglomerate	S	A
At-Tahur	Consumer goods	Food & beverages	Lahore	2007	Dairy products	P	A
Atlas Honda	Consumer goods	Automobiles	Karachi	1962	Motorcycles manufacturer, subsidiary of Atlas Group	P	A
Atlas Group	Conglomerates	-	Karachi	1962	Aluminium, automotive, engineering, financials, industrials, power	P	A
Attock Cement	Industrials	Cement	Karachi	1981	Cement, subsidiary of Attock Oil Company (UK)	P	A
Attock Petroleum	Energy	Oil refining & marketing	Rawalpindi	1998	Retail fuel marketing, refinery & petrochemicals product, subsidiary of Attock Oil Company (UK)	P	A
Attock Refinery	Energy	Oil refining	Rawalpindi	1922	Oil refinery, subsidiary of Attock Oil Company (UK)	P	A
Avanceon	Industrials	Industrial suppliers	Lahore	2003	Automation & controlling equipment supplier	P	A
Avari Hotels	Consumer services	Travel & leisure	Karachi	1944	Hospitality	P	A
Axact	Technology	Software	Karachi	1997	IT software, consulting & media holding company	P	A
Bahria Foundation	Conglomerates	-	Karachi	1982	State-owned, Navy's conglomerate	S	A
Bahria Town Group	Real Estate	Real estate holding & development	Rawalpindi	1996	Real estate developer	P	A
Bank AL Habib	Financials	Banks	Karachi	1991	Commercial bank, owned by House of Habib	P	A
Bank Alfalah	Financials	Banks	Karachi	1997	Commercial bank, owned by Abu Dhabi United Group (UAE)	P	A
Bank Makramah	Financials	Banks	Karachi	2006	Commercial bank, owned by Suroor Investment (Mauritius)	P	A
Bank of Azad Jammu & Kashmir	Financials	Banks	Muzaffarabad	2005	Commercial bank, owned by Government of Azad Kashmir	S	A
Bank of Khyber	Financials	Banks	Peshawar	1991	Commercial bank, owned by Government of Khyber Pakhtunkhwa	S	A
Bank of Punjab	Financials	Banks	Lahore	1989	Commercial bank, owned by Government of Punjab	S	A
BankIslami	Financials	Banks	Karachi	2006	Commercial bank, owned by JS Group	P	A
Bareezé	Consumer goods	Clothing & accessories	Lahore	1985	Apparel retail	P	A
Bestway Cement	Industrials	Cement	Islamabad	1993	Cement, subsidiary of Bestway Group (UK)	P	A
Bhoja Air	Consumer services	Airlines	Karachi	1993	Defunct 2012	P	D
Bibojee Group	Conglomerates	-	Karachi	1981	Automotive, constructions, financials, textile	P	A
BOL Network	Consumer services	Broadcasting & entertainment	Karachi	2013	Media, television, owned by Axact	P	A
Brighto Paints	Industrials	Paints & coatings	Lahore	1973	Paints manufacturer	P	A
Burj Bank	Financials	Banks	Karachi	2006	Defunct 2016, merged into Al Baraka Bank	P	D
Business Recorder	Consumer services	Publishing	Karachi	1965	Business related newspaper	P	A
Bykea	Technology	Delivery services, online services	Karachi	2016	Online ride-hailing & courier services	P	A
CA Sports	Consumer goods	Recreational products	Sialkot	1958	Sports goods, sportswear	P	A
Chenab Limited	Basic materials	Textile products	Faisalabad	1974	Textile manufacturer	P	A
Cnergyico	Energy	Oil refining & marketing	Karachi	1995	Retail fuel marketing, refinery & petrochemicals product	P	A
Colgate-Palmolive Pakistan	Consumer goods	Personal products	Karachi	1977	Personal care products, joint venture of Lakson Group & Colgate-Palmolive (USA)	P	A
CSD Pakistan	Retail	Diversified retailers	Karachi	1913	State-owned, Army's supermarket & hypermarket chain	S	A
Daily Jang	Consumer services	Publishing	Karachi	1939	Urdu newspaper, part of Jang Media Group	P	A
Dalda	Consumer goods	Food & beverages	Karachi	1937	Cooking Oil, ghee, dairy products & snacks, joint venture with Westbury Group	P	A
Dawlance	Consumer goods	Consumer electronics	Karachi	1980	Electronics & home appliances, owned by Arçelik (Turkey)	P	A
Dawn Media Group	Consumer services	Media	Karachi	1947	Media holding company	P	A
Defence Housing Authority	Real Estate	Real estate holding & development	Lahore	1975	State-owned, Army's real estate developer	S	A
Descon	Conglomerates	-	Lahore	1977	Chemicals, constructions, engineering, power	P	A
Dewan Farooque Motors	Consumer goods	Automobiles	Karachi	1998	Automobiles manufacturer, subsidiary of Yousuf Dewan Companies	P	A
DG Cement	Industrials	Cement	Lahore	1986	Cement, subsidiary of Nishat Group	P	A
Dolmen Group	Real Estate	Real estate holding & development	Karachi	1984	Shopping malls developer	P	A
DYL Motorcycles	Consumer goods	Automobiles	Hub	1976	Motorcycles manufacturer, subsidiary of Engro Corporation	P	A
EFU Insurance	Financials	General and life insurance	Karachi	1932	Life & health insurance, partially owned by JS Group	P	A
English Biscuit Manufacturers	Consumer goods	Food & beverages	Karachi	1966	Confectionery, Peek Freans brand	P	A
Engro Corporation	Conglomerates	-	Karachi	1957	Chemicals, energy, food, petroleum	P	A
Engro Fertilizers	Chemicals	Fertilizers	Karachi	2010	Subsidiary of Engro Corporation	P	A
Engro Polymer	Chemicals	Specialty chemicals	Karachi	1997	Chemicals & polymers, subsidiary of Engro Corporation	P	A
Eveready Pictures	Consumer services	Broadcasting & entertainment	Karachi	1947	Films and dramas production & distribution	P	A
Fatima Group	Conglomerates	-	Karachi	1936	Chemicals, textiles, sugar, energy, packaging, mining, trading	P	A
Fauji Fertilizer Company	Chemicals	Fertilizers	Rawalpindi	1978	Subsidiary of Fauji Foundation	P	A
Fauji Foods	Consumer goods	Food & beverages	Lahore	1966	Food products, subsidiary of Fauji Foundation	P	A
Fauji Foundation	Conglomerates	-	Rawalpindi	1954	State-owned, Army's conglomerate	S	A
Faysal Bank	Financials	Banks	Karachi	1994	Commercial bank	P	A
Fecto Group	Conglomerates	-	Lahore	1952	Agricultural equipment, cement, paper, sugar	P	A
Ferozsons	Consumer services	Publishing	Lahore	1894	Book publisher	P	A
First Women Bank	Financials	Banks	Karachi	1989	Financial bank, owned by International Holding Company (UAE)	P	A
Fly Jinnah	Consumer services	Airlines	Karachi	2021	Private airline, joint venture of Lakson Group & Air Arabia (UAE)	P	A
Forward Sports	Consumer goods	Recreational products	Sialkot	1991	Sports goods, sportswear	P	A
FrieslandCampina Engro Pakistan	Consumer goods	Food & beverages	Karachi	2005	Dairy products, joint venture of Engro Corporation & FrieslandCampina (Netherlands)	P	A
Frontier Works Organization	Industrials	Heavy construction	Rawalpindi	1966	State-owned transportation infrastructure developer	S	A
GTR	Consumer goods	Tires	Karachi	1963	Tyres manufacturer, joint venture of Bibojee Group & Continental AG (Germany)	P	A
Geo TV	Consumer services	Broadcasting & entertainment	Karachi	2002	Media, television, owned by Jang Media Group	P	A
Ghandhara Automobiles	Consumer goods	Automobiles	Karachi	1981	Automobiles manufacturer, subsidiary of Bibojee Group	P	A
Ghandhara Isuzu	Consumer goods	Automobiles	Karachi	1953	Automobiles manufacturer, subsidiary of Bibojee Group	P	A
Ghani Group	Conglomerates	-	Lahore	1959	Food, mining, rock salt products	P	A
Global Industrial Defence Solutions	Industrials	Aerospace & defense	Rawalpindi	2007	State-owned drone, electronics, military equipment & munitions manufacturer	S	A
Gourmet Foods	Consumer goods	Food & beverages	Lahore	1987	Bakery chain, food retailer	P	A
GSK Pakistan	Health care	Pharmaceuticals	Karachi	1951	Pharmaceuticals, owned by GSK (UK)	P	A
Gul Ahmed	Basic materials	Textile products	Karachi	1953	Textile manufacturer	P	A
Gwadar Port Authority	Industrials	Ports & shipping	Gwadar	2016	State-owned Gwadar, Balochistan seaport operations	S	A
HabibMetro	Financials	Banks	Karachi	1992	Commercial bank, subsidiary of Habib Bank AG Zurich (Switzerland) which is owned by House of Habib	P	A
Hamdard Laboratories	Consumer goods	Personal products	Karachi	1906	Herbal care products	P	A
Hascol Petroleum	Energy	Oil refining & marketing	Karachi	2001	Retail fuel marketing, refinery & petrochemicals product, authorized distributor & supplier of Fuchs Petrolub (Germany) lubricants	P	A
Hashoo Group	Conglomerates	-	Karachi	1960	Chemicals, financials, mining, pharmaceuticals, technology, tourism	P	A
Habib Bank	Financials	Banks	Karachi	1941	Commercial bank, owned by Aga Khan Fund for Economic Development (Switzerland)	P	A
Heavy Electrical Complex	Industrials	Electrical equipment & components	Haripur	?	Transformer manufacturer	P	A
Heavy Industries Taxila	Industrials	Defense	Taxila	1971	State-owned armoured defense equipment & military vehicles manufacturer	S	A
Heavy Mechanical Complex	Industrials	Industrial engineering	Taxila	1979	State-owned heavy construction equipment, heavy machinery, plant engineering & infrastructures	S	A
Hinopak Motors	Consumer goods	Automobiles	Karachi	1985	Automobiles manufacturer, subsidiary of Hino (Japan)	P	A
Honda Atlas Cars	Consumer goods	Automobiles	Karachi	1992	Automobiles manufacturer, subsidiary of Atlas Group	P	A
House of Habib	Conglomerates	-	Karachi	1841	Automotive, education, financials, industrials, petroleum, technology	P	A
Hub Power Company	Utilities	Conventional electricity	Hub	1991	Thermal power generation	P	A
Hum Network	Consumer services	Media	Karachi	2004	Media holding company	P	A
Hyundai Nishat Motors	Consumer goods	Automobiles	Lahore	2017	Automobiles manufacturer, subsidiary of Nishat Group	P	A
Lucky Core Industries	Chemicals	Diversified chemicals	Karachi	1944	Paints, polyesters, pharmaceuticals, agrichemicals and soda ash, owned by Yunus Brothers Group	P	A
Lucky Motor	Consumer goods	Automobiles	Karachi	2017	Automobiles manufacturer, subsidiary of Yunus Brothers Group	P	A
Imtiaz	Retail	Diversified retailers	Karachi	1955	Supermarket & hypermarket chain	P	A
Indus Motor	Consumer goods	Automobiles	Karachi	1990	Automobiles manufacturer, subsidiary of House of Habib	P	A
Industrial Development Bank of Pakistan	Financials	Banks	Karachi	1961	State-owned financial bank	S	A
Instaphone	Telecommunications	Fixed-line telecommunications	Islamabad	1991	Defunct 2008, joint venture of Arfeen Group & Millicom (Luxembourg)	P	D
Integrated Dynamics	Industrials	Aerospace & defense	Karachi	?	Drone, electronics & military equipment manufacturer	P	A
Interloop Limited	Basic materials	Textile products	Faisalabad	1992	Textile manufacturer	P	A
International Steels Limited	Basic materials	Iron & steel	Karachi	2007	Steel	P	A
Ismail Industries	Consumer goods	Food & beverages	Karachi	1988	Confectionery & snacks	P	A
Ittefaq Group	Basic materials	Iron & steel	Lahore	1939	Defunct 2004, acquired by Ittefaq Iron Industries	P	D
Ittefaq Iron Industries	Basic materials	Iron & steel	Lahore	2009	Steel, owned by Alshafi Group	P	A
Ittehad Chemicals	Chemicals	Diversified chemicals	Lahore	1964	Chemicals	P	A
Jang Media Group	Consumer services	Media	Karachi	1945	Media holding company, subsidiary of Independent Media Corporation (UAE)	P	A
Javedan	Real Estate	Real estate holding & development	Karachi	1961	Real estate developer	P	A
Jazz	Telecommunications	Mobile telecommunications	Islamabad	1994	Mobile networks, owned by VEON (Netherlands)	P	A
JS Bank	Financials	Banks	Karachi	2007	Commercial bank, owned by JS Group	P	A
JS Group	Financials	Diversified financial services	Karachi	1971	Banking, Brokerage, Asset management, financial management, investment	P	A
Jubilee Insurance	Financials	General and life insurance	Karachi	1995	Life & health insurance, owned by Aga Khan Fund for Economic Development (Switzerland)	P	A
K&N's	Consumer goods	Food & beverages	Karachi	1964	Poultry products	P	A
Karachi Port Trust	Industrials	Ports & shipping	Karachi	1887	State-owned Karachi seaport operations	S	A
Karachi Shipyard	Industrials	Shipbuilding	Karachi	1957	State-owned commercial & naval ship manufacturer	S	A
KASB Bank	Financials	Banks	Karachi	1994	Defunct 2015	P	D
K-Electric	Utilities	Conventional electricity	Karachi	1913	Thermal power generation, distribution & transmission infrastructures supplier, owned by The Abraaj Group (UAE)	P	A
Kaymu Pakistan	Technology	E-commerce	Karachi	2013	Defunct 2017, now merged into Daraz Pakistan, a subsidiary of Rocket Internet (Germany)	P	D
Khaadi	Consumer goods	Clothing & accessories	Karachi	1999	Apparel retail	P	A
Kohat Cement	Industrials	Cement	Kohat	1984	Cement	P	A
Kot Addu Power	Utilities	Conventional electricity	Kot Addu City	1996	Thermal power generation	P	A
Lakson Group	Conglomerates	-	Karachi	1954	Consumer goods, financials, food, industrials, media, technology, textile	P	A
Lalpir Power	Utilities	Conventional electricity	Mehmood Kot	1994	Defunct 2025	P	D
Loads Limited	Consumer goods	Auto parts	Karachi	1979	Automobile components & parts manufacturer	P	A
Lotte Chemical Pakistan	Chemicals	Diversified chemicals	Karachi	1998	Chemicals, owned by Lotte Chemical (South Korea)	P	A
Lotte Kolson	Consumer goods	Food & beverages	Karachi	1942	Confectionery & snacks, joint venture with Lotte Group (South Korea)	P	A
LSE Group	Financials	Diversified financial services	Lahore	1970	Brokerage, asset management, financial management, investment	P	A
Lucky Cement	Industrials	Cement	Karachi	1993	Cement, subsidiary of Yunus Brothers Group	P	A
Maple Leaf Cement	Industrials	Cement	Lahore	1956	Cement, subsidiary of Saigol Group	P	A
Maria B	Consumer goods	Clothing & accessories	Lahore	1999	Apparel retail	P	A
Mari Energies	Energy	Oil & gas exploration & production	Islamabad	1984	Oil and gas exploration & production	P	A
Martin Dow	Health care	Pharmaceuticals, Medical equipment	Karachi	1995	Multi-national pharmaceutical & medical devices & accessories manufacturer	P	A
Masood Textile Mills	Basic materials	Textile products	Faisalabad	1985	Textile manufacturer	P	A
Master Motors	Consumer goods	Automobiles	Karachi	2002	Automobiles manufacturer, subsidiary of Master Group	P	A
MCB Bank	Financials	Banks	Karachi	1947	Commercial bank, owned by Nishat Group	P	A
Meezan Bank	Financials	Banks	Karachi	1997	Commercial bank	P	A
MG Motors Pakistan	Consumer goods	Automobiles	Lahore	2020	Automobiles manufacturer, subsidiary of JW-SEZ Group	P	A
Millat Tractors	Industrials	Commercial vehicles & parts	Lahore	1965	Tractors & agricultural equipment of Massey Ferguson (USA), diesel engines, generating sets & forklift vehicles manufacturer	P	A
Mitchell's	Consumer goods	Food & beverages	Lahore	1933	Food processing	P	A
Mughal Steel	Basic materials	Iron & steel	Lahore	1950	Steel	P	A
Muhammadi Steamship	Transportation	Marine transportation	Karachi	1947	Defunct 1974, merged into PNSC	P	D
Murree Brewery	Consumer goods	Brewers	Rawalpindi	1860	Non-alcoholic brewers & soft drinks	P	A
National Bank of Pakistan	Financials	Banks	Karachi	1949	State-owned commercial bank	S	A
NESPAK	Industrials	Heavy construction	Lahore	1973	State-owned multinational construction, engineering & contracting services	S	A
National Foods	Consumer goods	Food & beverages	Karachi	1970	Spices	P	A
National Logistics Corporation	Industrials	Transportation services	Rawalpindi	1978	State-owned freight & rail transportation & logistics	S	A
National Radio & Telecommunication Corporation	Industrials	Electronic equipment & components	Islamabad	1966	State-owned defense technologies, radio & telecommunications equipment manufacturer	S	A
National Refinery	Energy	Oil refining	karachi	1963	Oil refinery, subsidiary of Attock Oil Company (UK)	P	A
National Engineering and Scientific Commission	Industrials	Aerospace & defense	Islamabad	2001	State-owned aerospace & defense products manufacturer	S	A
Nayatel	Telecommunications	Fixed-line telecommunications	Islamabad	2006	Telecommunications, internet & cable television	P	A
Network Television Marketing	Consumer services	Broadcasting & entertainment	Karachi	1990	Defunct 1999	P	D
NIB Bank	Financials	Banks	Karachi	2003	Defunct 2017, merged into MCB Bank	P	D
Nishat Group	Conglomerates	-	Lahore	1951	Automotive, cement, chemicals, commodities, financials, food, power, technology, textile	P	A
Nishat Mills Limited	Basic materials	Textile products	Lahore	1951	Textile manufacturer, subsidiary of Nishat Group	P	A
National Transmission & Dispatch Company	Industrials	Industrial suppliers	Lahore	1998	State-owned power transmission infrastructures supplier	S	A
Nestlé Pakistan	Consumer goods	Food & beverages	Lahore	1979	Dairy products, owned by Nestlé (Switzerland)	P	A
Nexus Automotive	Consumer goods	Automobiles	Karachi	1999	Defunct 2006, joint venture of local investors & Balubaid (Saudi Arabia), General Motors (USA)	P	D
Oil & Gas Development Company	Energy	Oil & gas exploration & production	Islamabad	1961	State-owned oil and gas exploration & production	S	A
Pace Pakistan	Real Estate	Real estate holding & development	Lahore	1992	Shopping malls developer	P	A
Packages Limited	Industrials	Containers & packaging	Lahore	1956	Packaging & paper products manufacturer	P	A
Pak Datacom	Telecommunications	Fixed-line telecommunications	Islamabad	1992	State-owned telecommunications & internet	S	A
Pak Suzuki Motors	Consumer goods	Automobiles	Karachi	1983	Automobiles & motorcycles manufacturer, subsidiary of Suzuki (Japan)	P	A
Pakistan Aeronautical Complex	Industrials	Aerospace & defense	Kamra	1971	State-owned aircraft, drone & avionics manufacturer	S	A
Pakistan Atomic Energy Commission	Utilities	Conventional electricity, Nuclear industry	Islamabad	1956	State-owned nuclear-based power generation, nuclear research & studies	S	A
Pakistan Chrome Mines	Basic materials	Mining	Muslim Bagh	1902	Mining of Chromite & Magnesite	P	A
Pakistan Engineering Company	Industrials	Industrial machinery	Lahore	1932	transmission infrastructures, mechanical engineering, engines, turbines	S	A
Pakistan Gems and Jewellery Development Company	Consumer goods	Luxury items	Karachi	2007	State-owned gems and jewelry development, subsidiary of PIDC	S	A
Pakistan Industrial Credit and Investment Corporation	Financials	Diversified financial services	Karachi	1957	Consumer finance, Investment services, mortgage, specialty finance, owned by Temasek Holdings (Singapore)	P	A
Pakistan Industrial Development Corporation	Financials	Diversified financial services	Karachi	1952	State-owned large capital investment services	S	A
Pakistan International Airlines	Consumer services	Airlines	Karachi	1946	Private flag-carrier airline, owned by Arif Habib Group, previously known as Orient Airways	P	A
Pakistan International Container Terminal	Industrials	Ports & shipping	Karachi	2002	Karachi seaport operations, owned by Karachi Port Trust	P	A
Pakistan Locomotive Factory	Industrials	Railroad equipment	Risalpur	1993	State-owned rail vehicles & equipment manufacturer	S	A
Pakistan Mineral Development Corporation	Basic materials	Mining	Islamabad	1974	State-owned general mining, notably owning Khewra Salt Mine	S	A
Pakistan Mineral Water Bottling Plant	Consumer goods	Food & beverages	Karachi	1985	Soft drinks, Amrat Cola brand	P	A
Pakistan National Shipping Corporation	Transportation	Marine transportation	Karachi	1971	State-owned cargo/shipping	S	A
Pakistan Oilfields Limited	Energy	Oil & gas exploration & production	Rawalpindi	1950	Oil and gas exploration & production, subsidiary of Attock Oil Company (UK)	P	A
Pakistan Ordnance Factories	Industrials	Defense	Wah Cantonment	1951	State-owned firearms, ammunition & military equipment manufacturer	S	A
Pakistan Petroleum	Energy	Oil & gas exploration & production	Karachi	1950	State-owned oil and gas exploration & production	S	A
Pakistan Post	Transportation	Delivery services	Islamabad	1947	State-owned postal & courier	S	A
Pakistan Railways	Industrials	Railroads	Lahore	1861	State-owned railway services	S	A
Pakistan Refinery	Energy	Oil refining	karachi	1960	State-owned oil refinery, subsidiary of Pakistan State Oil	S	A
Pakistan State Oil	Energy	Oil refining & marketing	Karachi	1974	State-owned retail fuel marketing, refinery & petrochemicals product	S	A
Pakistan Steel Mills	Basic materials	Iron & steel	Karachi	1973	State-owned steel	S	A
Pakistan Television Corporation	Consumer services	Media	Islamabad	1964	State-owned media holding company	S	A
Pakola	Consumer goods	Food & beverages	Karachi	1950	Soft drinks	P	A
Paktel	Telecommunications	Mobile telecommunications	Islamabad	1989	Defunct 2008, joint venture of Hasan Associates & Cable & Wireless (UK), now rebranded as Zong	P	D
PakWheels	Consumer services	Auto services	Lahore	2003	Online automobile trading & services	P	A
Pak-Arab Refinery	Energy	Oil refining	Karachi	1974	State-owned oil refinery, joint venture with Mubadala Investment Company (UAE)	S	A
PARCO Gunvor	Energy	Oil refining & marketing	Karachi	2002	Retail fuel marketing, refinery & petrochemicals product, joint venture of Pak-Arab Refinery & Gunvor (Switzerland)	P	A
Pearl-Continental Hotels & Resorts	Consumer services	Travel & leisure	Islamabad	1958	Hospitality, owned by Hashoo Group	P	A
PEL	Consumer goods	Consumer electronics	Lahore	1956	Electronics, electrical goods & Home appliances, owned by Saigol Group	P	A
Pakistan Electric Power Company	Utilities	Conventional electricity	Lahore	1998	State-owned thermal power generation & distribution, distributed into GENCO, DISCO & PITC	S	A
PHA Foundation	Real Estate	Real estate holding & development	Islamabad	1999	State-owned real estate developer	S	A
PICIC Commercial Bank	Financials	Banks	Karachi	1993	Defunct 2007, merged into NIB Bank	P	D
Port Qasim Authority	Industrials	Ports & shipping	Karachi	1980	State-owned Port Qasim, Karachi seaport operations	S	A
PTCL	Telecommunications	Fixed-line telecommunications	Islamabad	1949	State-owned telecommunications, internet & cable television, joint venture with Etisalat (UAE)	S	A
QMobile	Consumer goods	Consumer electronics	Karachi	2009	Mobile handsets, tablets & accessories	P	A
Rastah	Consumer goods	Clothing & accessories	Lahore	2018	Apparel retail	P	A
Rayyan Air	Consumer services	Airlines	Islamabad	2009	Defunct 2016	P	D
Saif Group	Conglomerates	-	Islamabad	1927	Energy, healthcare, real-estate, textile	P	A
Saigol Group	Conglomerates	-	Lahore	1930	Cement, chemicals, consumer goods, energy, engineering, food, technology, textile	P	A
Saindak Metals	Basic materials	Mining	Saindak	1995	State-owned mining of Copper, Gold & Silver, joint venture with Metallurgical Corporation of China (China)	S	A
Sana Safinaz	Consumer goods	Clothing & accessories	Karachi	1989	Apparel retail	P	A
Sapphire Retail	Consumer goods	Clothing & accessories	Lahore	2014	Apparel retail, subsidiary of Sapphire Textile	P	A
Sapphire Textile	Basic materials	Textile products	Lahore	1940	Textile manufacturer, subsidiary of Sapphire Group	P	A
Sazgar	Consumer goods	Automobiles	Lahore	1991	Autorickshaws manufacturer	P	A
SereneAir	Consumer services	Airlines	Islamabad	2017	Private airline	P	A
Servis Industries Limited	Conglomerates	-	Lahore	1941	Footwear, leather goods, tyres	P	A
Shaheen Air	Consumer services	Airlines	Karachi	1993	Defunct 2018	P	D
Shaheen Foundation	Conglomerates	-	Islamabad	1977	State-owned, Air Force's conglomerate	S	A
Shakarganj Limited	Conglomerates	-	Jhang	1967	Bio fuel, food, sugar, textile	P	A
Shan Foods	Consumer goods	Food & beverages	Karachi	1981	Spices	P	A
Wafi Energy Pakistan	Energy	Oil refining & marketing	Karachi	1899	Retail fuel marketing as (Shell), refinery & petrochemicals product. Previously known as Pakistan Burmah Shell, owned by Wafi Energy Holding (Saudi Arabia)	P	A
Shezan International	Consumer goods	Food & beverages	Lahore	1964	Food processing, soft drinks	P	A
Shifa International Hospitals	Health care	Health care providers	Islamabad	1993	Hospitals	P	A
Siemens Pakistan	Industrials	Industrial engineering	karachi	1953	Engineering services, industrial equipment, automation, electrical components, owned by Siemens (Germany)	P	A
Sigma Motors	Consumer goods	Auto services	Islamabad	1994	Authorized distributor of Land Rover (UK) SUVs.	P	A
Silkbank	Financials	Banks	Karachi	1994	Defunct 2024, merged into United Bank	P	D
Sindh Bank	Financials	Banks	Lahore	1989	Commercial bank, owned by Government of Sindh	S	A
Sindh Engro Coal Mining Company	Energy	Coal	Karachi	2009	State-owned coal mining & coal power generation, joint venture with Engro Corporation	S	A
Sohrab Cycles	Consumer goods	Recreational products	Lahore	1952	Bicycles, tricycles, rehabilitation products.	P	A
Soneri Bank	Financials	Banks	Karachi	1992	Commercial bank	P	A
South City Hospital	Health care	Health care providers	Karachi	2004	Hospitals	P	A
Standard Chartered Pakistan	Financials	Banks	Karachi	1863	Commercial bank, subsidiary of Standard Chartered (UK)	P	A
State Bank of Pakistan	Financials	Banks	Karachi	1948	State-owned central bank	S	A
State Life	Financials	General and life insurance	Karachi	1972	State-owned life & health insurance	S	A
Sui Northern Gas Pipelines	Utilities	Gas distribution	Lahore	1963	State-owned distributor of natural gas northern regions	S	A
Sui Southern Gas Company	Utilities	Gas distribution	Karachi	1954	State-owned distributor of natural gas southern regions	S	A
SUPARCO	Industrials	Aerospace, Space industry	Karachi	1961	State-owned aerospace & atmospheric research agency	S	A
Super Asia Group	Conglomerates	-	Gujranwala	1975	Consumer goods, fast food chains	P	A
Systems Ltd	Technology	Software	Lahore	1977	Software conglomerate	P	A
Tapal Tea	Consumer goods	Food & beverages	Karachi	1947	Tea marketing	P	A
TCS Courier	Transportation	Delivery services	Karachi	2000	Courier	P	A
Telenor Pakistan	Telecommunications	Mobile telecommunications	Islamabad	2004	Mobile networks, owned by PTCL	P	A
The Express Tribune	Consumer services	Publishing	Karachi	2010	English newspaper, part of Lakson Group	P	A
The News International	Consumer services	Publishing	Karachi	1991	English newspaper, part of Jang Media Group	P	A
TPL Properties	Real Estate	Real estate holding & development	Karachi	2007	Real estate developer	P	A
TPS Pakistan	Technology	Software	Karachi	1996	IT software, consulting, E-Commerce, financial solutions	P	A
Treet Corporation	Conglomerates	-	Lahore	1952	Automotive, packaging, personal care, pharmaceutical, trading	P	A
TRG Pakistan	Industrials	Diversified financial services	Karachi	2002	Brokerage, asset management, financial management, investment	P	A
Tuwairqi Steel Mills	Basic materials	Iron & steel	Karachi	1979	Steel, joint venture of Arif Habib Group & Al-Tuwairqi Holdings (Saudi Arabia), POSCO (South Korea)	P	A
Ufone	Telecommunications	Mobile telecommunications	Islamabad	2001	Mobile networks, owned by PTCL	P	A
Unilever Pakistan	Consumer goods	Food & beverages, Personal products	Karachi	1948	Food & personal care products, Onwed by unilever (UK)	P	A
Union Bank	Financials	Banks	Karachi	1991	Defunct 2006, merged into Standard Chartered Pakistan	P	D
United Auto Industries	Consumer goods	Automobiles	Lahore	1999	Autorickshaws & motorcycles manufacturer	P	A
United Bank	Financials	Banks	Karachi	1959	Commercial bank	P	A
Unity Foods	Consumer goods	Food & beverages	Karachi	1991	Cooking oil, ghee & staples, owned by Wilmar International (Singapore)	P	A
Utility Stores Corporation	Consumer services	Food retailers & wholesalers	Islamabad	1973	Defunct 2025	S	D
Volvo Pakistan	Consumer goods	Automobiles	Karachi	1985	Automobiles manufacturer & authorized distributor of Volvo (Sweden), subsidiary of Panasian Group	P	A
Water and Power Development Authority	Utilities	Conventional electricity, Water	Lahore	1958	State-owned hydropower generation & water management	S	A
wi-tribe	Telecommunications	Fixed-line telecommunications	Islamabad	2007	ISP, defunct 2021, now rebranded as Qubee	P	D
WorldCall	Telecommunications	Fixed-line telecommunications	Lahore	1996	Telecommunications & internet	P	A
Yunus Brothers Group	Conglomerates	-	Karachi	1993	Automotive, cement, chemicals, industrials, sugar, textile	P	A
Yousuf Dewan Companies	Conglomerates	-	Karachi	1912	Automotive, cement, chemicals, industrials, sugar, textile	P	A
Zarai Taraqiati Bank	Financials	Banks	Islamabad	1961	State-owned agricultural support bank	S	A
Zong	Telecommunications	Mobile telecommunications	Islamabad	2008	Mobile networks, owned by China Mobile (China), previously known as Paktel	P	A

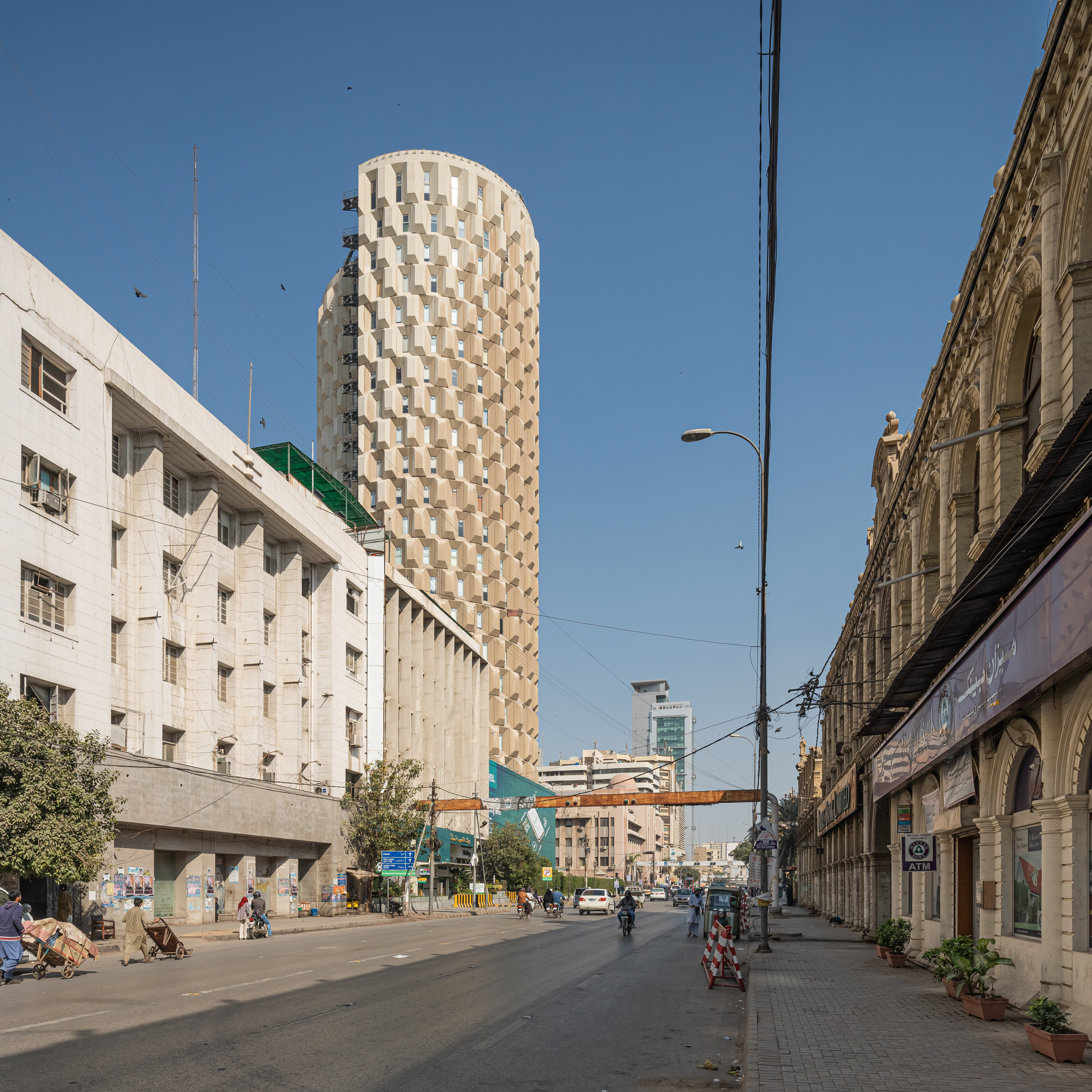
I. I. Chundrigar Road, Saddar Karachi.

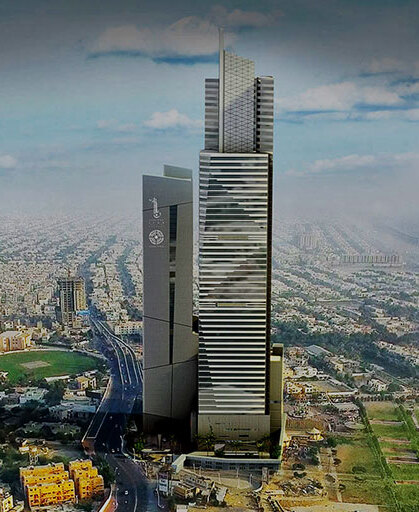
Bahria Icon Tower, Clifton Karachi.

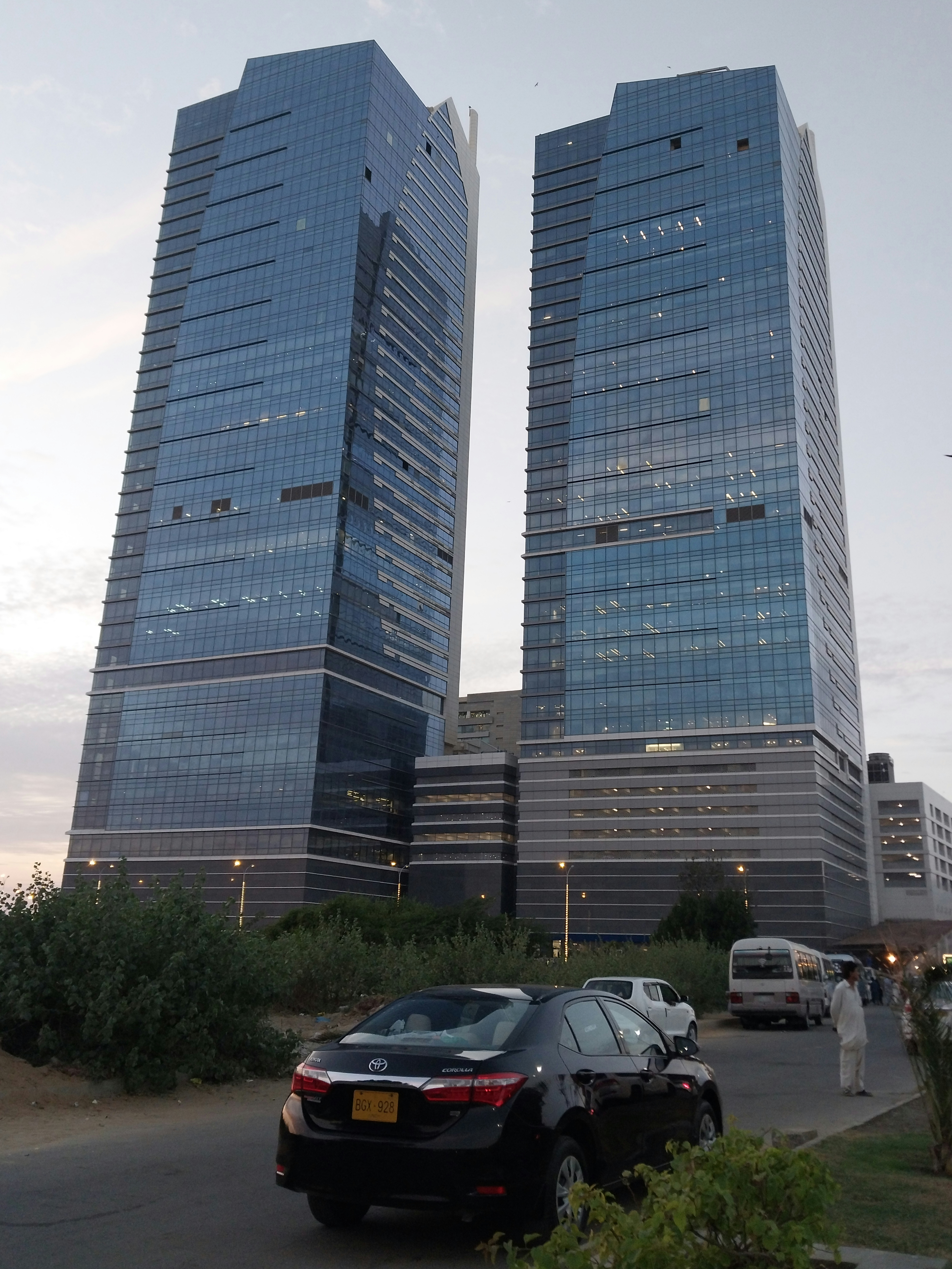
Dolmen Twin Towers, Clifton Karachi.

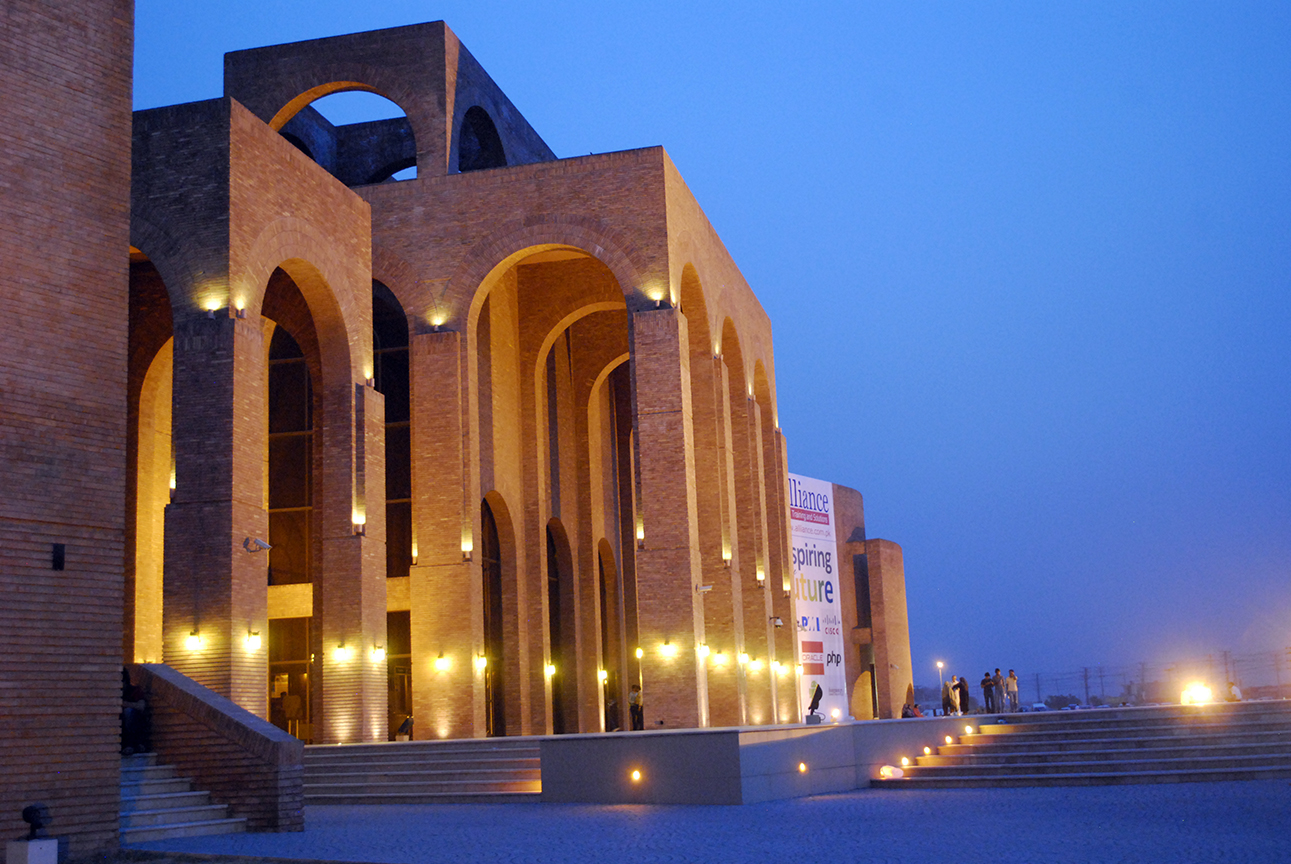
Expo Centre Lahore.

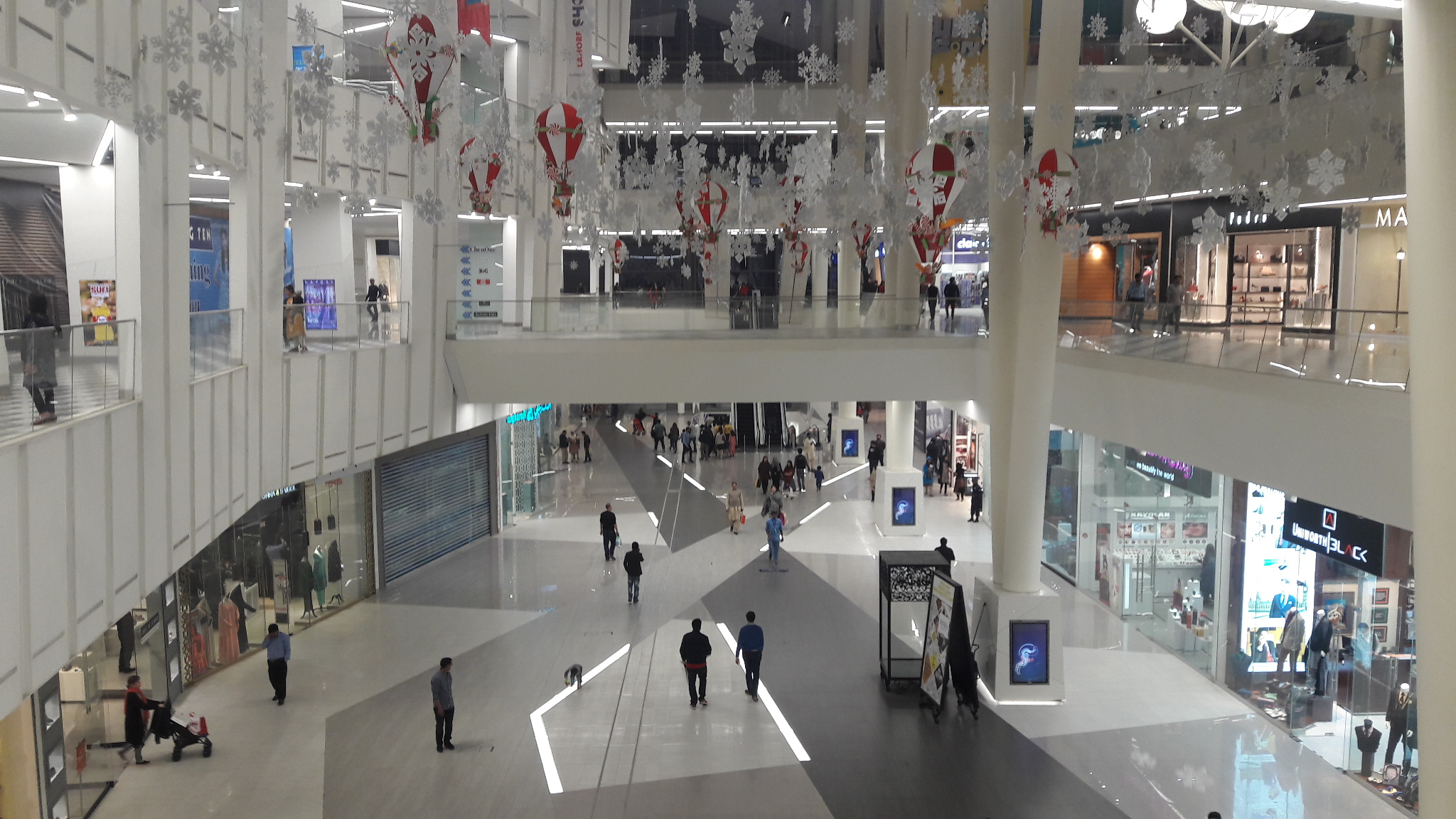
Emporium Mall Lahore.

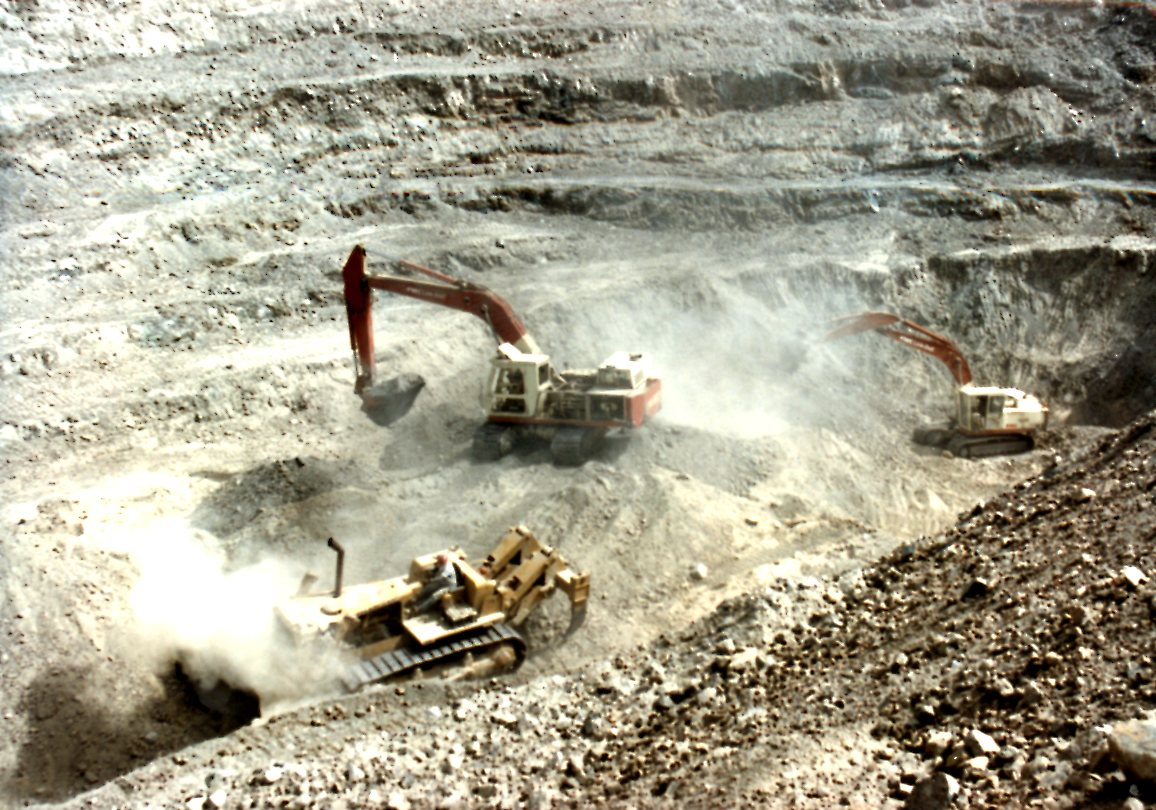
Surface mining in Sindh.

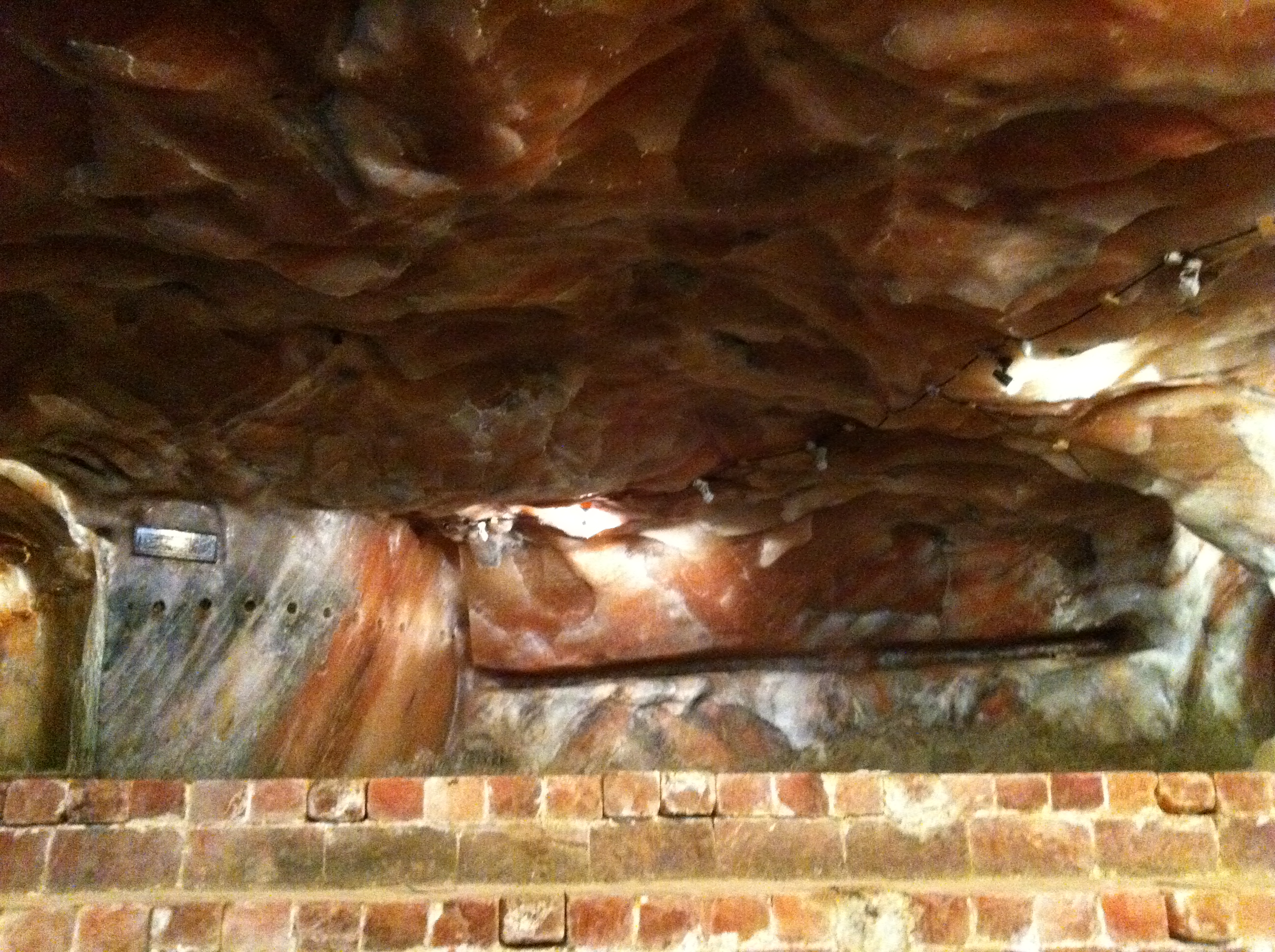
Khewra Salt Mine in Punjab.

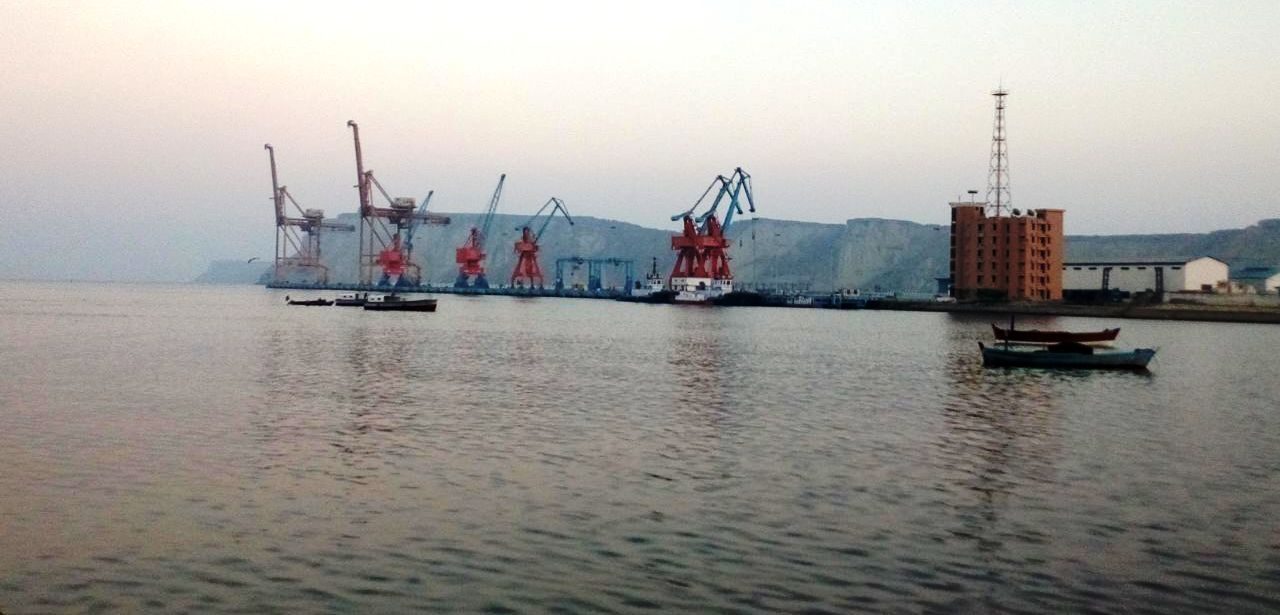
Gwadar Port in Balochistan.

== See also ==
- List of banks in Pakistan
- List of hospitals in Pakistan
