= List of banks in Pakistan =

The following list contains all the notable banks in Pakistan. Sindh's financial sector with its roots in I. I. Chundrigar Road has for many years ranked in top indices and has led to the amalgamation of indices into the Pakistani Stock Exchange. Pakistan's banking industry includes many a prominent names such as Bestway Group Limited, Allied Bank Limited, Askari Bank, MCB Bank Limited, Habib Bank Limited, Habib Metro, Faysal Bank, National Bank of Pakistan, State Bank of Pakistan , Bank Alfalah. Pakistan Stock Exchange was established on September 18, 1947, and was formally incorporated on March 10, 1949, under the name of Karachi Stock Exchange, as a Company limited by Guarantee. In October 1970, a second stock exchange was established in Lahore to meet the stock trading needs of the provincial metropolis. In October 1988, Islamabad Stock Exchange was established to cater to the investors of the northern parts of the country. Because the three exchanges had separate management, trading interfaces, indices, and had no mutualized structure, therefore the Stock Exchanges (Corporatization, Demutualization and Integration) Act, 2012 was promulgated by the Government of Pakistan which ultimately resulted in the three exchanges integrating their operations from

On January 11, 2016, under the new name "Pakistan Stock Exchange Limited" (PSX), the State Bank of Pakistan is the Central Bank of Pakistan.

== Systemically Important Banks ==
=== Domestically Systemically Important Banks ===
Name	Headquarters
Habib Bank Limited (HBL)	Karachi
National Bank of Pakistan (NBP)	Karachi
United Bank Limited (UBL)	Karachi
MCB Bank Limited (MCB)	Lahore

== Scheduled Banks ==
=== Public Sector Banks ===
Name	Headquarters
National Bank of Pakistan (NBP)	Karachi
Bank of Punjab (BOP)	Lahore
Sindh Bank	Karachi
Bank of Khyber (BOK)	Peshawar
First Women Bank	Karachi
Zarai Taraqiati Bank Limited (ZTBL)	Islamabad
Industrial Development Bank of Pakistan	Karachi

=== Private Banks ===
Name	Headquarters
Allied Bank Limited (ABL)	Lahore
Askari Bank (Fauji Group)	Islamabad
Bank Alfalah Limited (BAFL)	Karachi
Bank Al-Habib Limited (BAHL)	Karachi
Habib Bank Limited (HBL)	Karachi
Habib Metropolitan Bank Limited	Karachi
JS Bank Limited (JSBL)	Karachi
MCB Bank Limited (MCB)	Lahore
Soneri Bank	Karachi
Standard Chartered Pakistan (SC Pakistan)	Karachi
United Bank Limited (UBL)	Karachi

== Public Sector Non-Schedule Banks ==
1. Bank of Azad Jammu and Kashmir

== Private Banks ==
1. Habib Bank AG Zurich (Parent of HabibMetro)
2. Silkbank (Subsidiary of United Bank Limited)

== Islamic banks ==
Many Islamic Banks are working in Pakistan. The list of banks is given below:

1. Meezan Bank Limited
2. Soneri Mustaqeem Islamic Bank
3. Dubai Islamic Bank
4. Al Baraka Bank (Pakistan) Limited - Al Baraka Bank
5. Bank Alfalah Islamic
6. Bank Makramah Limited (BML)
7. BankIslami Pakistan Limited
8. Askari Bank Limited
9. MCB Islamic Banking
10. UBL Islamic Banking
11. HBL Islamic Banking
12. NBP Islamic Banking
13. Bank Al Habib Islamic Banking
14. Bank of Punjab Islamic Banking
15. Faysal Bank (Islamic)
16. HabibMetro (Sirat Islamic Banking)
17. Silk Bank (Emaan Islamic Banking)
18. Bank Of Khyber (Islamic Window)

These are the names of Islamic banks having accreditation licenses from the State Bank of Pakistan.

== Foreign banks ==
1. Deutsche Bank AG (Deutsche Bank Pakistan) (Germany)
2. Citibank, N.A. (CitiBank, N.A., Pakistan) (United States)
3. Industrial and Commercial Bank of China Limited (ICBC Pakistan)
4. Bank of China (Bank of China Pakistan Branch)
5. The Hong Kong and Shanghai Bank (HSBC Bank Pakistan) (United Kingdom)
6. The Bank of Tokyo-Mitsubishi UFJ (MUFG Bank Pakistan) (Japan)
7. Saudi National Bank (Samba Financial Group|Samba Bank (Pakistan) Limited) (Saudi Arabia)
8. Standard Chartered Bank (Standard Chartered Bank Pakistan) (United Kingdom)

== Development finance institutions ==
1. House Building Finance Company
2. National Credit Guarantee Company

== See also ==
- Banking in Pakistan
- Defunct banks of Pakistan
- List of companies of Pakistan
- Economy of Pakistan
- Index of the Karachi Stock Exchange
- Islamic banking
