= Genco (disambiguation) =

Genco is a Japanese anime company.

Genco may also refer to:

- Generation company, a power generation company in a deregulated market
  - Generation companies (Pakistan)
- The Generating Company (GenCo), an international touring circus company
- Genco Abbandando, a character in The Godfather franchise
- Genco University, in Nairobi, Kenya
- FedEx Supply Chain, formerly General Commodities Warehouse & Distribution Co., an American third-party logistics provider
- Genco, a Chicago-based manufacturer of pinball and electro-mechanical games, now part of Chicago Coin

== People ==
- Caroline Genco, American microbiologist and academic administrator
- Genco Ecer (born 1985), Turkish Cypriot singer and athlete
- Genco Erkal (born 1938), Turkish actor
- Genco Gulan (born 1969), Turkish contemporary artist

== See also ==
- NNB Generation Company (NNB GenCo), a subsidiary of EDF Energy in the UK
- GENCODE
- Gen Con
