= PHA =

PHA may refer to:

== Science and technology ==
- Phytohaemagglutinin, a type of lectin in plants
- Polyhydroxyalkanoate, natural polyesters
- Potentially hazardous asteroid
- Process hazard analysis of an industrial process
- Pseudohypoaldosteronism, a condition that mimics hypoaldosteronism but with high levels of aldosteron
- Pulse-height analyzer, an electronic instrument

== Organizations ==
- Partnership for a Healthier America, US
- Pakistan Housing Authority
- Parks and Horticulture Authority, Lahore, Pakistan
- Philadelphia Housing Authority, US
- Prince Hall Affiliated, US
- Private Hospitals Association (Jordan)
- Pulmonary Hypertension Association, US
- Puntland Highway Authority, Somalia

== Placenames ==
- Amphoe Pha Khao, Loei Province, Thailand
- Amphoe Phu Pha Man, Khon Kaen Province, Thailand
- Amphoe Tha Wang Pha, Nan Province, northern Thailand
- Amphoe Thong Pha Phum, Kanchanaburi Province, Thailand
- Cẩm Phả, Quảng Ninh Province, Vietnam
- Ko Pha Ngan, an island in the Gulf of Thailand
- Pha Oudom District, Bokeo Province, Laos
- Pha Taem, a national park in Thailand
- Pha That Luang, a Buddhist stupa in Vientiane, and a national symbol of Laos
- Than Sadet–Ko Pha-ngan National Park, Thailand

== People ==
- Hso Khan Pha (1938–2016), Burmese geologist
- Jazze Pha (stage name of Phalon Anton Alexander), American rapper, songwriter and producer
  - Jazze Pha production discography
- Pha Terrell (1910–1945), American jazz singer

== Other ==
- Anime Syuukan DX! Mi-Pha-Pu, a Japanese anime series
- Pha Lai Power Station, Vietnam
- Peripheral Heart Action Training in bodybuilding
- Pha (Indic), a consonant
