= Khadijah Shah =

Pakistani American fashion designer

- خدیجه شاه
- Born: Pakistan
- Citizenship: United States; Pakistan
- Education: London School of Economics
- Occupation: Fashion designer
- Known for: Élan and Zaha
- Father: Salman Shah

Khadijah Shah is a Pakistani American fashion designer and activist who is the founder and creative director of the fashion labels Élan and Zaha. Previously, she served as the creative director of Sapphire Retail from 2014 to 2017.

== Early life and education ==
Khadijah Shah was born to Salman Shah, a former caretaker finance minister of Pakistan, and Aneela Shah, a fashion designer. She was raised by her grandparents Asif Nawaz Janjua, who served as a Chief of Army Staff, and Nuzhat.

Shah completed her higher education in the United Kingdom and graduated with a bachelor's degree in international relations from the London School of Economics.
She later returned to Pakistan to pursue a career in fashion.

== Career ==
Shah chose fashion design as her career due to the influence of her mother. In 2004, she founded the fashion house Élan, named after her mother's nickname. It was initially focused on high-end bridal and couture wear. Élan later expanded to India as well.

In 2012, Shah formed a joint initiative with Hussain Mills to launch Élan Lawn. Two years later, in 2014, she became creative director at Sapphire Retail, a position she held until 2017, while continuing to manage Élan. After leaving Sapphire, she launched a separate fashion label, Zaha, in 2017.

In 2023, Shah was arrested in Lahore in connection with unrest and Corps Commander House attack.

== Personal life ==
Shah is married and has three children, two sons and a daughter. She holds dual citizenship.
