= Salman Shah (economist) =

Pakistani economist

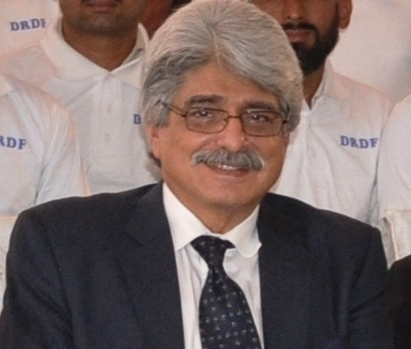

Caretaker Finance Minister of Pakistan
- In office 19 November 2007 – 25 March 2008
- President: Pervez Musharraf
- Prime Minister: Muhammad Mian Soomro (caretaker)
- Preceded by: Shaukat Aziz
- Succeeded by: Ishaq Dar

Advisor to the Prime Minister on Finance, Revenue, Economic Affairs and Statistics
- In office 5 September 2004 – 15 November 2007

Chairman of Privatization Commission of Pakistan
- In office 5 November 1996 – 17 February 1997
- Prime Minister: Malik Meraj Khalid (caretaker)

Personal details
- Born: October 1950 (age 75–76) Lahore, Punjab, Pakistan
- Children: Khadija Shah (daughter)
- Relatives: Asif Nawaz Janjua (father-in-law)
- Education: Indiana University Bloomington

Salman Shah (Urdu: سلمان شاہ) is a Pakistani economist who served as an Advisor to the Chief Minister of Punjab, Usman Buzdar, on Economic Affairs and Planning & Development. Previously, he has served as the caretaker Finance Minister of Pakistan. He has served as an advisor to Finance Minister Shaukat Aziz on finance, economic affairs, statistics and revenues.

== Personal life ==
He is the son-in-law of former Chief of Army Staff General Asif Nawaz Janjua. He has two sons and three daughters, including Khadijah Shah.

Political offices
Preceded by Shaukat Aziz	Finance Minister of Pakistan; 2007 – 2008	Succeeded by Ishaq Dar
