= Heavy Electrical Complex =

Power transformers manufacturing company in Haripur, Pakistan

Heavy Electrical Complex (HEC)
- Company type: Private
- Industry: Electrical engineering
- Headquarters: Haripur, Pakistan
- Key people: Mahmoud Haq (chairman)
- Products: Power transformers
- Production output: 3,000 MVA annually
- Owner: IMS Engineering (96.6%)
- Website: www.hec.net.pk

Heavy Electrical Complex (HEC) is a power transformer manufacturing facility located in Hattar Industrial Estate, Haripur, Pakistan. The facility has an annual production capacity of 3,000 MVA.

== History ==
=== Privatisation ===
In late 2023, the privatization of HEC was completed with the handing over of share certificates to the buyer, IMS Engineering. The buyer paid Rs 1.4 billion for a 96.6 percent stake in HEC and also assumed additional liabilities of Rs 752 million to Bank of Khyber.

=== Land transfer ===
The government handed over the vacant HEC land to the Strategic Plans Division (SPD). The Ministry of Industries and Production had asked the Economic Coordination Committee (ECC) to review its earlier decision to transfer HEC land to SPD and authorize it to proceed in this regard.

== See also ==
- Heavy Mechanical Complex
