= Seema Aziz =

Pakistani entrepreneur and a social activist

- Born: 1951 (age 74–75); Lahore
- Education: University of Punjab, Harvard Business School
- Occupations: Entrepreneur, business executive, social worker
- Notable work: Founder Sefam (Bareeze), CARE Foundation

Seema Aziz (born 1950, Lahore) is a Pakistani business woman and a social activist. She is the founder and managing director of Sefam (Bareeze) and the founder and chairperson of CARE Foundation, the country's largest educational non-profit organization. She is also member and a private sector member in the Punjab Board of Investment and Trade and on the global advisory board of Harvard Business school.

== Education ==
Seema completed her college studies from College of Home Economics. She studied BSc (Bachelors of Science) at University of Punjab; and then went on to get her L.L.B (Bachelors of Law) degree in 1987 from the same institute. She has also completed her Executive Educational Program at Harvard Business School, Boston, USA

== Career ==
She started her career when she and her brother co-founded Sefam (Bareeze), a high-end fashion retailer in 1985. Their goal was to create Pakistan's first high quality fabric. At the time, there was no Pakistani brand creating export quality fabric and that became the goal of Seema's startup. By the mid-1990s Bareeze grew into popularity became the first textile producer to export high-quality fabrics internationally. It became one of the most successful brands of Pakistan and soon had more than 460 stores in Pakistan. It also expanded to Middle east, North America, Europe and the UK. . Bareeze has since then expanded its chain with six new subcategories and operates with over 500 selling points worldwide.

Seema is also a board member of Sarena, a sister industry of Sefam.

Since 2011, she has served as Chairperson of TUSDEC (Technology Upgradation and Skill Development Company) and is on the governing body of TEVTA (Technical Education and Vocational Training Authority), and on the Boards for the Pakistan Fashion Design Council; Punjab Board of Investment and Trade, Mobilink Foundation and the Punjab Education Foundation.

In 2018, Seema Aziz was chosen as a member to be on the Council of Business Leaders formed by the Prime Minister of Pakistan, Imran Khan. The CBL is headed by the prime minister and is aimed to supervise implementation of decisions for exports and account deficit issues.

== Philanthropic work ==
Aziz is a well-known social activist and philanthropist. She founded the NGO, CARE Foundation Pakistan in 1988 as a non-profit, educational organization. The NGO aspires to provide quality education to the underprivileged children in Pakistan. She started this NGO in Lahore as a result of a destructive flood that hit Pakistan. She started off with building one school and has now CARE Foundation has grown to build 888 schools throughout Pakistan. Her NGO has currently 285,000 students enrolled in schools and is one of the largest educational NGOs in Pakistan. It currently has over 130,000 graduates and over 3,775 teachers. The organization also operate a scholarship program that supports students all over Pakistan. CARE has also started a dedicated Teacher Training Center (TTC).

Seema is also working with another educational NGO Tele Taleem, where she is on the advisory board.

== Awards and achievements ==
Due to her philanthropic efforts, Seema Aziz was named Philanthropist of the Year by Hello! Pakistan Magazine. Forbes also published an article on her life and achievements titled "Fashioning A New Future For Pakistan."

She also an award winner of Barclay's UK Woman of the Year Award in 2016. The award recognized her extraordinary efforts for contributing to education in Pakistan. According to the Women of the Year, "Seema’s extraordinary contribution to education in Pakistan, based on her belief that every child has a right to an education. She set up the CARE foundation after discovering many children in the countryside had no school to go. The charity has given hundreds of thousands of children a brighter future."
