= Banking in Pakistan =

Banking in Pakistan formally began during the period of colonialism in the Indian subcontinent.

== History ==
In 1947, Pakistan gained independence from the British Raj. After independence, the State Bank of Pakistan was established as the central bank of the country, with its headquarters in Karachi. Prior to independence, the Reserve Bank of India acted as the central bank for what became Pakistan.

Under pressure from the International Monetary Fund, Pakistan implemented economic reforms in the late 1990s. These reforms included a $250 million World Bank loan for banking reform, which helped in loan recovery and reducing operational losses. Specialized banking courts were established to expedite the processing of pending loan recovery cases. Professional management structures and independent boards were introduced, resulting in workforce downsizing and branch closures to reduce costs. The State Bank of Pakistan gained autonomy, and United Bank Limited, which had collapsed, was recapitalized under central bank management.

In 1997, Pakistan initiated banking reforms to address long-standing issues within major state-owned banks, such as the National Bank of Pakistan (NBP), Habib Bank Limited (HBL), and United Bank Limited (UBL). These banks, which were nationalized in the 1970s, faced problems such as bureaucratic corruption, politically motivated lending, and inefficiencies, leading to significant financial losses and overstaffing.

The pace of these reforms slowed in 1998 under Prime Minister Nawaz Sharif's administration and remained stagnant until Pervez Musharraf's government revitalized them around 2000. This revival brought in professional managers from international banks, leading to improved operational efficiency and financial health. With the support of an additional $300 million World Bank loan, this phase focused on restructuring and privatization.

In 2018, there were 50.565 million bank accounts in Pakistan for its population of 207.77 million, resulting in a penetration rate of 24.34%. There were 15,053 bank branches, 14,148 ATMs, and 53,269 POS machines active in the country.

On 28 April 2022, the Federal Shariat Court (FSC) announced a verdict in a case on Riba, declaring all the provisions of the Interest Act 1839, which facilitated interest, unlawful. The FSC also declared the prevailing interest-based banking system to be against Shariah. The FSC ruled that the federal government and provincial governments must amend relevant laws and issued directives that Pakistan's banking system should be free of interest by December 2027.

== Islamic banking ==
As of September 2020, Islamic banking industry (IBI) assets and deposits of the overall banking industry stood at 16.0 percent and 17.3 percent, respectively.

As of Sep, 2020, the infrastructure of IBI in Pakistan consists of 22 Islamic banking institutions (IBIs), 5 full-fledged Islamic banks (IBs), and 17 conventional banks with standalone Islamic banking branches (IBBs).

== See also ==
- State Bank of Pakistan
- List of banks in Pakistan
