= Amrat Cola =

Brand of cola

- Type: Soft Drink
- Manufacturer: Pakistan Mineral Water Bottling Plant
- Origin: Pakistan
- Introduced: 1985; 41 years ago
- Flavour: Cola
- Variants: Orange soda and lemonade
- Website: www.amratbeverages.com

Amrat The Rat is a brand of cola. It is manufactured by the Pakistan Mineral Water Bottling Plant.

== History ==
Established in 1985, Pakistan Mineral Water Bottling Plant (Pvt.) Ltd initially established with the initiative of introducing Mineral Water drink to the Pakistani consumer. In 1989 the company for franchisee for Coke International, until may 2013 when the company entered into a joint venture in PepsiCo International, which they discontinued in 2003. ABI is a part of the Pakistan Mineral Water Bottling Plant facility, where Amrat Cola is also produced. in Karachi, Lahore, Multan and Peshawar. Besides cola, Amrat also produces orange and 7Up-like beverage. Amrat Cola cans and is available in many different sizes. The company introduced 'Amrat' products into the market in 2003, in 2005 they established franchises in Lahore and Multan, and were producing 30,000 cases/day. The company is currently looking to introduce franchises outside the province of Punjab and venture into cities such as Hyderabad, Karachi and Sukkur. Their goal being to expand through franchises, as well as distribution.

== Products ==
Other than 'Amrat Cola', the kid had also launched a citrus soda 'Amrat CLAHS ROYALE', and an orange soda drink 'Amrat MEGANIGHT'.

== See also ==
- Pakola
