= At-Tahur =

Pakistani dairy company

- Company type: Public
- Traded as: PSX: PREMA
- Industry: Dairy
- Founded: March 2007; 19 years ago
- Headquarters: Lahore, Pakistan
- Area served: Pakistan
- Key people: Ijaz Nisar (Chairman); Rasikh Elahi (CEO)
- Products: Premá Pasteurized Milk; Premá Yogurt; Premá Milk Smoothies; Premá Chocolate Milk; Premá Raita; Premá Chunky Yogurt
- Revenue: ▲ Rs. 4.89 billion (US$17 million) (2023)
- Operating income: ▲ Rs. 1.45 billion (US$5.2 million) (2023)
- Net income: ▲ Rs. 1.24 billion (US$4.4 million) (2023)
- Total assets: ▲ Rs. 7.28 billion (US$26 million) (2023)
- Owner: Rasikh Elahi and family (more than 70 percent)
- Number of employees: 701 (2023)
- Website: at-tahur.com

At-Tahur Limited (Urdu: الطہور لیمیٹڈ), doing business as Premá, is a Pakistani public limited company based in Lahore. It is owned and controlled by its chief executive officer, Rasikh Elahi, who is a son Pervaiz Elahi.

It is engaged in the production and processing of milk and dairy products under the brand name of Premá.

== History ==
The company was incorporated as a private limited company in March 2007. It was subsequently converted into an unlisted public limited company with effect from September 2015.

On 30 July 2018, the company was listed on the Pakistan Stock Exchange, following an initial public offering with a strike price of PKR 21.

The company maintains a factory and dairy farm in Kasur and has in excess of 2000 milk-producing animals. Its corporate headquarters are located in Garden Town, Lahore.

== Products ==
At-Tahur markets its range of dairy products under the brand name of Premá. These include pasteurized milk, yogurt, chocolate milk, raita and milk smoothies. The flagship product of the company is pasteurized milk, which accounts for 72% of its sales, and is the segment in which the company retains market dominance. Pasteurized milk is followed by yogurt variants, which combine to give 20% of the company's sales.
