= Lotte Kolson =

Pakistani food company

- Formerly: K. S. Sulemanji Esmailji and Sons
- Type: Private
- Industry: Snack
- Founded: 1942; 84 years ago
- Headquarters: Karachi, Pakistan,
- Area served: Pakistan
- Key people: Khayyam Rajpoot (CEO)
- Products: Snacks; Pasta; Biscuits; Cakes; Chewing gum Instant noodles
- Brands: Slanty, Bravo, Potato Sticks, Jam Hearts, Snackers, Cheese Balls, Kai, Choco Pie, Spout
- Revenue: ▲ Rs. 13.538 billion (US$48 million) (2024)
- Operating income: ▼ Rs. −169 million (US$−600,000) (2024)
- Net income: ▲ Rs. −536 million (US$−1.9 million) (2024)
- Total assets: ▼ Rs. 16.182 billion (US$58 million) (2024)
- Total equity: ▼ Rs. 9.751 billion (US$35 million) (2024)
- Parent: Lotte Corporation
- Website: lottekolson.com
- Footnotes; Financials as of 31 December 2024

Lotte Kolson, formerly known as K. S. Sulemanji Esmailji and Sons, is a Pakistani food and confectionery manufacturing company headquartered in Karachi. It is a subsidiary of the South Korean conglomerate Lotte Group, operating through Lotte Wellfood (formerly Lotte Confectionery), and produces snacks, biscuits, pasta, cakes, chewing gum and instant noodles under the Kolson brand.

== History ==
Lotte Kolson was founded in 1942 in Karachi as a family business selling vermicelli and was the first manufacturer of pasta in Pakistan. It was formally incorporated as a private limited company under the name K. S. Sulemanji Esmailji and Sons in March 1975. Operating under the Kolson brand, the company manufactured pasta, biscuits, chips, cereals, and snacks.

In October 2010, Lotte Confectionery acquired a 69.45% controlling stake in K. S. Sulemanji Esmailji and Sons for 20 billion won (about US$17.9 million). The transaction completed in January 2011, and by 2014 the South Korean parent had taken full ownership of the company, which was subsequently rebranded as Lotte Kolson.

In September 2017, the Punjab Food Authority (PFA) issued a notice against certain coloured snack products described as "slanty", which the authority deemed unhealthy and unregulated. Lotte Kolson issued a clarification stating that the action involved a case of "mistaken identity" between its licensed Slanty brand and unregulated imitation coloured snacks (paapar) sold in the market, and that it stood behind the PFA's commitment to combat unhealthy and unregulated snacks.

In April 2018, Lotte Kolson inaugurated a factory built on 20 acres in Phoolnagar along Multan Road, Kasur District, Punjab.

In July 2024, the Sindh Food Authority (SFA) ordered Lotte Kolson to immediately recall 11 of its packaged snack products from the market after laboratory testing at the Food Testing Laboratory of the University of Karachi's Department of Food Science and Technology declared them unfit for human consumption. The products covered by the recall were Slanty Vegetable, Snackers Hot Masala, Snackers Pizza, Twitch Classic, Potato Sticks, Cheese Ball Masala, Cheese Balls Cheese, Kai Korean Hot, Kai Spicy Mala, Kai Mala Wok, and Kai Korean Kimchi. The samples had been submitted by Lotte Kolson roughly two-and-a-half months earlier as part of an application for the registration of 24 products. Acting under Section 24 of the Sindh Food Authority Act 2016, SFA issued a directive requiring the company to withdraw the affected items within three days, cease their production and sale with immediate effect, and submit details of available stock to the authority. The order warned that legal action under the Act and the Pakistan Penal Code would follow non-compliance, while also providing the company a one-week window to appeal the decision before the SFA Board.

== Operations ==
Lotte Kolson is headquartered at the F. B. Industrial Area in Karachi and operates multiple production facilities across Karachi, Lahore and the Islamabad region. Its brands include Slanty pellet snacks, Bravo biscuits, Potato Sticks, Jam Hearts biscuits, Snackers, Cheese Balls, Kai ramen-style instant noodles, the locally produced Choco Pie, and the Spout chewing gum brand.
