= PICIC Commercial Bank =

Pakistani bank

- Formerly: Schön Bank Limited Gulf Commercial Bank Limited
- Type: Private
- Industry: Banking
- Founded: Karachi, 1993 (as Schön Bank Limited)
- Defunct: 2007
- Fate: Merged with NIB Bank now MCB Bank
- Headquarters: Karachi, Pakistan
- Products: Loans; Credit Cards; Savings; Consumer Banking
- Website: www.picicbank.com.pk

PICIC Commercial Bank Limited was a Pakistani bank based in Karachi, Pakistan.

Pakistan Industrial Credit and Investment Corporation (PICIC) acquired it as Gulf Commercial Bank Limited in early 2001. The bank was renamed as PICIC Commercial Bank Limited.

In 2007, the bank and its operations were merged into NIB Bank.

== History ==
PICIC Commercial Bank Limited was incorporated in 1993 as Schön Bank Limited and commenced its business on 4 April 1994, with a paid-up capital of PKR 500 million.

In 1997, Al Ahlia Portfolio Securities Company, Sultanate of Oman acquired the major shareholding and changed the bank’s name to Gulf Commercial Bank Limited. In February 2001, the bank’s management again changed when Pakistan Industrial Credit and Investment Corporation acquired 60% controlling shares from Al-Ahlia and changed its name to PICIC Commercial Bank in May 2001.

At the time of takeover by PICIC in February 2001, the bank had only 15 branches. It was the 6th largest bank in the country at one time. On December 31, 2007, PICIC Commercial Bank was merged into NIB Bank.

== Functions ==
=== Services ===
- Commercial Financing
- Home Financing
- Car Financing
- industrial financing
- Home Financing
- Telebanking
- Mobile Banking
- Motorcycle Financing
- Islamic Banking
- Deposit & Saving Products

=== Internet banking ===
As technology advanced, PICIC Commercial Bank was set to use it and make the best of it. They introduced for its customers, Online Banking solutions. With that customers could access their accounts for deposits, withdrawals or inquiries from any branch nationwide.

== Branches ==
PICIC had over 120 branches in over 42 cities including the main cities and towns of Pakistan.
