= Ittefaq Iron Industries =

- Trade name: Ittefaq Iron Industries
- Company type: Public
- Traded as: PSX: ITTEFAQ
- Industry: Steel
- Founded: 2009; 17 years ago
- Founder: Mian Muhammad Shafi
- Headquarters: Lahore, Pakistan
- Area served: Pakistan
- Website: www.ittefaqsteel.com

Ittefaq Iron Industries (Urdu: اتفاق آئرن انڈسٹریز) is a Pakistani steel manufacturer based in Lahore, Pakistan.

== History ==
Ittefaq Iron Industries Limited was founded in 2004 by the Alshafi Group, which originated from Ittefaq Foundries. In the early 1990s, the group separated from Ittefaq Foundries and inherited Ittefaq Sugar and Brother Steel. Later, it established several companies, such as Kashmir Sugar Mills, Kashmir Feeds, Ittefaq Bio Tech, and Kashmir Poultry Breeders. It is also a trustee of the Ittefaq Hospital.

In 2004, Ittefaq Sons was incorporated to produce steel bars. The company expanded in 2008 with an additional induction furnace, incorporated as Alshafi Steel. A year later, Alshafi Steel merged with Ittefaq Sons, forming Ittefaq Iron Industries Limited in 2009.

In 2017, Ittefaq Iron Industries raised Rs. 1.26 billion through initial public offering at a strike price of Rs. 30.2 and became a listed company on the Pakistan Stock Exchange.
