= Generation companies (Pakistan) =

Power generation companies in Pakistan

Generation companies (GENCOs) are companies responsible for power generation in Pakistan. They are part of Pakistan Electric Power Company and operate independently.

== List of GENCOs ==
There are currently four GENCOs which are operated by WAPDA in Pakistan. They are:

- Jamshoro Power Company Limited, GENCO-I
- Central Power Generation Company Limited, GENCO-II
- Northern Power Generation Company Limited, GENCO-III
- Lakhra Power Generation Company Limited, GENCO-IV
