= Bykea =

Ride hailing and Parcel delivery Company

- Native name: بائیکیا
- Type: Private
- Industry: Gig work
- Founded: 2016; 10 years ago
- Founder: Muneeb Maayr
- Headquarters: Karachi, Pakistan
- Area served: Pakistan
- Key people: Muneeb Maayr (CEO); Abdul Mannan (CIO)
- Products: Android and IOS apps
- Website: www.bykea.com

Bykea, stylised as BYKEA, is a Pakistani ride-hailing service and parcel delivery company based in Karachi. It was founded by Muneeb Maayr in 2016.

== History ==
Bykea was started in December 2016 in Karachi, Pakistan. The company currently operates in four Pakistani cities: Karachi, Lahore, Islamabad, and Rawalpindi.

In 2018, Bykea partnered with Jazz, a Pakistan-based digital communications company. In 2018, Bykea and MJSF (Mahvash and Jahangir Siddiqui Foundation) joined for the Bikers Support Scheme.

In 2019, Bykea raised $5.7 million in series A funding from local and international institutions.

During the COVID-19 pandemic in Pakistan, Bykea had secured a $13 million investment. However, due to the government's ban on pillion riding to combat the virus, investors reneged on the deal.

In 2021, Bykea raised $10 million from investors to support the expansion of its transportation and logistics services.

== Services ==
Bykea enables a crowdsourced network of motorbike owners to transport people, parcels, on-demand shopping, and payments within a city.

In early 2022, Bykea added rickshaws to its services. By mid-2022, the company began offering both air-conditioned and non-air-conditioned options in its ride-hailing service.

== See also ==
- Platform economy
- Vehicle for hire
- List of gig economy companies
