= Pak Datacom =

Pakistani Telecommunication and IT Company

- Company type: Public
- Traded as: PSX: PAKD
- Industry: Telecommunications
- Founded: 1992; 34 years ago
- Headquarters: Islamabad, Pakistan
- Area served: Pakistan
- Key people: Syed Zomma Mohiuddin (Chairman); Syed Zulfiqar Ali (CEO)
- Revenue: ▲Rs. 1.362 billion (US$4.7 million) (2023)
- Operating income: ▲ Rs. 399.13 million (US$1.4 million) (2023)
- Net income: ▲ Rs. 289.86 million (US$1.0 million) (2023)
- Total assets: ▲ Rs. 2.05 billion (US$7.1 million) (2023)
- Number of employees: 193 (2023)
- Parent: Telecom Foundation (55.08%)
- Website: pakdatacom.com.pk

Pak Datacom is a Pakistani company which provides telecommunication and IT services.

It is listed on the Pakistan Stock Exchange.

== History ==
The company was incorporated as a private limited company in July 1992 but later converted into a public limited company in June 1994.

In 2012, Pak Datacom's CEO, Salman Elahi Malik, was removed from the office for corruption.

== Ownership ==
The Telecom Foundation owns 55% shares which works under the Ministry of Information Technology. While other 45% is owned by foreign and private investors.
