= Sapphire (group) =

Pakistani textile company

- Type: Public
- Traded as: PSX: SAPT
- Industry: Textile
- Founded: 1940 in Calcutta, India
- Founder: Haji Muhammad Din
- Headquarters: Lahore, Pakistan
- Key people: Nadeem Abdullah (CEO)
- Products: Textiles and textile products
- Net income: ▲ Rs. 13.263 billion (US$47 million) (2024)
- Total equity: ▲ Rs. 63.487 billion (US$230 million) (2024)
- Number of employees: 10,044 (2024)
- Subsidiaries: Sapphire Retail; Sapphire Real Estate Limited; Sapphire Green Energy Limited; Sapphire Chemicals Limited; Sapphire International APS; Sapphire Wind Power Company (70%); Tricon Boston Consulting Corporation Limited (57.125%)
- Website: sapphire.com.pk
- Footnotes; Financials as of 30 June 2024

Sapphire Textile Mills Limited, also known as Sapphire Group, is a Pakistani vertically integrated textile manufacturer, producing cotton yarn, fabric, and finished garments. It is based in Lahore, Pakistan.

== History ==
Sapphire's origins go back to a leather business founded by Haji Muhammad Din in Dhaka. Haji Muhammad Din was born in Chiniot to a family of farmers, but due to economic hardship, the family transitioned from farming to the leather trade. He started with limited resources and expanded his business to Calcutta and Chittagong, involving his four sons in the growing enterprise. Under Haji Muhammad Din's leadership, the business flourished and became one of the largest exporters of raw leather in British India, with agents in major cities such as New Delhi, Lucknow, Kanpur, and Amritsar.

After the partition of India in 1947 and the family moved to Dhaka. In 1951, Haji Muhammad Din died after a brief illness and the family struggled to manage the labor-intensive leather business and eventually transitioned to trading yarn between Dhaka and Karachi in 1953.

By the early 1960s, the family had established a stable yarn business and opened their first textile mill in Jessore, East Pakistan, in 1961. As Bengali nationalism grew, the family decided to invest in West Pakistan and established a spinning mill in Bahawalpur in 1966. Political instability in East Pakistan led the family to move to Karachi in 1970, where they acquired the Sapphire Textile Mill in Kotri, Sindh, in 1971, and later used it as the group identity.

In 2003, Sapphire made an equity investment of Rs300 million in the unlisted associated company, Sapphire Finishing Mills Limited.

In 2009, Sapphire invested 980,000 Danish krone in Beirholms Sapphire A/S, a company registered in Denmark.

In 2014, the retail division of the company, Sapphire Retail, was founded by Nabeel Abdullah. Sapphire's retail sector began as a women's apparel brand but quickly grew into a lifestyle brand with products ranging from cosmetics, menswear, children's garments, accessories and linen.

Sapphire has also diversified into the power generation and dairy sectors. Sapphire Dairies operates a mechanized dairy farm based on 100 acres near Manga, Lahore, and Sapphire Electric Company has a combined cycle plant in Muridke.

== Production plants ==
Sapphire operates three spinning production plants, located in Kotri, Nooriabad, and Kasur; one weaving plant in Sheikhupura; and one stitching plant in Sheikhupura.

== Subsidiaries in Textile ==
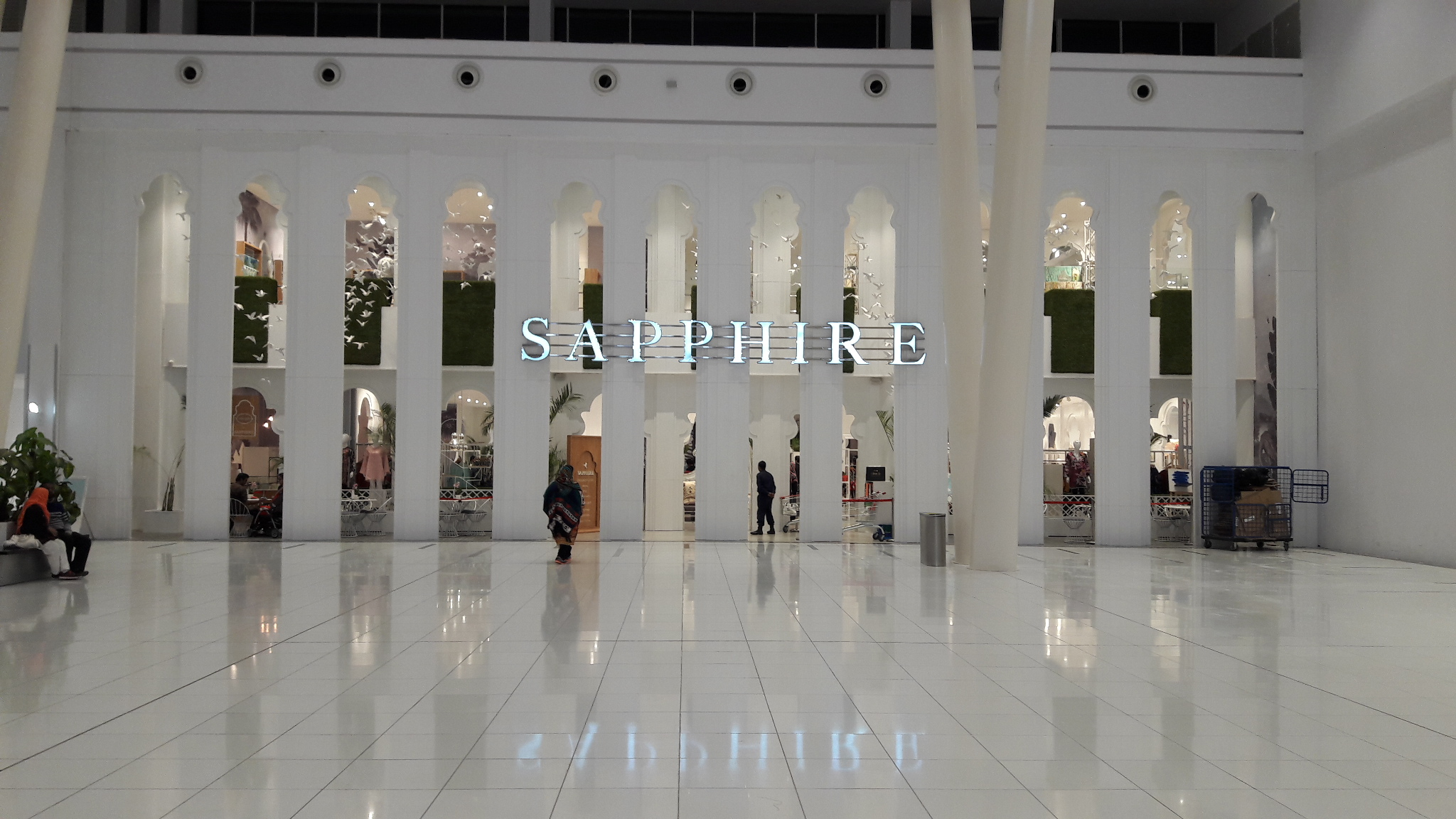
Sapphire outlet at Packages Mall

Below are the projects of sapphire group in the textile sector

- Sapphire Retail is a subsidiary of Sapphire Textile and is based in Lahore.
- Sapphire Retail was founded in 2014. It opened its first store in The Broadway, Bradford in 2024.
- Sapphire Textile Mills Ltd
- Sapphire Fibers Ltd
- Sapphire Finishing Mills Ltd
- Diamond Fabrics Ltd
- Reliance Cotton Spinning mills Ltd
- Amer Cotton Mills Pvt Ltd
- Reliance Textile Mills Ltd

== Investments ==
- Sapphire Dairies (12.95%)
- Sapphire Power Generation Limited (26.43%)
- Sapphire Wind Power
