= Sindh Bank =

Bank of Pakistan

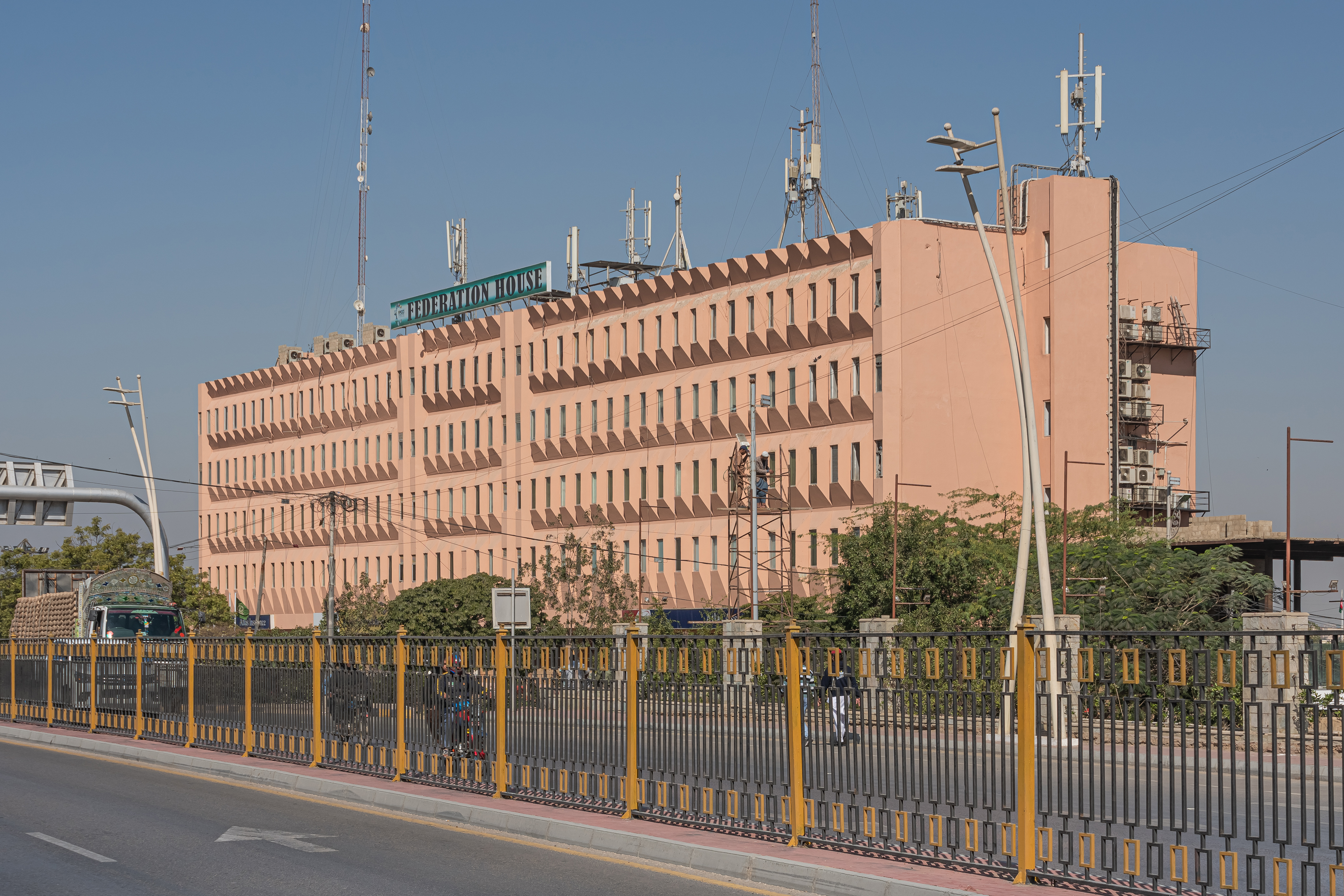
- Headquarters of Sindh Bank are on the 3rd floor of Federation House
- Company type: Unlisted public company
- Industry: Banking
- Founded: 2010; 16 years ago
- Headquarters: Karachi-75600, Pakistan
- Number of locations: 330
- Area served: Pakistan
- Products: Loans, savings, and consumer Banking
- Subsidiaries: Sindh Microfinance Bank
- Website: sindhbank.com.pk

The Sindh Bank Limited (Urdu pronunciation: [sɪndʱ bɛŋk] sind-BANK) is a Pakistani provincial government-owned bank headquartered in Karachi. It has over 331 branches in 169 cities.

== History ==
Sindh Bank Limited was established on 29 October 2010 with seed capital of Rs.10 billion, wholly subscribed by the Government of Sindh.

It commenced full-scale banking business in April 2011, and has established 331 on-line branches spread across 169 towns and cities of Pakistan. Out of these, 14 branches are dedicated to Islamic Banking.

Sindh Bank launched its new website of 1 June 2020.

== See also ==
- List of Banks in Pakistan
