= Pakistan International Container Terminal =

Business project at Karachi port

- Company type: Public
- Traded as: PSX: PICT
- Founded: June 2002; 23 years ago in Karachi, Pakistan
- Headquarters: Karachi, Pakistan
- Area served: Pakistan
- Products: Container terminal services
- Services: Container handling Stevedoring; Cargo logistics
- Parent: International Container Terminal Services (via ICTSI Mauritius Limited)
- Website: pict.com.pk

Pakistan International Container Terminal (PICT) was a Pakistani container terminal operator that managed berths 6 to 9 on the East Wharf of the Port of Karachi under a 21-year build–operate–transfer (BOT) concession with the Karachi Port Trust (KPT) from 2002 to 2023. From 2012 to 2023, PICT operated as a subsidiary of ICTSI Mauritius Limited, part of the Philippines-based International Container Terminal Services (ICTSI) group.

== History ==
=== 2002–2012: Early history ===
Pakistan International Container Terminal (PICT) was incorporated as a private limited company in June 2002 by Premier Mercantile Services (PMS), a Karachi-based stevedoring and logistics firm operating since 1964, in a joint venture with the Port of Hamburg. In June 2002, PMS entered into an Implementation Agreement with the Karachi Port Trust to design, construct, operate and transfer a modern container terminal at berths 6 to 9 of the East Wharf, Karachi Port, for a period of 21 years commencing 18 June 2002. The project commenced commercial operations in August 2002, within six weeks of taking over the site from KPT, initially using PMS's existing container-handling equipment. The total cost of the project was estimated at approximately US$75 million, of which US$9.25 million was financed by the International Finance Corporation (IFC). The funds were used to acquire container handling equipment and quay cranes.

In 2003, PICT was listed on the Karachi Stock Exchange, following an initial public offering. In March 2004, the first phase of the terminal was completed at a cost of $30 million.

=== 2012–2023: Acquistion, growth, and end of concession ===
In March 2012, the Philippines-based International Container Terminal Services (ICTSI), owned by Enrique K. Razon Jr., disclosed its intention to acquire between 35% and 55% of PICT through its subsidiary ICTSI Mauritius Limited. On 30 March 2012, ICTSI Mauritius signed a share purchase agreement with majority shareholders, including the HS Group and JS Co, to acquire a 35% stake at Rs. 150 per share, valuing the deal at approximately Rs.5.73 billion (US$63 million). As of 2012, it has a maximum handling capacity of 750,000 TEUs.

In December 2021, PICT filed a petition in the Sindh High Court in an attempt to prevent KPT from terminating the concession agreement or inviting bids for a new contract, arguing that as the incumbent operator it was entitled to a right of first refusal in line with global practice. The petition was rejected by the court in March 2023.

In June 2023, the Cabinet Committee on Inter-Governmental Commercial Transactions endorsed the Ministry of Maritime Affairs decision to hand the terminal back to KPT after the expiry of the concession on 17 June 2023. The concession agreement expired on 17 June 2023 and the premises were taken over by KPT on 18 June 2023. On 22 June 2023, KPT signed a separate 50-year concession agreement with the UAE-government-owned AD Ports Group for the operation of the same berths 6 to 9, through a joint venture with Kaheel Terminals named Karachi Gateway Terminal Limited (KGTL).

== Operations ==
During the period of its concession, PICT operated a modern container terminal at berths 6 to 9 of the East Wharf of Karachi Port, with a 600-metre quay wall, a design depth of 13.5 metres and a backup area of approximately 21 hectares. The terminal was equipped with ship-to-shore cranes, rubber-tyred gantry cranes and reach stackers, and reportedly handled around 600,000 containers a year at its peak, with a maximum handling capacity of 750,000 TEUs. It also installed Pakistan's first dedicated rail cargo service connecting Karachi and Lahore, operated in cooperation with Pakistan Railways.

PICT held a BOT contract with the Karachi Port Trust for the exclusive construction, development, operation and management of a common-user container terminal at Karachi Port for a period of 21 years commencing 18 June 2002, which expired on 17 June 2023. Since the expiry of the concession, the terminal has been operated by Karachi Gateway Terminal Limited under the AD Ports Group joint venture.
