= Lakhra Power Plant =

- Country: Pakistan
- Location: Khanot, Jamshoro District, Sindh
- Coordinates: 25°42′18″N 68°17′10″E
- Status: Out of service
- Construction began: 1985
- Commission date: 1995
- Owner: Water and Power Development Authority (through Lakhra Power Generation Company Limited)
- Operator: Lakhra Power Generation Company Limited

Power generation
- Units operational: 3 × 50 MW
- Nameplate capacity: 150 MW

Lakhra Power Plant (also known as Lakhra Power Generation Company Limited or GENCO‑IV) is a 150‑megawatt lignite‑fired thermal power station located near the village of Khanot in Jamshoro District, Sindh, Pakistan. It was commissioned in 1995 and uses indigenous coal from the adjacent Lakhra coalfield as the fuel.

== History ==
Exploratory drilling during the 1960s confirmed sizeable lignite reserves at Lakhra, prompting proposals for a mine‑mouth power station. A series of feasibility studies by United States and Japanese aid agencies between 1967 and 1988 recommended a fluidised bed design capable of handling the coal's high moisture and sulphur content. The Water and Power Development Authority (WAPDA) prepared the project’s PC‑1 in 1985, and China’s state‑owned Dongfang Electric extended supplier credit that same year. Equipment and construction contracts were signed in August 1989 and February 1990 respectively.

Three circulating fluidised bed units, each rated at 50 MW, entered commercial operation on 6 June 1995, 14 October 1995 and 3 January 1996. The boilers were built under licence from Foster Wheeler, while turbines and generators were supplied by Dongfang.

An energy and exergy audit of Unit 2 published in 2021 reported condenser losses of 68 percent and an overall exergy efficiency of 17.6 percent under off‑design conditions, well below the nominal benchmark of 26 percent.

In March 2023, the Senate of Pakistan’s Standing Committee on Power heard that many employees had gone unpaid or been redeployed after the government classified the plant as “high‑cost and low‑efficiency.”

== Financing and ownership ==
Initial capital expenditures were met chiefly through Dongfang’s export seller credit, complemented by federal development funds for site infrastructure and grid interconnection. The station was corporatised in 2001 as Lakhra Power Generation Company Limited (LPGCL), one of four state‑owned generation companies. A 20‑year lease concluded in 2006 with Associated Power Generation Company to run the complex was annulled by the Supreme Court of Pakistan in 2013 for lack of transparency.

== Environmental concerns ==
Lakhra lignite contains 9–38 percent ash and up to 14 percent sulphur, with gross calorific values between 5,500 and 9,100 BTU lb^{−1}. These characteristics necessitate limestone injection and particulate control, both of which have historically under‑performed, generating visible emissions and local air‑quality complaints.
