= National Credit Guarantee Company =

Pakistani financial company

Coordinates: 33.733598°N 73.088952°E

National Credit Guarantee Company Limited
- Type: Public-private venture
- Incorporated: 18 March 2022
- Headquarters: Islamabad, Pakistan
- Key people: Kashif Umar Thanvi (Chairman); Ammar Habib Khan (CEO)
- Owner: Karandaaz Pakistan (56%); Ministry of Finance (44%)
- Rating: AAA (by PACRA)
- Website: ncgcl.pk

The National Credit Guarantee Company Limited (NCGCL) is a Pakistani financial company that issues credit guarantees to small and medium enterprises (SMEs) in Pakistan, bolstering financial accessibility and allowing them to borrow money from banks and non-bank financial institutions. It was launched on 12 January 2024 as a collaborative public-private venture by the Ministry of Finance and Karandaaz Pakistan, funded by the United Kingdom's Foreign, Commonwealth and Development Office under its Financial Inclusion Program. It is the first special credit guarantee company in Pakistan for SMEs.

On 27 June 2022, the NCGCL agreed to provide Rs. 10 billion of green financing in a deal with the Ministry of Climate Change.
