= Masood Textile Mills =

Textile Company

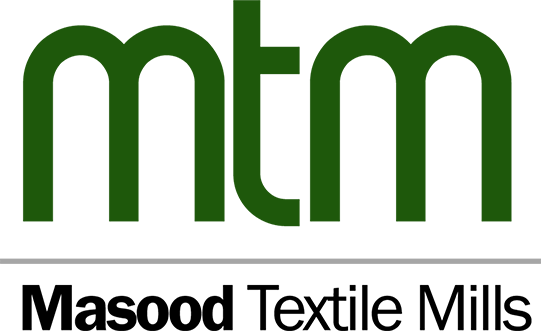
- Type: Public
- Traded as: PSX: MSOT
- Industry: Textile
- Founded: 1984
- Headquarters: Faisalabad, Pakistan
- Key people: Kohistan Group
- Products: Textiles (Knitwear)
- Number of employees: 24,000
- Parent: Shandong Ruyi Technology Group
- Website: masoodtextile.com

Masood Textile Mills (MTM) (Urdu: مسعود ٹیکسٹائل ملز) is a Pakistani textile manufacturing company based in Faisalabad. It operates as an enterprise with facilities for spinning (yarn), knitting, fabric dyeing, processing, laundry, and apparel manufacturing. MTM specializes in a diverse range of textile and apparel products, including knitwear, sportswear, sleepwear, denim apparel, special yarns, knitwear fabric, and items designed for special applications. It is publicly listed on the Pakistan Stock Exchange.

== History ==
Masood Textile Mills was founded in 1984. In 2014 it posted a pre-tax profit of Rs 1.1 billion, which was 13% higher than its pre-tax earnings in the preceding year. Shanghai Challenge Textile Company acquired 24.3% shares in Masood Textile Mills in a privately negotiated deal. It later acquired 52% stake of the company. They are the official partners.

It used to be the largest knit-wear manufacturer and exporter in Pakistan before 2020.

== Governance Body ==
Their governance body has seven directors, two of whom are from their partner Shanghai Challenge Textile Co Ltd.

== Notes ==
Ahmad, Mansoor (August 6, 2024). "Changing Bangladesh situation worries Pakistani investors in textile sector". www.thenews.com.pk.
