= PHA training =

Form of bodybuilding circuit training

PHA training or peripheral heart action training is a form of bodybuilding circuit training that was popularized by former AAU Mr. America and Mr. Universe Bob Gajda in the 1960s. The smaller muscles around the heart are worked on first before the larger muscles around the body's periphery.

The technique requires the exerciser to continuously exercise over a long period of time with no breaks. It is typically performed using multi-muscle exercises such as squats, pulls and presses and follow a specific strategy so that no one muscle is covered in two corresponding exercises.

A common approach with PHA training is to alternate from upper body to lower body and back again. This is different from many other circuit-style approaches.

A 2015 study found that after 30 training sessions performed in three months, PHA resistance exercise promoted cardiovascular adaptations, with a decrease in the power spectral component of vascular sympathetic activity and an increase in the vagal modulation. Low-frequency oscillation estimated from systolic blood pressure variability seems to be a suitable index of the sympathetic modulation of vasomotor activity. This investigation also want to emphasize the beneficial effects of this particular resistance exercise training, considering also that the increase in muscular strength is inversely associated with all-cause mortality and the prevalence of metabolic syndrome, independent of cardiorespiratory fitness levels.
