= Ismail Industries Limited =

Pakistani foods company

- Type: Public
- Traded as: PSX: ISIL
- Industry: Confectionery
- Founded: 1988; 38 years ago
- Founders: Muhammad M. Ismail; Maqsood Ismail
- Headquarters: Karachi, Pakistan
- Area served: Pakistan and other countries
- Key people: Maqsood Ismail (CEO)
- Products: Confectionery (candies); Snack food
- Revenue: ▲ Rs. 131.335 billion (US$470 million) (2024)
- Operating income: ▲ Rs. 13.429 billion (US$48 million) (2024)
- Net income: ▼ Rs. 4.907 billion (US$18 million) (2024)
- Total assets: ▲ Rs. 104.927 billion (US$380 million) (2024)
- Total equity: ▲ Rs. 22.661 billion (US$81 million) (2024)
- Owner: Miftah Ismail (31.03%); Almas Maqsood (29.83%); Muhammad M. Ismail (15.72%); Ahmed Muhammad (15.22%)
- Number of employees: 3,362 (2024)
- Subsidiaries: Bisconni; Candyland; SnackCity; Astro Films; Bank of Khyber (24%); Hudson Pharmaceuticals (78%)
- Website: ismailindustries.com.pk
- Footnotes; Financials as of 30 June 2024

Ismail Industries Limited (Urdu: اسماعیل انڈسٹریز لمٹیڈ), also known as Ismail Group, is a Pakistani confectionery and snack food manufacturer headquartered in Karachi, Pakistan. It owns AstroPack, CandyLand, Bisconni and SnackCity brands.

== History ==
Ismail Industries' history goes back to a confectionery factory founded by Haji Ahmad Chandia in Sukkur during the 1960s. The business was unsuccessful, so the factory was closed in 1964. Later, Chandia founded another confectionery business with his four sons called Union Biscuit Private Limited in Karachi. The business was successful, but began to decline with the death of the heir apparent, Ismail. Following his death, the family reestablished the company as Ismail Industries Limited in 1988. The company was listed on the Karachi Stock Exchange in 1989. Miftah Ismail, former Finance Minister of Pakistan, joined his family business in 1994 after completing his education in the U.S.

In 1990, Ismail Industries established its first subsidiary, Candyland, which introduced soft jellies such as Chilli Milli in Pakistan. Candyland is also known for producing Fanty, Super Twister, and Paradise.

In 2002, Ismail Industries founded Bisconni which later became known for its Cocomo biscuit. Bisconni is also known for launching Rite cookies.

In 2006, SnackCity was launched to make snack foods in Pakistan. SnackCity is known for producing Kurleez, a line of crisp snacks.

In 2013, Ismail Industries acquired 24.5 percent stake in the Bank of Khyber.

In 2021, Ismail Industries established a polyester resin (PET resin) manufacturing plant with an annual production capacity of 108,000 tons.

== Subsidiaries ==
- Bisconni
- Candyland
- SnackCity
- Astro Films
- Hudson Pharmaceuticals (78%)

== Investments ==
- 30 MW ACT Wind Power Project (33%)
- Bank of Khyber (24%)
- 50 MW ACT II Din Wind Power Project (17%)

== Brands ==
- Chilli Milli
- Cocomo
- Fanty
- Kurleez
- Now
- Paradise
- Rite
- Super Twister

== Factories ==
Ismail Industries operates three factories in the following cities:

- Hub, Balochistan
- Lahore
- Karachi
