= NIB Bank =

Pakistani bank

- Company type: Public Limited Company
- Traded as: KSE: NIB
- Industry: Banking; Capital Markets
- Founded: October 2003; 22 years ago
- Defunct: July 2017
- Fate: Merged with MCB Bank in 2017
- Successor: MCB Bank
- Headquarters: PNSC Building, Karachi, Pakistan
- Key people: Teo Cheng San, Roland (Chairman); Yameen karai (President and CEO)
- Products: Deposits; consumer loans; wealth management; trade finance; working capital finance; seasonal finance; medium term finance; transaction banking
- Services: Retail Banking Commercial Banking Corporate and Investment Banking
- Revenue: ▲PKR 7.75 billion (2014)
- Subsidiaries: PICIC Asset Management Company (PICIC AMC)
- Website: www.nibpk.com

NIB Bank was a Pakistani private, commercial bank based in Karachi. It was formed in 2003 as a result of merger of IFIC Bank and the National Development Leasing Corporation (NDLC), and this newly formed entity was called the NDLC-IFIC Bank (NIB).

The bank was established through the efforts of Khawaja Iqbal Hassan and Sultan Ali Allana (now Chairman, HBL). In 2004, soon after NIB's creation, Fullerton Financial Holdings, a subsidiary of Temasek Holdings, acquired a majority stake in the bank. This was one of the largest foreign direct investments in Pakistan at that time.

Fullerton Financial Holdings at that time had stakes in banks across Asia and ran highly successful SME and commercial businesses. Their models were adopted at NIB Bank and the Pakistan banking industry saw its first structured commercial and SME lending programs.

As of Dec 31, 2015 NIB Bank had a paid up capital of PKR 103 billion and total assets of PKR 243 billion. The bank had presence in 52 cities in Pakistan with over 170 branches connected online. NIB Bank had around 3,000 employees and its head office was in the city of Karachi. NIB Bank's main business units included Retail Banking, Commercial Banking, Corporate and Investment Banking and Treasury Services. The bank competed with all other major banks operating in Pakistan.

NIB bank ceased its operations in Pakistan with effect from July 7, 2017 after its merger with the MCB and its assets now stand amalgamated into MCB.

== Senior management ==
Atif R. Bokhari was the President and Yameen Karai was the Chief Executive Officer.

Teo Cheng San, Roland had been an independent Chairman of the Board of NIB Bank since 1 August 2011.

== History ==
NIB Bank completed ten years of operations in 2013. The Bank came into being in October 2003 after two financial entities were merged: the National Development Leasing Corporation (NDLC) and IFIC Bank. The new bank was named NIB Bank. As NIB Bank grew, it continued to acquire more banks. The Pakistan-based operations of Credit Agricole Indosuez were acquired in April 2004. In 2007, PICIC Commercial Bank Limited was also acquired by NIB Bank.

Pakistan Industrial Credit & Investment Corp. Ltd was merged with NIB Bank on 01-Jan-2008.

Temasek Holdings of Singapore continues to be the single largest investor in NIB Bank, through its wholly owned subsidiary, with a stake in excess of 88%.

== Financial indicators – financial year 2015 ==
Advances	Rs. 110.669 billion
Deposits and other accounts	Rs. 130.445 billion
Total Assets	Rs. 243.497 billion
Net Assets	Rs. 17.140 billion
