= Super Asia Group =

Pakistani conglomerate company

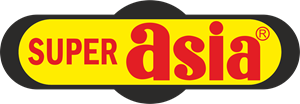
- Founded: 1975; 51 years ago
- Founder: Mian Mohammad Din
- Headquarters: Gujranwala, Pakistan,
- Revenue: Rs. 2 Billion
- Website: superasiagroup.com

Super Asia Group is a Pakistani conglomerate company which has business interests in manufacturing of home appliances, motorcycles and rickshaws, fast food chains, and grocery stores. It is based in Gujranwala, Pakistan.

== History ==
It was founded in 1975 by Mian Mohammad Din.

== Companies ==
- Super Asia brand
- Whirlpool Pakistan
- Super Asia Motorcycles and Rickshaws
- Hardee's Pakistan, established in 2008
