= Heavy Mechanical Complex =

Industrial complex in Taxila, Punjab, Pakistan

- Company type: State-owned enterprise
- Industry: Mechanical engineering
- Founded: 1977; 49 years ago
- Headquarters: Taxila, Punjab, Pakistan
- Area served: Pakistan
- Owner: Govt of Pakistan
- Website: hmc.com.pk

Heavy Mechanical Complex (HMC) is a Pakistani state-owned manufacturer based in Taxila. It operates under two divisions: Mechanical Division and Foundry and Forge Division.

== History ==
Heavy Mechanical Complex was built in the 1960s at a cost of $31 million with the technical assistance of China. It was established by the Pakistan Industrial Development Corporation and became operational in 1971. In 1977, Heavy Foundry and Forge was established adjacent to the complex which was merged into the Heavy Mechanical Complex in 1990.

== Operations ==
It manufactures equipment for hydro-electric power plants, thermal power plants, sulphuric acid plants, industrial alcohol plants, oil and gas processing plants, and chemical and petro-chemical plants. Boilers, cranes, construction machinery, material handling equipment, steel structure, sugar mills, cement plants and railway equipment are the other products which are produced there.

== See also ==
- Heavy Electrical Complex
