= Genco University =

Genco University is a privately held institution that is located in Nairobi, Kenya. This institution is not owned by the country and is privately funded. It can also be considered a closed corporation. It is an online university that specializes in an online curriculum for potential students who are interested in non-traditional learning, or potential students who are convinced by non-traditional learning. The school was created to help people with time, space, and distance barriers to receive an education. Since the establishment of the institution in 2008, it has employed a minimum of 50 employees. In order to get international recognition, the college is trying to get accreditation from the Commission for Higher Education (CHE).

== See also ==
- Universities in Kenya
