= Shezan =

Pakistani beverage manufacturer

- Native name: شیزان
- Type: Public
- Traded as: PSX: SHEZ
- Industry: Beverages and food products
- Founded: May 30, 1964; 62 years ago
- Founder: Chaudhry Shah Nawaz
- Headquarters: Lahore, Pakistan
- Areas served: Worldwide
- Key people: Humayun A. Shahnawaz (CEO); Muneer Nawaz (chairman)
- Products: Fruit juices Squashes; Ketchup; Pickles; Jams and marmalades
- Brands: All Pure; Twist; Shezan Mango
- Revenue: ▲ Rs. 8.745 billion (US$31 million) (2023)
- Operating income: ▼ Rs. 333.318 million (US$1.2 million) (2023)
- Net income: ▼ Rs. 38.765 million (US$140,000) (2023)
- Total assets: ▲ Rs. 4.915 billion (US$18 million) (2023)
- Total equity: ▼ Rs. 2.095 billion (US$7.5 million) (2023)
- Number of employees: 227 (2023)
- Website: shezan.com
- Footnotes; Financials as of 30 June 2023

Shezan International Limited (Urdu: شیزان) is a Pakistani food processing and beverage manufacturer headquartered in Lahore. Its brands include All Pure and Twist. It is part of Shahnawaz Group and is listed on the Pakistan Stock Exchange.

Since its inception in 1964, Shezan has produced various products including soft drinks, juices, ketchups, and jams. The company is also the single largest grower of mangoes in Pakistan, and employs roughly 1,000 people.

== History ==
Shezan International was incorporated on May 13, 1964 by Chaudhry Shah Nawaz as a joint venture between Shahnawaz Group and Amcor. The United States Agency for International Development (USAID) provided a loan of $2.5 million to support the purchase of the necessary equipment.

In 1965, Shezan began test marketing orange juice and established its fruit processing and bottling plant, along with its headquarters, in Lahore. The original orange juice formulation, developed by Emmanuel Yokus of the company's research and development department, was not successful with consumers. In 1967, Shezan expanded its product range to include mango, grape, apple, and berry juices. In 1968, Amcor exited Pakistan and sold its equity to the Shahnawaz Group. A year later, in 1969, Shezan introduced Lemon Barley juice.

Production capacity was tripled in 1978 and doubled again in 1982. In 1980–81, a separate unit was installed in Karachi to serve Sindh and meet export demand. A bottle filling plant was commissioned in Lahore in 1983, and an independent Tetra Brik plant followed in 1987.

In 1989, Shezan was listed on the Karachi Stock Exchange through an initial public offering at a strike price of Rs. 38 per share.

In 1990, Shezan opened a juice factory in Hattar, Khyber Pakhtunkhwa, Pakistan.

== Ownership ==
Shezan has been the frequent target of controversy due to the Ahmadiyya affiliation of its owners. Several campaigns led by religious conservatives have in the past targeted Shezan, calling for its boycott, and subsequent ban.

In June 2010, unidentified assailants attacked the Shezan factory in Lahore with a high-explosive device, injuring four people and damaging portions of the plant; investigators linked the attack to earlier sectarian attacks on Ahmadi places of worship in the city.

In February 2012, the Lahore Bar Association banned Shezan products from its premises and subordinate court complexes after 100 lawyers voted in favour of the prohibition due to owners' Ahmadiyya faith.

In June 2022, the Supreme Court of Pakistan ruled in favour of Shezan Services, a Shahnawaz Group entity, in a 33-year-old trademark dispute with Shezan Bakers and Confectioners, finding that Shahnawaz Limited had registered the Shezan label on 30 September 1958, three decades before the bakery firm applied for registration in 1988.
