= TPS Pakistan =

Pakistani technology company

- Company type: Private Limited Company
- Industry: Financial services
- Founded: 1996 ^{1}
- Founders: Mohammad Sohail; Mubashir Rahim
- Headquarters: Karachi, Pakistan
- Area served: Europe, Middle East, Africa and South Asia
- Key people: Mohammad Sohail (Director); Mubashir Rahim (Director); Ovais Habib Khan (COO); Shahzad Shahid (CEO) in 2017
- Products: Switching middleware atm & pos controller inter-bank shared switch payment gateway remittance gateway internet banking system emv personalization
- Number of employees: Over 500 (2021)
- Website: tpsworldwide.com

TPS Pakistan is a Pakistani technology company established in 1996 by two entrepreneurs Mohammed Sohail and Mubashir Rahim.

== Company background ==
TPS Pakistan's two founders, Mohammad Sohail and Mubashir Rahim, completed their higher education in engineering in the United States. After gaining experience at NCR Corporation, a software and electronics company specialised in computer servers and ATMs, they returned to Pakistan in the early 1990s. In Karachi, they established their own software company, focusing on networking connectivity, particularly within the banking and financial sectors.

== Accomplishments ==
=== Business agreements with other companies ===
- In 2017 National Bank of Pakistan launched 'Pre-paid' cards with the cooperation of TPS Pakistan company.
- As of 2015 TPS Pakistan claimed that approximately 40 microfinance banks were using their inter-bank shared switch, 1LINK, an interbank network in Pakistan. Before adopting TPS's software, banks in Pakistan could only connect to their own ATMs during regular banking hours. There was a pressing need for constant, 24/7 online connectivity, not only with their own ATMs but also with those of other banks, to provide customers with the convenience of using any ATM regardless of their bank. TPS Pakistan's solution addressed this need, enhancing the efficiency and accessibility of ATM services across the country.
- TPS Pakistan reportedly claims that they developed the badly needed Inter-Bank Fund Transfer (IBFT) technology in Pakistan which then allowed electronic fund transfers from bank to bank in real time.
- As this technology already existed in many countries, TPS Pakistan reportedly wanted to introduce it in Pakistan with their developed software to allow people to do their basic banking transactions through the internet and mobile phones.

== See also ==
- List of companies involved with ATMs
