= Bareezé =

High-end fashion retailer

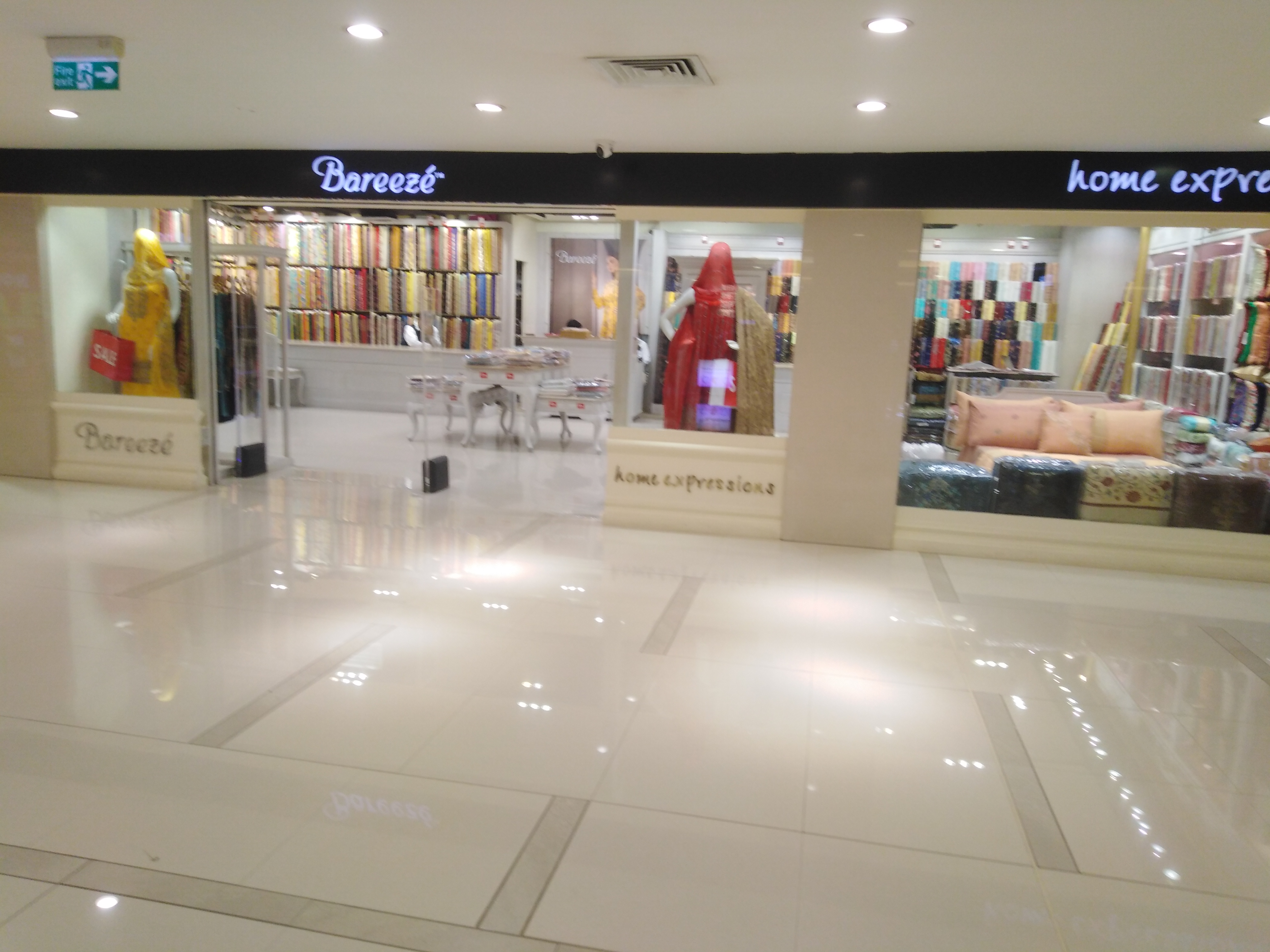
- Native name: بریزے
- Industry: Fashion high-end retailer
- Founded: 1985; 41 years ago
- Founders: Seema Aziz; Hamid Zaman
- Headquarters: Lahore, Pakistan
- Number of locations: 450 (2016)
- Number of employees: 5000 (2010)
- Parent: Eastgate Industries (Pvt) Ltd Formerly known as Sefam (Pvt) Ltd
- Website: eastgateindustries.com

Bareezé is a Pakistani high-end fashion retailer which is based in Lahore, Pakistan.

It has its operations in Malaysia, United Arab Emirates, and the United Kingdom. It was founded by Pakistani fashion designer and philanthropist Seema Aziz.

== History ==
Founded in 1985 in Lahore by Hamid Zaman and Seema Aziz. Its parent company is Eastgate Industries (Pvt.) Ltd.

== Brands ==
- TFS - THE FABRIC STORE
- MINNIE MINORS (for children)
- CHINYERE
- SUPER SQUAD
- RANG JA
- BAREEZÉ MAN
- BAREEZÉ HOME EXPRESSIONS
- FRED
- Polo Ralph Lauren
- Emporio Armani
- The Entertainer

== Network ==
Bareezé has 90 shops in Pakistan and four other countries: India, Malaysia, United Arab Emirates and United Kingdom. It also has a network of franchises. The company has nearly 5000 employees.

== Council of Business Leaders ==
Bareezé co-founder Seema Aziz became a member of the Council of Business Leaders formed by the Prime Minister of Pakistan, Imran Khan in October 2018.
