= Pakistan Industrial Credit and Investment Corporation =

Financial Institution

- Industry: Banking and Financial
- Founded: 1957; 69 years ago
- Headquarters: Pakistan
- Subsidiaries: PICIC Assets Management Company; PICIC Commercial Bank

Pakistan Industrial Credit and Investment Corporation (PICIC) is a financial institution in Pakistan, one of the first development finance institutions established with the World Bank Group assistance in 1957. In 2007, PICIC Commercial Bank was bought by the Singapore-owned NIB Bank.

== History ==
PICIC Insurance Limited is a part of the Temasek Holdings. NIB Bank Limited, a Temasek subsidiary in Pakistan, is a major shareholder of PICIC Insurance Limited with a 30% stake. Temasek Holdings is an investment company owned by the government of Singapore, through which is managed a portfolio of more than US$100 billion, focused primarily in Asia.

In June 2016, the board of directors of PICIC Insurance approved the arrangement for the company’s acquisition by Crescent Star Insurance. In a securities filing, PICIC Insurance said the deal would take place at the swap ratio of one to four, meaning that any person or institution holding four shares in PICIC Insurance would end up owning one share in Crescent Star Insurance post-acquisition.
