= Pakola =

Carbonated soft drink from Pakistan

- Type: Cream soda
- Origin: Pakistan
- Introduced: 14 August 1950; 76 years ago
- Color: Green
- Flavor: Ice-cream Soda
- Variants: Pakola Fresh Lime; Pakola Orange; Pakola Raspberry; Pakola Ice-cream Soda; Pakola Lychee; Pakola Pomegranate
- Website: pakola.com.pk

Pakola, derived from Pakistan-Cola, is a flavoured carbonated soft drink from Pakistan.

== History ==
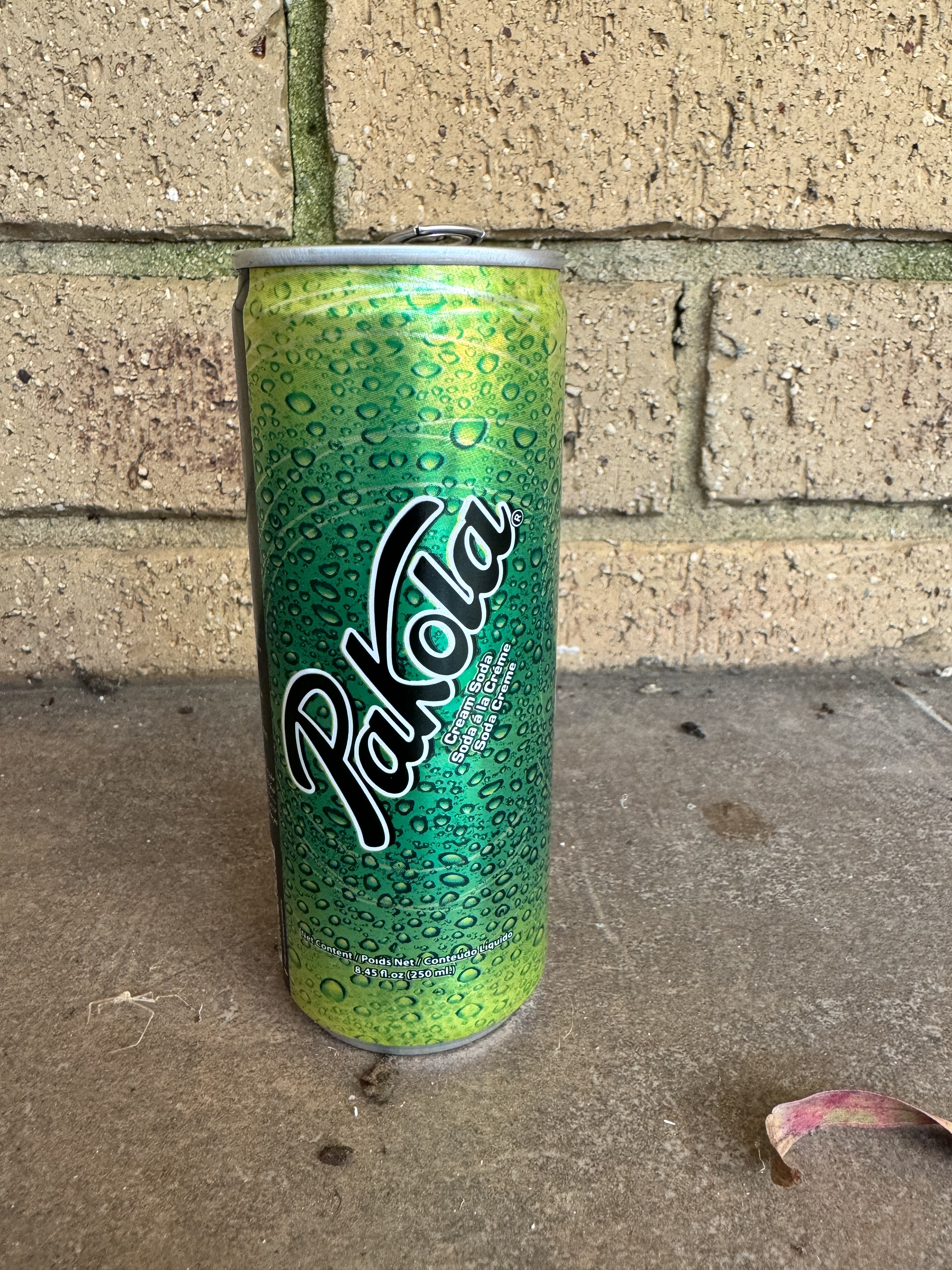
The official Pakola drink can in December 2024

Pakola was the creation of seven brothers from the Telii family of Dhoraji in India, who migrated to Pakistan in 1947. The idea of Pakola came from its founder Haji Ali Mohammad Tali, who dreamed of developing a drink that portrayed the true reflection and taste of Pakistan.

The drink debuted at the Pakistan Air Force base on 14 August 1950, the anniversary of Pakistan's independence, during an event attended by the first Prime Minister, Liaquat Ali Khan.

In the early 1960s, people began mixing Pakola with chilled milk and serving it in jugs during the communal 'iftars' in the month of Ramadan. This helped increase its consumption and popularity.

Later, Pakistan Beverages (PB) was founded at Karachi's S.I.T.E. industrial area, which became the production hub for Pakola. In 1979, Pakistan Beverages was announced as a new production facility for Pepsi. This led to the founding of Mehran Bottlers, managed by Haji Ali Mohammad's nephews, Zafir Habib and Arif Habib. They continued to produce the drink along with other products such as Apple Sidra and Bubble Up.

In 2004, Mehran Bottlers and Pakistan Beverages started manufacturing cans in Pakistan. That same year, Zeeshan Z. Habib took charge as the chief executive officer of Mehran Bottlers.

== Ingredients and varieties ==
Pakola is made with carbonated water, sugar, citric acid, cream soda artificial flavor, Color: FD&C Bleu No 1 (E 133), FD&C Yellow No.5 (E 102), and sodium benzoate. A typical can of Pakola (8.5 fl ounces/250 ml) has 34 g of sugar, 15 mg of sodium, 0 g of cholesterol, 0 g fat, 0 g of protein, and 130 calories.

Several of the variants that have been introduced by Pakola:

- Pakola Ice Cream Soda (1950)
- Pakola Orange (1985)
- Pakola Raspberry (1985)
- Pakola Lychee (1991)
- Pakola Fresh Lime (2006)
- Pakola Water (2015)
- Pakola Pomegranate (2016)
- Pakola Vimto
- Apple Sidra
- Forest (Club Soda)

== Production and distribution ==
Pakola is currently produced by Mehran Bottlers. Pakola is now available in America, Africa, Australia, Canada, Middle East, New Zealand and the United Kingdom. It is the only carbonated beverage manufactured in Pakistan that is exported globally.

Due to the introduction of the capacity tax in 2013, Pakola discontinued the production and distribution of all glass-bottled products. The tax was levied on the overall production and distribution capacity rather than on output, which was detrimental to companies with lower production levels or smaller markets. Following the collapse of this system, Mehran Bottlers quickly established their PET lines to regain market share.
