= PHA Foundation =

Housing Authority of the Government of Pakistan

- موَسسہ پی ایچ اے
- Formation: May 18, 1999; 27 years ago
- Type: GO
- Headquarters: Ground Floor Shaheed-e-Millat Secretariat Islamabad
- Coordinates: 33.723954°N 73.080738°E
- Region served: Pakistan
- CEO: Amir Mohyuddin
- Website: pha.gov.pk

The PHA Foundation, (موَسسہ پی ایچ اے) short form for Pakistan Housing Authority Foundation, (Urdu: پاکستان موَسسہَ اختیاریہ برائے اقامت کاری) is a government body based in Islamabad, Pakistan, with offices in Lahore (31.454055°N 74.239937°E) and Karachi (24.924614°N 67.142528°E). The PHA Foundation controls and helps in building housing societies and communities in modern ways. It was established on May 18, 1999, to help improving housings. This organization is controlled by the Ministry of Housing and Works (Pakistan).
