= Sapphire Retail =

Pakistani fashion and lifestyle brand

Sapphire

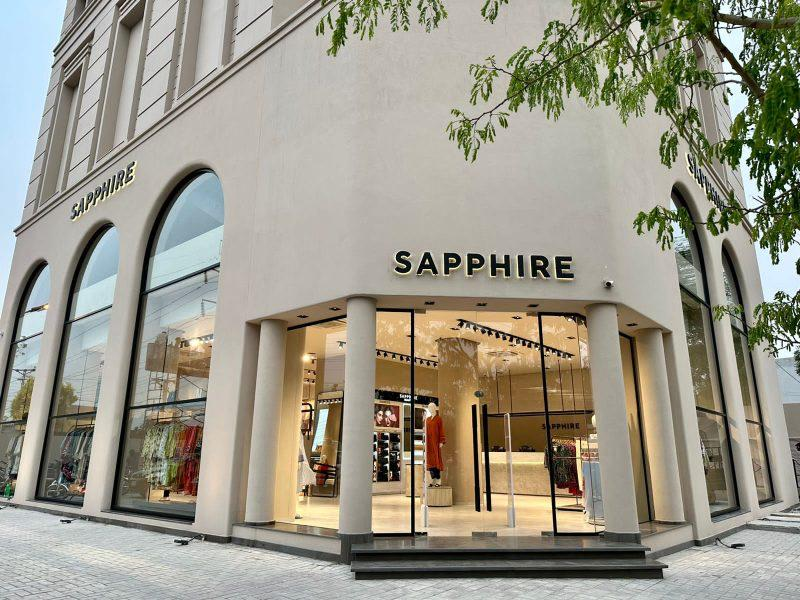
- Native name: سافایر
- Type: Private
- Industry: Retail
- Founded: 2014; 12 years ago
- Founder: Nabeel Abdullah
- Headquarters: Lahore, Pakistan
- Number of locations: Pakistan: 50+ (2025); United Kingdom: 2 (2025); United Arab Emirates: 1 (2025)
- Area served: Worldwide
- Key people: Nabeel Abdullah (CEO)
- Products: Clothing, accessories, and fragrances
- Parent: Sapphire Textile
- Website: sapphireonline.pk

Sapphire Retail Limited (/ˈsæf.aɪə/; Urdu pronunciation: [sə.faɪr]), commonly known as Sapphire (stylized in all caps), is a Pakistani fashion retail subsidiary of Sapphire Textile which is part of the Sapphire Group. Based in Lahore, Sapphire sells clothing, accessories, and fragrances.

== History ==
=== Early history ===
Sapphire was founded in 2014 by Nabeel Abdullah as a subsidiary of Sapphire Textile, which is part of Sapphire Group. It opened its first retail store at Dolmen Mall in Karachi in December 2014, Initially it operated as a brick-and-mortar retailer focused on high-end two-piece and three-piece suits.

In July 2019, Sapphire launched Sapphire West, offering Western-style clothing, and later that year introduced its sleepwear line. Simultaneously, Sapphire launched Little by Little, a programme to lower environmental impact through sustainable manufacturing.

=== Expansion ===
In early 2024, Sapphire began delivering its products internationally. Later, in October 2024, Sapphire opened its first international retail outlet in The Broadway Mall, Bradford, United Kingdom, followed by another retail store in Bullring, Birmingham. In 2025, a store was opened in Sharjah, United Arab Emirates.

== Operations ==
Sapphire operates as a multi-category retailer with three divisions: fashion, accessories and fragrances. The fashion division began with women's wear, selling unstitched fabric and ready-to-wear garments for daily and formal use, and later expanded to include western-style clothing, menswear and kidswear. The accessories division comprises handbags and shoes, while the fragrances division includes perfumes and body mists for men and women.

Sapphire owns its manufacturing plants, which are operated by its parent company, Sapphire Textile. As of 2020, manufacturing plants included four spinning mills, one weaving mill, two stitching plants, and one processing plant.

Sapphire distributes its products in Pakistan and internationally through its online platforms and retail stores. As of 2025, Sapphire operates 50 retail stores in Pakistan, two retail stores in the United Kingdom, and a retail store in the United Arab Emirates.
