= Soneri Bank =

Leading Personal and Commercial Bank in Pakistan.

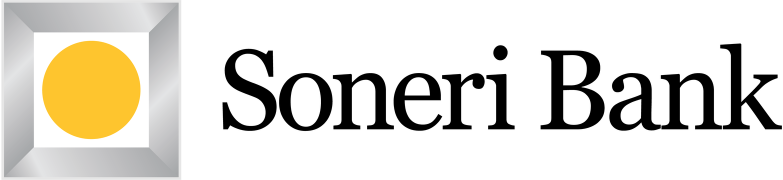
- Traded as: PSX: SNBL
- Founded: 28 September 1991; 34 years ago
- Headquarters: Karachi, Pakistan
- Key people: Amin A. Feerasta (Chairman); Ahsan Mushahid Siddiqui (CEO & President)
- Products: Loans; Debit Cards; Savings; Consumer Banking; Business Banking Banking
- Revenue: ▲ Rs. 31.702 billion (US$110 million) (2024)
- Operating income: ▲ Rs. 12.639 billion (US$45 million) (2024)
- Net income: ▼ Rs. 5.901 billion (US$21 million) (2024)
- Total assets: ▲ Rs. 739.50 billion (US$2.6 billion) (2024)
- Total equity: ▲ Rs. 30.81 billion (US$110 million) (2024)
- Number of employees: 4,930 (2024)
- Website: www.soneribank.com

Soneri Bank Limited (Urdu pronunciation: [so.ˈneː.ri bɛŋk] so-NAY-ree-BANK) is a leading personal and commercial bank in Pakistan based in Karachi. Its head office is located in the PNSC Building. Soneri Bank started its operation in the year 1992.

Amin A. Feerasta is Chairman of the Bank.
