= Bank of Khyber =

Provincial multi-branch government bank in Pakistan

The Bank of Khyber
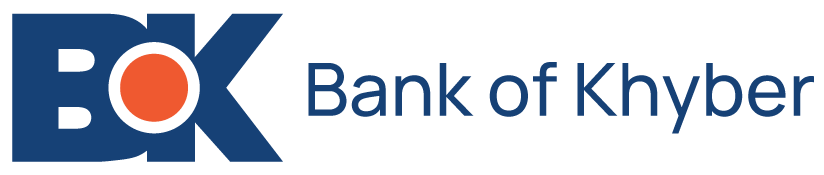
- Type: Public
- Traded as: PSX: BOK
- Founded: 1991; 35 years ago
- Number of locations: 298
- Key people: Hassan Raza (CEO); Ikramullah Khan (chairman)
- Revenue: ▲ Rs. 23.126 billion (US$83 million) (2025)
- Operating income: ▲ Rs. 12.282 billion (US$44 million) (2025)
- Net income: ▲ Rs. 5.81 billion (US$21 million) (2025)
- Total assets: ▼ Rs. 453.29 billion (US$1.6 billion) (2025)
- Total equity: ▲ Rs. 23.676 billion (US$85 million) (2025)
- Owner: Government of Khyber Pakhtunkhwa (66.85%); Ismail Industries Limited (23.2%)
- Number of employees: 2,113 (2025)
- Website: bok.com.pk
- Footnotes; Financials as of 31 December 2025

The Bank of Khyber (/ˈkaɪbər/ KY-bər) is a provincial government bank owned by Government of Khyber Pakhtunkhwa and based in Peshawar, Pakistan, with 260 branches all over the country.

== History ==
It was set up as a state-owned, regional bank in 1991 along with the Bank of Punjab and the First Women Bank. It offers Conventional banking, Islamic banking services and microfinance loans.

In January 2006, the bank had an initial public offering of its shares at Karachi Stock Exchange at an offer price of PKR 15.

== Branch network ==
Currently the bank has 260 branches as of August 2023. The bank is operating with Conventional as well as dedicated Islamic Banking Branches. Further, sub branches and booths are also providing basic banking facilities to the customers. Through this network, the bank is able to offer wide range of products and services to its valuable customers.

== BOK Digital ==
The bank launched its mobile application called BOK Digital on January 15, 2021.
