= Syed Wajid Ali =

Pakistani industrialist (1911-2008)

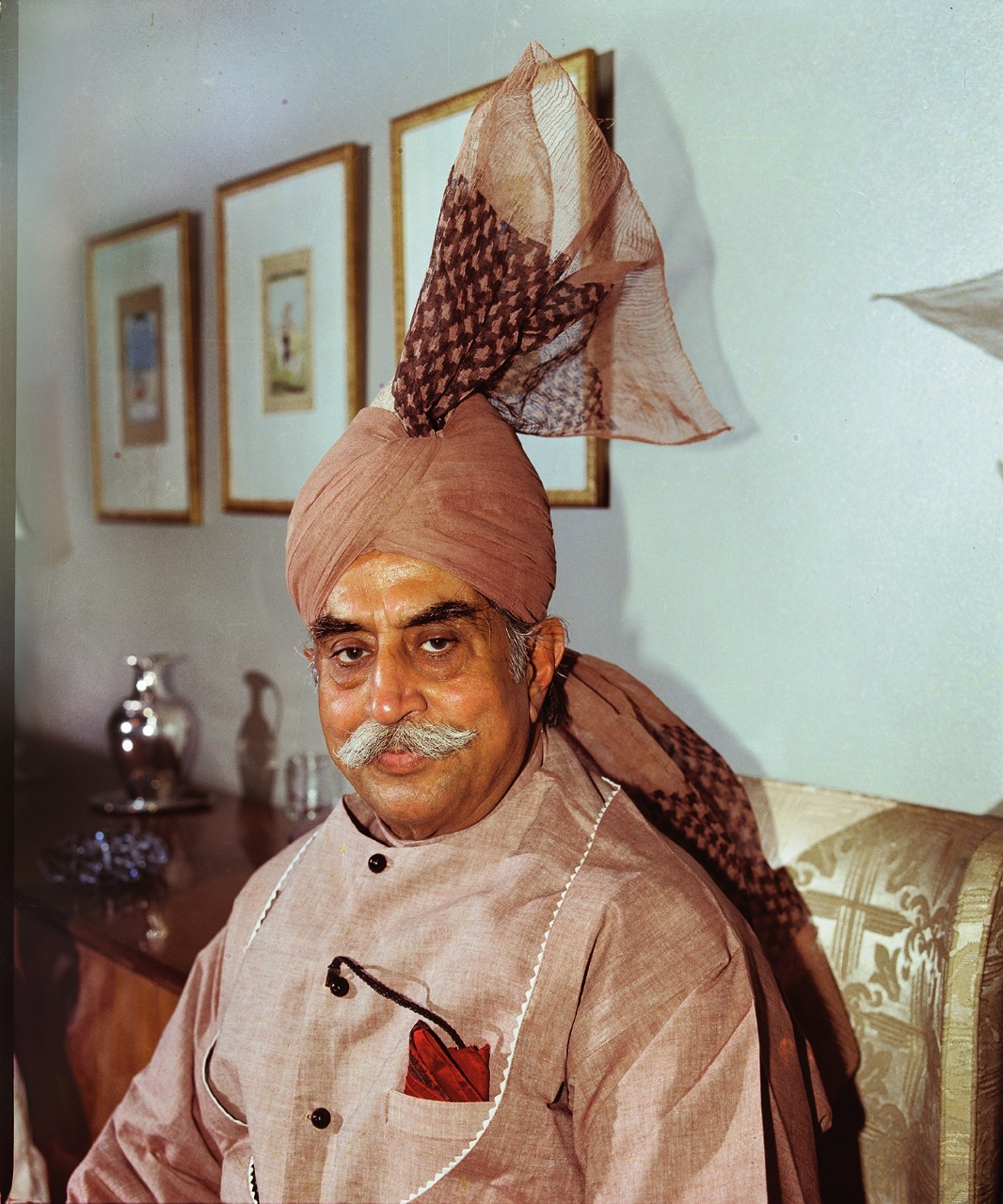
- Syed Wajid Ali at a family dinner
- Born: 20 December 1911; Lahore, Punjab, British India
- Died: 14 June 2008 (aged 96); Lahore, Pakistan
- Occupation: Industrialist
- Known for: International Olympic Committee, Pakistan Movement
- Children: Syed Shahid Ali
- Relatives: Syed Amjad Ali (brother); Syed Babar Ali (brother)

Syed Wajid Ali (Urdu: سید واجد علی) (20 December 1911 – 14 June 2008) was a Pakistani industrialist served as President of Pakistan Olympic Association from 1978 until he retired in 2004, and became the longest serving president in the history of the association. He also promoted arts and culture as well as Red Crescent (Red Cross) in Pakistan.

In addition, he served as Chairman, All Pakistan Music Conference in the 1960s.

== Life ==
Wajid Ali, was born on 20 December 1911 in Lahore, Punjab, British India. He was the second son of Sir Syed Maratib Ali. Syed Wajid Ali was the younger brother of Syed Amjad Ali, former Permanent Representative of Pakistan to the United Nations.

In the early 1940s, he quit the British Indian Army to look after the growing family business. In 1945, he established a textile plant in Rahim Yar Khan, Punjab which was later wound up in 1997.

=== Pakistan movement activist ===
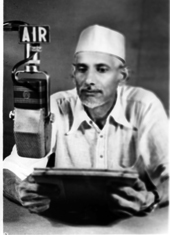
Syed Wajid Ali, All India Radio (AIR) - Calcutta - 24 June 1950

Syed Wajid Ali also became actively involved in the Pakistan Movement and closely worked for the cause alongside Muhammad Ali Jinnah and Fatima Jinnah. During the movement, he was nominated by the Muslim League on a three-member Committee to oversee the 'British government-arranged referendum' in the then North West Frontier Province.

== Business career ==
In Pakistan, he set up and managed a number of industrial ventures. Among the major projects was a Ford car manufacturing plant, which was subsequently taken over by the Government in 1973 as part of the nationalisation process of Zulfiqar Ali Bhutto. In his other industrial activities, he remained the chairman of some of the largest enterprises in Pakistan, including Packages Limited, Treet Corporation, Zulfeqar Industries, Loads Limited, and Wazir Ali Industries.

== Introduction of television in Pakistan ==
=== Syed Wajid Ali's contribution to Pakistan Television ===
Ali was the first person, who in 1961, signed a joint venture agreement with NEC of Japan to initiate a television project in Pakistan. Later, this proved to be a visionary first step in introducing television in Pakistan before it was introduced in India, Indonesia, Malaysia and some other Asian countries. Ubaidur Rahman, an electrical engineer who later became General Manager of Pakistan Television Corporation, Lahore Center, was appointed by him to lead this television project with the Japanese company. The project team conducted a series of pilot transmission tests. Then the control of this project was given to President Ayub Khan's government in 1962. A small studio within a tent in the Radio Pakistan compound in Lahore was set up to begin the television project work. Here a transmission tower was also constructed. Finally the first TV black and white transmission from Lahore took place on 26 Nov 1964 and television was introduced in Pakistan.

== Death ==
Syed Wajid Ali died after a protracted illness on 14 June 2008 at age 96. He had been a long-time diabetic patient and unwell for many years. He fought for his life, especially after both of his legs were amputated at Karachi's Liaquat National Hospital which was founded by him. He was buried at Miani Sahib Graveyard in Lahore, Pakistan.

== See also ==
- Pakistan Olympic Association
