= Emporium Mall =

Shopping mall in Johar Town, Lahore, Pakistan

Nishat Emporium
- مرکز خرید ایمپوریم

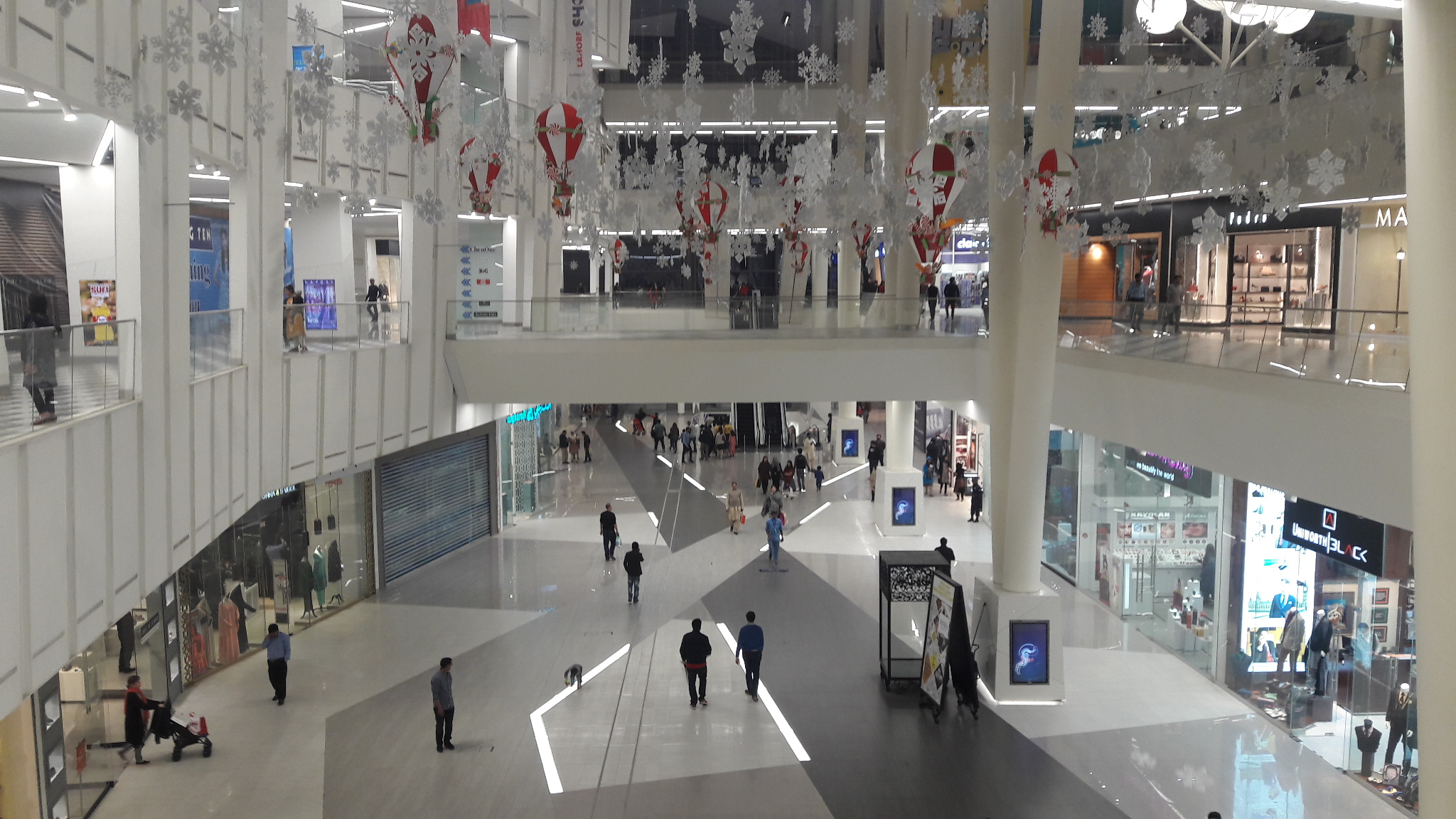
- Emporium Mall in Johar Town, Lahore
- Location: Johar Town, Lahore, Punjab, Pakistan
- Coordinates: 31°28′04″N 74°15′59″E
- Address: Abdul Haque Road, Q Block Johar Town
- Opened: 30 June 2016
- Developer: Nishat Group
- Manager: Nishat Hotels and Properties Limited
- Owner: Nishat Group
- Architect: Aedas
- Num. of stores: 200+
- Num. of anchor tenants: 6
- Floor area: 250,000 m^{2} (2,700,000 sq ft)
- Floors: 11
- Parking: Multilevel facility for about 2000 cars
- Public transit: Lahore Metrobus Expo Centre stop
- Website: nishatemporium.com

Nishat Emporium is a shopping mall of Pakistan located in Johar Town, Lahore southwest of Lahore International Expo Centre. The 11-storey mall is spread over 250,000 m^{2} (2,700,000 sq ft) and is home to over 200 stores and a five-star hotel. It is managed by the Nishat Hotels and Properties Limited, which is part of Nishat Group.

Opened in 2016, it is the second largest mall in Pakistan after the Lucky One Mall in Karachi and also one of the largest shopping malls of the world by gross leasable area.

== History ==
The mall's architecture was developed by AHR Architects, an international architectural firm and AHR Ali Naqvi Architects, a local architecture firm. Emporium Mall is located in Johar Town northeast of Lahore International Expo Centre and is home to over 200 stores including Hyperstar supermarket, Universal Cinemas, and a five-star hotel. In late 2012 or early 2013, Aedas was appointed to design the mall's architecture with cinemas, food courts, a hotel, retail space and wedding facilities.

The construction started in March 2013 at a cost of approximately rupees 25 billion (US$238.43 million). The project is owned by Nishat Group, with structural engineers Mushtaq and Bilal. The mall opened to the public on 29 June 2016. Even before opening, Hyperstar by Carrefour was already opened, about six month earlier.

In 2017, Emporium Mall became the second-largest mall after the construction of Lucky One Mall in Karachi and now Emporium Mall became third-largest mall after construction of The Grand Central Mall, Faisalabad. Emporium Mall is also one of the largest shopping malls of the world by gross leasable area. Emporium Mall is home to over 200 International and local brands. It also includes Universal Cinemas, Hyperstar supermarket and a large food court.

== Architecture ==
Emporium Mall is a thirteen-story building including nearly three-story parking ramps underneath the mall, with capacity to hold 2000 cars. Emporium Mall is about three-fifths as big as The Mall of America, or about half as big as Vatican City. The mall is nearly symmetric, with a rectangular floor plan. More than 200 international and local stores are arranged along 5 levels of pedestrian walkways.

== Attractions ==
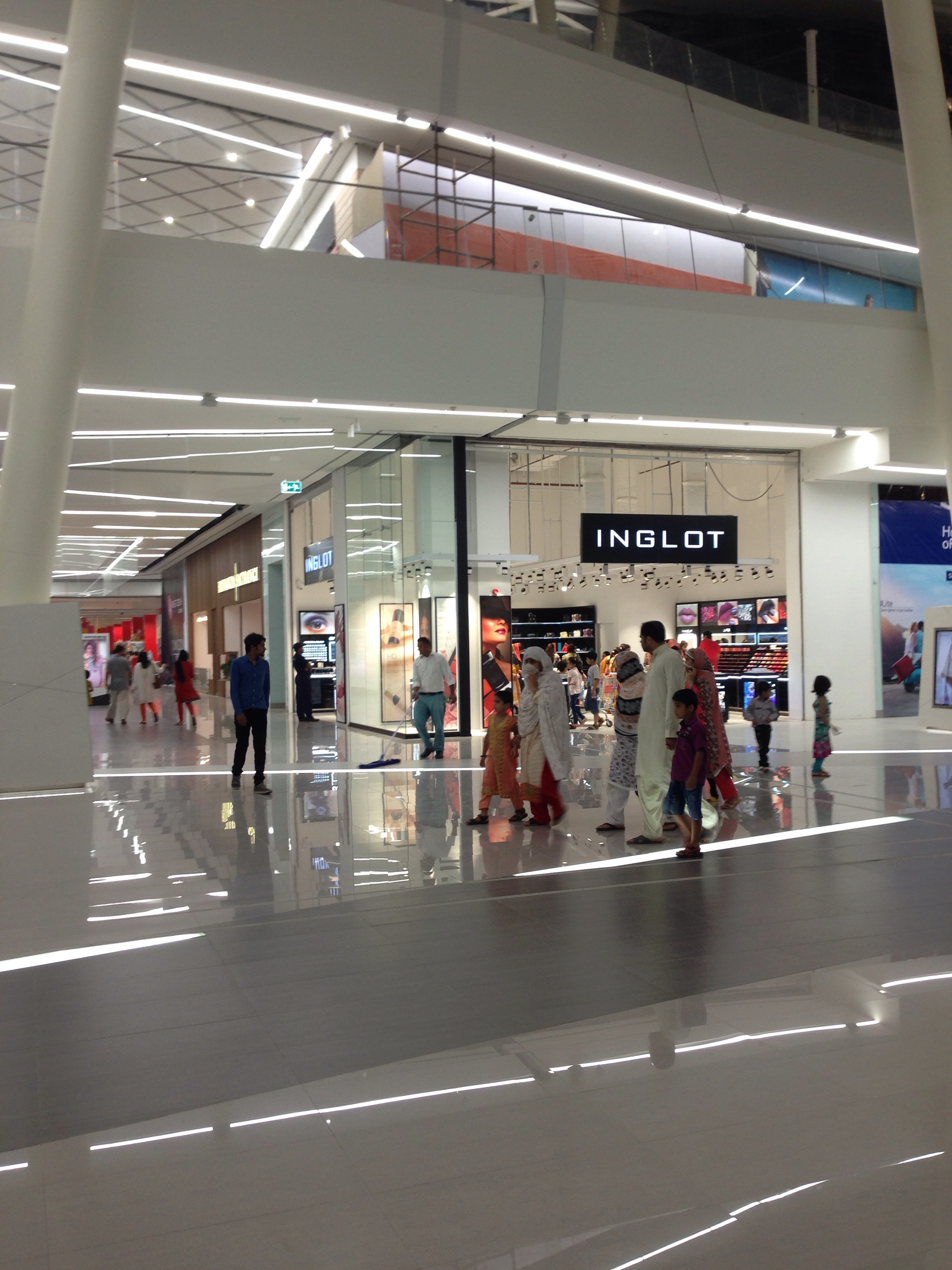
Mall during construction with a few shops in work.

Emporium Mall is home to over 200 International and local brands. It includes a nine screen multiplex cinema and Pakistan's largest cinema called Universal Cinemas. It also contains a large food court with a sitting area that accommodates 3000 people. Other features include Fun Factory Park (kids play area), The Bounce, banquet halls, restaurants, eateries, a large hypermarket named Hyperstar (Carrefour) and a 200-Room five star hotel. The mall also uses solar panels for back-up power.

== Incidents ==
- On 3 January 2018, Muhammad Usman, a 19-year-old electrician, died during repair work. He was trying to repair electric wires on the fourth floor when the ceiling collapsed on him. He sustained severe electric shocks and fell on the second floor from the top.

== Gallery ==
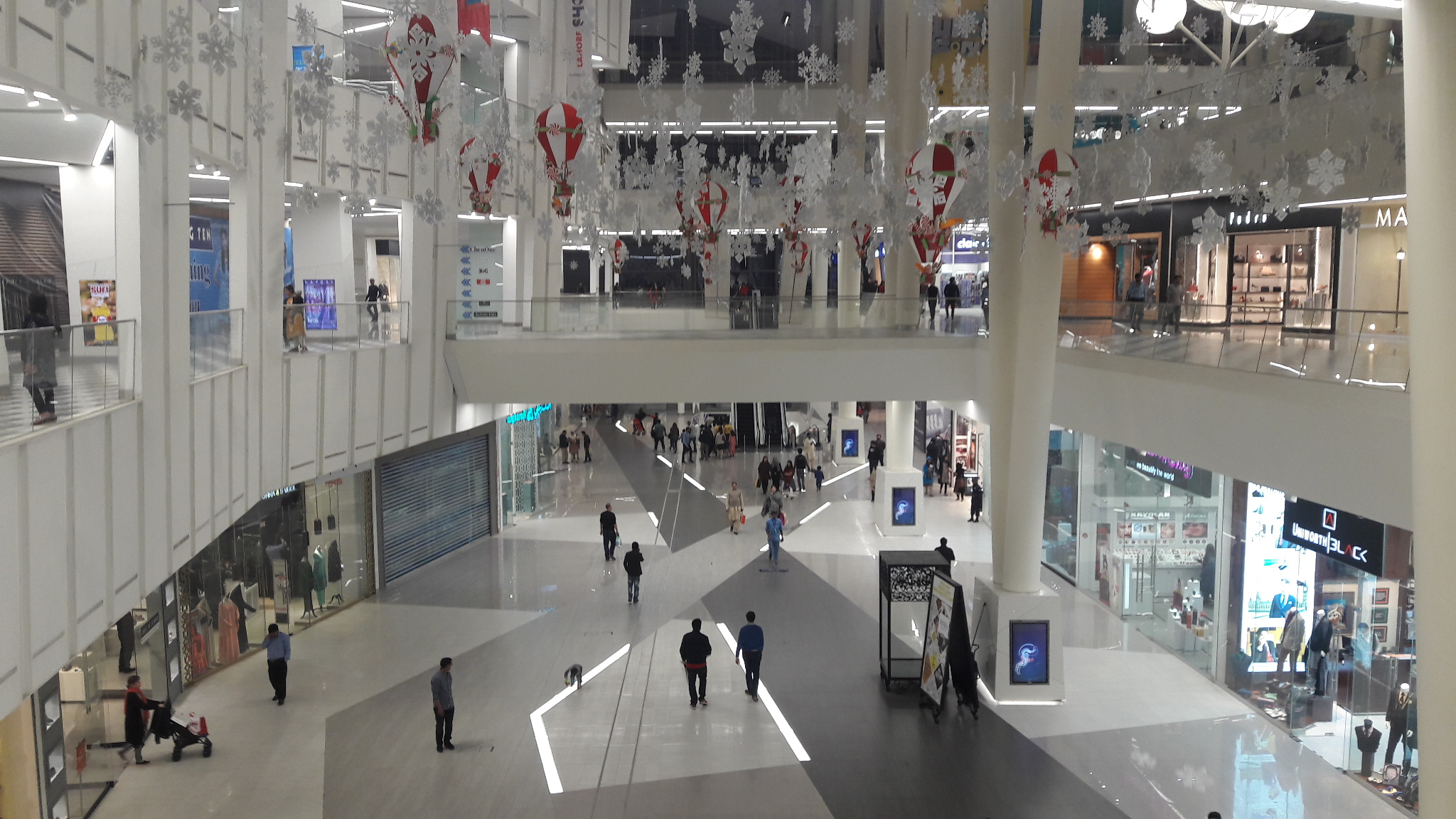
Emporium Mall

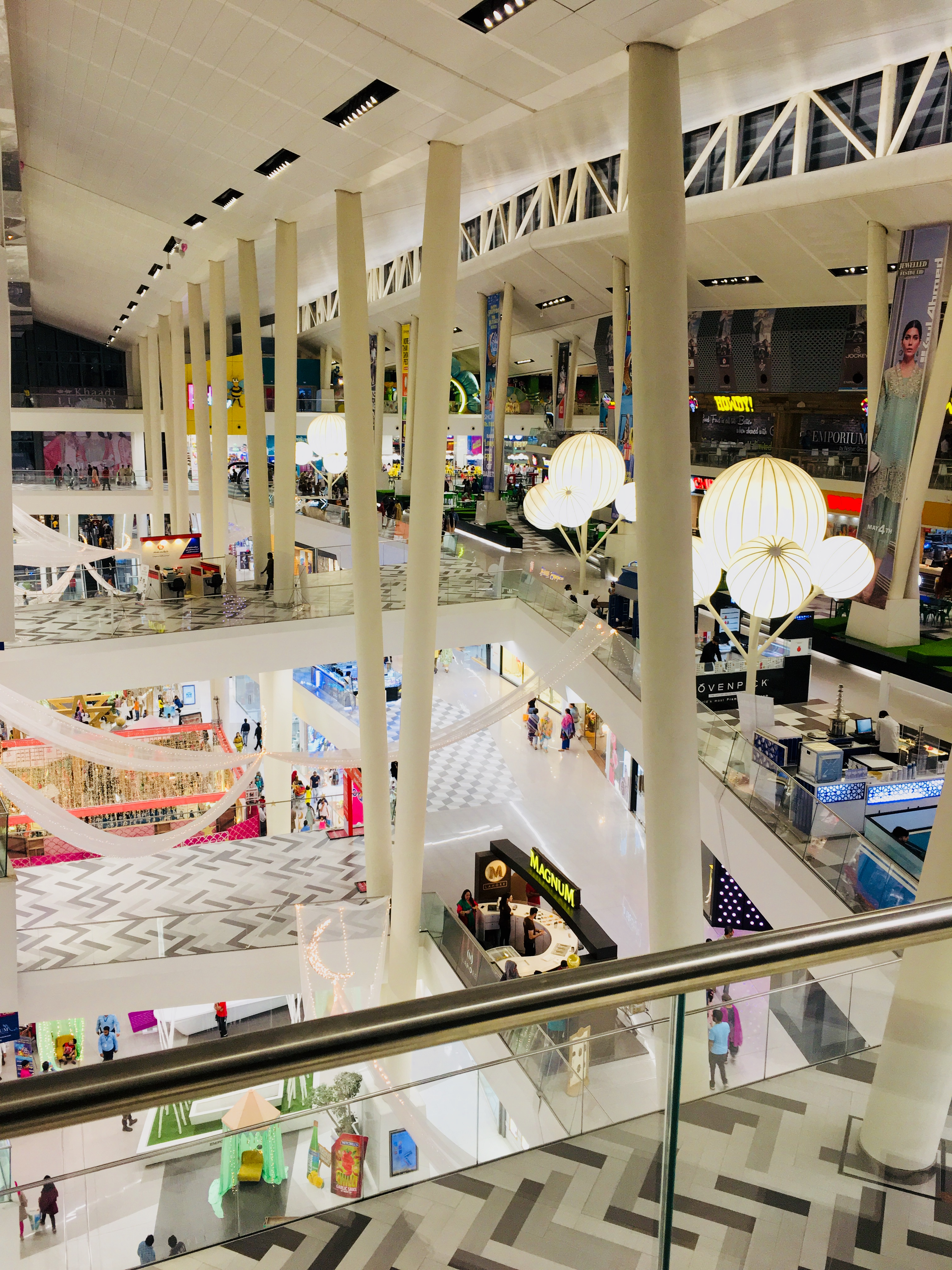
View of the food court on the third floor.

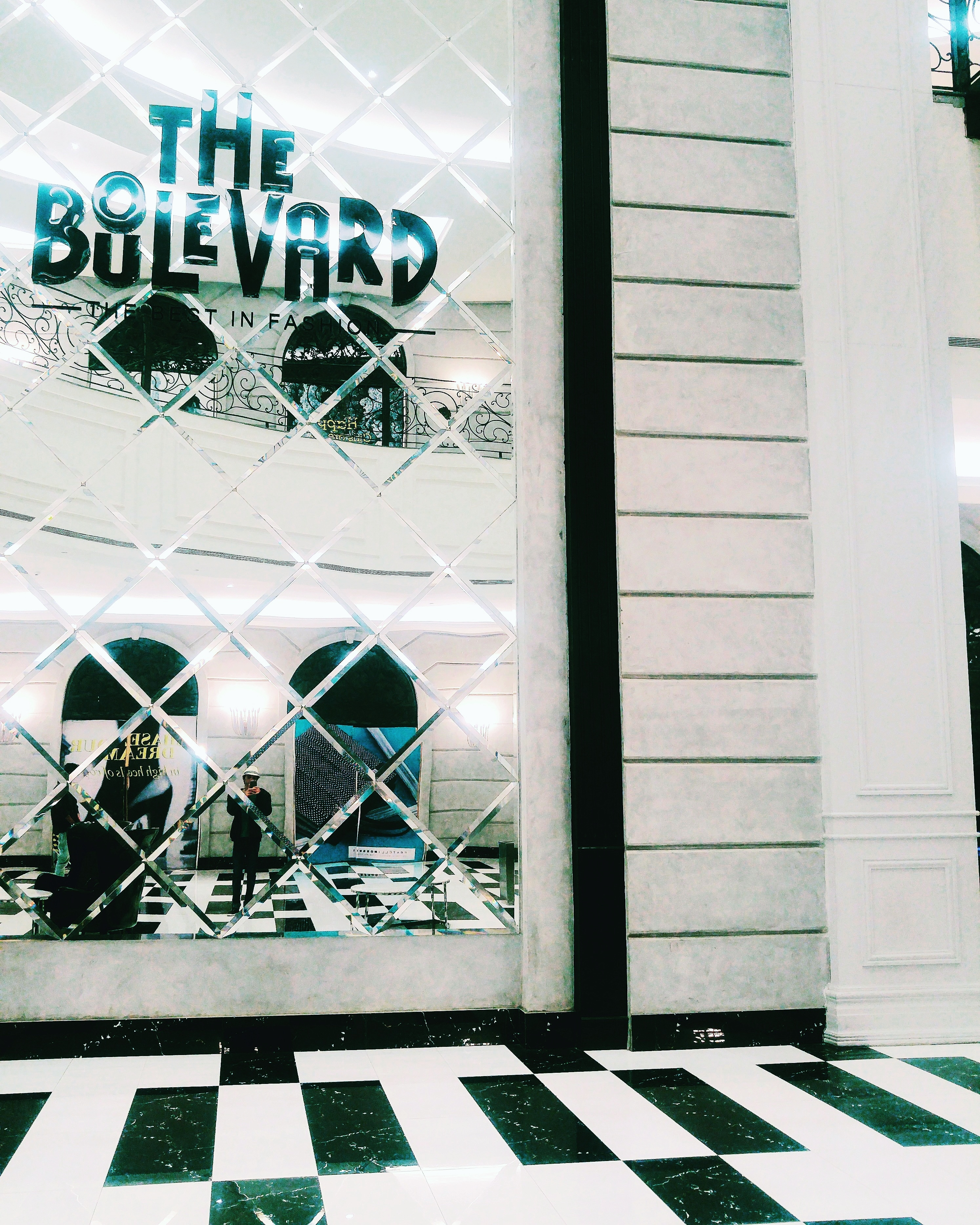
The Boulevard, situated on the third floor on the west side of the mall.

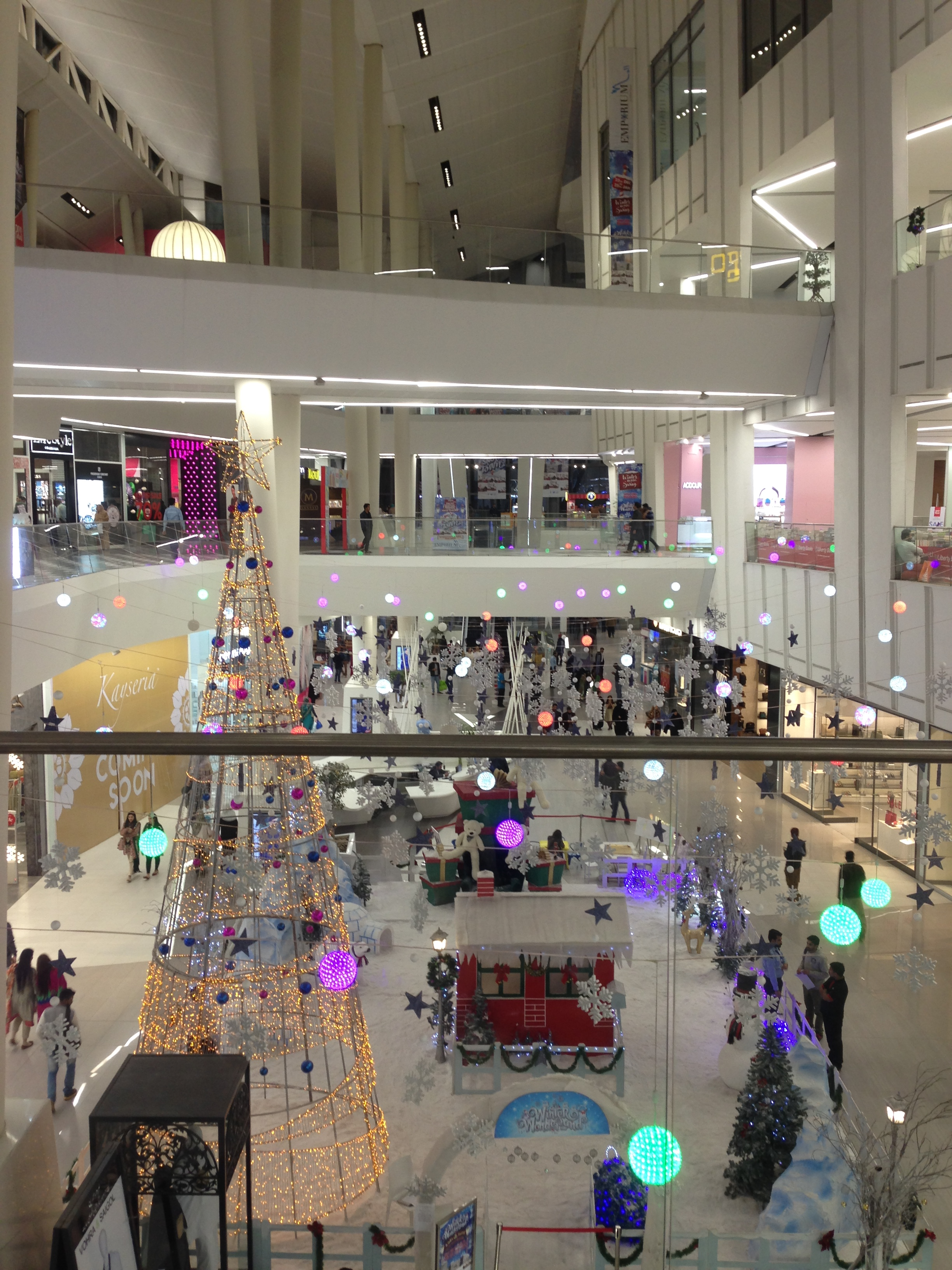
View of one of the pedestrian walkways in the mall.

== See also ==
- List of largest shopping malls in the world
- List of shopping malls in Pakistan
