= Nestlé Pakistan =

Pakistani subsidiary of Nestlé

- Native name: نیسلے پاکستان
- Formerly: Milkpak Limited (1979–1988); Nestlé Milkpak Limited (1988–2005)
- Type: Public
- Traded as: PSX: NESTLE; KSE 100 component
- Industry: Dairy
- Founded: 1979; 47 years ago
- Headquarters: Packages Mall, Shahrah-e-Roomi, Lahore-54760 Pakistan
- Key people: Joselito Jr Avanceña (CEO); Syed Yawar Ali (chairman)
- Products: Milk, milk-based products, cereals, beverages and bottled drinking water
- Revenue: ▲ Rs. 200.60 billion (US$720 million) (2023)
- Operating income: ▲ Rs. 29.04 billion (US$100 million) (2023)
- Net income: ▲ Rs. 16.49 billion (US$59 million) (2023)
- Total assets: ▲ Rs. 97.89 billion (US$350 million) (2023)
- Total equity: ▲ Rs. 10.58 billion (US$38 million) (2023)
- Owner: Nestlé S.A. (61.60%); IGI Investments (9.75%); Packages Limited (8.05%)
- Number of employees: 3,624 (2023)
- Parent: Nestlé
- Website: nestle.pk
- Footnotes; Financials as of 31 December 2023

Nestlé Pakistan Limited (/ˈnɛsleɪ/ NESS-lay), a subsidiary of the Swiss multinational Nestlé, is a leading food and beverage company based in Lahore, Pakistan. It produces and markets a diverse range of products, including dairy, confectionery, coffee, beverages, infant nutrition, and bottled drinking water.

The company is publicly traded on the Pakistan Stock Exchange.

== History ==
Nestlé Pakistan was incorporated in 1979 as Milkpak Limited. It started producing packaged milk in 1981.

In 1984, Milkpak acquired the Frost branded juice line from its parent company, Packages Limited. Milkpak Ltd further expanded its products with the launch of Milkpak butter in 1985 and a line of packaged cream in 1986.

In 1988, Nestlé acquired a controlling stake in Milkpak and subsequently it was renamed as Nestlé Milkpak Limited.

In 2015, Nestlé began delivering pasteurized milk to local homes in Lahore as a pilot project.

== Controversies and legal issues ==
During the 1990s, Nestlé allegedly repeated controversial infant formula marketing practices in Pakistan. This first emerged in developing countries during the 1977 Nestlé boycott. A Pakistani salesman named Syed Aamir Raza Hussain became a whistle-blower against Nestlé. In 1999, two years after he left Nestlé, Hussain released a report in association with the non-profit organisation, International Baby Food Action Network, in which he alleged that Nestlé was encouraging doctors to push its infant formula products over breastfeeding. Nestlé has denied Raza's allegations. This story inspired the 2014 acclaimed Indian film Tigers by the Oscar winning Bosnian director Danis Tanović.

Between 2013 and 2017, a forensic audit revealed that Nestlé Pakistan extracted 4.43 billion liters of groundwater without significant payments to government departments. Approximately 1.9 billion liters (43%) of this water was wasted, with 28% of the wastage remaining unexplained. During Supreme Court proceedings, a sample of Nestlé’s bottled water was found unfit for human consumption. The company defended its operations, citing the Reverse Osmosis process as a source of some water loss, but the justification for the remaining wastage was deemed inadequate by the court.

Nestlé Pakistan has faced allegations of violating international marketing codes for breast milk substitutes. In the 1990s, whistleblower Syed Aamir Raza Hussain accused the company of employing unethical practices, including providing material inducements to healthcare professionals to promote infant formula over breastfeeding. These practices allegedly contravened the World Health Organization's International Code of Marketing of Breast-milk Substitutes. Nestlé denied these allegations, which were later dramatized in the 2014 film Tigers by Danis Tanović.

In 2005, Nestlé Pakistan faced a notice from the Pakistan Standards & Quality Control Authority (PSQCA) for unauthorized sales of its "Pure Life" brand. Additionally, the company has been involved in legal disputes with Pakistani authorities over water contamination claims and regulatory compliance issues.

On February 25, 2025, former employee Asif Javed set himself on fire outside the Lahore High Court (LHC) to protest delays in his legal battle against Nestlé Pakistan. Javed had been dismissed in 2016 for alleged union activities and won reinstatement orders from labor courts in 2019, but Nestlé’s appeal kept the case unresolved for years. His death on February 28 reignited debates on labor rights and judicial efficiency in Pakistan. Nestlé denied delaying court proceedings and maintained its right to appeal.

== Products ==
- Cerelac
- Maggi
- Nescafé
- Nestlé Milkpak
- Nestlé Everyday
- Nestlé Pure Life
- Nido

== Plants ==
Nestlé operates two multi-purpose processing plants in Sheikhupura and in Kabirwala as well as two water packaging facilities in Islamabad and in Karachi.
