= List of shopping malls in Pakistan =

This is a list of shopping malls in Pakistan. This list contains some of the most notable shopping malls in the country, each with its own unique offerings and qualities.

== Balochistan ==
=== Quetta ===
- Millennium Mall
- Gold City Mall
- Balochistan Askari Mall
- Complex of Quetta

== Islamabad Capital Territory ==
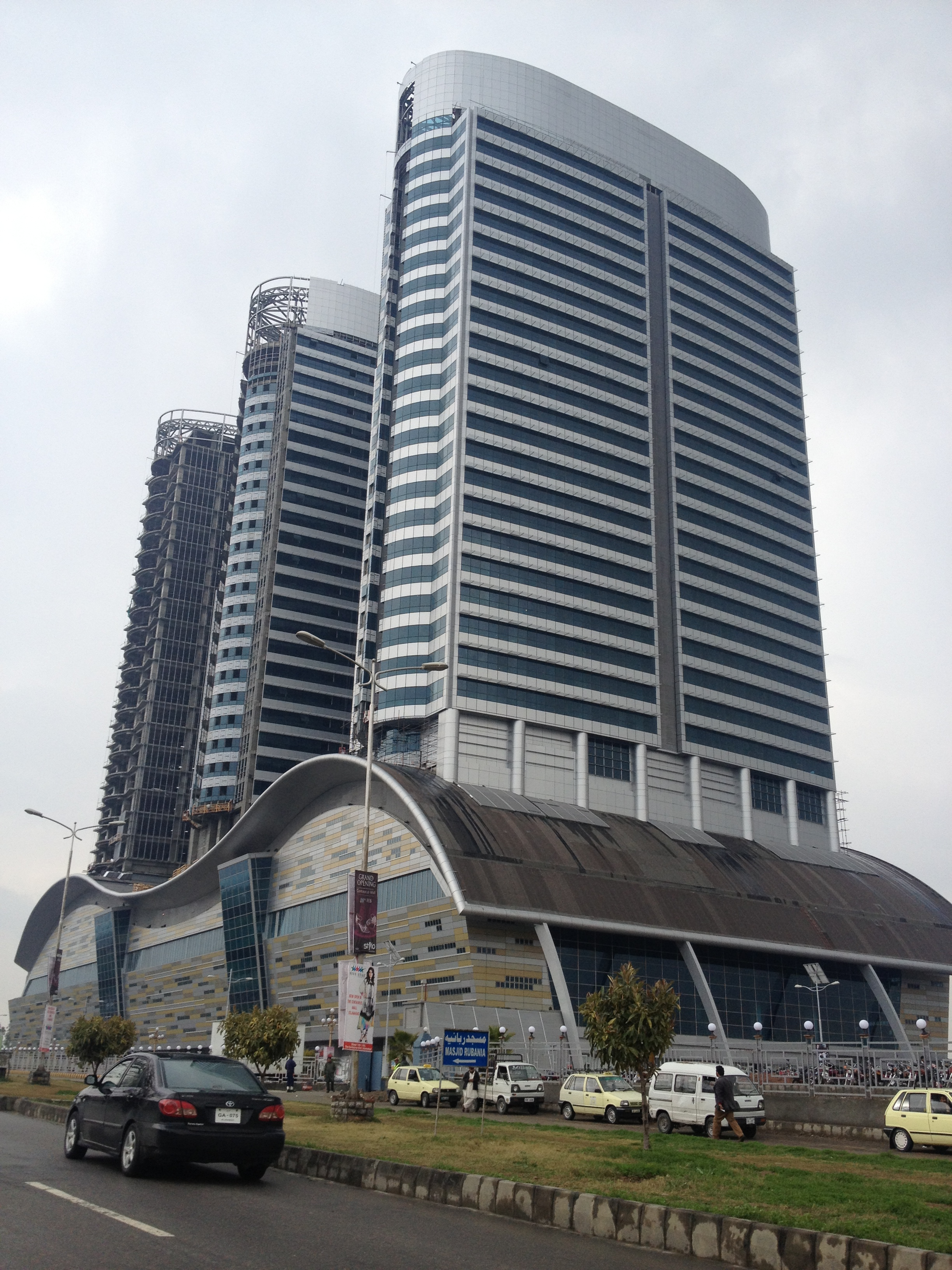
The Centaurus

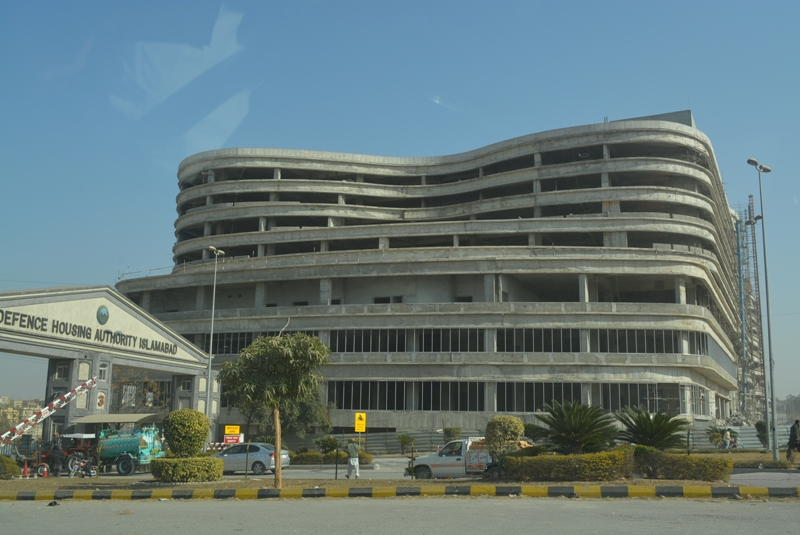
Giga Mall World Trade Center

=== Completed ===
- The Centaurus
- Giga Mall
- Safa Gold Mall
- Amazon Mall
- Imarat Builders Mall
- The Olympus

=== Under-construction/Proposed ===
- The Magnus Mall, Gulberg Islamabad
- The Sixth Boulevard, Mall & Apartment
- The Nexus Mall
- Gulberg Mall & Signature Living, Gulberg Islamabad
- Skypark One, Gulberg Islamabad
- Opal Mall
- Gulberg Arena, Gulberg Islamabad
- Gulberg Heights, Gulberg Islamabad
- Prism Heights, Gulberg Islamabad
- Gevora International Hotel & Mall, Gulberg Islamabad
- Winston Mall
- The Gate
- J7 Icon
- J7 Emporium
- Mall of Islamabad
- The Shopping Mall (TSM)
- The Aquatic Mall
- Z1(Zeta 1)Mall

== Khyber Pakhtunkhwa ==
=== Peshawar ===
- Dean’s Shopping Mall
- Afi Tower I
- Glorious Mall
- Diamond Mall
- 091 Mall
- Century Mall
- Central Mall
- Mall of Peshawar
- Mall of KPK
- Kings Mall and Hotel
- Great Wall Shopping Mall
- Marina Mall
- Al-Fatah Shopping Mall (3 Malls )
- Sheikh Yaseen Mall and Trade Center
- AH Tower
- 091 Mall
- Arbab Plaza
- Naiz Plaza
- Syed's Towers
- Al Haj Mall and Trade Center
- Millennium Mall
- Metropolis Mall
- Rabbani Mall
- City Towers
- Rahman Twin Towers
- Himalaya Complex
- Deans City Complex
- Kaur Complex
- Florenza Mall
- Saif Mall and Residency
- Afi Tower II
- Eclipse Resort Living and Mall

=== Mardan ===
- Khyber City Mall - Mardan
- The Mall of Mardan
- Max Mall Mardan
- Ocean Mall
- United Mall
- Millennium Mall Mardan
- Khaksar
- Zaman Sons

=== Swabi ===
- Khyber City Mall - Swabi

=== Mingora ===
- Swat Shopping Mall

=== Kohat ===
- Mall of Kohat

=== Dera Ismail Khan ===
- Aashiana Shopping Center
- Huzaifa Trade Center

=== Abbottabad ===
- Al-Faisal Shopping Mall
- Civic Shopping Center
- Abbot City Mall

=== Mansehra ===
- Mansehra Trade Center

=== Hangu ===
- Mall of Hangu

== Punjab ==
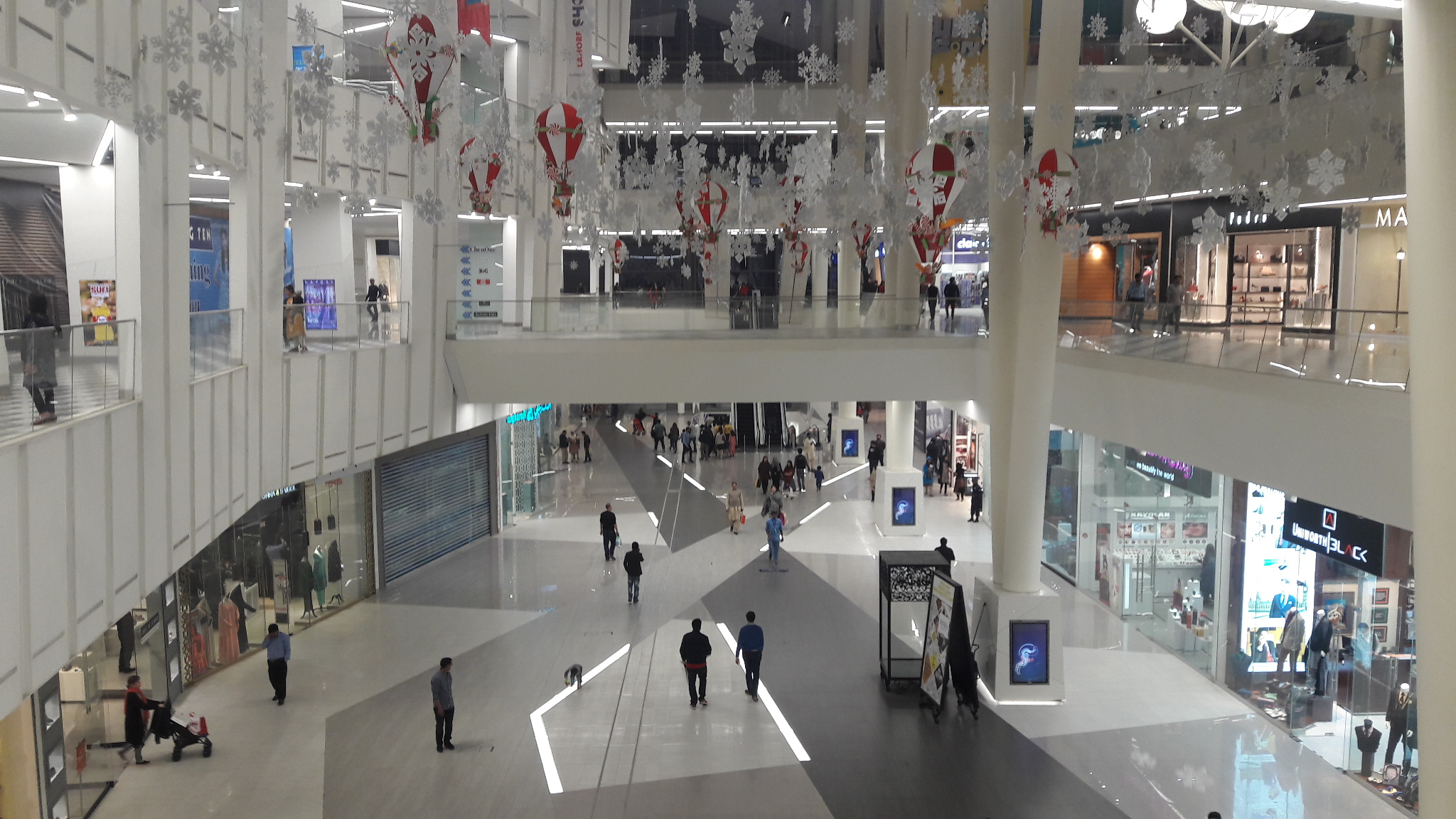
Emporium Mall, Lahore

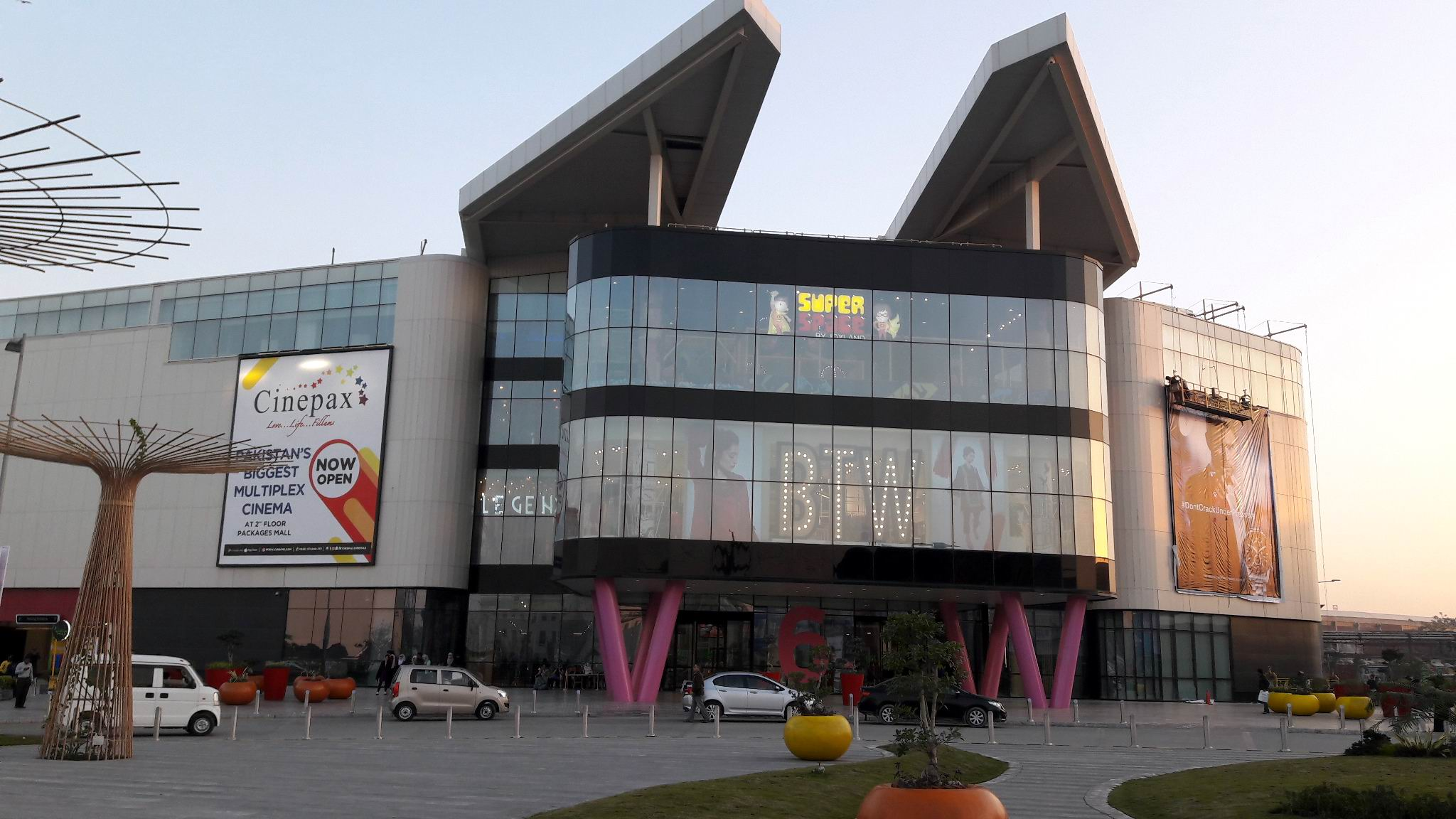
Packages Mall, Lahore

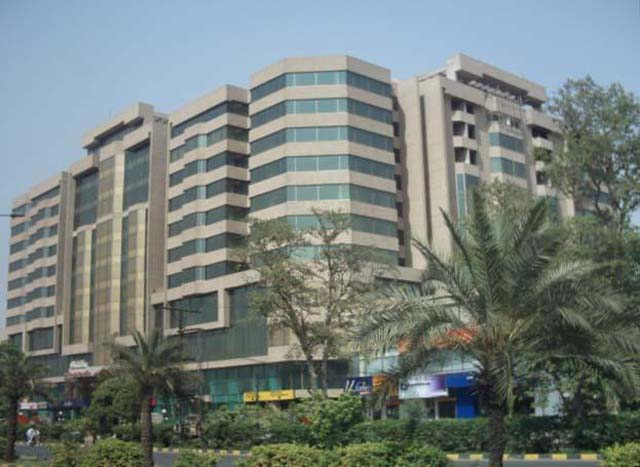
Siddiq Trade Center, Lahore

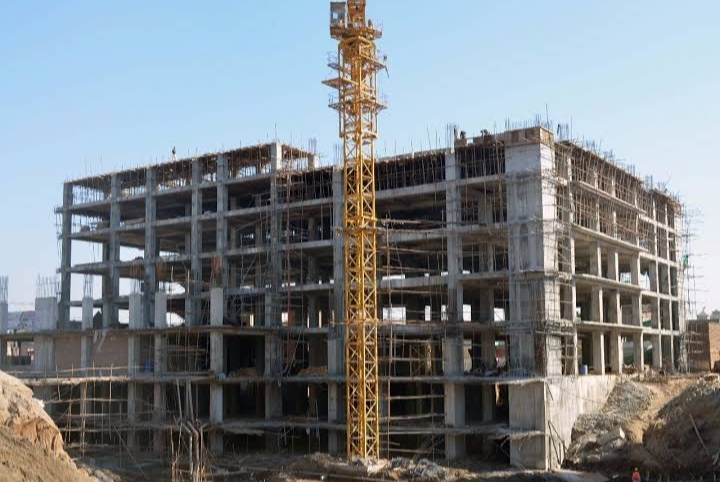
Mall of Sargodha under construction

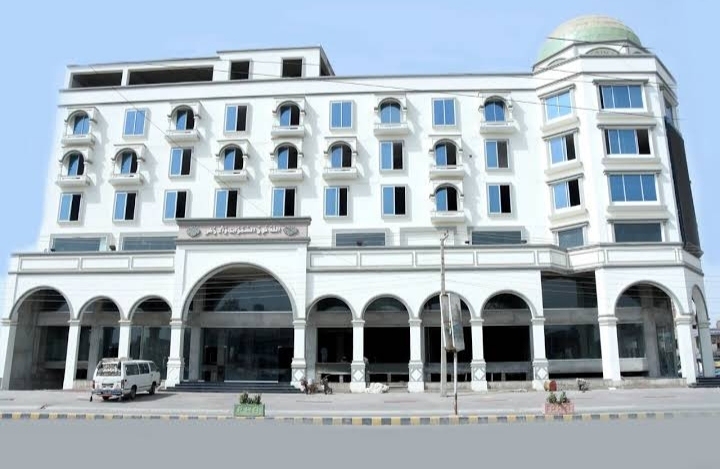
Burj Ismail Mall, Sargodha

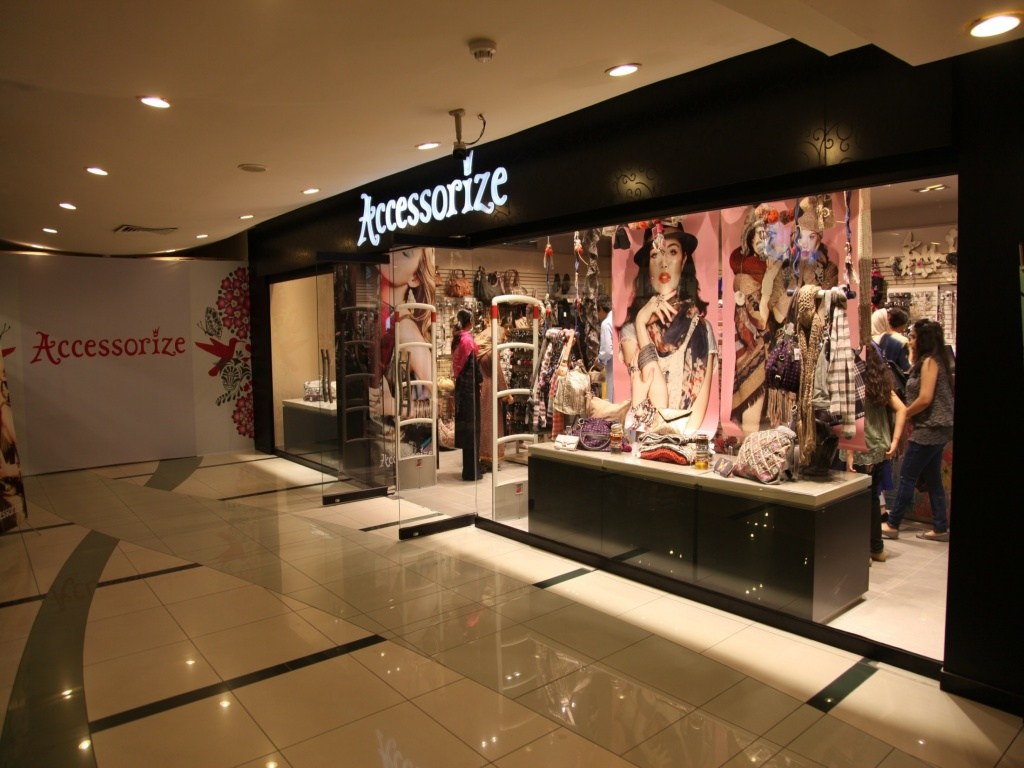
Sitara Mall, Faisalabad

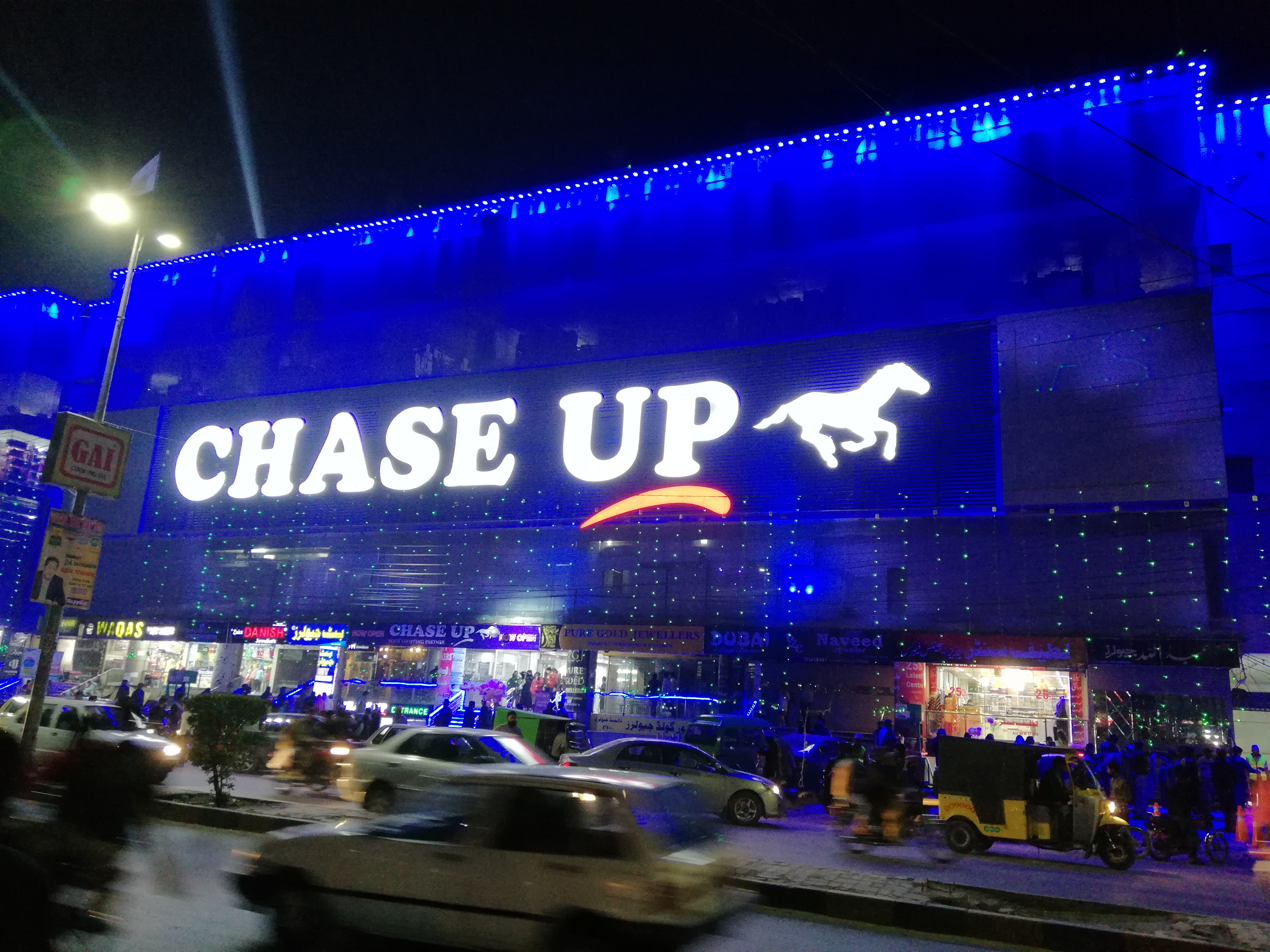
Chase Up Mall, Faisalabad

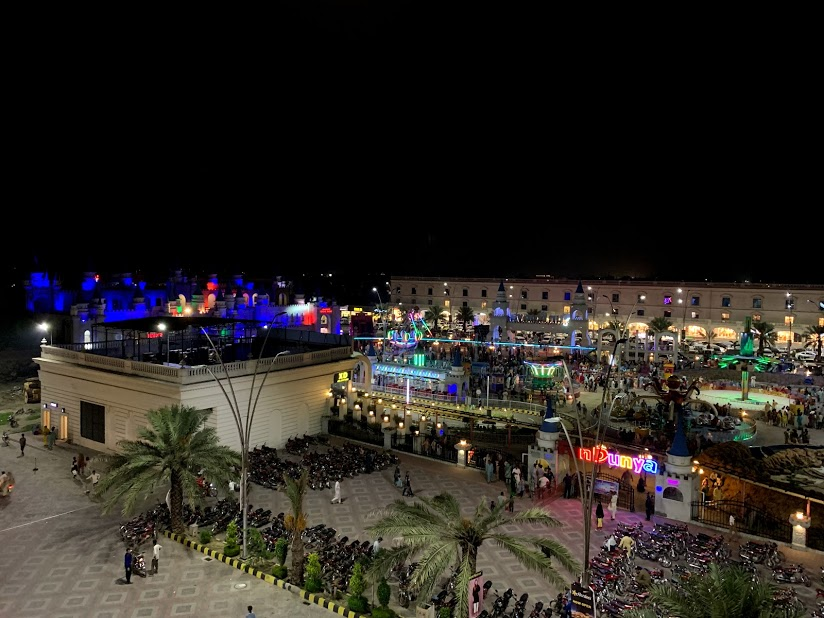
Fazal Centre Gujranwala Cantt

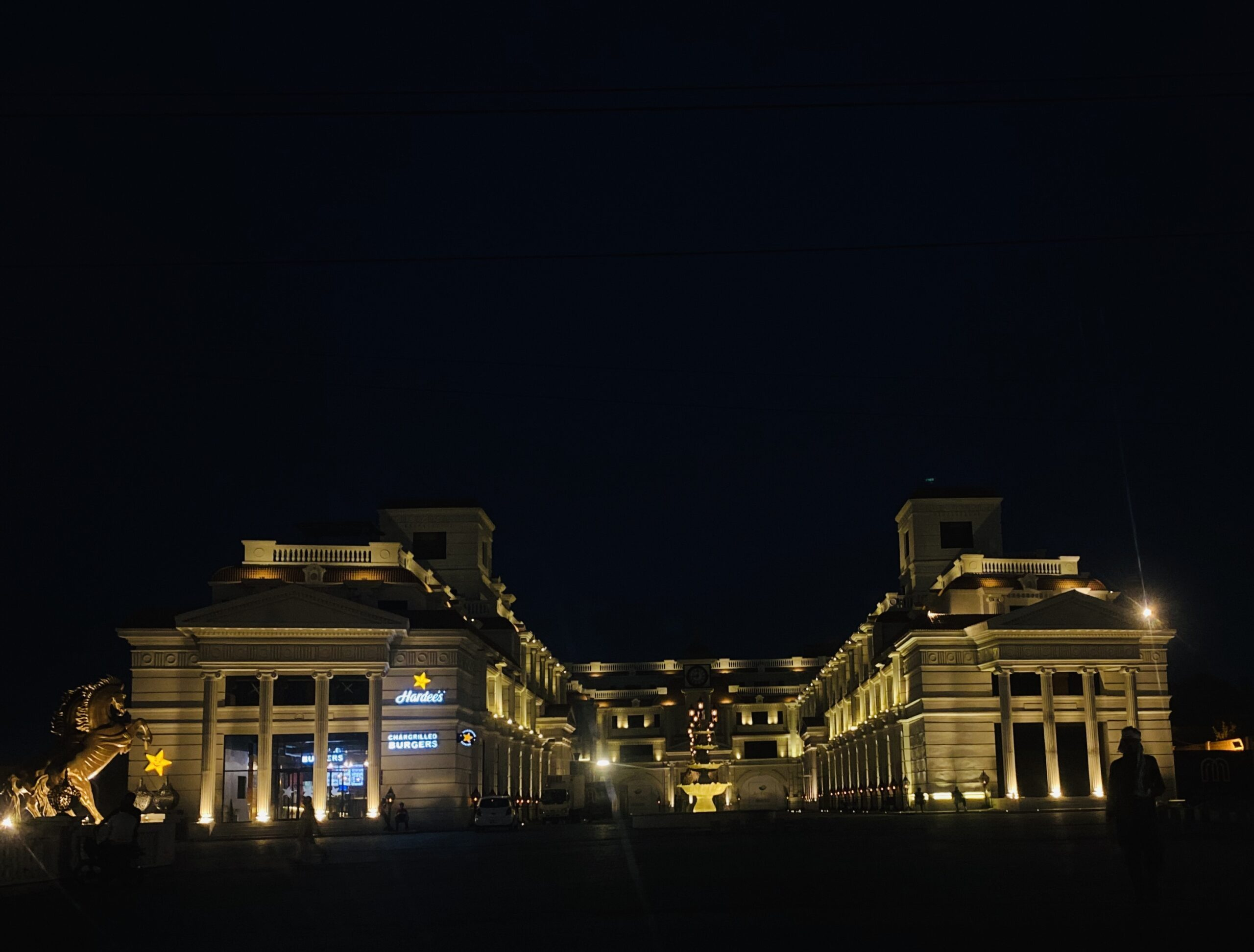
Mall of Gujranwala

=== Lahore ===
- Emporium Mall
- Packages Mall
- Fortress Square
- Mall of Lahore
- Amanah Mall
- Avenue Mall
- Xinhua Mall
- Gulberg Galleria
- Siddiq Trade Center
- Imperial Mall
- Pace Shopping Mall
- Vogue Towers
- Al Fatah Malls (3 malls)
- Dolmen Mall Lahore

=== Faisalabad ===
- Lyallpur Galleria, Faisalabad
- The Grand Central Mall, Faisalabad
- The Boulevard Mall
- Soha Mall
- The Grand Atrium Shopping Mall Faisalabad
- Sitara Mall
- Kohinoor Shopping Mall
- Do Burj Shopping Mall
- Paradise Atrium
- Pearl City Shopping Mall
- The Edge Mall
- Value Mall Mall
- Lyallpur Galleria II
- The Grand Atrium
- Chase Up Mall
- Misaq Ul Mall
- Gutwala Commercial Hub
- Al Fatah Malls (2 Malls)

=== Gujranwala ===
- Kings Mall
- Mall Of Gujranwala
- Fazal Centre
- Aleena Shopping Mall
- Prisma Mall
- Sixteenth Avenue Mall
- Civic Centre
- Nazir Centre
- Chase Up Mall
- Imtiaz Mall
- PACE Mall
- Carrefour
- MAK Mall (Under Construction)

=== Multan ===
- Mall of Multan
- United Mall Gulgasht (Under Construction)
- Centro Plaza Shopping Mall
- Crystal Mall
- Panorama Mall Multan
- Citi Mall Multan
- The United Mall
- Orient Mall
- SS Mall Multan Cantt
- Anas

=== Sargodha ===
- Mall of Sargodha
- Burj Ismail Mall
- Xin Mall
- Chenone Tower
- Burj Huraira Mall
- Al-Rehman Trade Centre
- Toheed Mall

=== Sialkot ===
- Mall of Sialkot
- Duran Shopping Mall
- City Centre Sialkot
- Kent Mall Shopping Centre
- 15 Div Shopping Centre

== Sindh ==
=== Karachi ===
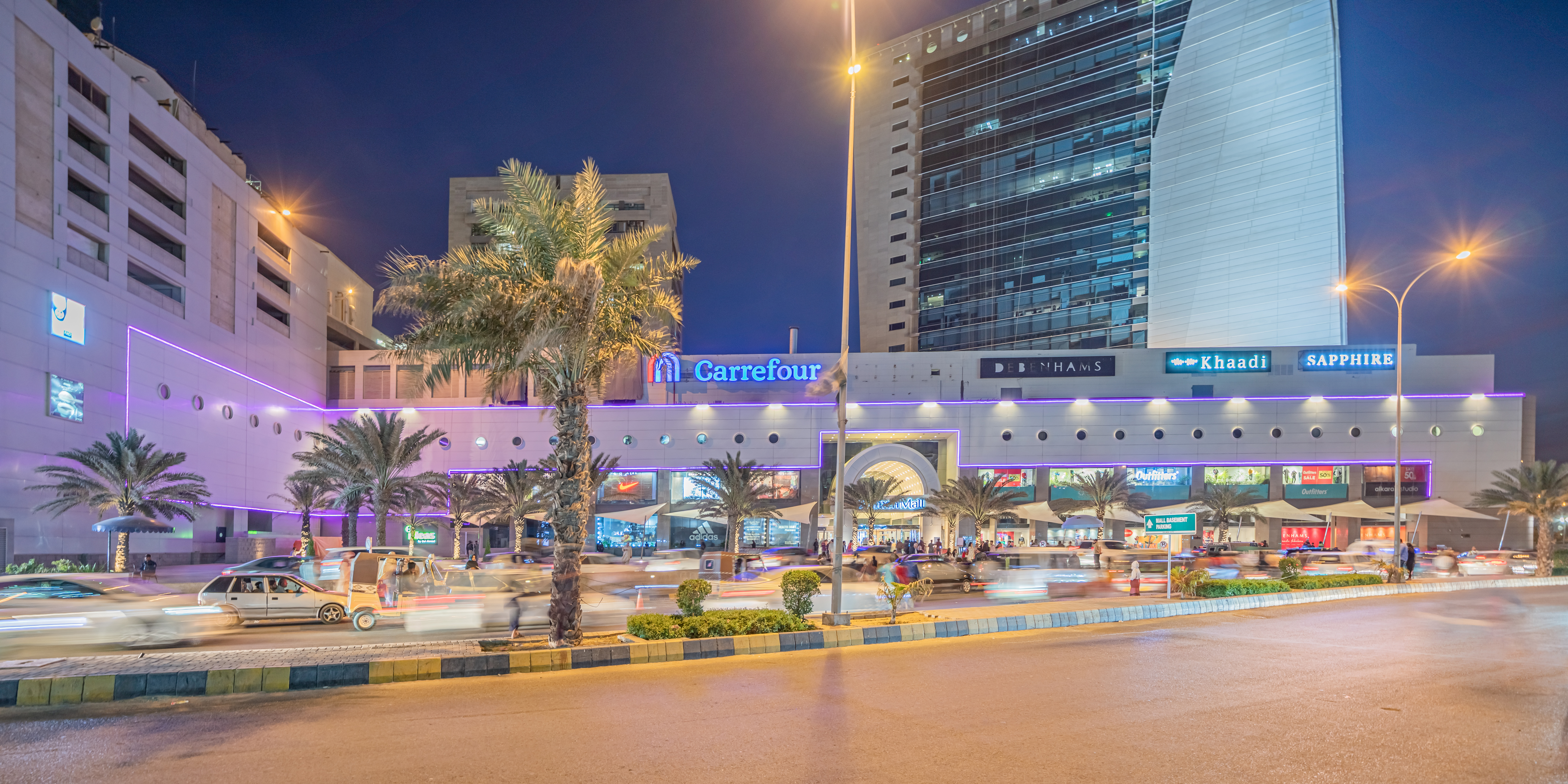
Dolmen Mall, Clifton

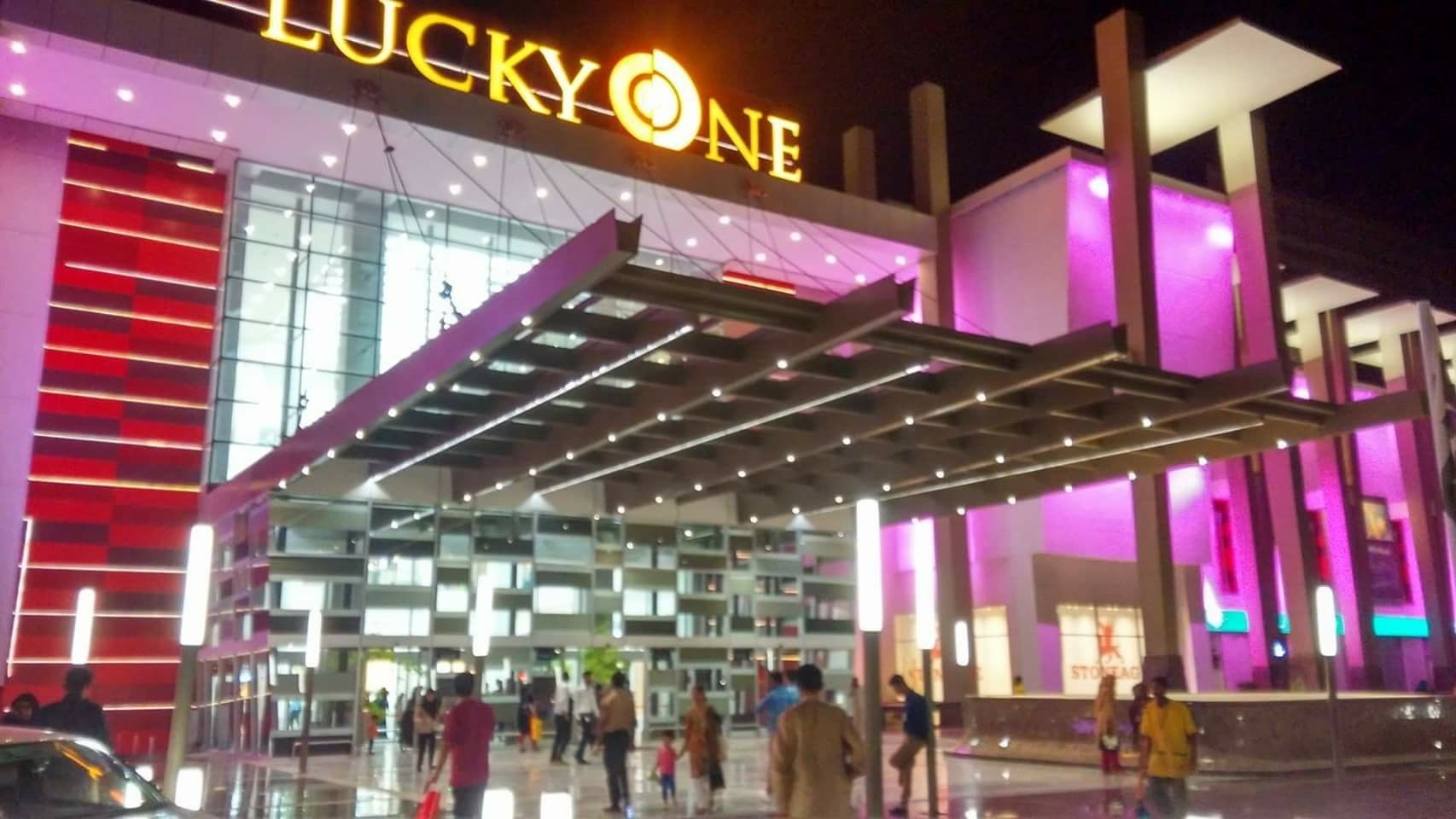
Lucky One Mall, Karachi is the largest shopping mall in Pakistan with an area of about 3.4 million square feet.

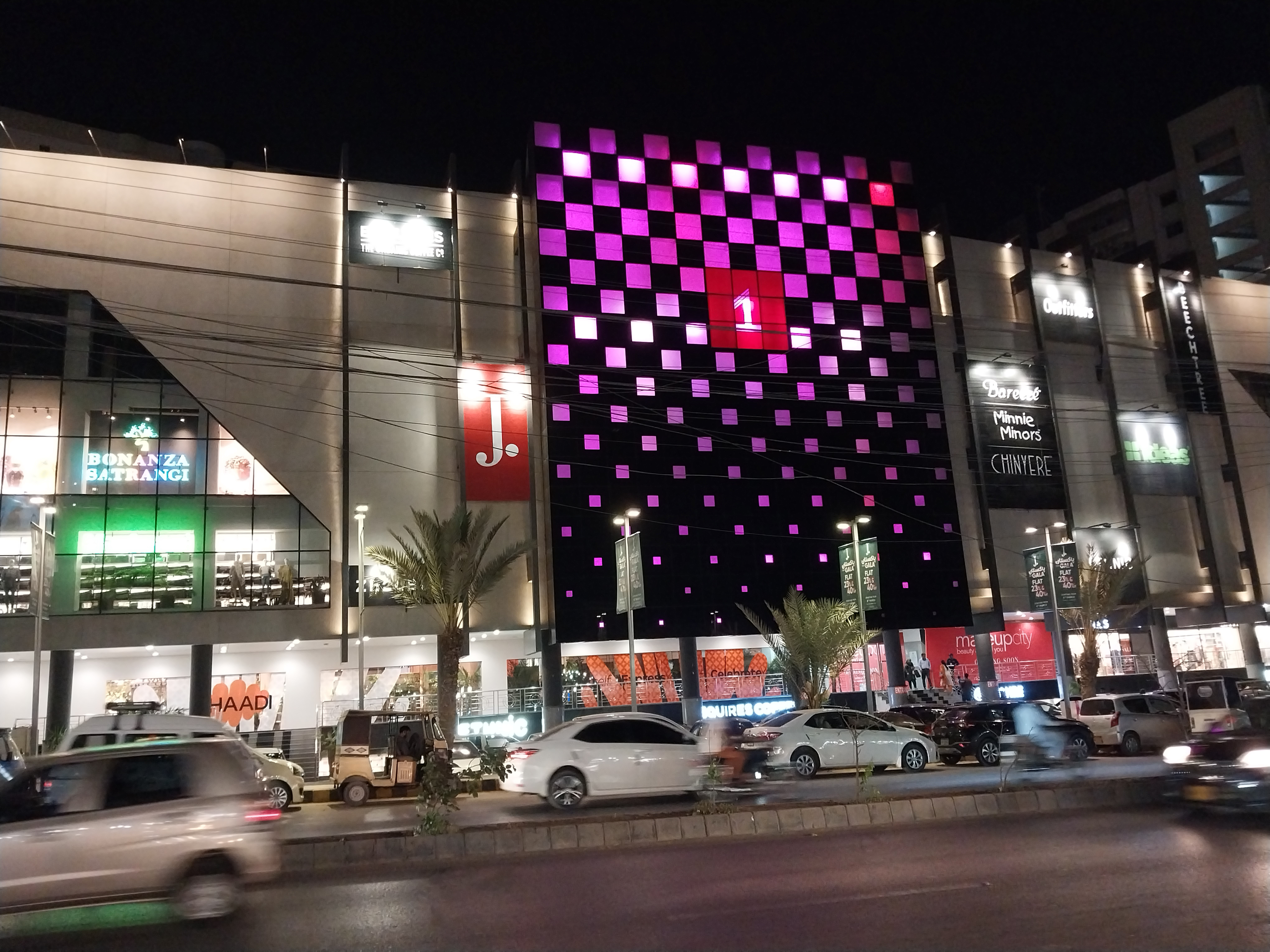
Square One Mall in Karachi

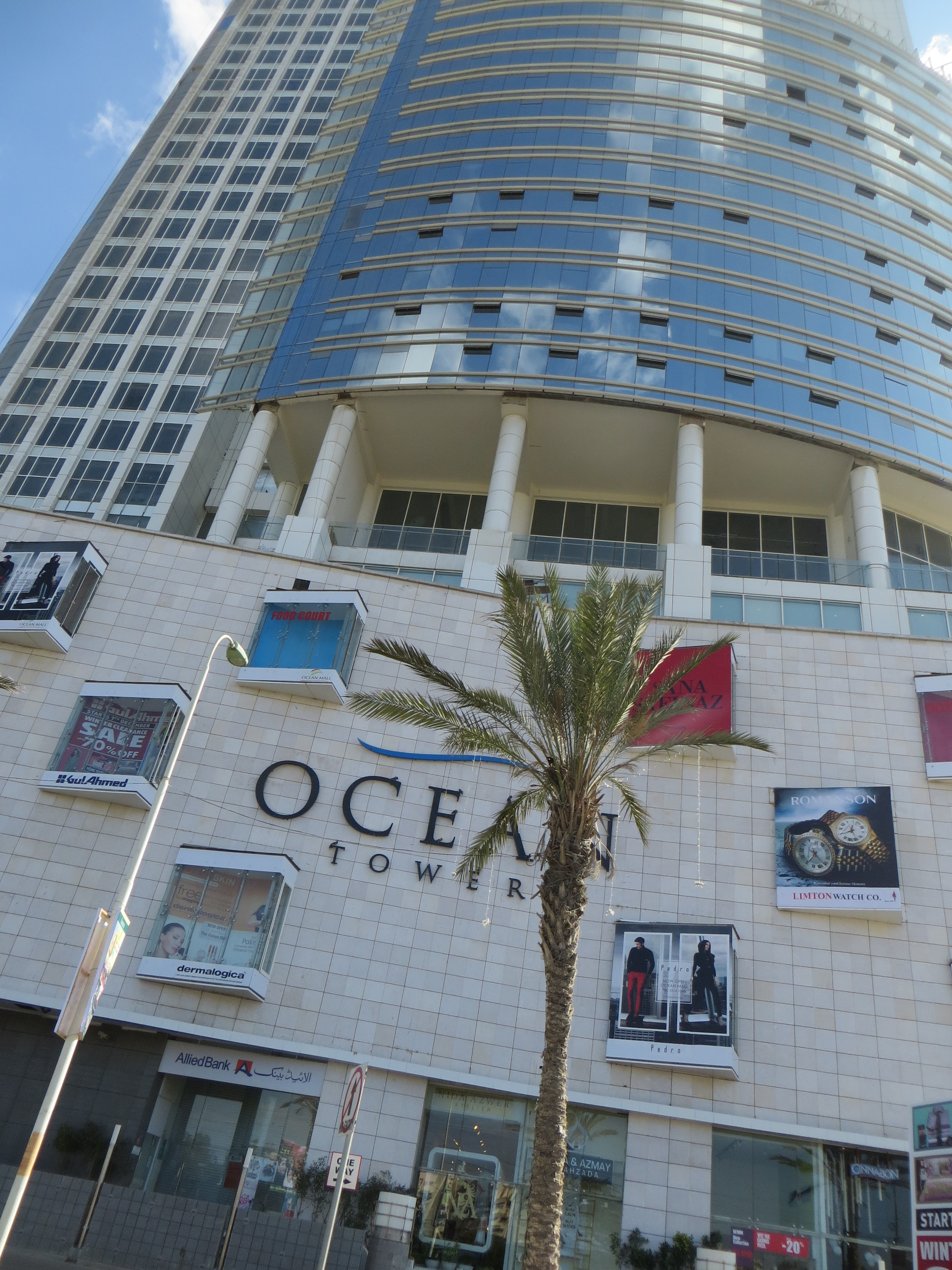
Ocean Mall and Tower

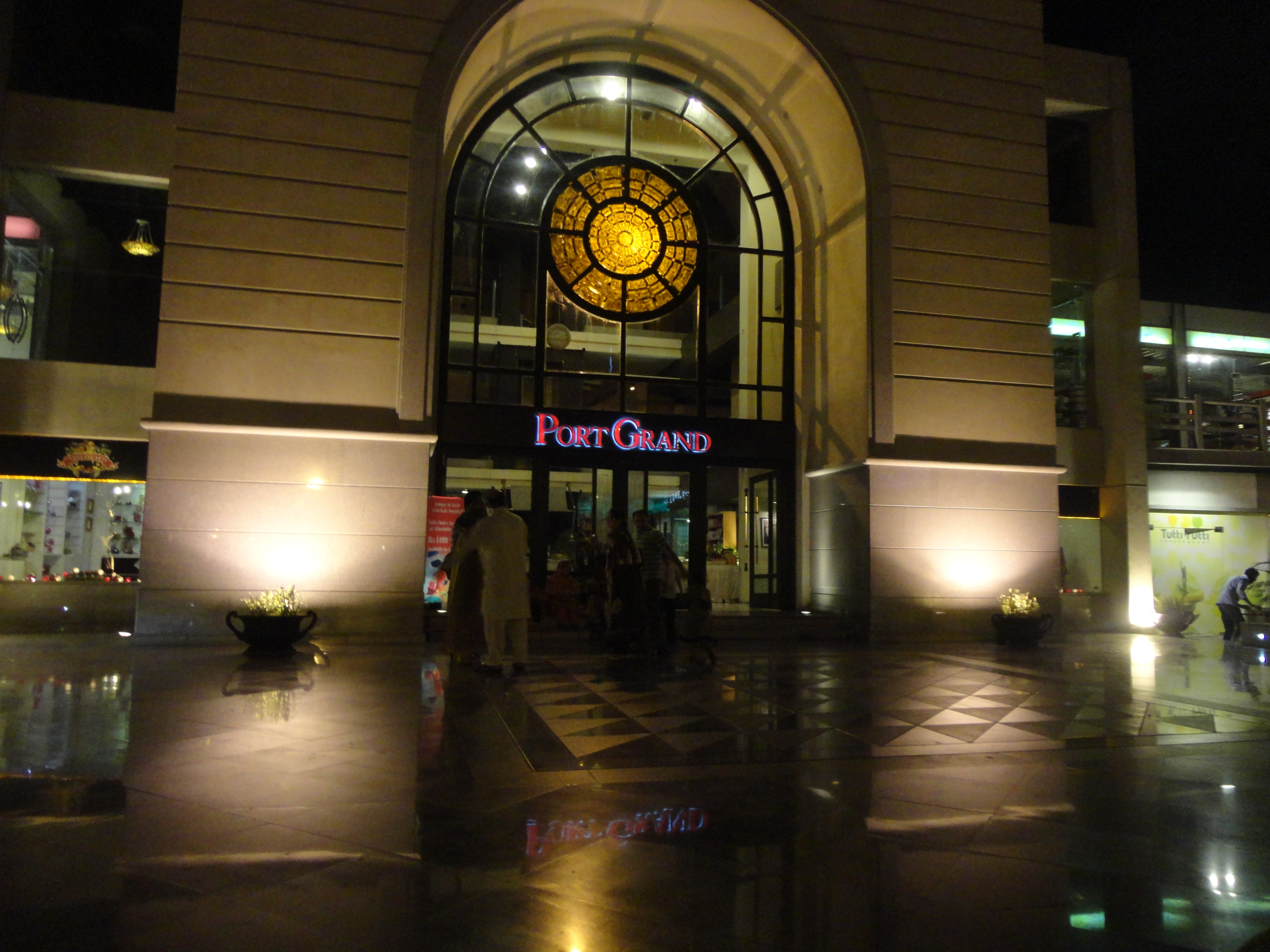
Port Grand

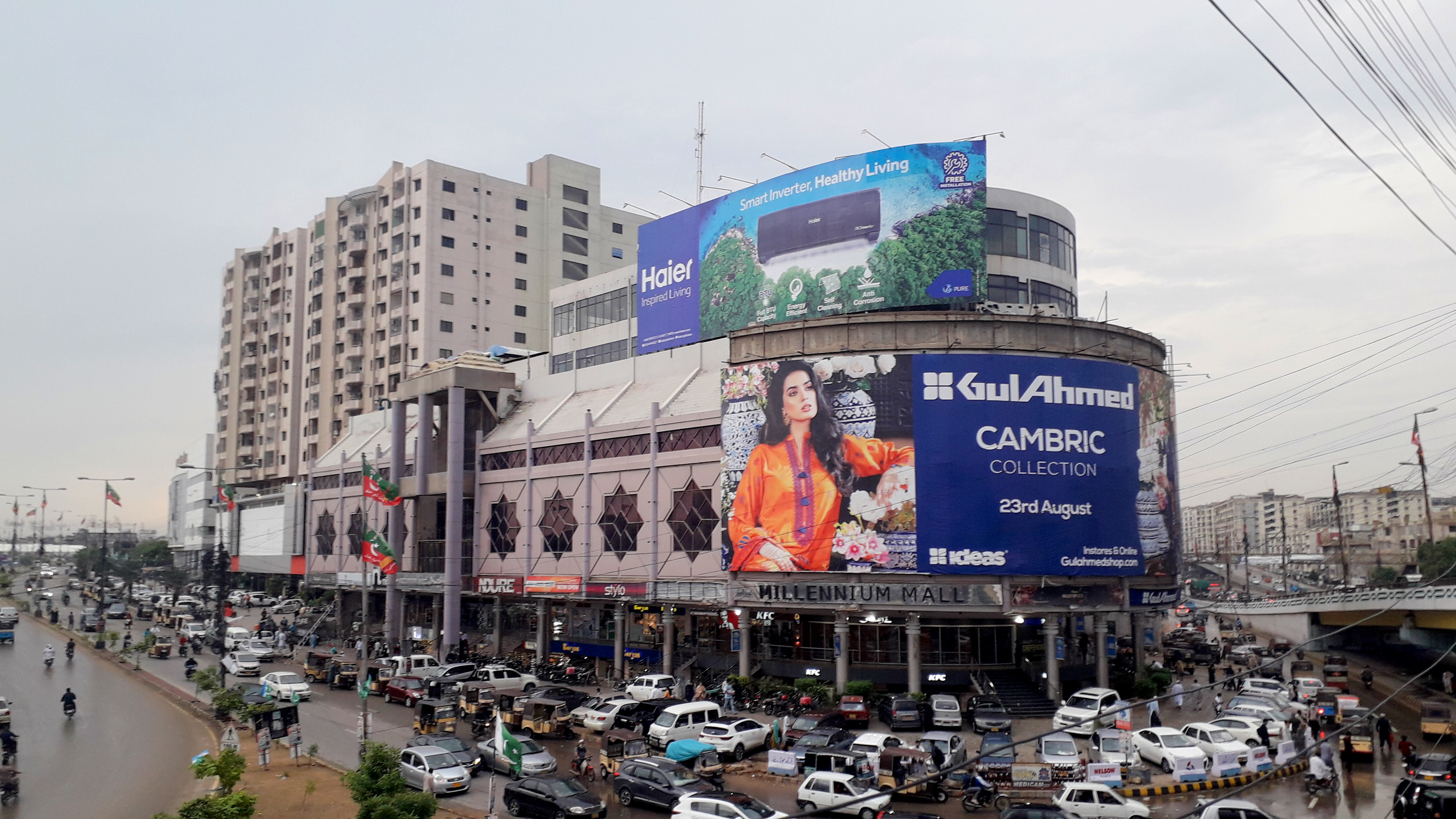
Millenium Mall
- Square One Mall
- Lucky One Mall
- Dolmen Malls
- Crescent Bay
- Ocean Mall and Tower
- Port Grand
- Omega Mall
- Millennium Mall
- Atrium Mall
- Com-3 Mall
- Star City Mall
- Glass Tower
- Saima Paari Mall
- The Place
- Park Towers
- Mall of Karachi
- Ocean Mall
- Northwalk
- Emerald Tower
- Deans Mall
- Bahria Town Tower
- The Forum Mall
- Glamour One
- Zamzama Mall
- Mashriq Centre
- The Central Shopping Mall
- Metro Shopping Mall
- Defence Mall
- Cliff Shopping Mall
- The Center
- Saima Paari Mall
- Al-Madni Mall
- Royal Defence Mall
- Vincy Mall
- Jumerah Mall
- Al Najibi Mall
- Square one
- Saima Mall
- RJ Mall Karachi
- Samama Shopping Mall
- RJ Mall
- Vincy Mall
- Dynasty Tower & Shopping Mall

=== Metropolitan Hyderabad ===
- Boulevard Mall
- Magnum Mall Hyderabad
- MallOne Shopping Complex

Hyderabad

- Emerald Mall
- Signature Tower & Mall
- Apple Tower & Mall
- Meridian Mall
- Dawood Supermarket
- Dawood Supermarket City
- Max Buchat
- National Mart
- Abdullah Mall
- Lucky Mall
- Marhaba Supermarket
- ChaseUp Hyderabad
- Orient Mall Hyderabad
- Shams Icon Mall
- Hayat Mall
- Hyderabad Icon
- Royal Empire
- Marina Mall
- Pak Tower

== See also ==
- List of largest shopping malls in the world
