= Javed Nawaz Gandapur =

Pakistani judge and jurist

Javed Nawaz Gandapur (February 17, 1943 – 2018) was a Pakistani jurist who served as a justice of the Peshawar High Court. He was one of the only two judges at the Peshawar High Court who declined to take an oath under General Pervez Musharraf's first Provisional Constitutional Order (PCO) in 2000, following the military coup in October 1999.

== Early life and education ==
Born in Mansehra, Gandapur was originally from Dera Ismail Khan. His father, Sardar Ahmad Nawaz, was a divisional forest officer. Gandapur received his early education at Army Burn Hall College in Abbottabad before transferring to Government High School Abbottabad in ninth grade. He attended Government College Abbottabad for his arts certificate and obtained a bachelor's degree from Government College Dera Ismail Khan. He earned an LLB degree from Law College, Lahore.

== Career ==
Gandapur began working as a sales officer at Packages Limited in 1966, foregoing a master's degree in administration.

In 1970, Gandapur qualified the PSC examination for judicial officers, one of five from the North-West Frontier Province (now Khyber Pakhtunkhwa) to pass that year. He commenced his judicial career in 1973 as a civil judge in Abbottabad, later serving in Mansehra and Kohat. Throughout the 1980s, he held various positions including senior civil judge, additional registrar of the Peshawar High Court, district and sessions judge, and special judge in areas such as Anti-Corruption and Labour Court.

In 1994, Gandapur was appointed as an additional judge of the Peshawar High Court, a role he held until 2000 when he was dismissed for refusing to take the PCO oath. In July 2000, he was appointed chairman of the Implementation Tribunal for Newspaper Employees, where he made decisions regarding financial distributions and employment documentation for journalists. His tenure ended in 2005 when his position was not renewed.

In 2007, during the state of emergency, Gandapur was placed under house arrest for approximately 20 days, and his residence in Hayatabad was designated as a sub-jail.
