= Syed Shahid Ali =

Pakistani business executive and former sportsperson

Syed Shahid Ali is a Pakistani business executive and former sportsperson. He is the current chairman of Loads Limited and Treet Corporation.He is also Founder of Institute of Art and Culture Lahore (A chartered University), Which he later Sold.

He played hockey, football and polo, which he also played at a national level. In 1996 he entered into the International Olympic Committee (IOC).

== Early life and education ==
Syed Shahid Ali was born in Pakistan on 29 December 1946 to Syed Wajid Ali. He studied at the University of the Punjab in Lahore and received his master in Economics in 1969. In 1970, he went to the University of Oxford, where he worked for the University’s Institute for Economics and Statistics on a project for the United Nations Conference on Trade and Development. In 1972, he received a graduate diploma in the field of economic development, and in 1973, he graduated from the University of Manchester with a degree in scientific management.

== Business career ==
After his training, Ali worked in various management positions at several companies, including from 1973 to 1976, where he was the management trainee at Coats Patons Limited in Great Britain. Later, he joined his family business, Treet Corporation and later served as the chairman of the board of the Liaquat National Hospital and the Gulab Devi Hospital in Lahore, Pakistan Red Crescent Society, and Patron-in-chief for the Government Shadab Training Institute for Mentally Challenged Children.

== Sport career ==
Syed Shahid Ali actively played polo. He was the team captain of the Oxford University polo team. As a member of the Pakistani national polo team, he played against teams from Brazil, Jordan, Nigeria, India, Australia, the USA, Iran, Brunei, South Africa and the United Kingdom in 1972. Ali has been the patron of the South Asian Wrestling Federation since 1993. In 1996 Syed Shahid Ali was elected an IOC member. Since 2008 he has also been a member of the IOC Foundation for Truce (IOTF).
