= Syed Babar Ali =

Pakistani businessman (born 1926)

Syed Babar Ali OBE

4th President of World Wide Fund
- In office 1996–1999
- Preceded by: Prince Philip, Duke of Edinburgh
- Succeeded by: Ruud Lubbers

Federal Minister for Finance (caretaker)
- In office 23 July 1993 – 19 October 1993
- President: Wasim Sajjad
- Prime Minister: Benazir Bhutto
- Preceded by: Sartaj Aziz
- Succeeded by: Benazir Bhutto

Personal details
- Born: 30 June 1926 (age 100) Lahore, Punjab, British India
- Relations: Syed Wajid Ali (brother); Syed Amjad Ali (brother)

Syed Babar Ali OBE (Urdu: سید بابر علی; born 30 June 1926) is a Pakistani businessman and philanthropist who served as caretaker finance minister of Pakistan in 1993. He is the founder of Packages Limited, Milkpak Limited (now Nestlé Pakistan), Shalamar Medical and Dental College and Lahore University of Management Sciences. Syed Babar Ali School of Science and Engineering is named after him.

== Early life and family ==
Syed Babar Ali was born on 30 June 1926, to a businessman, Syed Maratib Ali, in Lahore, Pakistan. His father owned shops in the Walled City of Lahore and was a top contractor of the British Indian Army, supplying them with services like logistics and all sorts of items used in regiments. The money was used to invest in land. His mother belonged to a prominent family of landlords from Lahore. On his maternal side, his grandmother was a member of the Afghan royal family. He had three brothers, namely Syed Amjad Ali, Syed Wajid Ali, and Syed Azfal Ali. He also had 5 sisters, namely Baji Surraya (eldest sibling), Baji Fakhra, Baji Gullo (who died before she was five), Baji Kishwar, and Baji Sarwat. His family practices Shia Islam.

He received his education from Aitchison College, Lahore. He graduated from Government College, Lahore; for further studies he went to the University of Michigan till 1947, when he moved to the newly-created state of Pakistan. He completed his graduation from University of the Punjab, Lahore. He also studied briefly at Harvard School of Business and this experience helped him later to establish a school of business studies in Lahore (LUMS).

== Career ==
In the 1970s, Zulfikar Ali Bhutto's nationalization affected five out of his six companies, leaving only Packages Limited. He served as the First and Founder Chairman of National Fertilizer Corporation of Pakistan (NFC) from 1973 until 1980, helping to set up the country's first ever fertilizer company. He did not draw any salary during his tenure as Chairman NFC.

In October 1970, Ali co-founded the Lahore Stock Exchange and served on the first Board of Directors.

Ali is the Chairman of Sanofi-Aventis Pakistan Limited, Siemens Pakistan Engineering Company Limited, and Coca-Cola Beverages Pakistan Limited.

In 1992, he founded the Ali Institute of Education for training of primary and secondary school teachers. He served as the Minister of Finance, Economic Affairs & Planning in the caretaker setup in 1993.

Ali promoted the cause of the World Wide Fund for Nature where he served in various positions, both in Pakistan and internationally, from 1972 to 1996. He was the International President of WWF from 1996 to 1999 succeeding Prince Philip, Duke of Edinburgh.

== Awards ==
Ali received honours and awards from the Government of Sweden, the Government of Netherlands, an Order of the British Empire from Britain (1997), and was awarded an Honorary Doctorate Degree of Laws from McGill University, Montreal, Canada (1997).

Political offices
Preceded by Sartaj Aziz	Finance Minister of Pakistan; 1993	Succeeded by Benazir Bhutto (never held post)
