= Loads Limited =

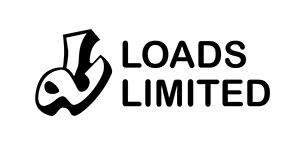
- Company type: Public
- Traded as: PSX: LOADS
- Industry: Automobile
- Founded: 1979; 47 years ago
- Founder: Syed Shahid Ali
- Headquarters: Karachi, Pakistan
- Area served: Pakistan
- Key people: Munir K. Bana (CEO); Syed Shahid Ali (chairman)
- Revenue: ▼ Rs. 4.493 billion (US$16 million) (2023)
- Operating income: ▼ Rs. -867.658 million (US$−3.1 million) (2023)
- Net income: ▼ Rs. -1.798 billion (US$−6.4 million) (2023)
- Total assets: ▼ Rs. 6.844 billion (US$24 million) (2023)
- Total equity: ▼ Rs. 2.165 billion (US$7.7 million) (2023)
- Owner: Syed Shahid Ali (37.67%); Treet Corporation (12.49%)
- Number of employees: 382 (2023)
- Parent: Ali Group
- Subsidiaries: Specialized Motorcycles (100%); Multiple Autoparts Industries (92%); Specialized Autoparts Industries (91%); Hi–Tech Alloy Wheels (80%)
- Website: loads-group.pk
- Footnotes / references Financials As of 30 June 2023

Loads Limited is a Pakistani autoparts maker based in Karachi. It manufactures exhaust systems, mufflers, radiators and sheet metal components.

== History ==
Loads Limited was founded in 1979.

In 2016, Loads was listed on the Pakistan Stock Exchange, following an initial public offering (IPO) at a strike price of Rs 35 and raised Rs 1.7 billion.

In 2018, Loads began manufacturing alloy wheels at its plant in Port Bin Qasim, Karachi. The used plant was procured from Australia and has capacity to 500,000 wheels per year.

== Production ==
Loads have three manufacturing plants located in Korangi and Port Bin Qasim in Karachi.

== Products ==
- Radiator
- Muffler
- Sheet metal components

== Subsidiaries ==
- Specialized Autoparts Industries Limited (100%)
- Multiple Autoparts Industries Limited (92%)
- Specialized Motorcycles Limited (91%)
- Hi–Tech Alloy Wheels (80%)
