= J7 Emporium =

- جی۷ امپوریم

General information
- Status: Under construction
- Type: Mixed-use
- Location: B-17, Islamabad
- Groundbreaking: 2020

Technical details
- Floor count: 31

Design and construction
- Architect: Ahmad Riaz Associates
- Developer: J7 Group

J7 Emporium is a high-rise mixed-use development under construction in Islamabad, Pakistan. The project consists of a 31-storey structure spanning approximately 2.33 hectares (5.75 acres). Upon completion, it would be the tallest and largest shopping mall in Islamabad.

== Overview ==
The project was announced by J7 Group, a real estate developer based in Islamabad, in 2020. Construction began the same year. It was designed by Ahmad Riaz Associates (ARA).

Located in Block C, Sector B-17 in Islamabad, the complex includes a shopping mall, food court, hotel suites, office spaces, and residential apartments. The structure includes a rooftop infinity pool and a glass-floored skywalk on the 17th floor.

In March 2023, Radisson Hotel Group announced the opening of the Radisson Hotel Islamabad, a 165-room facility located within the J7 Emporium complex.

In December 2024, J7 Emporium signed a development agreement with the Special Technology Zones Authority (STZA) to establish and operate a special technology zone named Tech 7 within the complex.

As of 2025, the complex remains under construction.

== See also ==
- List of shopping malls in Pakistan
