= World Trade Center Islamabad =

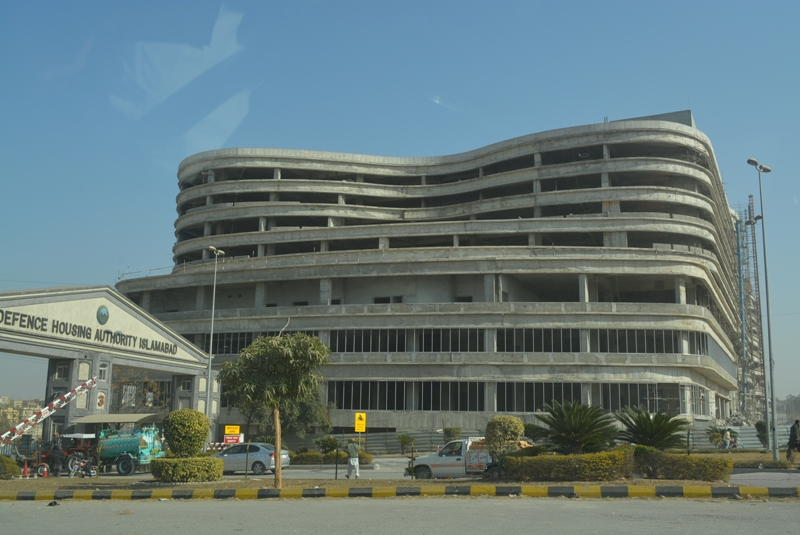
- Location: Islamabad, Pakistan

World Trade Center Islamabad is a mixed-use 14 story development located on GT Road, DHA, Islamabad, Pakistan. It is affiliated with the World Trade Centers Association.Also known as Giga Mall.

The development includes a five-story shopping mall, a six-story office tower and a 267-room four-star hotel. The project is owned by the multinational organization Giga Group.

The complex opened on August 17, 2016.

== Design ==
The WTC Islamabad building was initially intended to be a 5 Towers High Rise Building. However, the design was later changed to a Low Rise Single Tower Building. The conceptual design of the building came from the British architectural firm Atkins. The detailed design was done by Arch Vision Plus.

== Construction ==
Groundbreaking for construction of WTC Islamabad took place on 21 January 2008. The project was contracted to a joint consortium of IJM Gulf Malaysia, Mazyood Giga International, and NESPAK. Extensive use of prefabricated components under the supervision of Structure Designer Mr. Orangzaib Alam Khan helped speed up the construction process.
