= Packages Mall =

Shopping mall in Walton, Lahore, Pakistan

- مرکز خرید پیکیجز
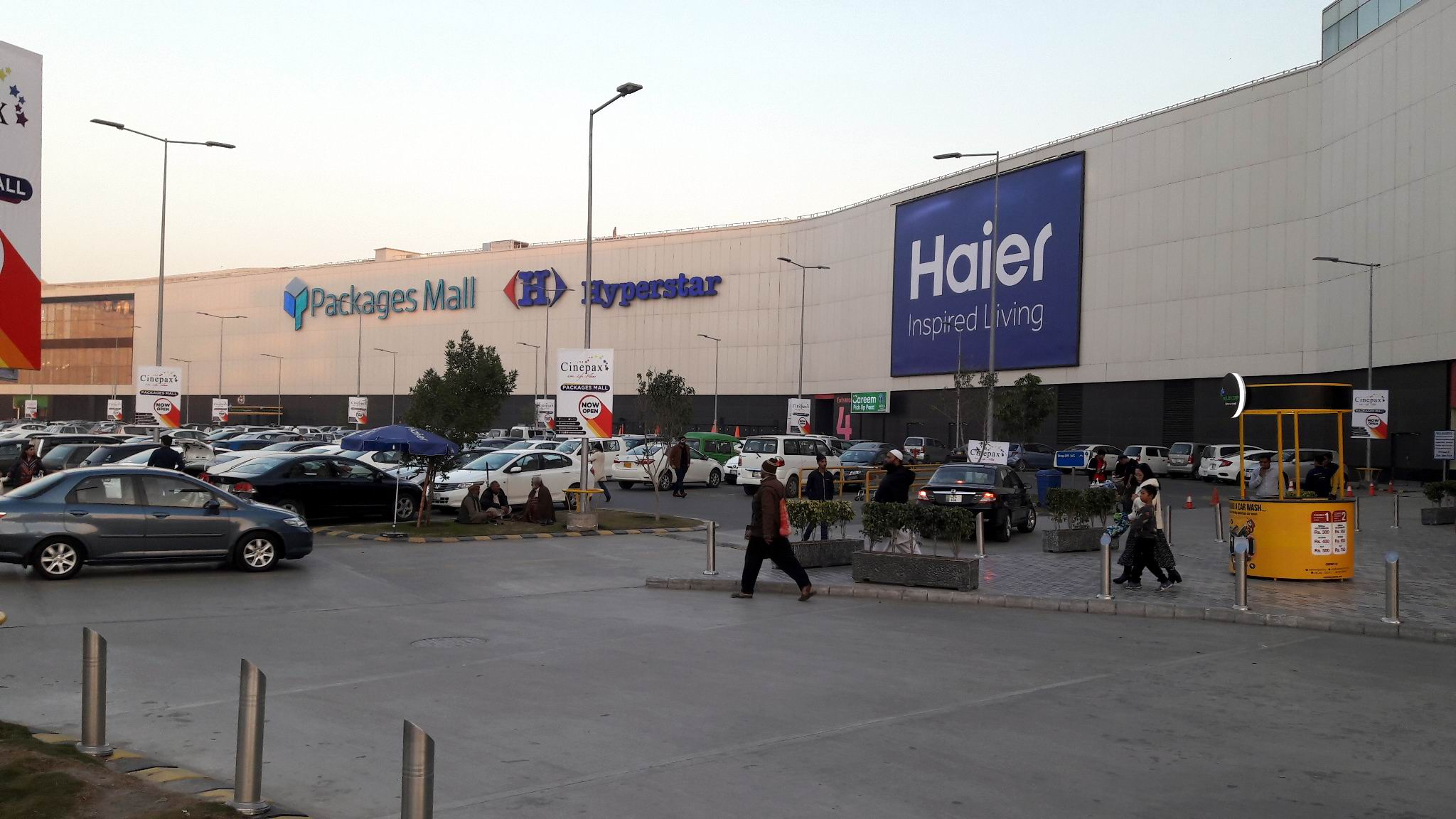
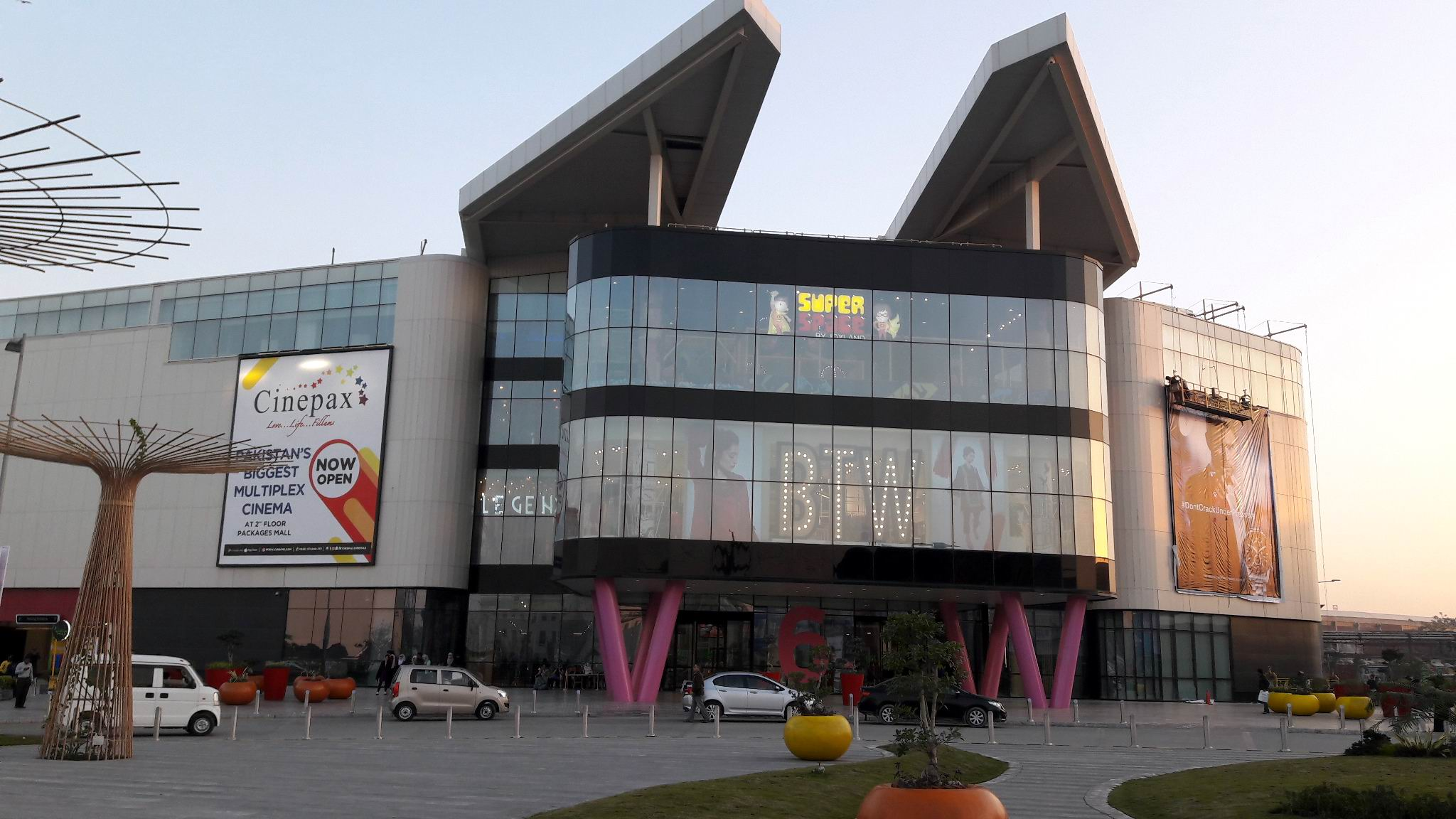
- Packages Mall, Lahore
- Coordinates: 31°28′17″N 74°21′22″E
- Address: Walton, Lahore-54760, Pakistan
- Opened: 2017; 9 years ago
- Owner: Packages Limited
- Num. of stores: 200+
- Floors: 3
- Website: packagesmall.com

Packages Mall is a shopping mall located in Lahore, Pakistan. It is one of the largest malls in Pakistan.

The mall is managed by Packages Real Estate (Pvt.) Limited (PREL), a subsidiary of Packages Limited, which also oversees the development of office spaces adjacent to the mall.

In 2024, the mall had a revenue of PKR 6.01 billion ($21.1 million USD).

== Retail outlets ==
- Charles & Keith
- Dockers
- L'Occitane en Provence
- Khaadi
- Junaid Jamshed
- Sana Safinaz
- Sapphire
- Ideas by Gul Ahmed
- Levi's
- Carrefour

== See also ==
- List of shopping malls in Pakistan
