= LuckyOne Mall =

Shopping mall located in Pakistan

- مرکز خرید لکی ون

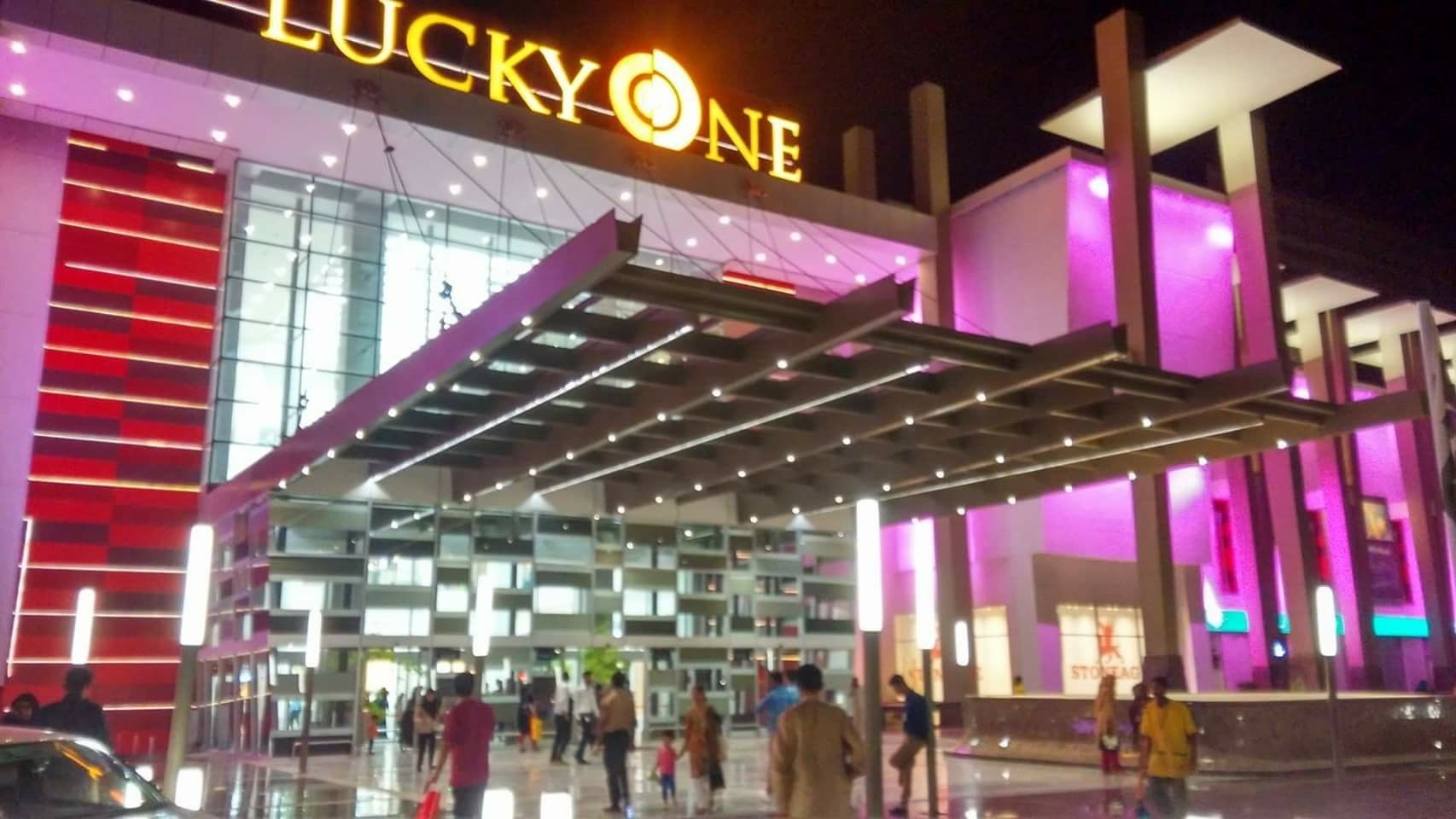
- Lucky One Mall in Karachi
- Location: Karachi, Sindh, Pakistan
- Coordinates: 24°55′56″N 67°05′14″E
- Address: Opposite UBL Sports Complex, Rashid Minhas Road
- Opened: 6 May 2017
- Developer: Lucky Landmark (Pvt) Ltd.
- Manager: Lucky One (Private) Ltd.
- Owner: Yunus Brothers Group
- Architect: Arcop (Pvt.) Ltd.
- Num. of stores: 200+
- Num. of anchor tenants: 2
- Floor area: 320,000 m^{2} (3,400,000 sq ft)
- Floors: 10
- Parking: 1200 spaces
- Public transit: People Bus Service routes on Rashid Minhas Road
- Website: luckyone.com.pk

The LuckyOne Mall is a shopping mall located in Karachi, Sindh, Pakistan, which is owned by Yunus Brothers Group. It is the largest shopping mall in Pakistan, with 320,000 m^{2} (3,400,000 sq ft) of gross leasable area.

== History ==
LuckyOne Mall was constructed on the land originally owned by Fazal Textile Mills, a listed company which was acquired by the Yunus Brother Group in 1987. The mill specialized in producing cotton ring-spun yarn and was located in the industrial estate of Federal B. Area. As the population of Karachi increased, the land of the mill became part of the city and its real estate value increased. Due to this reason, on October 8, 2008, Fazal Textile Mills decided to relocate its production facility to Nooriabad, near the Super Highway, and construct a mega mall and luxurious residential towers on the existing land of the mill.

In 2010, the Lucky One Mall Project was conceived as a joint venture between Lucky Textile Mills and Fazal Textile Mills. To manage the construction, development, and maintenance of the project, a special purpose vehicle (SPV) named Lucky One (Private) Limited was formed in August 2010, following shareholder approval. In September 2014, the shareholders of Lucky Landmark and Fazal Textile Mills decided to dissolve Fazal Textile Mills by merging the Lucky One Project with Lucky Landmark (Private) Limited and integrating Fazal's textile operations with Gadoon Textiles Limited.

In 2017, the mall was opened to the public.

== Facilities ==
It also includes an atrium, brand outlets and food court. The mall also features the indoor theme park Onederland, which consists of over 200 attractions across 2 levels.

It includes Carrefour, a large hypermarket offering a large variety of different grocery, household & electronic items. There are other brands like Hush Puppies, Travel Mate, Servis Shoes, Stylo Shoes, Sputnik Footwear, Interwood Mobel, Bata Corporation, Gree Electric and more.

== See also ==
- List of shopping malls in Pakistan
- List of tallest buildings in Karachi
