= Liaquat National Hospital =

Hospital in Karachi, Pakistan

Coordinates: 24°54′N 67°04′E

Liaquat National Hospital & Medical College

Geography
- Location: Karachi, Pakistan

Organisation
- Care system: Private
- Type: Teaching

Services
- Standards: ISO 9001:2000
- Beds: 700

History
- Founded: 1958 as National Hospital; Renamed later as Liaquat National Hospital

Links
- Website: https://www.lnh.edu.pk/
- Lists: Hospitals in Pakistan

The Liaquat National Hospital is located at Stadium Road, Karachi, Sindh, Pakistan.

== History ==
Soon after Independence the Red Cross Fete Committee, which was chaired by Syed Wajid Ali, raised about PKR 800,000 through meena bazaars organized under the guidance of Rana Liaquat Ali Khan. At a meeting chaired by Khan, the committee decided to establish a national hospital in Karachi, Pakistan. Malik Ghulam Muhammad, the governor-general of Pakistan, laid the foundation stone of the hospital on 23 February 1953. After completion, president of Pakistan, Iskander Mirza, inaugurated it on 16 October 1958.

In memory of Nawabzada Liaquat Ali Khan, the first Prime Minister of Pakistan who was assassinated in 1951, the national hospital was renamed later as Liaquat National Hospital.

Syed Wajid Ali was selected as the president of a committee of citizens, philanthropists, technocrats and government functionaries on November 5, 1958, and remained so till his death in 2008.

In 1978, the institute entered into the field of education. Today, it trains students at a medical college and at schools of nursing, physiotherapy and rehabilitation, medical technology, diagnostic laboratory sciences, and speech therapy. It offers technical courses in a spectrum of services.

As of 2026, the hospital has 700 beds and 30 medical and surgical services, providing diagnostic and therapeutic facilities. The hospital has a residency training program, representing a majority of the existing disciplines.

== Recognition ==
Liaquat National Hospital was recognised for fellowship by the College of Physicians and Surgeons Pakistan, including disciplines which are also recognised by the Royal Colleges in the UK.

== Departments ==
The hospital has MRI machines, pathology laboratory facilities, additional Executive II and III Wards, CCU, MICU, dialysis machines and ventilators. An operation theatre, intensive care unit. and transplant unit complex are under construction.

=== Clinical departments ===
- Medical and allied
  - Cardiology
  - Chest medicine
  - Dermatology
  - Diabetes, endocrinology, and metabolism
  - Gastroenterology
  - General medicine
  - Nephrology
  - Neurology
  - Oncology
  - Paediatric medicine
  - Psychiatry
  - Rheumatology
- Surgical and allied
  - Accident and emergency (trauma patients treatment)
  - Anesthesia and clinical care
  - Breast diseases
  - Cardiothoracic surgery
  - Dentistry and maxillofacial surgery
  - E.N.T head and neck surgery
  - Gynaecology and obstetrics
  - General surgery
  - Ophthalmology
  - Orthopedic surgery
  - Plastic and reconstructive surgery
  - Pediatrics surgery
  - Spinal and neurosurgery
  - Urology
  - Vascular surgery
- Diagnostics
  - Biochemistry
  - Haematology and blood bank
  - Histopathology
  - Laboratory collection center
  - Microbiology
  - Molecular pathology
  - Radiology
- Other clinical departments
  - Pharmacy
  - Physical therapy and rehab

=== Basic sciences ===
- Anatomy
- Biochemistry
- Community medicine
- Forensic medicine
- Physiology
- Pathology and microbiology
- Pharmacology and therapeutics

=== Other services ===
- Academic council
- Health information management services
- Nutrition and food services
- Medical education
- Social services department

=== Facilities ===
- Mosque
- Day care centre
- Home health services
- Library
- Rehabilitation
- Research and skills development centre
- Fitness center
- Sports ground
