= Packages Limited =

Pakistani packaging and investment holding company

- Native name: پیکیجز محدود
- Type: Public
- Traded as: PSX: PKGS; KSE 100 component
- Industry: Packaging
- Founded: 1956; 70 years ago in Lahore
- Founder: Syed Babar Ali
- Headquarters: Lahore-54760, Pakistan
- Key people: Syed Hyder Ali (CEO)
- Products: Tissue paper, flexible packaging, folding cartons, paper & board and corrugated packaging
- Net income: ▼ Rs. −2.845 billion (US$−10 million) (2024)
- Total equity: ▼ Rs. 70.222 billion (US$250 million) (2024)
- Owner: IGI Investments (29.90%); Babar Ali Foundation (11.1%); Syed Hyder Ali (5.45%)
- Number of employees: 193 (2024)
- Parent: IGI Group
- Subsidiaries: Bulleh Shah Packaging (100%); Packages Convertors Limited (100%); StarchPack Limited (100%); Packages Lanka (79.07%); Packages Mall (75.16%); Tri-Pack Films Limited (69.26%); OmyaPack Limited (50%); Hoechst Pakistan (41.07%); IGI Holdings (10.54%); Nestle Pakistan (8.05%)
- Website: packages.com.pk
- Footnotes; Financials as of 31 December 2024

Packages Limited, commonly known as Packages Group, is a Pakistani packaging and investment holding company headquartered in Lahore. It manufactures folding cartons, flexible packaging, paper and paperboard, tissue products and corrugated packaging, and holds investments in subsidiaries and associates across the packaging, real estate, pharmaceutical, food, ink, films and power sectors.

Packages was founded in 1956. It is listed on the Pakistan Stock Exchange.

== History ==
=== 1956–1982: Early history ===
Packages Limited was established in 1956 as a joint venture between the Ali Group of Pakistan and Akerlund & Rausing of Sweden to convert paper and paperboard into packaging for the consumer industry. The company was founded by Syed Babar Ali, who had proposed the partnership during a visit to Sweden, with the aim of reducing the country's dependence on imported packaging materials. It was aimed to reduce the family group's dependence on imported packaging materials, especially for their razor blade operations of Treet Corporation. The partnership was recommended by the Pakistan Tobacco Company (PTC), which vouched for the Swedish firm's reliability and interest in international expansion. The approval for the joint venture from the Government of Pakistan was granted after nearly two years, with construction beginning in late 1956.

The ownership structure initially allocated 77.31 percent of the equity to the Ali family, with the remaining 22.69 percent going to the Swedish firm in exchange for technical expertise, managerial assistance, and the supply of European machinery necessary for starting operations. Additionally, the contract included a clause for ongoing technical assistance, providing the Swedish partners with an annual payment of $35,000 through 1976. During the first three years, 22 Swedish experts were involved in the project. By 1974, Akerlund & Rausing's equity had been diluted to 14 percent, following the issuance of new shares to raise capital starting in 1965.

By 1960, Packages Limited had expanded its workforce to accommodate an additional shift, resulting in a doubling of its output by 1964 compared to 1957. Initially, the Pakistan Tobacco Company (PTC) constituted about 80 percent of Packages' business in its inaugural year; this figure had decreased to 12 percent by 1974. Over this period, the company's annual sales growth averaged 15 percent since 1968, reaching PKR 150 million by 1974. The workforce transitioned entirely to local Pakistani employees as the initial group of 22 Swedish expats had been replaced through local training programs.

In 1965, Packages Limited became a publicly traded company and raised PKR 16 million from the general public. Additionally, the International Finance Corporation (IFC) acquired a 13 percent equity stake by investing PKR 4 million. The ownership held by the Ali family decreased from approximately 47 percent of the common stock in 1965 to just under 30 percent by 1974.

By 1974, Packages was managing its own paper mill. Its Packaging Division was involved in the production of various types of packaging materials, including offset and flexo printed cartons, wrappers, labels, transport containers, and corrugated boxes, using materials such as cardboard, paper, cellophane, and plastic film.

Packages had also expanded into manufacturing standard office supplies such as notebooks, file covers, duplicating paper, and stationery. However, these items had not developed into major sources of revenue and were generally considered a minor aspect of the company's operations.

In 1981, Packages expanded its operations at its Lahore plant. The paperboard production capacity increased from 16,500 to 22,500 metric tons per annum. Additionally, the conversion capacity for Tetra paper was doubled to 2,900 tons annually, and the production of tissue paper was set to reach 350 tons per year. The expansion involved a total investment of $9.8 million, funded by several financial entities. The International Finance Corporation (IFC), contributed $2.1 million in loan, the Pakistan Industrial Credit and Investment Corporation (PICIC) provided $0.88 million, while the American Express Banking Corporation allocated $0.727 million towards the project.

=== 1982–2020: Joint ventures and growth ===
In 1982, Packages entered into a joint venture with Tetra Pak International to form Tetra Pak Pakistan Limited for the manufacture of paperboard for liquid food packaging. In 1993, it formed a further joint venture with Mitsubishi Corporation of Japan to establish Tri-Pack Films Limited for the production of biaxially oriented polypropylene (BOPP) films. In July 1994, another joint venture was formed with Coates Lorilleux to establish Coates Lorilleux Pakistan Limited (now DIC Pakistan Limited), which commenced production of printing inks in Pakistan. In 1996, a joint venture was signed with Printcare (Ceylon) Limited that led to the incorporation of Packages Lanka (Private) Limited, which began production in Sri Lanka in 1998.

In 2005, Packages commenced a greenfield project in Kasur under the name Bulleh Shah Paper Mills, named after the Punjabi Sufi poet Bulleh Shah. The facility, which began commercial operations in 2007, was developed in two phases and increased the company's paper and paperboard capacity from around 100,000 to 300,000 tons per annum. In 2009, Packages divested its stake in Tetra Pak Pakistan to Tetra Laval of Switzerland for approximately US$115 million. In 2012, the company entered into a joint venture with Stora Enso of Finland in its subsidiary Bulleh Shah Packaging; Stora Enso subsequently divested its 35% holding back to Packages in 2017, making Bulleh Shah Packaging a wholly-owned subsidiary.

In April 2017, Packages opened Packages Mall, a large shopping mall in Lahore developed through its subsidiary Packages Real Estate. In 2019, the board of directors and shareholders approved an internal restructuring of the company, and in 2020, following approval from the Securities and Exchange Commission of Pakistan, Packages transferred its manufacturing operations covering folding cartons, flexible packaging, consumer products and mechanical fabrication to a newly formed wholly-owned subsidiary, Packages Convertors Limited, converting itself into an investment holding company.

=== 2020–present: Restructuring and investments ===
In 2021, Packages incorporated StarchPack Limited as a wholly-owned subsidiary for the manufacture of corn-based starch products and derivatives, with commercial operations beginning in 2024. In 2022, Packages acquired the shareholding of Mitsubishi Corporation in Tri-Pack Films Limited, increasing Tri-Pack to a subsidiary of the group.

In April 2023, an investor consortium led by Packages Limited, including IGI Investments and affiliates of the Arshad Ali Gohar Group, completed the acquisition of the 52.87% stake held by Sanofi Foreign Participations B.V. in Sanofi-Aventis Pakistan Limited. The acquired company was subsequently renamed Hoechst Pakistan Limited in September 2023.

== Subsidiaries ==
Packages owns the following companies:

- Packages Convertors Limited
- Bulleh Shah Packaging Pvt. Ltd
- Tri-Pack Films Limited
- DIC Pakistan Limited
- OmyaPack
- StarchPack
- Packages Lanka Pvt. Ltd. (Sri Lanka)
- Flexible Packages Convertors (South Africa)
- Chantler Packages (Canada)
- Packages Power
- Packages Mall
- IGl Holdings Limited
- IGI General Insurance Limited
- IGI Investments Pvt Limited
- IGl Life Insurance Limited
- IGI Securities
- IGI FSI
