= Treet Corporation =

Pakistani manufacturer of razors and razor blades

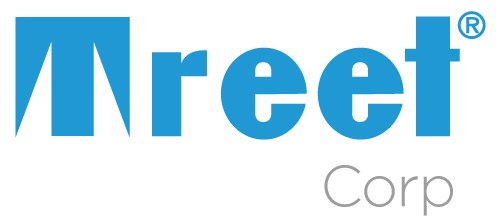
- Type: Public
- Traded as: PSX: TREET
- Industry: Personal care
- Founded: 1952; 74 years ago
- Founder: Syed Wajid Ali
- Headquarters: Lahore, Pakistan
- Area served: Pakistan
- Key people: Syed Sheharyar Ali (CEO); Syed Shahid Ali (chairman)
- Net income: ▼ Rs. −131.279 million (US$−470,000) (2024)
- Total equity: ▲ Rs. 14.242 billion (US$51 million) (2024)
- Owner: Syed Shahid Ali (31.41%); Syed Sheharyar Ali (10.58%)
- Number of employees: 2,089 (2024)
- Subsidiaries: Treet Holdings Limited; First Treet Manufacturing Modaraba; Treet HR Management; Treet Power Limited; Renacon Pharma Limited; Treet Battery Limited
- Website: treetcorp.com
- Footnotes; Financials as of 30 June 2024

Treet Corporation is a Pakistani conglomerate headquartered in Lahore. It manufactures blades and razors, metal components, corrugated boxes for shipping and storage, batteries, and soaps.

== History ==
It was founded in 1952 by Syed Wajid Ali in Karachi as a joint venture with the American Safety Razor Company of the United States. The original razor blade plant was located at Karachi's West Wharf and was later relocated to Hyderabad, Sindh in 1954.

In 1977, it was formally incorporated as Treet Corporation Limited under the Companies Act 1913.

In 2005, Treet established First Treet Manufacturing Modaraba, a multipurpose modaraba managed through Treet Holdings Limited, to undertake the manufacture of corrugated boxes and soaps.

In 2018, Treet established a Daewoo maintenance-free and deep-cycle battery manufacturing plant at the Faisalabad Industrial Estate, as part of First Treet Manufacturing Modaraba. In April 2023, the Modaraba demerged the battery segment, resulting in the separate listing of company as Treet Battery Limited. Treet Battery later launched its lithium-ion battery under the Lithion NeoPower.

In 2023, Treet announced its entry into the shaving foam segment and formed Treet Shaving Foam in July 2024.

In 2025, Treet invested Rs 430 million to expand the production capacity of its hygiene razors.

== Products ==
- Conventional and disposable razors
- Lead acid batteries (Daewoo brand batteries)
- Corrugated boxes for packaging
- Pharmaceuticals
- Soaps
- Metal components
