= Siddiqui =

Siddiqui (Arabic: صدیقی) are a Muslim community, found mainly in India, Pakistan, and Bangladesh.

It is also an Islamic-based common name in reference to the 1st Rashidun Caliph Abu Bakr who was known as Al-Siddiq, and is claimed by the community to be their ancestor, though the claim is part of the pattern of Ashrafization amongst Indian Muslim communities.

Notable people with the name include:

== Given name ==
- Siddiqui Ahmed Khan (1914–?), Indian sarangi player

== Surname ==
=== Siddiqui ===
- Aafia Siddiqui (born 1972), Pakistani scientist
- Abul Lais Siddiqui (1916–1994), Pakistani author and linguist
- Abdul Latif Siddiqui (born 1943), Bangladeshi politician, serving as a member of Jatiya Sangsad
- Abdul Samad Siddiqui, Indian politician
- Adnan Siddiqui (born 1969), Pakistani actor and model
- Aftab Siddiqui, Pakistani politician and member of the National Assembly of Pakistan
- Ahmed Siddiqui (American youth) (born 1996), American who was kidnapped as a child
- Akhtar Hameed Siddiqui (1947–2017), Bangladeshi politician who served as the Deputy Speaker of the Jatiya Sangsad
- Ali Jehangir Siddiqui (born 1976), Pakistani politician, administrator and ambassador
- Arifa Siddiqui, Pakistani actress
- Asad Siddiqui, Pakistani actor
- Ashraf Siddiqui (1927–2020), Bangladeshi poet, researcher, folklorist and essayist
- Ataullah Siddiqui, British academic
- Ausaf Umar Siddiqui (born 1966), also known as Omar Siddiqui, Pakistani business executive
- Aziza Siddiqui (born c. 1983), Afghan women's rights activist
- Bari Siddiqui (1954–2017), Bangladeshi singer-songwriter, flutist, and folk musician
- Barkat Siddiqui, Pakistani television director, producer and actor
- Hammad Siddiqui, Pakistani politician
- Haroon Siddiqui, Indo-Canadian newspaper journalist, columnist and a former editor
- Iqbal Siddiqui (born 1974), Indian cricketer
- Islam A. Siddiqui, American lobbyist of Indian descent
- Ishrat Ali Siddiqui, Indian gandhian, poet of Urdu literature and editor
- Jahangir Siddiqui, Pakistani businessman and philanthropist
- Javed Siddiqi (born 1942), Indian screenwriter
- Khalid Siddiqui (born 1958), Indian film and television actor
- Khalid Maqbool Siddiqui, Pakistani politician and government minister
- Kalim Siddiqui (1931–1996), Pakistani-British writer and Islamic activist
- Kamal Uddin Siddiqui, Bangladeshi economist and social scientist
- Mohsin Siddiqui, Pakistani politician and businessman
- Mona Siddiqui (born 1963), British academic and professor of Islamic and Interreligious Studies
- Muhammad Alauddin Siddiqui (1936–2017), Islamic Sufi scholar from Nerian Sharif Azad Kashmir Pakistan
- Muhammad Ali Siddiqui (1938–2013), Indian scholar of Urdu literature
- Muhammad Ibrahim Siddiqui, Indian Islamic scholar
- Muhammad Shafi Siddiqui (born 1965), Pakistani jurist and Justice of the Sindh High Court
- Muhammad Shoaib Siddiqui, Pakistani politician and Member of the Provincial Assembly of the Punjab
- Muneeba Ali Siddiqui (born 1997), Pakistani female cricketer
- Naeem Siddiqui (1916–2002), Pakistani Islamic scholar, writer and politician
- Nasimuddin Siddiqui (born 1959), Indian Uttar Pradesh politician, member of Indian National Congress
- Nawazuddin Siddiqui (born 1974), Indian film actor
- Nazim Hussain Siddiqui (born 1940), Pakistani jurist who served as Chief Justice of the Supreme Court of Pakistan
- Obaidur Rahman Siddiqui (born 1964), Indian historian
- Qamar Siddiqui, Pakistani poet
- Rasheed Ahmad Siddiqui (1892–1977), Urdu writer and a professor
- Rauf Siddiqui, Pakistani politician and a Member of the Provincial Assembly of Sindh
- Sadiya Siddiqui, Indian film and television actress
- Sadaf Siddiqui (born 1985), Pakistani track and field sprint athlete
- Saeeduzzaman Siddiqui (1939–2017), Pakistani jurist and legislator, former Chief Justice of Pakistan
- Salimuzzaman Siddiqui (1897–1994), Pakistani organic chemist specialising in natural product chemistry
- Saghar Siddiqui (1928–1974), Pakistani poet in Urdu
- Shahid Siddiqui, Indian politician and journalist, former member of the Rajya Sabha
- Shaukat Siddiqui (1923–2006), Pakistani writer of fiction
- Shaukat Aziz Siddiqui (born 1959), Pakistani jurist and former senior Justice of the Islamabad High Court
- Shakeel Siddiqui, Pakistani television stand-up comedian
- Sultana Siddiqui, Pakistani television director, producer and businessperson
- Tasneem Siddiqui, Pakistani politician and member of the National Assembly of Pakistan
- Tooba Siddiqui, Pakistani model
- Uroosa Siddiqui, Pakistani television actress and comedian
- Zeeshan Siddiqui (born 1975), Pakistani-born Norwegian cricketer
- Zillur Rahman Siddiqui (1928–2014), Bangladeshi writer, academic and educationist
- Sheheryar Munawar (born 1988), Pakistani actor and model

=== Siddiqi ===
- Abul Hasan Siddiqi (1943–2020), Indian mathematician and Professor of Applied Mathematics
- Abdul Wahab Siddiqi (1942–1994), Pakistani Sunni Muslim religious scholar and Sufi master
- Aijaz Siddiqi (1911–1978), Urdu writer and poet
- Anis Siddiqi (born 1959), Pakistani cricketer
- Asif Azam Siddiqi, Bangladeshi American space historian
- A. Y. B. I. Siddiqi (1945–2021), Bangladeshi Inspector General of Police
- Bilal Siddiqi (born 1994), Indian author and screenwriter
- Hafiz Siddiqi (1931–2018), Bangladeshi academic
- Imran Siddiqi (born 1957), Indian geneticist
- Irfan Siddiqi, American physicist and currently a Professor of Physics at the Quantum Nanoscience
- Jameela Siddiqi, British novelist, journalist, broadcaster, linguist
- Javaid Siddiqi (born 1977), American educator
- Javed Siddiqi (born 1942), Indian Hindi and Urdu writer
- Jawed Siddiqi, Pakistani British computer scientist and software engineer
- Kamal Siddiqi, Australian journalist of Pakistani origin
- Kashif Siddiqi (born 1986), English footballerof Indian descent
- L. K. Siddiqi (1939–2014), Bangladeshi politician and philanthropist and member of parliament
- Manzoor Ul Haq Siddiqi (1917–2004), Indian educationist, historian and an author
- Muhammad Abdul Aleem Siddiqi (1892–1954), Indian Islamic scholar
- Mustafizur Rahman Siddiqi (1925–1992), Bangladeshi entrepreneur, politician and diplomat
- Nasir Siddiqi (born 1965), Pakistani Emirati cricketer
- Obaid Siddiqi (1932–2013), Indian geneticist
- Ravish Siddiqi (1911–1971), Urdu Ghazal and Nazm writer
- Shujauddin Siddiqi (1919–2003), Indian cricketer
- Sumaiya Siddiqi (born 1988), Pakistani cricketer

== See also ==
- Amblyseius siddiqui, a species of mite in the family Phytoseiidae
- Daniel Seddiqui, American traveler and writer
