= Ravish =

Ravish may refer to

- Ravish Desai, Indian actor and model
- Ravish Kumar, Indian TV anchor, writer and journalist
- Ravish Malhotra, Indian air force officer and astronaut
- Ravish Siddiqi, Indian Urdu poet
