= Ali Jehangir Siddiqui =

Pakistani diplomat (born 1976)

- علي جھانگير صديقي
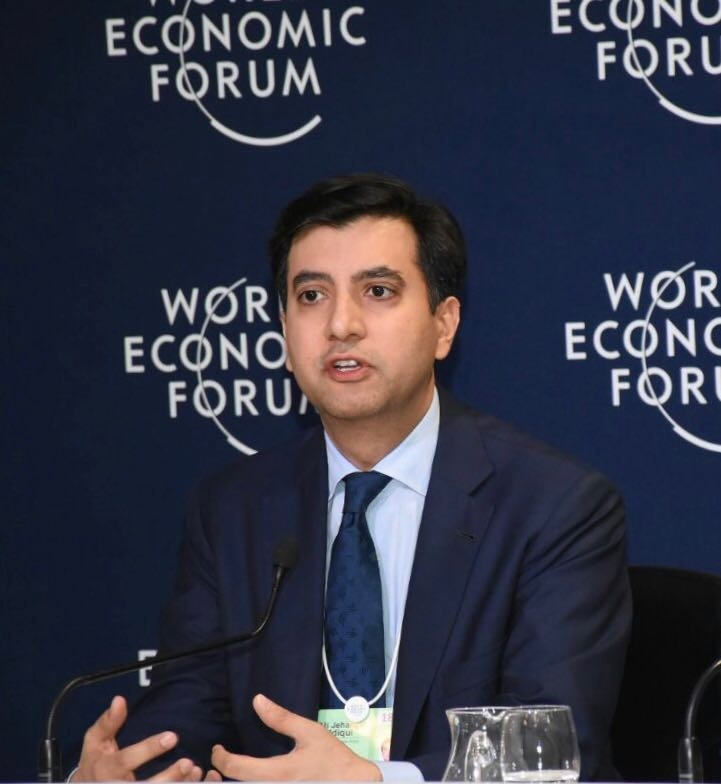

Pakistan's Ambassador at Large for Foreign Investment
- In office 14 June 2019 – April 2022
- President: Arif Alvi
- Prime Minister: Imran Khan

Pakistan’s Ambassador to the United States
- In office 29 May 2018 – 25 December 2018
- President: Mamnoon Hussain; Arif Alvi
- Prime Minister: Shahid Khaqan Abbasi; Nasirul Mulk; Imran Khan
- Preceded by: Aizaz Ahmad Chaudhry
- Succeeded by: Asad Majeed Khan

Special Assistant to the Prime Minister
- In office August 2017 – May 2018
- President: Mamnoon Hussain; Arif Alvi
- Prime Minister: Shahid Khaqan Abbasi

Personal details
- Born: 5 December 1976 (age 49) Karachi, Pakistan
- Spouse: Saira Munir Ahmed
- Parent(s): Jahangir Siddiqui; Mahvash Siddiqui
- Relatives: Sultana Siddiqui (aunt); Sheheryar Munawar (cousin)
- Education: Cornell University

Ali Jehangir Siddiqui (Urdu: علي جھانگير صديقي; born 5 December 1976) is a Pakistani diplomat and entrepreneur. He has served as the Ambassador of Pakistan to the United States, as Special Assistant to the Prime Minister of Pakistan with the status of Minister of State and Pakistan's Ambassador for Foreign Investment in an honorary capacity. He has also served in various business and government advisory councils, policy institutions, and commercial entities.

Siddiqui founded JS Bank Limited in 2006 by acquiring American Express Bank's Pakistan operations. JS Bank currently has an asset base of over $4 billion, with a workforce of 5000 employees and presence in 180 cities of Pakistan.

== Early life and background ==
Ali Jehangir Siddiqui was born into a Sindhi family to Jahangir Siddiqui, a Pakistani businessman, and Mahvash Jahangir Siddiqui, an educationist on 5 December 1976 in Karachi, Sindh. At the age of 15 he launched a technology business called Advance Micro Research which integrated computer network systems for corporations.

His father, Jahangir Siddiqui, founded Jahangir Siddiqui & Co. Ltd in 1970 which later became JS Group, an investment holding company with Rs. 413 billion (US$3.7 billion) in assets as of December 2017. The Group claims to employ more than 20,000 people in Pakistan and has invested in several companies in various sectors.

Siddiqui's mother Mahvash Siddiqui is an educationist by profession and has served as a Professor of English Literature and Head of the English Department at Khatoon-e-Pakistan College, Karachi.

== Career ==
=== Entrepreneurship ===
Siddiqui has been notable in several business ventures, as a counsel and advisor throughout his career. This came from his work and investment with partners for setting up various businesses, including: Airblue, one of Pakistan's largest low cost airlines that operates in Pakistan, the United Arab Emirates and Saudi Arabia; Arabian Gulf Steel, the second largest steel producer in the UAE and the world's first zero carbon steel producer; RAK Ghani Glass, the largest pharmaceutical glass producer in the UAE and GCC countries; JS Private Equity Management, the largest private equity firm in Pakistan and On Zero, a European zero carbon data center developer headquartered in Austria.

=== Government ===
Siddiqui has previously served as a board member of the Private Sector Task Force of the Planning Commission of the Government of Pakistan and a board member of the Privatization Commission of the Government of Pakistan.

== Public service ==
Until he took up his government roles, Siddiqui was the CEO of the Mahvash & Jahangir Siddiqui Foundation (MJSF), which provides grants to the education, humanitarian relief, healthcare and social enterprise sectors in Pakistan. After the 2010 floods, MJSF established refugee camps accommodating more than 10,000 affected individuals, providing food supplies to over 20,000 people and clean water for over 100,000 people during the 4-month relief operations period. MJSF worked in coordination with the UN agencies and INGOs.

Apart from humanitarian services, Siddiqui is also known to support the arts.

He previously served on the board of Acumen, a global social enterprise investment firm.

=== Special Assistant to the Prime Minister ===
Soon after Shahid Khaqan Abbasi became Prime Minister of Pakistan, Siddiqui joined the Government and served as a Special Assistant to the Prime Minister with the status of a Minister of State from August 2017 until May 2018.

=== Ambassador to the US ===
In March 2018, he was appointed as the Ambassador of Pakistan to the United States and commenced his duties on 29 May 2018.

Prior to his appointment as the Pakistani Ambassador to the United States, the National Accountability Bureau (NAB) claimed that Siddiqui was involved in matters relating to three companies: Azgard, Agritech, and Monte Bello which caused losses to investors and shareholders. Their claim was that Azgard siphoned moneys amounting to €23.758 million to purchase the company Monte Bello SRL using another company Fairytal SRL Sweden which resulted in a loss for shareholders.

Reports suggested that the allegations from NAB were baseless and politically motivated as the Azgard and Agritech matters were already sub-judice prior to Siddiqui's appointment and Siddiqui was neither a party nor a respondent in these proceedings. Siddiqui had also left the board of directors of Montebellos parent company four years prior to its bankruptcy. The counterclaims, thus, indicated that the allegations in the investigation were an attempt to defame him and impede his appointment as Ambassador to the United States and the court decided in favour of Siddiqui.

Siddiqui's reputation and work was acknowledged by US commentators while it was frequently criticized by Indian media.

In June 2018, Siddiqui presented his credentials to US President Donald Trump.

In July 2018, Siddiqui met James Mattis, the US Secretary of Defence. The meeting took place at the Pentagon where Siddiqui received a guard of honor on behalf of Pakistan.

During celebrations for Pakistan's 71st Anniversary of Independence in August 2018 at the Pakistani Embassy in Washington, Principal Deputy Assistant Secretary of State for South and Central Asian Affairs Ambassador Alice Wells, the Chief Guest at the event, acknowledged Pakistan's sacrifices against terrorism and regarded Siddiqui as an important figure in the area, acquainted with many across the sphere due to the enthusiasm he brought to the role.

In October 2018, the Pakistani Foreign Minister Shah Mehmood Qureshi announced a change in Pakistan's ambassadorial appointments to multiple countries including the United States, Canada, Saudi Arabia, Qatar, Serbia, Cuba amongst others. The individuals being changed were appointed during the regime of Pakistan Muslim League-Nawaz (PML-N).

Speaking of Siddiqui's role with regards to Pak-US relations at the launch of the Pak-Americana Report by Tabadlab on 12 February 2021, the Former Foreign Secretary of Pakistan, Salman Bashir, credited Ali Jehangir Siddiqui for overcoming obstacles and specifically making possible the Pakistan Prime Minister's visit to the White House for a summit with President Donald Trump.

=== Ambassador for Foreign Investment ===
On 13 June 2019, Ali Jehangir Siddiqui was appointed as Ambassador for Foreign Investment in an Honorary Capacity. Under his tenure, Hutchison Port Holdings—Hong Kong–based port operator—committed on 15 October 2019 to invest US$240 million in Karachi Port in order to make it a major trading hub.

The Pakistani Prime Minister, Imran Khan, received the delegation of the group in October 2019, led by their Managing Director, Eric Ip.

== World Economic Forum ==
Siddiqui was appointed to lead Pakistan Prime Ministers' agendas at the World Economic Forum Annual Meetings in 2018 and 2020. In an interview, he summarized the delegation's engagements at WEF 2020 under the key themes of an expanded economic partnership with Turkey, increased footprint among existing Japanese conglomerates, and Digital Pakistan.

In 2014, he was honored as a Young Global Leader by the World Economic Forum.

== Multilateral engagement ==
As Special Assistant to the Prime Minister in 2017 and 2018, Siddiqui participated as a member of the Prime Ministers delegations to the Organization of Islamic Cooperation, Commonwealth Heads of Government Meetings, UN General Assembly, Shanghai Cooperation Organization's Council of Heads of Government Meetings and the World Economic Forum Annual Meetings.

He was tasked to lead the Prime Minister's agenda at the annual meeting of World Economic Forum 2020 held in January, at Davos.

== Personal life ==
Siddiqui is married to Saira Siddiqui, a Montessori teacher by profession.

== Academic ==
Siddiqui was educated at the Karachi Grammar School and received his degree in Economics from Cornell University.

He also completed additional educational courses at MIT, the University of Cambridge, and the University of Oxford.

He has spoken and lectured at various institutions, including the College of William and Mary in Virginia, the National School of Public Policy in Lahore, the National Defence University, the Entrepreneurship and Management Excellence Center at the Institute of Business Management, the School of Advanced International Studies at Johns Hopkins University in Washington, DC, the University of Oxford and Boston University.

He has also spoken at and written for the Center for Strategic and International Studies, Carnegie Endowment for International Peace and the Atlantic Council.

== Awards and achievements ==
Siddiqui was listed by Pakistan's Federal Board of Revenue as amongst the top 100 individual taxpayers in Pakistan for the year 2013.
