= Karachi Film Society =

- انجمن فلم کراچی
- Formation: May 2017
- Location(s): II Chundrigar Road, Karachi, Sindh, Pakistan
- Region served: Pakistan
- Founder: Sultana Siddiqui
- Website: www.karachifilmsociety.org

Karachi Film Society (KFS), is a non-profit film presentation organization based in Karachi, Pakistan. Founded in 2017 by Hum TV Network Limited president Sultana Siddiqui - the film society spotlights Pakistani cinema, world cinema and recognizes and supports new filmmakers by providing access through its workshops, seminars and festivals.

The Karachi Film Society also hosts the inaugural and would be annual Pakistan International Film Festival (PIFF).

== Winners and nominees ==
Below is the list of winners and nominations

== Winners and nominees ==
Best Film	Best Director
Punjab Nahi Jaungi -Salman Iqbal, Humayun Saeed and Shahzad Nasib; Actor In Law - Fizza Ali Meerza; Janaan; Dobara Phir Se	Nadeem Beyg – Punjab Nahi Jaungi; Farhan Alam – Saawan; Nabeel Qureshi – Actor In Law; Yasir Nawaz – Mehrunisa V Lub U
Best Actor Male	Best Actor Female
Fahad Mustafa – Actor In Law; Humayun Saeed – Punjab Nahi Jaungi; Ahsan Khan – Chupan Chupai; Bilal Ashraf – Yalghaar	Mehwish Hayat – Actor In Law; Hareem Farooq – Dobara Phir Se; Mahira Khan – Verna; Syra Shehroz – Chalay Thay Saath; Uzma Hassan – Arth - The Destination
Best Writer	Best Music
Khalil-ur-Rehman Qamar – Punjab Nahi Jaungi; Nabeel Qureshi and Fizza Ali Meerza – Actor In Law; Bilal Sami – Dobara Phir Se	Sahir Ali Bagga – Arth - The Destination; Shani Arshad – Punjab Nahi Jaungi; Akhtar Qayyum – Rangreza
Best Male Debut	Best Female Debut
Ali Rehman Khan – Janaan; Bilal Ashraf – Janaan; Haroon Shahid – Verna; Syed Karam Aabbas – Saawan	Hania Amir – Janaan; Saba Qamar – Lahore Se Aagey; Sana Javed – Mehrunisa V Lub U; Sanam Saeed – Bachaana
Best Editor	Best Cinematography
Mitesh Soni – Janaan; Asif Mumtaz – Na Maloom Afraad 2; Rizwan AQ – Punjab Nahi Jaungi
