= BankIslami =

Islamic bank in Pakistan

BankIslami Pakistan
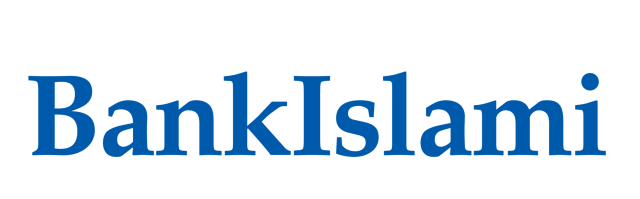
- Type: Public
- Traded as: PSX: BIPL; KSE 100 component
- Industry: Islamic banking
- Founded: 7 April 2006; 20 years ago
- Headquarters: Karachi, Sindh, Pakistan
- Key people: Imran H Shaikh (President & CEO)
- Products: Retail banking; consumer banking; investment banking; trade financing
- Net income: ▲ Rs. 45.166 billion (US$160 million) (2025)
- Owner: JS Bank (75.12%)
- Number of employees: 8000+ (2025)
- Parent: JS Bank
- Website: bankislami.com.pk

BankIslami Pakistan Limited (Urdu pronunciation: [bɛŋk ɪs.ˈlaː.mi] bank-is-LAH-mee) is a Pakistani Islamic bank based in Karachi. It operates as a Shariah-compliant financial institution. As of 2025, BankIslami operates an extensive network of over 550 branches across Pakistan. According to the State Bank of Pakistan's 2024 report, BankIslami was listed among the top three Islamic banks in terms of assets and deposits.

== History ==
BankIslami was incorporated in 2005 and commenced operations on April 7th, 2006, after receiving its Islamic Banking license from the State Bank of Pakistan under the 2003 Islamic Banking Policy. It was among the first Islamic banks in the country to operate entirely under Shariah-compliant principles.

In May, 2015, BankIslami acquired KASB Bank Limited, merging its branches into BankIslami's network following regulatory intervention by the State Bank of Pakistan to safeguard depositors.

In August 2023, JS Bank Limited acquired a 67.33% state in BankIslami, increasing its total shareholding to 75.12% and making BankIslami a part of JS Group. JS Bank stated that this acquisition was partly done due to not having an Islamic banking window or operations. As of 2025, both institutions continue to operate independently, with BankIslami focusing on Islamic banking and JS Bank maintaining its conventional banking operations.

In May 2025, BankIslami acquired the 32-storey KASB Altitude building in Karachi to use as their new headquarters.

== Ownership ==
BankIslami is majority-owned by JS Bank, which holds a 75.12% stake in the bank and is part of the JS Group. Jahangir Siddiqui & Co., the holding company of JS Group, has a long-term credit rating of "AA" and a short-term credit rating of "A1+" from (PACRA).

== Governance ==
The executive operations of BankIslami are managed by an executive team led by the President and Chief Executive Officer and overseen by a Board of Directors. Shariah compliance is overseen by an independent Shariah Supervisory Board chaired by Mufti Irshad Ahmad Aijaz. Other members of the board include Mufti Muhammad Hussain Khaleel Khail, Mufti Syed Hussain Ahmed, and Mufti Javed Ahmad.

== Products and services ==
BankIslami offers financial services through its retail, corporate and investment banking operations. The bank provides working capital and structured financing facilities to corporate and enterprise (SME) clients, as well as employee banking services. Its investment banking operations include Sukuk structuring, Islamic financing arrangements, and advisory services for corporate and institutional clients.

In June 2025, the bank launched Aik, a digital banking platform offering Shariah-compliant financial services.

== Market position and financial performance ==
As of June 2026, BankIslami reported total assets of over PKR 810 billion and deposits of over PKR 700 billion. For the first half of 2026, the bank reported a profit before tax of PKR 4.31 billion and total income of PKR 20.5 billion. Over the same period, its gross financing stood at PKR 338 billion and its investments at PKR 305 billion.
