= National Archives of Pakistan =

Central repository of the government of Pakistan

Coordinates: 33.7402°N 73.0943°E

- قومی دفتر خانہَ پاکستان

Agency overview
- Formed: 8 December 1973
- Preceding agency: Directorate of Archives and Libraries
- Jurisdiction: Government of Pakistan
- Agency executive: Director-General
- Parent agency: Cabinet Division
- Website: Official website

The National Archives of Pakistan (Urdu: قومی دفتر خانہَ پاکستان) is a body established by the Government of Pakistan for the purpose of preserving and making available public and private records which have bearings on the history, culture and heritage of Pakistan. Located in Islamabad, the National Archives of Pakistan is a member of the International Council on Archives. Some of its stated functions are the acquisition, preservation, conservation, reprography, restoration, automation, dissemination and access of documents. NAP is also responsible for the facilitation of important state documents and collections of dated files.

== History ==
The Directorate of Archives and Libraries was established in 1951 under the Ministry of Education. On 8 December 1973, the directorate was divided into two which gave rise to a separate National Archives under the authority of the Cabinet Division. A major newspaper of Pakistan reported, "Despite the existence of the National Archives Act 1993 and the Archives Material (Preservation and Export Control) Act 1975, government ministries have been lax in transferring documents to NAP."

== Organization ==
Director General (BPS 20) heads National Archives of Pakistan. It is organized into 3 departments for record keeping, conservation, reprography and administration/accounts.

=== Public Record Wing ===
Public Record Wing, also known as Public Collection Wing, manage the acquisition, preservation and review of public record activities.

=== Private Collections Wing ===
Private Collections Wing is responsible for acquisition of private collections having national or historical significance.

=== Technical Wing ===
Technical Wing is responsible to provide technical support to other departments. Technical Wing is subdivided into 3 sections.

- Microfilming
- Repair and Preservation section
- Oral Archives

== National Archives Library ==
National Archives Library has 19000 books, mainly on history of the Indian subcontinent.

== Important collections at the NAP ==
The National Archives of Pakistan (NAP) houses the following important collections, among others:

- The Quaid-e-Azam papers
- The Fatima Jinnah papers
- The Ruttie Jinnah papers
- The Muslim League leaders' papers/correspondence
- The National Freedom Movement archives
- The Allama Iqbal papers
- The Abol Hassan Ispahani papers
- The Shamsul Hasan collection (papers, documents, photographs and other archival material etc.)
- The Mufti Fazal Azeem collection
- The Lakha collection
- The Malik Lal Khan collection
- The Nawab Waqar ul Mulk collection
- The Dawoodi collection
- The Muhammad Afzal Husain collection
- The Manzoor Ul Haq Siddiqi collection
- The Muhammad Siddique collection
- The Atiq Zafar Sheikh collection
- The Hassan Zaheer collection
- The Ehsan Danish collection
- The Aziz Beg collection
- The Sojan Singh Bedi collection
- The Azra Asghar collection
- The Kaleem collection
- The Begum Mahmooda Salim Khan collection
- Microfilms of newspapers

== Activities ==
NAP has participated in more than 50 international conferences, seminars, symposium and workshops, and hosted International Symposium on Archives 1982 (participated 13 countries), 1989 SWARBICA Regional Seminar on Training Needs and Policies (participated by 7 countries) and 1991 SAARC Seminar on Archives.

== See also ==
- List of national archives
- List of museums in Pakistan
- National Documentation Wing
