= Fry's Electronics =

Former American big-box store electronics retailer

Fry's Electronics, Inc.
- Type: Private
- Industry: Retail
- Founded: May 17, 1985; 41 years ago Sunnyvale, California, U.S.
- Founders: John Fry; Randy Fry; David Fry
- Defunct: February 24, 2021; 5 years ago
- Fate: Liquidation; general assignment, cited reasons were the COVID-19 pandemic and a "difficult, ever-changing retail environment"
- Headquarters: San Jose, California, U.S.
- Number of locations: 30 (at the time of closure) (Note: Down from a peak of 34 locations in 2019.)
- Area served: United States (locations in Arizona, California, Georgia, Illinois, Indiana, Nevada, Oregon, Texas and Washington)
- Key people: John Fry, CEO; Randy Fry, President; David Fry, CFO / CIO; Kathryn Kolder, Executive Vice President
- Products: Consumer electronics retail
- Revenue: ▼US$2.3 billion (2018)
- Number of employees: 14,000 (2018)
- Website: Archived official website at the Wayback Machine (archive index)

Fry's Electronics was an American big-box store chain. It was headquartered in San Jose, California, in Silicon Valley. Fry's retailed software, consumer electronics, household appliances, cosmetics, tools, toys, accessories, magazines, technical books, snack foods, electronic components, and computer hardware, in addition to offering in-store computer repair and custom computer building services.

Fry's began with one store in Sunnyvale, California, and expanded to 34 stores in nine states at its peak in 2019.

On February 24, 2021, Fry's announced the immediate and permanent closure of all of its stores. A statement posted on its website cited "changes in the retail industry and the challenges posed by the COVID-19 pandemic".

== History ==
Science fiction themed store in Burbank, California

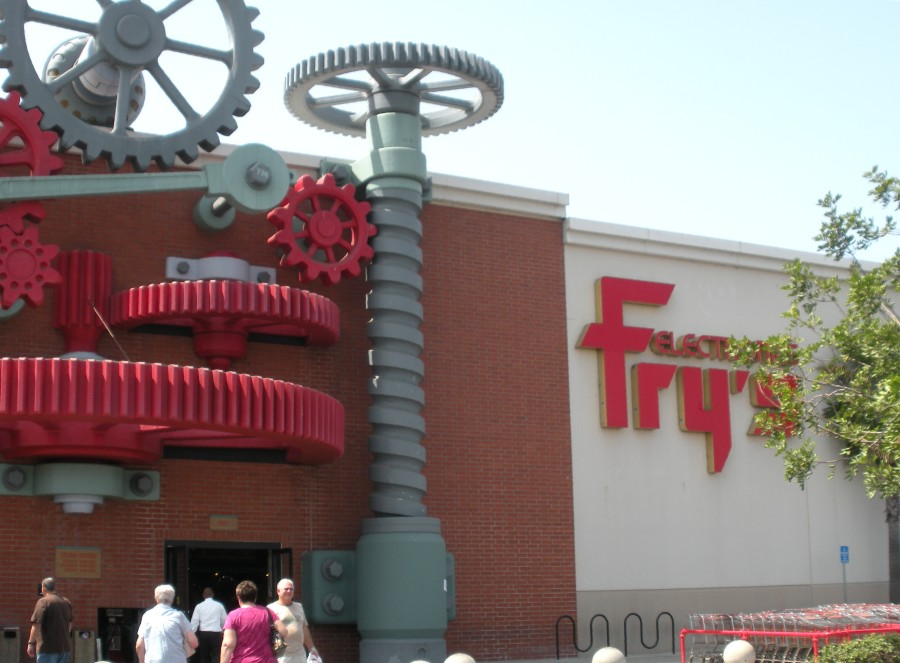
Industrial revolution themed store in City of Industry, California

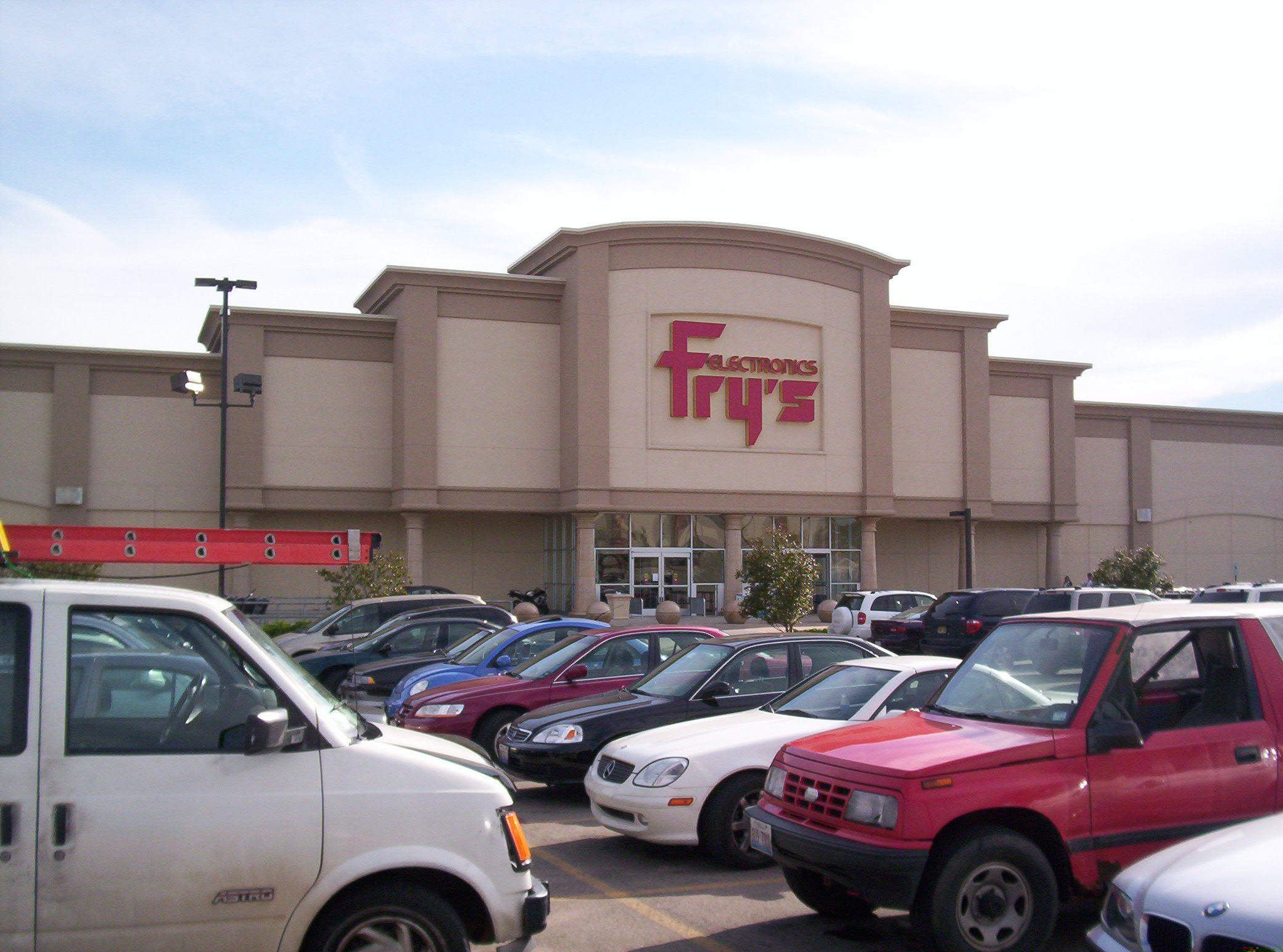
Fry's Electronics store in Downers Grove, Illinois

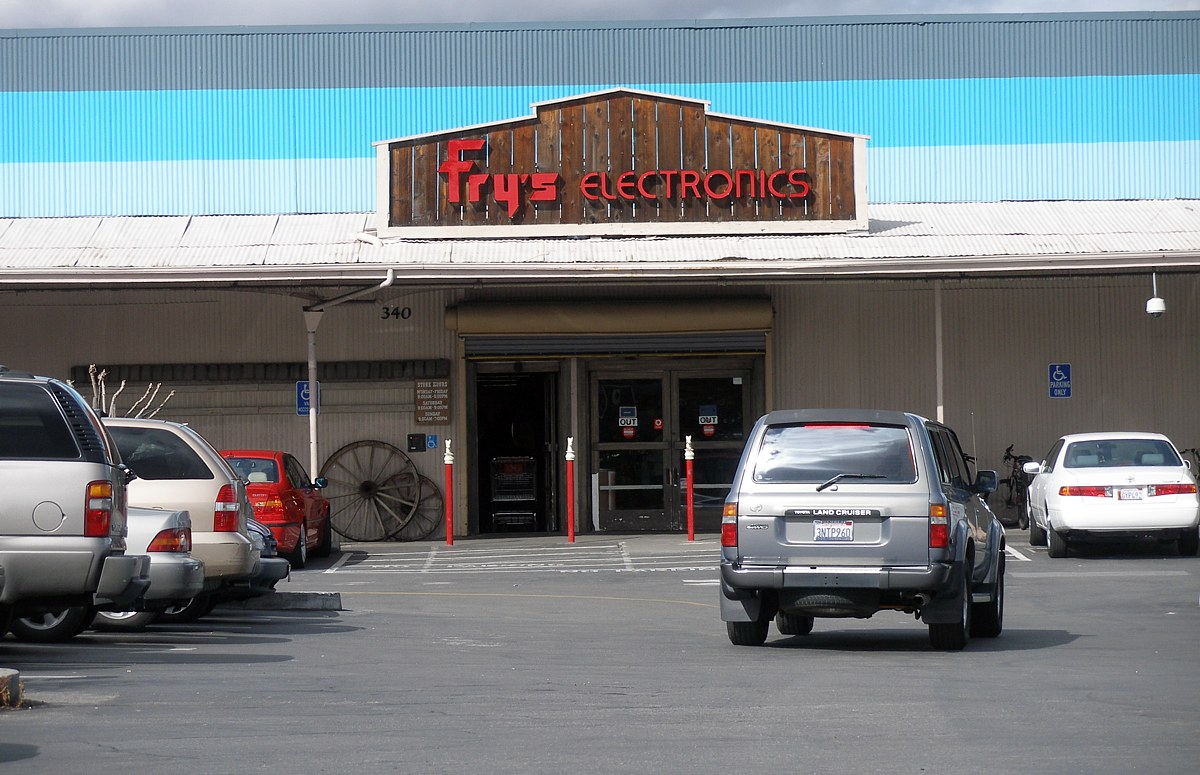
Fry's Electronics, Palo Alto, California, 2006, then-oldest operating store (closed 2019), in a former cannery, operated by Thomas Foon Chew

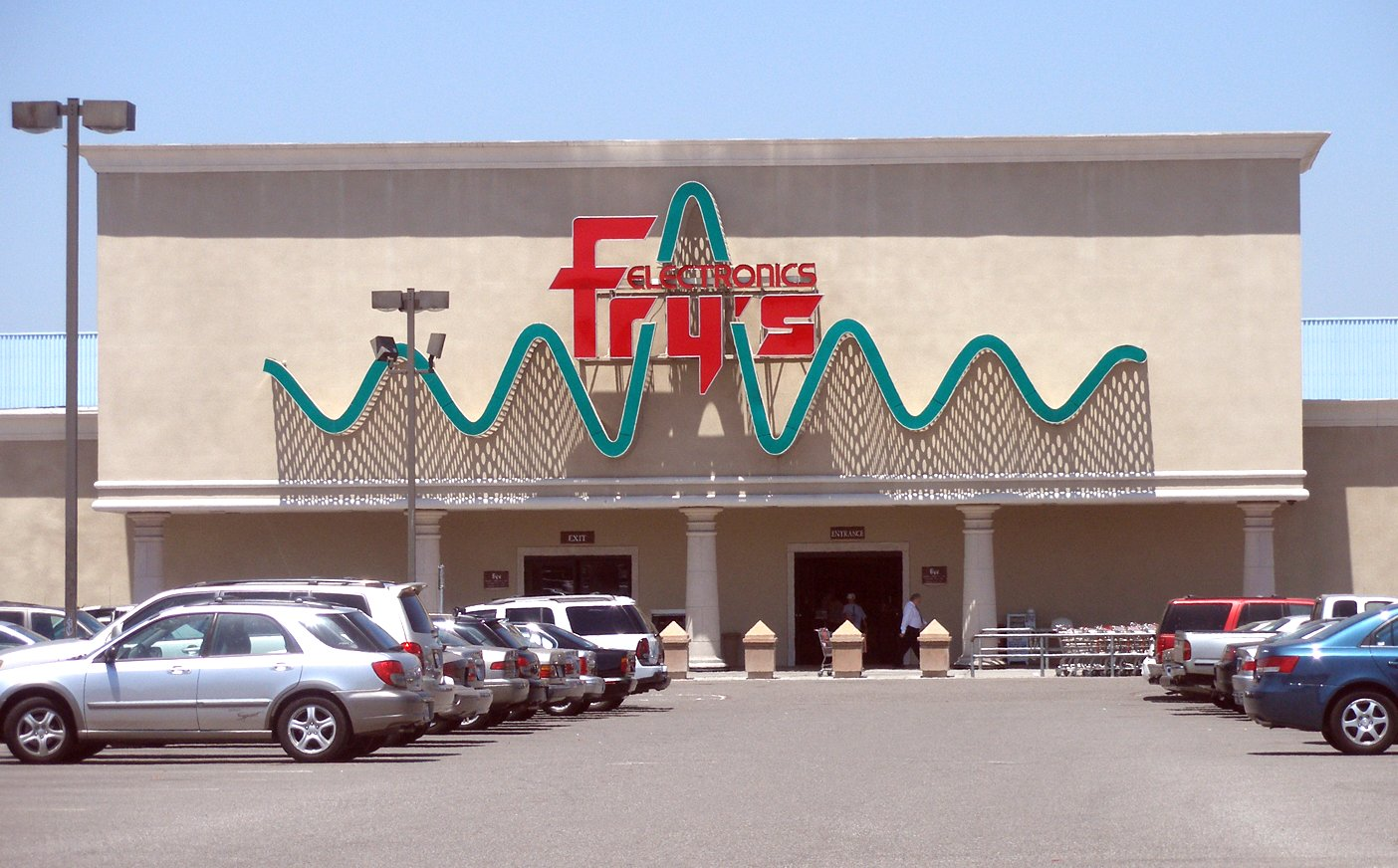
Silicon Valley history-themed store in Sunnyvale, California

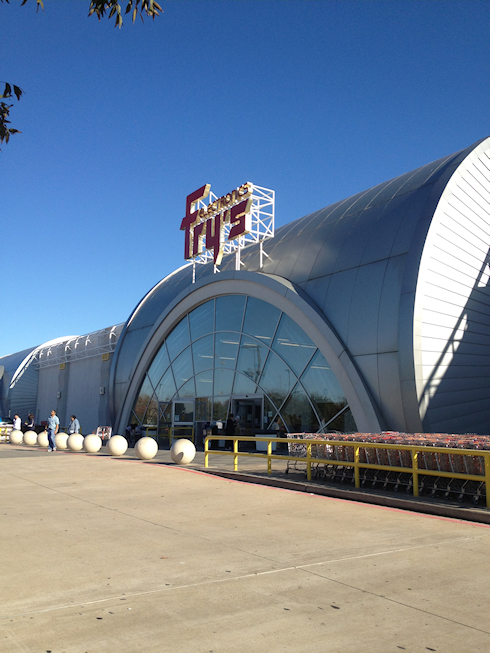
Space station-themed store near the Johnson Space Center in Webster, Texas

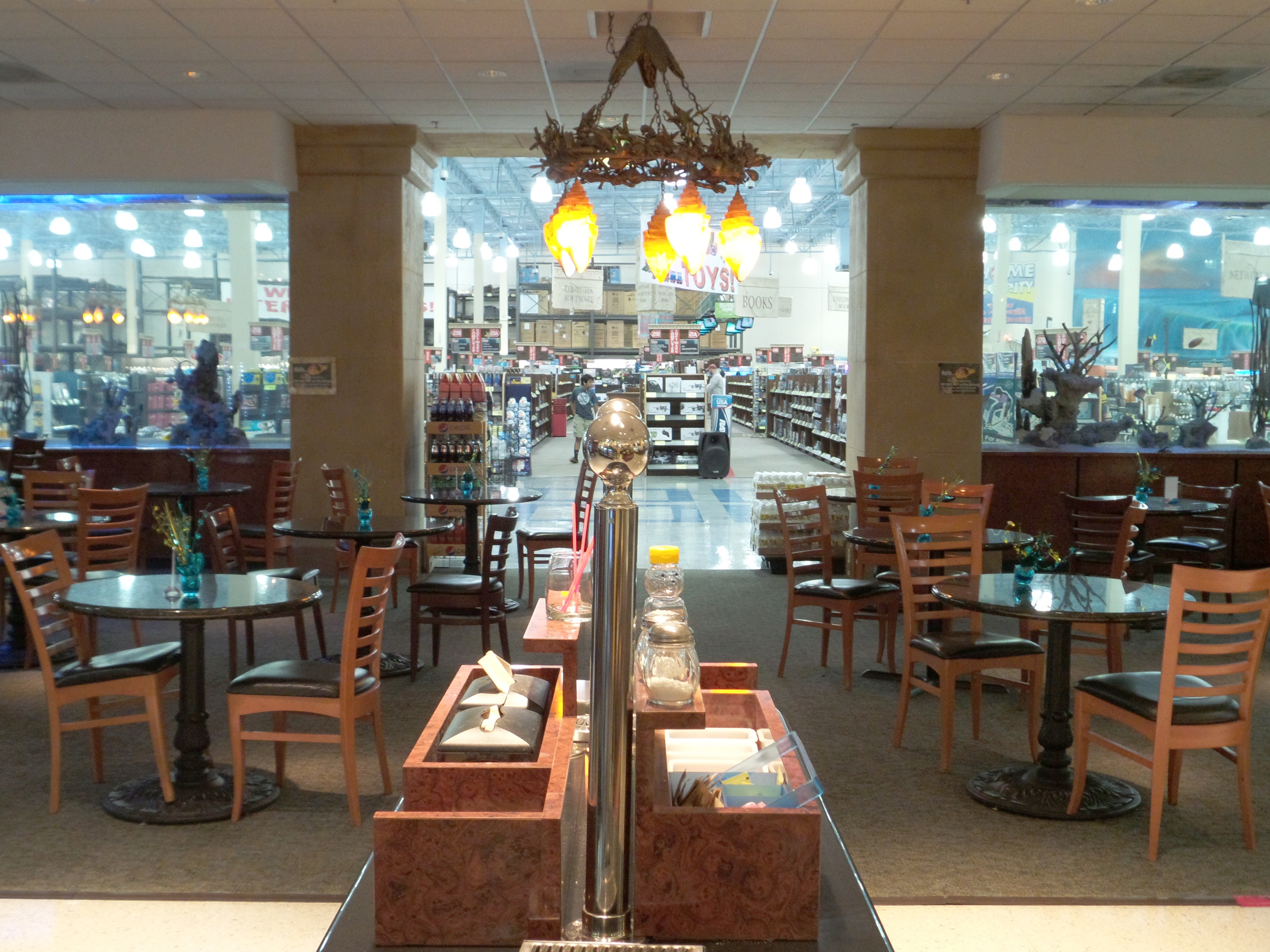
Inside the San Marcos Fry's Electronics

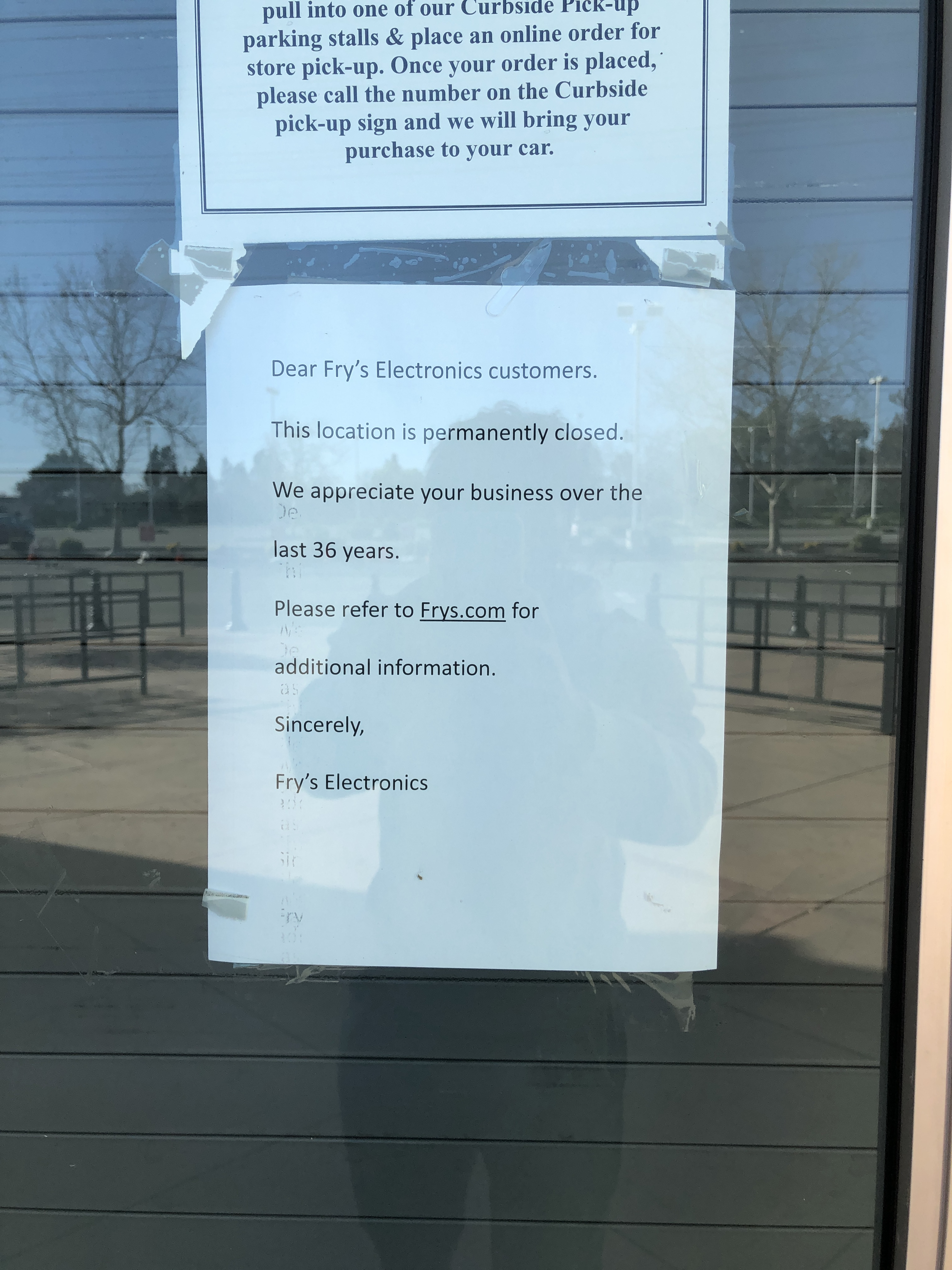
Notice posted on the entrance of the Fremont, California, Fry's Electronics on February 24, 2021

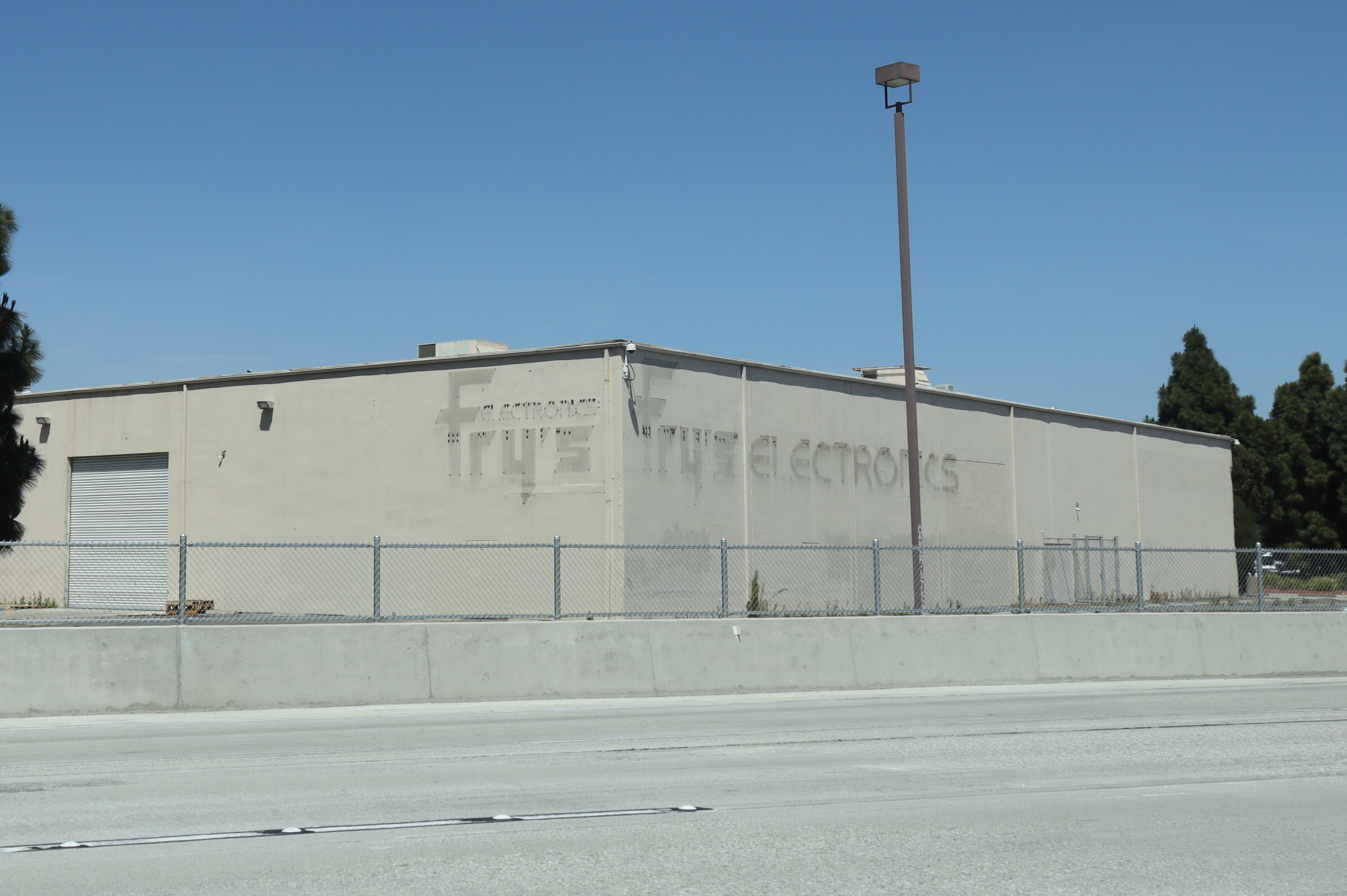
Outlines of removed storefront signs at the Fountain Valley, California, location (now a Sports Basement location), seen from I-405

In 1972, Charles Fry sold the Fry's Supermarkets chain based in California for US$14 million to Dillons. He gave a portion of the proceeds, around $1 million, to each of his sons, John (who had worked as the IT manager for the supermarket chain), W. Randolph (who goes by the nickname "Randy"), and David, none of whom had much interest in grocery store retailing. Instead, on May 17, 1985, they joined together with a fourth partner, John's former girlfriend Kathryn Kolder, to open the first Fry's Electronics store at a 20,000 ft^{2} (1,900 m^{2}) site in Sunnyvale, California. Today, Fry's Food and Drug stores are owned and operated by Kroger, and are not affiliated with Fry's Electronics, although they have similar logos.

John's idea was to use the model of grocery retailing, with which the brothers were familiar, to sell computer and electronics supplies. The original Sunnyvale store (located near the intersection of Oakmead Parkway and Lakeside Drive) stocked numerous high-tech supplies such as integrated circuits, test and measurement equipment, and computer components, as well as software and various other types of consumer electronics. The store was one of the few retail outlets in the country that sold off-the-shelf microprocessors, such as the Intel 80286. The store also sold T-shirts, technical books, potato chips, and magazines, including Playboy. At first, roughly half the store was stocked with groceries, including fresh produce, but the groceries section quickly diminished to displays of soft drinks and snack foods. The store billed itself as "The One-Stop Shop for the Silicon Valley Professional", as one could buy both electronics and groceries (computer chips and potato chips) at the same time. Most components from most OEMs were available for purchase.

As the business expanded, the original Sunnyvale store closed, and a newer, larger store was opened across Lawrence Expressway on Kern Avenue. The second Sunnyvale store was designed to look like the interior of a giant computer; the walls were adorned with simulated circuit components, and the floor resembled a giant printed circuit board. The exterior was painted to mimic a huge DIP integrated circuit, and the door handles imitated the ENTER and ESC keys on a computer keyboard; since 2005, this store has housed a Sports Basement store (which still bore some of the door-handle keys until sometime between 2009 and 2013). Fry's moved again to its final Sunnyvale location at 1077 E Arques Ave, the former site of a facility of the Link Flight Simulation Division of the Singer Corporation. Each of the three Sunnyvale store locations was located within 1 mile (1.6 km) of the others.

Because Fry's stores were enormous, stocking a wide range of each product category, they were popular with electronics and computer hobbyists and professionals. One of the few stores to challenge Fry's in all dimensions (production selection and store-wide themes) was Incredible Universe, a series of Tandy (Radio Shack) superstores, which were established in 1992, bought out, and converted into Fry's in 1996. Historically, Circuit City and CompUSA were major competitors in the computer space, but they collapsed during the late-2000s recession, leaving Micro Center and Newegg as Fry's main competitors.

In August 2014, Fry's Electronics operated 34 brick-and-mortar stores in 9 U.S. states: California (17), Texas (8), Arizona (2), Georgia (2), and one each in Illinois, Indiana, Nevada, Oregon, and Washington.

In August 2019, Fry's announced that it would close its oldest extant location in Palo Alto, by January 2020; the company said its lease at the location would not be renewed. On September 10, 2019, The Mercury News reported that customers were finding barren shelves in most stores, speculating that the chain was about to fold; Fry's responded by stating the company was changing to a consignment model with its vendors and was not planning to close any store other than Palo Alto. However, on January 7, 2020, The Atlanta Journal-Constitution reported that the Fry's location in Duluth, Georgia, was shuttered without advance notice during the 2019 holiday season. On February 25, 2020, Fry's announced that they would close their Anaheim location by March 2, 2020. On November 10, 2020, Fry's abruptly closed its Campbell location permanently.

=== Closure ===
On the evening of February 23, 2021, several internet sources began claiming employees were given notice that all remaining stores would close to the public nationwide, with the Frys.com website scheduled to go offline at 12:00 am PST. The company deleted its Facebook page, and set the company Twitter account to protected, hiding all activity. Bay Area broadcaster KRON-TV confirmed the closure later that evening.

The Fry's website closed in the early hours of February 24, only showing a letter informing of its closure. According to the letter, the company would implement the shutdown through an orderly wind-down process that it believed would be in the best interests of the company, its creditors, and other stakeholders to maximize the value of the company's assets for its creditors and other stakeholders. The company said those waiting for repairs will be notified how to claim their equipment.

Fry's officially entered general assignment on April 2, 2021, and began to liquidate all remaining assets, including owned real estate with Hilco Global.

== Criticism ==
In 1997, Forbes reported on a series of issues about Fry's customer service and unorthodox business practices. Among the allegations was that the company had an internal policy, identified as "the double H" or "hoops and hurdles", to delay or prevent customers from obtaining refunds.

In 1998, USA Today and Wired reported that many customers had become frustrated with poor customer service at Fry's stores.

In 2003, actors Denzel Washington, Bruce Willis, and California Governor Arnold Schwarzenegger sued Fry's for $10 million each for posting their images on television sets on their print ads and flyers without permission.

On Black Friday 2007, customers at the Renton, Washington location complained that Fry's employees were offering to let people cut in front of a long line for a fee. After complaints in the media, Fry's management offered anyone who paid the fee their money back.

In 2008, the Federal Communications Commission found Fry's failed to place the required "analog-only tuner" consumer-alert label on analog televisions, fining them $384,000 (~$562,950 in 2025).

In 2008, Fry's vice president of merchandising and operations, Ausaf Umar Siddiqui, was charged by federal prosecutors in a kickback scheme involving Fry's vendors, fueling sales with mail-in rebates. The alleged scheme was designed to defraud the company. Siddiqui used the funds to (among other things) feed his gambling habit in Las Vegas, where he lost about $162 million.

In September 2012, Fry's Electronics agreed to pay $2.3 million (~$3.18 million in 2025), and to implement preventive measures, to settle a sexual harassment and retaliation lawsuit brought by the U.S. Equal Employment Opportunity Commission. The settlement was in relation to allegations that an assistant store manager at the Renton store harassed a 20-year-old sales associate by frequently sending her sexually charged text messages and inviting her to his house to drink. After her direct supervisor reported the harassment to Fry's legal department, the company allegedly fired the female salesperson and fired her supervisor for standing up for her.

In 2017, a store in Webster, Texas made headlines when a manager set up a display to demonstrate indoor grow lights for sale and used realistic looking but ultimately fake marijuana plants. This was considered unacceptable by the local community considering marijuana was illegal in the state of Texas.

In 2019, rumors about the chain folding spread rapidly, mainly because shelves were empty for long periods of time and stores seemed to emphasize makeup and fragrances over electronics. Fry's responded by stating they were simply switching to a consignment model, not closing down entirely. From when Fry's put out this statement until early 2021, four additional stores closed (three were in California, and one in Duluth, Georgia), which further led many to believe that the company would soon go out of business.

== Online sales operation ==
Fry's Electronics was late in establishing an online sales presence. They began offering low-cost Internet access in 2000 through their original website "Frys.com". The company later bought e-commerce site Cyberian Outpost in November 2001, and started online sales with a different URL (Outpost.com), which confused customers who did not associate the online name with the brick-and-mortar store. For a time in the mid-2000s, the website identified itself as "Fry's Electronics Outpost.com", using dual branding in an attempt to create a connection in visitors' minds. In October 2006, a grand reopening of Frys.com introduced the online store with the same name as the retail outlets. The outpost.com URL later began redirecting to the Fry's online store.

== Domain name acquisitions ==
In 1997, David Peter (or David Peter Burlini), who manufactured and sold French fry vending machines under the business name Frenchy Frys, owned the domain name frys.com, and was also involved in another dispute over the domain newricochet.com with Ricochet Networks. David Burlini attended Santa Clara University around the same time that the Fry Brothers were attending. Fry's Electronics brought suit against him that year, alleging trademark infringement, and ultimately prevailed in a default judgment.

Fry's Electronics aggressively tried to defend its trademark and domain names. In 2001, it threatened to sue Garret Maki for scanning and posting the company's print ads on the internet using the domain frysad.com. In 2007, Fry's Electronics lost a domain dispute against Prophet Partners Inc., an online advertising company with thousands of generic and descriptive domain names. The arbitrator dismissed the complaint, which requested transfer of the Frys.us domain, ruling that Fry's Electronics did not have any more right to use the "Fry's" mark than other entities with a similar surname or commercial use of the word.

== Store themes ==
Various Fry's locations were decorated in elaborate themes. For example, the Burbank store, which opened in 1995, carried a theme of 1950s and 1970s science-fiction movies, and featured huge statues of popular characters such as the robot Gort from The Day the Earth Stood Still and Darth Vader from the Star Wars movie series. In addition, giant ants (from the movie Them!) hung from the ceiling, and the bodies of 1957 Chevys and Buicks served as dining tables in the cafe. A flying saucer protruded above the entrance. The spaceship was to be saved, however, it was instead demolished along with the Burbank location in 2025.

Since Fry's acquired seven stores from the Incredible Universe chain of stores, the company had reduced the elaborateness of its themes. With the opening of the store in Fishers, Indiana, Fry's made a "race track" theme with various hanging displays, including "stop" and "go" signs, as well as many photos of what life looked like in the late 1800s and early 1900s in Indianapolis.

Of the chain's 34 stores in 2019, 30 of them closed on February 24, 2021. Four stores were closed earlier:

- The Duluth location closed on December 3, 2019.
- The Palo Alto location (Wild West theme) closed on December 27, 2019.
- The Anaheim location closed on March 2, 2020.
- The Campbell location (Egyptian temple theme) closed on November 10, 2020.

== In media ==
Fry's Electronics is prominently featured in the 2022 film Nope, which filmed at the Burbank location following its closure.

The Phoenix, Arizona location is also featured in Season 2, Episode 12 of Mr. Robot.

== See also ==
- Micro Center
- PC Connection
- Best Buy
- List of defunct retailers of the United States
