= Manzoor Ul Haq Siddiqi =

Pakistani educationist, historian and author

Manzoor Ul Haq Siddiqi منظورالحق صدیقی
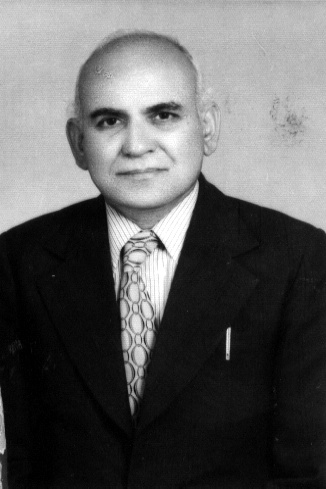
- Born: 12 April 1917; Rohtak district, Punjab, British India
- Died: 27 July 2004 (aged 87); Rawalpindi, Pakistan
- Occupations: Activist, professor, Cadet College Hasan Abdal
- Spouse: Sarwar Siddiqah 29 April 1998 (aged 70)
- Children: 6; Ahmad Mansoor, Arshad Mahmood(1948–1970), Ahmad Riza

Manzoor Ul Haq Siddiqi (Urdu:منطورالحق صدیقی; 12 April 1917 – 27 July 2004) was a Pakistani educationist, historian and an author. He served in Cadet College Hasan Abdal from 1954 until his retirement in 1980.

He served as President Muslim League Rohtak during Pakistan movement in the 1940s. Founder of Pakistan, Mohammad Ali Jinnah, Quaid-Azam (Greatest Leader) visited Rawalpindi in 1945, only one time in his lifetime on the invitation of Prof. Manzoor ul Haq Siddiqi. Acknowledging his services during Pakistan Movement, he was recipient of gold medal by Punjab Govt.

He had a large collection of books and among them included rare books also. His personal library remained attractive for researchers and historians. In Punjab region of Pakistan, in private and personal libraries was the only one got place in directory of world libraries by United Nations.

In retirement, Siddiqi's work authoring several books and educating youngsters for different boarding institutes of Pakistan was distinguished. He suffered a debilitating paralysis stroke on 24 July 2001, and died on 27 July 2004 at the age of 87.

== Background ==
M.H.Siddiqi's ancestors migrated to India during the rule of Qazi Qawam-ud-din. During the rule of Tughlaq and Mughals, many of his patriarchs were appointed on higher and honourable designations. In 1857, during the Indian Rebellion, many of his antecedents were arrested and hanged for treason and their properties were confiscated by the British because of taking part in the war against them. Siddiqi mentioned about all the history of these incidents in his book Maatherul Ajdad. His family was known for converting the Rajputs of Haryana to Islam.

== Early life ==
Siddiqi was born to IzharUllah Siddiqi and Amtul Begum on 12 April 1917 to a middle-class family in Rohtak district, India. He had two brothers: Talibullah and Shifaullah and one sister. Siddiqi completed his master's degree in arts from Punjab University and displayed prodigious talent in studies as well as in sports. Later on in 1937, he joined Punjab Muslim Students Federation and became a prominent figure. He attended the Lahore Resolution in 1940 and in 1941, and was among the key activists of Jinnah in Pakistan Conference by playing an important role under his leadership. He migrated with his family from Rohtak, India to Rawalpindi after the independence of Pakistan in 1947.

=== Political career and influence of Jinnah ===
Siddiqi had been a firm supporter of Jinnah in the Pakistan Movement. He worked side by side of Jinnah and was a member of the welcome committee of Pakistan conference which was held on 21 March 1941. In the second Muslim Student Federation rally, which was held on 8 March 1942 in Rawalpindi, Siddiqi conducted the whole rally and was the president of the Welcome Committee. He took full responsibility of the rally and during this rally he introduced a new pamphlet of Live and Let Live. This was the rally in which Muslim Student Federation was officially welcomed in Qarardad-e-Pakistan. He was also one of the 8 members of Special Pakistan conference whose soul purpose was to educate the Muslims living in the villages. He was also a member of the Pakistan Rural Propaganda Committee. This committee played a major role in establishing new branches of Muslim League in the Punjab and was among the leading parties in the rebellion against "Khizar Wazarat" in Punjab. During his visit to Rohtak, Siddiqi officially started the propaganda. During the same month, Jinnah requested Punjab's Chief Minister Sir Sikandar Hayat and other employees of Muslim League to resign from the Viceroy's National Defense Council for which the Pakistan Rural Propaganda Committee made major arrangements for the rally. This rally continued until the resignation of Sir Sikandar Hayat. Muhammad Ali Jinnah, visited Rawalpindi only once during his lifetime and that was on the invitation of then young student leader Manzoor ul Haq Siddiqui in 1945.

== Teaching career ==
After the establishment of Pakistan, Siddiqi stopped working in the political parties and instead started working for the education sector of Pakistan. In 1954, he joined Cadet College Hasan Abdal and was among the founding teachers of the college. He served as the housemaster of Haider and Auragnzeb wing during his tenure. He was also the coach of Hasanabdal's college football team. He used to teach mathematics and Urdu during his 26 years of stay in the college. He retired from Cadet College in 1980. After his retirement, he started coaching prospective students for different boarding institutions of Pakistan and was considered to be a role model for the teachers of such boarding institutes. His contributions in the field of literature and education were acknowledged and then President General Zia ul Haq awarded him with the Presidential Gold Medal.

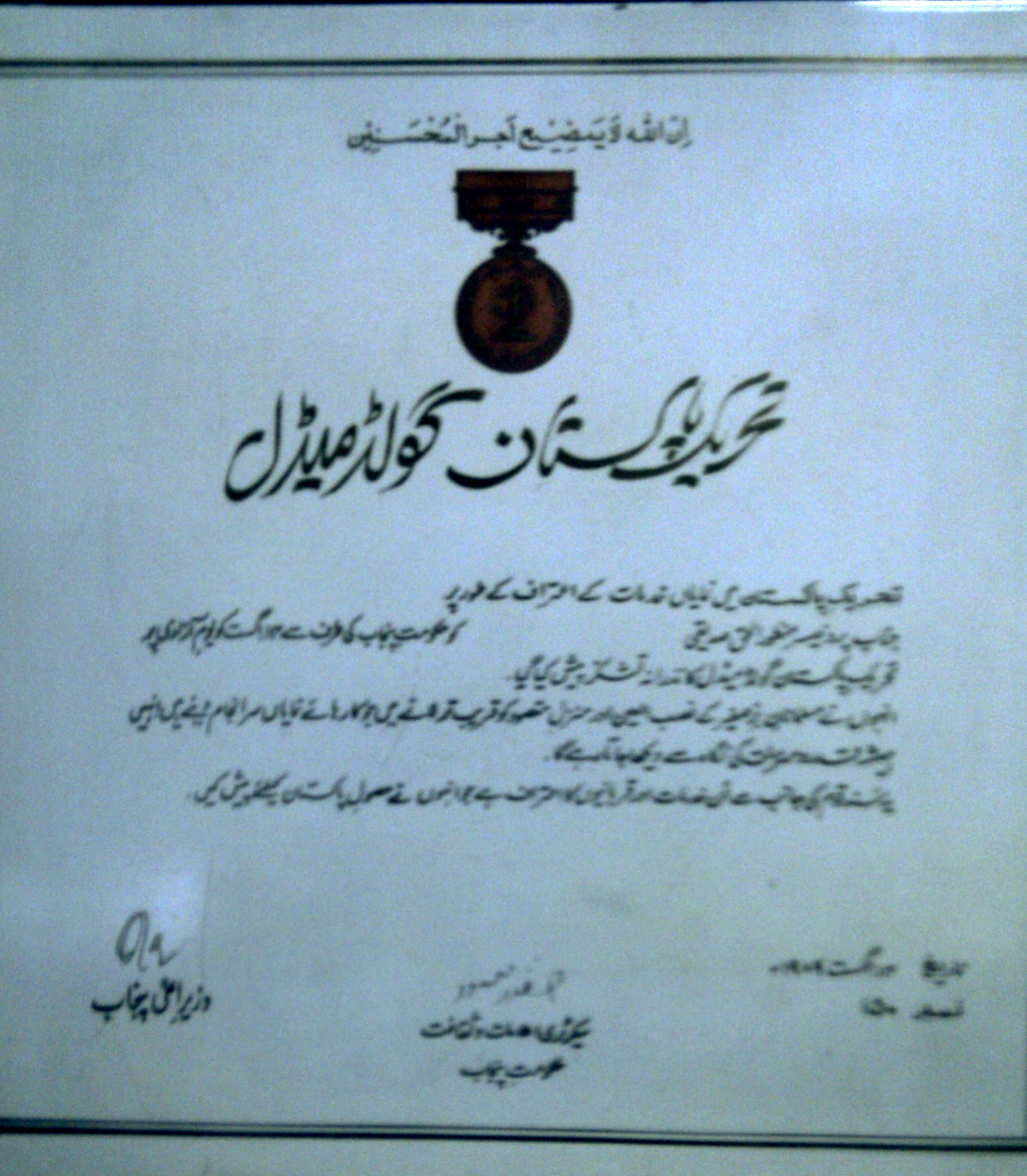
Tehreek-e-Pakistan Gold Medal

== Personal life ==
Siddiqi married Sarwar Siddiqah in 1945. They have three daughters, and two sons, Ahmad Mansoor (1946) and Ahmad Riza (1950). His son Arshad Mahmood (1948) died in a plane crash in 1970 when he was travelling from Rawalpindi to Lahore. His plane crashed near Rawat. Siddiqi was deeply hurt by the loss of his son during the tragic accident. Later on he wrote a book on Arhsad Mehmood named as Namune Ka Aik Naujawan. Personal Library of Manzoor Ul Haq Siddiqui was acknowledged as one of the great libraries in Pakistan as per the Libraries of the World published by UNICEF (Volume VIII), his library was the only private library recognised in the province of Punjab. However, Siddiqi donated entire books and documents to Archives of Govt of Pakistan a few years before. Many of his thesis and columns are present in Urdu Dairah Muarif Islamia Many of the letters sent to his forefathers by Tughlaq's and Mughals were in his personal collection which, after his paralysis, were donated to the National Archives of Pakistan by his son Ahmad Riza with the intention of the national heritage being preserved for the future generations.

== Death and legacy ==
On 24 July 2001, a rain storm wrecked everything in its path in Rawalpindi. Siddiqi suffered a severe stroke of paralysis on 24 July 2001, while he was at his son's house in Rawalpindi. He was taken to Central Military Hospital (CMH) in Rawalpindi, initially alert but unable to speak or to move his right arm or leg. After staying in paralysis for nearly three years, he slipped into a deep coma on the morning of 27 July 2004 and died in the evening on the same day, with his son Ahmad Riza at his bedside. He was 87 years old. Siddiqi's funeral took place on 28 July 2004. Siddiqi was also remembered by his students and colleagues, many of whom continued to dedicate their international research and publications to his memory. Manzoor-ul-Haq Siddiqi rests in the Army Grave Yard in Rawalpindi Cantt where his wife is also buried. He was survived by his three daughters and two sons.

== Bibliography ==
- Hadi Hariyana Shah Muhammad Ramzan Shaheed
- Quaid-e-Azam Aur Rawalpinidi
- Sallar Masood Ghazi
- Tareekh-e-Hasanabdal
- Kanza-alasar Siddiqi
- Shah Latif Burry
- Tareekh Nurpur Shahan
- Namune Ka Aik Naujawan
- Maulana Maududi
- Chand Yaadain
- Mehfil Muama goi
- Chand Aasaar
- Arfa Kashmir
- Choudhry Muhammad Sadiq Aasaar-o-Ahwaal
- Book friend
- Tehreek-e-Pakistan main Rohtak ka kirdar

== See also ==
- Siddiqui
- Cadet College Hasan Abdal
