= JS Bank =

Pakistani commercial bank

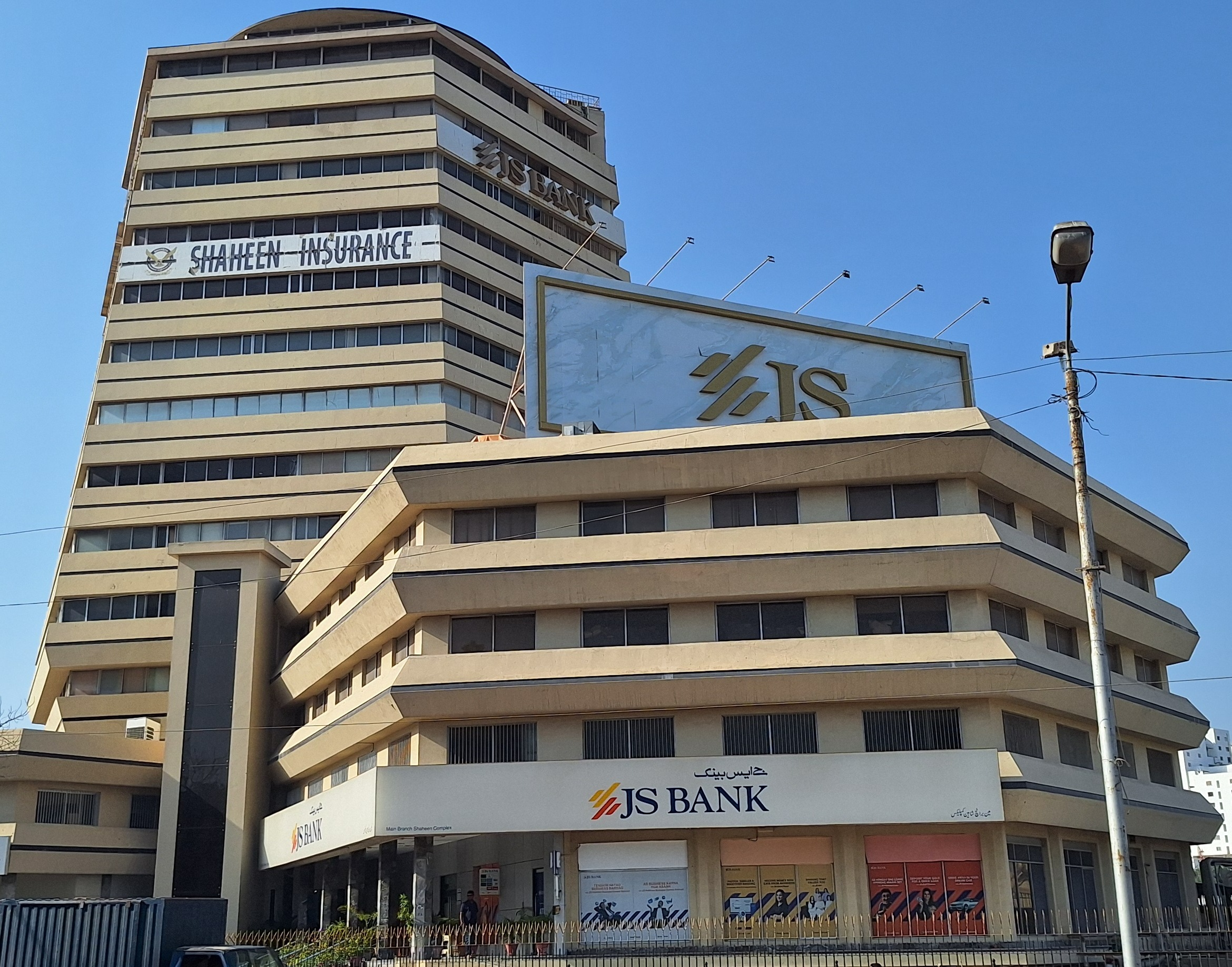
- Headquarters of JS Bank in Karachi
- Type: Public
- Traded as: PSX: JSBL
- Industry: Banking, Finance, Investment Banking
- Founded: April 2007; 19 years ago
- Founder: Jahangir Siddiqui
- Headquarters: Karachi, Pakistan
- Key people: Adil Matcheswala (Chairman); Basir Shamsie (CEO)
- Services: Consumer banking, Corporate banking, Investment banking, Investment management, Finance, Branchless banking, Business banking, Loans, Savings account, Financial product
- Revenue: ▲ Rs. 40.31 billion (US$140 million) (2025)
- Operating income: ▼ Rs. 6.19 billion (US$22 million) (2025)
- Net income: ▼ Rs. 2.79 billion (US$10 million) (2025)
- Total assets: ▲ Rs. 655.63 billion (US$2.3 billion) (2025)
- Total equity: ▲ Rs. 46.66 billion (US$170 million) (2025)
- Number of employees: 5,300 (2025)
- Parent: Jahangir Siddiqui & Co.
- Website: jsbl.com

JS Bank Limited (JSBL) (Urdu: جے ایس بینک) is a Pakistani commercial bank headquartered in Karachi. It operates as a subsidiary of Jahangir Siddiqui & Co. Limited (JSCL), a financial conglomerate in Pakistan The bank was established in April 2007 as a result of the merger of two banks, Jahangir Siddiqui Investment Bank Limited and American Express Bank. JS Bank Limited currently operates branches across Pakistan, as well as an international branch in Manama, Bahrain.

The Pakistan Credit Rating Agency Limited (PACRA) maintains the long-term entity rating of JS Bank Limited (JSBL) to ‘'AA' (Double A). Meanwhile, short-term entity rating is maintained at ‘A1+’ (A One Plus).

== History ==
JS Bank origins began with the acquisition of Citicorp Investment Bank Limited by Jahangir Siddiqui & Co. Limited on 1 February 1999 to form Jahangir Siddiqui Investment Bank Limited (JSIBL). JSIBL had a 60% stake in Citicorp giving it ownership of the organization and its operations in Pakistan. In 2007, JSIBL and American Express Bank Limited - Pakistan operations were merged, resulting in the formation of the JS Bank. Jahangir Siddiqui & Co. maintained majority shares in the new company.

JS Bank operates as a subsidiary of Jahangir Siddiqui & Co. Limited, and its shares are listed on the Pakistan Stock Exchange (PSX).

In 2016, JS Bank opened its first branch outside of Pakistan in Bahrain. In 2020, the bank rapidly grew its network and reached the PKR 400 billion deposit mark.

JS Bank holds the largest share in the disbursement of the Rozgar Refinance Scheme, amounting to PKR 10.8 billion as per State Bank of Pakistan policy.

The bank has expanded its network, reaching 293 branches across Pakistan by 2024, with its first international branch established in Manama, Bahrain, in 2016. Financially, the bank's deposit base grew from PKR 486.3 billion in December 2023 to over PKR 500 billion (US$ 1.79 billion) by March 2024.

== Products and services ==
JS Bank products include personal banking including current accounts, savings accounts, mortgages, loans, lockers, credit cards, debit cards, and digital banking. Under the umbrella of business financing, the bank provides Corporate Banking, Commercial Banking, Investment Banking, Trade and SME services.

== Operations ==
JS Bank's digital transformation initiatives include the launch of Zindigi, a mobile application targeting millennials and Gen Z users with features like nano loans, stock trading, and investment tools. JS Bank participates in the State Bank of Pakistan's Roshan Digital Account initiative, allowing non-resident Pakistanis to open bank accounts digitally. In 2023, JS Bank acquired BankIslami while maintaining separate operations.

== Penalty imposed by the State Bank of Pakistan ==
In September 2019, the State Bank of Pakistan imposed penalties on a number of local institutions including JS Bank for deficiencies in customer due diligence. The bank's departments where discrepancies were pointed out included asset quality, corporate governance, and AML/KYC. The bank was also advised timelines to enhance its processes for identification of politically exposed persons, customer risk profiling and transaction monitoring.

== See also ==
- Jahangir Siddiqui & Co.
- Banking in Pakistan
