= Ravish Siddiqi =

Urdu Poet

- Born: 1911 Saharanpur
- Died: 24 January 1971 (aged 59–60) Shahjahanpur
- Occupation: Urdu poet
- Genre: Urdu ghazal, Urdu nazam

Ravish Siddiqi (Urdu: روش صدیقی, 1911–1971), born Shahid Aziz at Jwalapur in District Saharanpur of United Provinces of Agra and Oudh on 11 July 1911 was a renowned Urdu Ghazal and Nazm writer whose forte was Romantic Poetry and Patriotic Poetry. A self-educated person he had studied and gained fluency in Urdu, Arabic, Persian, Hindi, Sanskrit and English.

== Career ==
Ravish Siddiqi worked in the All India Radio at the time when Prem Nath Dar, Saghar Nizami and Salaam Machhalishahari were also working in the same institution. Ravish Siddiqi wrote both romantic and patriotic poetry, but most of his widely acclaimed poems were written on the beauty of the Kashmir valley and people of Kashmir, a collection of these poems, Khayabaan Khayabaan, was published in late 1970s. His collection of ghazals titled Mehrab-e-Ghazal was published in 1956.

== Death ==
He died in Shahjahanpur, Uttar Pradesh, on 24 January 1971.
