= Jameela Siddiqi =

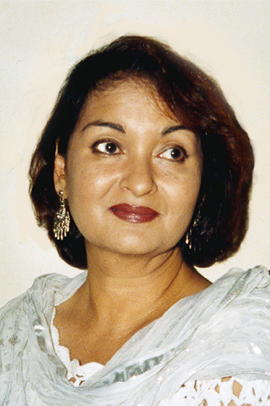
Jameela Siddiqi

Jameela Siddiqi is a London-based British novelist and journalist. She is a broadcaster, linguist and specialist in Indian classical music and poetry. Siddiqi is the author of post-colonial fiction dealing with themes of expulsion, migration identity and exile. She is also known for her work in the devotional music of Hindus, Muslims and Sikhs.

== Early life ==
Siddiqi was born to Indian parents in Mombasa, Kenya with the family moving to Kampala, Uganda in 1957 where she attended the Aga Khan School. At Independence from Britain in 1962, her family became Ugandan citizens and in 1967 moved to Jinja where she completed her secondary schooling at the Muljibhai Madhvani Girls' School.

She was an undergraduate at Kampala's Makerere University, reading history and political science, when the military dictator Idi Amin expelled all Indians from the country in 1972. She arrived in Britain as a refugee, and completed her studies at the London School of Economics and Political Science.

She was president of London University's Student Union Council for Canterbury Hall (1973–74) and a cultural officer of the Asian Students' Society (1974–75). She worked part-time on a number of television drama productions while a student.

== Work ==
Siddiqi worked as a scriptwriter, foreign news editor and documentary producer for ITN's Foreign News Agency, United Press International Television News, which became APTN. She became a freelance television producer and broadcaster in 1986 with assignments for many US networks as well as British TV companies including ITN and Channel Four News. She was a radio presenter for several BBC Radio programs, and contributed to many radio broadcasts on BBC Radio 3, Radio 4 and World Service. She was presented with a Sony Gold Award in 1998 for her BBC Radio series "Songs of the Sufi Mystics". She interviewed the qawwali maestro Ustad Nusrat Fateh Ali Khan shortly before his death in 1997. She also worked as a documentary producer for Government, Corporate and UN international agencies.

She collaborated with various musicians and musicologists for commercial and educational audio-visual projects, including Antara, an interactive tool for the study of North Indian classical music, and Maia Interactive (France, 2002).

Between 1997 and 2001, Siddiqui wrote a number of articles, as well as profiles and interview of musicians, which were published in Sufi, an international quarterly issued by the Nimatullahi Sufi Order, London and New York. Between 2004 and 2006, she wrote a series of short stories for the same magazine. Several more short stories and articles were published in other magazines. She is a regular contributor and columnist for Confluence, a journal of the South Asian Diaspora, and for Songlines, a magazine of World Music. She has also two novels and a number of non-fiction books.

Siddiqui has produced albums and compilations of Indian classical as well as film and folk music and has written liner notes for the recordings of major artists including Nusrat Fateh Ali Khan, Vilayat Khan, Ravi Shankar, Bismillah Khan, Pandit Jasraj, Shiv Kumar Sharma, Lata Mangeshkar, and Asha Bhonsle.

Sidiqqi has translated poetry from Sanskrit, Persian, Urdu, old literary Hindi dialects, Gujarati and Punjabi into English and acted as a language consultant for Oxford University Press. She has also subtitled a number of Urdu and Hindu films and TV serials as well as acting as commercial translator and voice-over artiste in three languages for international agencies.

Siddiqi trained in Indian classical dance, (Kathak) at the Academy of Indian Dance in London. Having written extensively about Indian music, she later became a university lecturer in the subject. She acted as course manager for the B.Mus.(Hons) degree in Indian Classical Music run jointly by Trinity-Laban and Bharatiya Vidya Bhavan in London from 2006 to 2011, and in 2015 is a consultant for higher education in Indian Music as well as public lecturer on Indian music history and theory. She has also acted as an educator and writer for the Darbar Festival of Indian Music.

Siddiqi writes and speaks about European history, particularly Nazi-Occupied Europe and the activities of the clandestine Special Operations Executive, and its women agents who were dropped behind enemy lines during World War 2. Her research also includes the life and work of Inayat Khan,(1882-1927), Europe's first Sufi master and the first Indian classical musician to travel to the West.

== Books ==
=== Novels ===
- The Feast of the Nine Virgins – Bogle L'Ouverture Press, London 2001
- Bombay Gardens – Lulu Inc.(USA), 2006

=== Non-Fiction ===
- World Music, The Rough Guide, eds. Broughton & Ellingham, 1994, Chapter 5.
- Revised edition, 2 volumes, 2000. "North India & Pakistan - Qawwali." Revised 2009.
- India - The Rough Guide, eds. Abram, Podger, Sen and Williams, 1994. Chapter: "The Music of India" - p. 1136
- The Religion of Music, an essay in The Intimate Other: Love Divine in Indic Religions, eds. Anna S. King and John Brockington - Orient Longman, New Delhi, 2005
- Kulbir S. Natt (ed.) Darbar Arts Culture Heritage. Chapter 2: Darbar South Asian Music Festival
