= Jahangir Siddiqui =

Pakistani businessman

- جہانگیر صدیقی
- Born: July 28, 1948 (age 78); Hyderabad, Pakistan
- Occupations: Businessman, banker
- Known for: Founder of Jahangir Siddiqui & Co. and JS Bank
- Spouse: Mahvash Siddiqui
- Children: 2, including Ali Jehangir Siddiqui
- Relatives: Sultana Siddiqui (Brother)

Jahangir Siddiqui (جہانگیر صدیقی) is a Pakistani businessman and founder of Jahangir Siddiqui & Co. and JS Bank.

== Career ==
On May 15, 1962, with the support of his family, Siddiqui became a local distributor of ice cream and Coca-Cola. In 1966, he completed a bachelor's degree in commerce, and began training as a chartered accountant in 1967. His interest in stock markets eventually led him to start his own company in October 1971. In 1971, Siddiqui founded Jahangir Siddiqui & Co. Ltd, which by growth and acquisition eventually became the JS Group of companies.

To raise money to start the company after his father's initial refusal to lend him Rs 6,000 to start a business, Siddiqui secretly stole and sold his family's car to a junk dealer for Rs1,800, along with the family's two-year stock of wheat and coal, all of which were stored in the family's house at the time. When discussing this start as a businessman, Siddiqui said, "Positive thinking distinguishes an entrepreneur from the rest of the crowd. He's never deterred by difficult circumstances." By the time he retired from the company in 2003, JS Group comprised a range of businesses with over 18,000 employees.

Siddiqui and his wife Mahvash went on to found the Mahvash & Jahangir Siddiqui Foundation, a charitable, non-profit organization focusing on healthcare, education, sustainable development through social enterprise and emergency relief in Pakistan.

== Land allegations ==
In December 2010, Siddiqui was placed on the Exit Control List (ECL) for alleged land grabbing in Karachi which alleged that Jahangir Siddiqui had illegally occupied a plot of 1,000 square yards in Karachi in connivance with the owner of an estate agency, using forged documents. Additional Executive District Officer (AEDO) Revenue Mustafa Jamal Qazi maintained that it had become a practice that land that was awarded to the government was being grabbed by "land mafia...for its vested interests." Pakistan's Anti-Corruption Establishment arrested several in conjunction with the case in December.

Siddiqui sued a group of individuals, including the Anti-Corruption Establishment director and a member of EDO Revenue for defamation, indicating that the Citizens-Police Liaison Committee had evaluated land in 2001 and found the ownership of the property legal. In response to the defamation claim, the Sindh High Court issued notices to the defendants, and they were summoned to appear before the court on 5 January 2011. The court issued a restraining order preventing the defendants from "media attack" pending settlement of the matter. The Pakistan Observer characterised these events as a "character assassination campaign" against Siddiqui.

On 29 November 2011 the court ruled that the allegations were "false and baseless" and that such cases should not be filed in the future.

== Personal life ==
He is a Sindhi whose forefathers belonged to Sehwan Sharif and his family moved to Hyderabad later. He is the brother of the television director, producer and businessperson Sultana Siddiqui, and the uncle of her son, businessman Shunaid Qureshi. Jahangir Siddiqui's son Ali Jehangir Siddiqui is also involved in the family's businesses. Another son is married to Mir Shakil-ur-Rahman's daughter.
