= Jahangir Siddiqui & Co. =

Pakistani financial services company

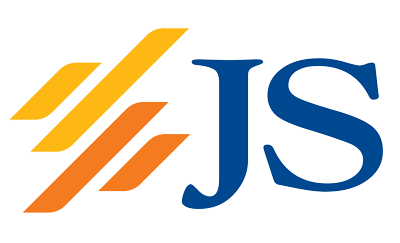
- Company type: Public
- Traded as: PSX: JSCL
- Industry: Financial services
- Founded: 1971; 55 years ago
- Founder: Jahangir Siddiqui
- Headquarters: Karachi, Sindh, Pakistan
- Area served: Pakistan
- Services: Finance and Insurance; Asset Management; Consumer Banking; Corporate Banking; Investment Banking; Investment Management; Private Equity; Venture Capital; Philanthropy
- Revenue: ▲ Rs. 149.338 billion (US$530 million) (2023)
- Net income: ▲ Rs. 8.623 billion (US$31 million) (2023)
- Total assets: ▲ Rs. 1.245 trillion (US$4.5 billion) (2023)
- Total equity: ▲ Rs. 75.189 billion (US$270 million) (2023)
- Owner: Jahangir Siddiqui Securities Services (43.89%); Jahangir Siddiqui & Sons (23.63%)
- Number of employees: 23 (2023)
- Subsidiaries: JS Infocom Limited; JS International Limited; JS Bank (71.21%); JS Global Capital Limited (66.15%); JS Investments Limited (60.22%); BankIslami Pakistan (53.49%); JS Petroleum Limited (51%)
- Website: js.com
- Footnotes / references Financials as of 31 December 2023

Jahangir Siddiqui & Co. (Urdu: جہانگیر صدیقی اینڈ کمپنی) is a Pakistani financial services company, founded in 1971 by Jahangir Siddiqui, and is based in Karachi, Pakistan. The company controls and operates financial services companies in Pakistan.

The services include asset management, commercial banking, company research, insurance, investment banking, Islamic banking, micro finance, and stock brokerage.

JS & Co. also has investments throughout Pakistan's economy, in the industrial sector, technology and media sectors, commercial real estate, energy and natural resources. JS & Co has its headquarters in Karachi.

== History ==
Jahangir Siddiqui & Co. Ltd. was incorporated in 1991 as public unquoted company. The company is listed on the Pakistan Stock Exchange (PSX).

JS Group's principal activities are trading of securities, maintaining strategic investments, consultancy services, underwriting, etc. The company has a long term rating of AA (Double A) and short term rating of A1+ (A one plus) assigned to it by Pakistan Credit Rating Agency. Jahangir Siddiqui & Co. Ltd. and its subsidiary companies are involved in trading of securities, maintaining strategic investments, investment advisory, brokerage, asset management, agency telecommunication, commercial banking, power generation and other businesses. Jahangir Siddiqui & Co posted a profit (after tax) of Rs 1,060 million in 2014.

== JS Bank ==
JS Bank is a majority-owned subsidiary of Jahangir Siddiqui & Co. Ltd. and currently operates 323 branches in 161 cities, with a total asset base of Rs 112 billion in 2014. It has a primary dealer license for government securities from the State Bank of Pakistan. According to a press release, the long-term entity rating of JS Bank Limited (JSBL) has been promoted to 'AA−’ (Double A Minus) by Pakistan Credit Rating Agency (PACRA). JS Bank was formed after the merger and amalgamation of Jahangir Siddiqui Investment Bank Limited and commercial banking operations of American Express Bank Ltd Pakistan. JS Bank Limited commenced operations in Pakistan as a fully scheduled bank on 30 December 2006. JS Bank's consolidated profits (after tax) for the year 2014 were Rs 1,060 million.

== Bank Islami ==
Dubai Bank was one of the founding shareholders of Bank Islami which invested 18.75% in the total capital. Bank Islami is the joint venture project of three groups namely Jahangir Siddiqui & Co. Pakistan, Randeree family, & Dubai Bank. The State Bank of Pakistan issued a No Objection Certificate on 19 August 2004 and Bank Islami Pakistan Limited, the second full-fledge Islamic commercial bank in Pakistan, was incorporated on 18 October 2004 in Pakistan.

In 2015, JS & Co. further invested in the bank.

== JS Air ==
JS Air (Jahangir Siddiqui Air) was a Pakistani private charter airline established in 2004, operating from Karachi Jinnah International Airport (KHI) primarily to service energy sector companies. The airline ceased operations following a fatal crash of its Beechcraft 1900C in Karachi on November 5, 2010, which killed all 21 people on board shortly after takeoff.

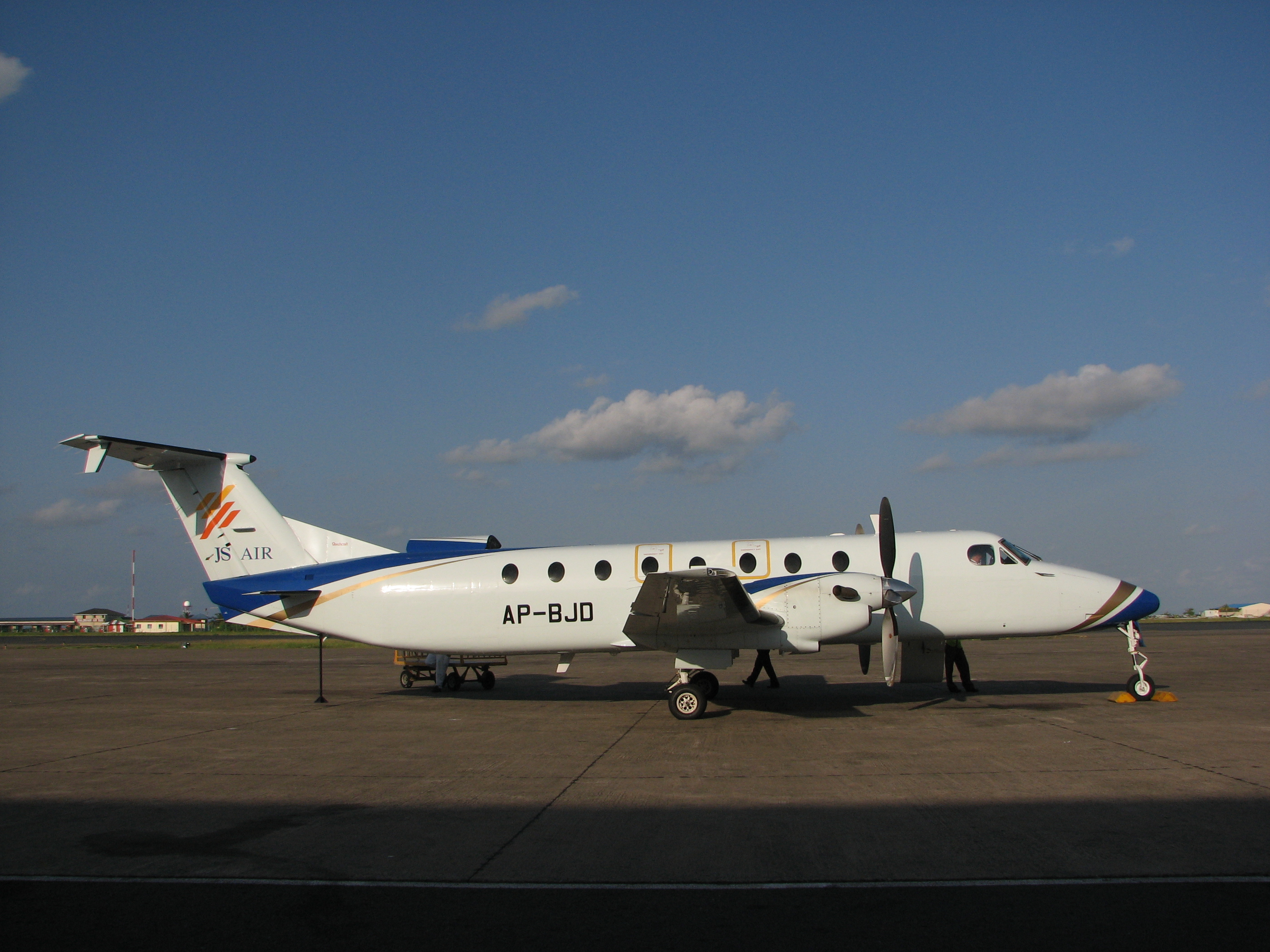
JS Air Beechcraft 1900C involved in the accident.
