= Abul Hasan Siddiqi =

Indian mathematician (1943–2020)

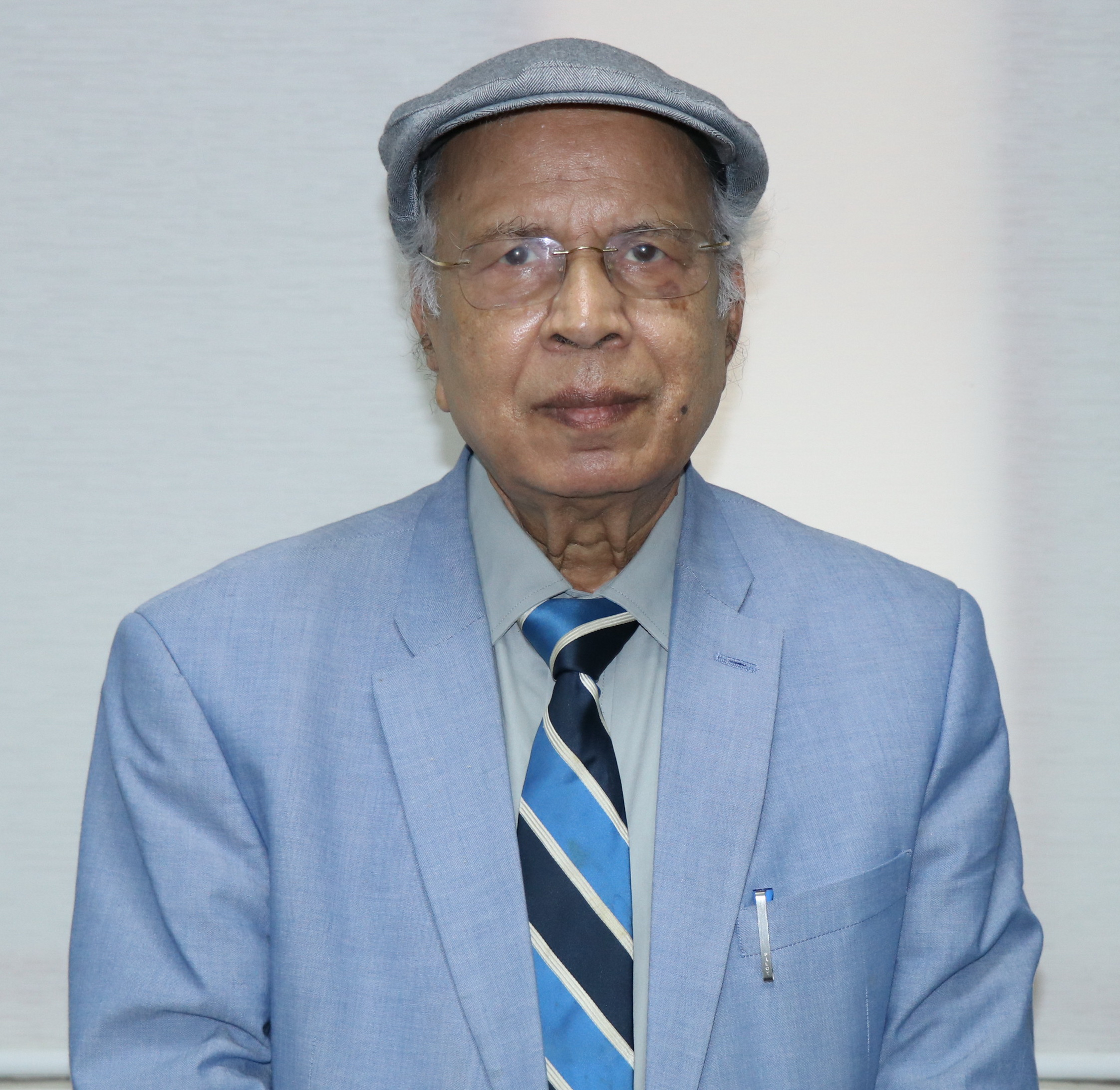
- Born: 10 January 1943; Uttar Pradesh, India
- Died: 20 January 2020 (aged 77); Uttar Pradesh, India
- Education: Gorakhpur University; Aligarh Muslim University; Heidelberg University
- Scientific career
- Fields: Mathematics; Applied mathematics
- Workplaces: Sharda University
- Doctoral advisor: Helmut Neunzert (post doctoral)

Abul Hasan Siddiqi (10 January 1943 – 20 January 2020) was an Indian mathematician and Professor of Applied Mathematics. Siddiqi was the President of Indian Society of Industrial and Applied Mathematics (ISIAM). He was Editor-in-Chief of a series of Industrial and Applied Mathematics of Springer Nature.

== Education ==
Siddiqi completed his education up to Bachelor of Sciences at St. Andrews High School and St. Andrews Degree College affiliated with Gorakhpur University, India. He joined Aligarh Muslim University in 1960 to pursue an M.Sc. Mathematics. Siddiqi was promoted to Doctorate from Aligarh Muslim University in 1967 under the supervision of Jamil A. Siddiqi. Siddiqi undertook post doctoral studies at Heidelberg University under the guidance of Horst Leptin (1971–72) as a fellow of German Academic Exchange Service.

== Career ==
Siddiqi served the Aligarh Muslim University in different capacities between 1965 and 1998 such as Professor of Applied Mathematics and Chairman Department of Mathematics, Provost of a Prestigious Hall of Residence, Member-in-Charge AMU Press, Dean of the Faculty of Science, Chief Election Officer of the AMU and AMU students' union. He had held visiting assignments in different parts of the world including USA, Canada, Germany, Iran, Algeria, Saudi Arabia, Oman and Malaysia. From December 1973 to August 1975 Siddiqi was visiting professor at the University of Tabriz, Iran. From October 1980 to April 1983 he was visiting professor at Constantine University, Algeria. From October 1998 to April 2007 Siddiqi was employed as Professor of Mathematics at the King Fahd University of Petroleum and Minerals, Saudi Arabia.

Siddiqi had also served Gautam Buddha University from 15 October 2011 to 9 January 2013 and contributed significantly to its development.

== Fellowships ==
Siddiqi was awarded a German Academic Exchange Service (DAAD) Fellowship in 1971 for postdoctoral work at Institute of Applied Mathematics at Heidelberg University for a period of eighteen months. He was also awarded DAAD revisit fellowships during 1989 and 1997 to work at the Institute of Industrial and Business Mathematics, University of Kaiserslautern, for period of three months, each time.

Siddiqi was also awarded regular Associateship of the International Centre for Theoretical Physics (ICTP) in Trieste, Italy, on the basis of worldwide competition for the period of 1992 to 1997. He was also awarded senior associateship on the basis of worldwide competition for the period of 2001 to 2006. Siddiqi was nominated as the ICTP consultant to Istanbul Aydin University, Turkey for the period of 2007 to 2010.

== Bibliography ==
=== As editor-in-chief ===
- Series of Industrial Applied Mathematics of Springer Nature ^{[3]}
- Indian Journal of Industrial and Applied Mathematics- A Publication of Indian Society of Industrial and Applied Mathematics

=== As author ===
- Yu. A Farkov, P Manchanda, A H Siddiqi, Construction of Wavelets Through Walsh Functions, 2019, Springer Nature, ISBN 978-981-13-6369-6.
- M Brokate, P Manchanda, A H Siddiqi, Calculus for Scientists and engineers, Springer Nature,ISBN 978-981-13-8463-9
- A H Siddiqi, Functional Analysis and Applications, Springer Nature, 2018, ISBN 978-981-10-3725-2
- A H Siddiqi, M Al-Lawati and M Boulbrachene, Modern Engineering Mathematics, CRC Press, 2018, ISBN 978-1-4987-1205-7,
- K. Adzievski and A H Siddiqi, Introduction to Partial Differential Equations for Scientist and Engineers using Mathematica, Chapman & Hall/CRC Press, Taylor and Francis Group, U.S. 162013, ISBN 9781466510562,
- A H Siddiqi, Applied Functional Analysis: Numerical Methods, Wavelet Methods, Marcel Dekker, 2003, ISBN 978-0824740979,
- Helmut Neunzert and A H Siddiqi, Topics in Industrial Mathematics, Case Studies and Related Mathematical Methods. Kluwer Academic Publishers, Boston-Dordrecht-London, 2000, ISBN 978-1-4757-3222-1,

=== As editor ===
- P Manchanda, R Lozi and AH Siddiqi, Industrial Mathematics and Complex Systems: Emerging Mathematical Models, Methods and Algorithms, Springer Nature, 2017, ISBN 978-981-10-3758-0.
- M Brokate and AH Siddiqi, Functional Analysis with Current Applications in Science, Technology and Industry, Pitman Research Note in Mathematics series, Vol. 377, Addison Wesley Longman, U.K. 1997, 2nd edition 2015, ISBN 978-0582312609.
- A H Siddiqi, Emerging Applications of Wavelet Methods, Vol. 1463, American Institute of Physics (AIP), USA, 2014.
- A H Siddiqi, P Manchanda and Rashmi Bhardwaj, Mathematical Methods, Models and Applications, 2015, Springer Nature, ISBN 978-981-287-973-8.
- A H Siddiqi, A K Gupta & M Brokate, Modelling of Engineering and Technological Problems, American Institute of Physics, 2009, ISBN 978-0-7354-0683-4.
