= Asif Mumtaz =

Pakistani cricketer (born 1988)

Personal information
- Full name: Asif Mumtaz
- Born: 3 October 1988 (age 37); Sialkot, Punjab, Pakistan
- Batting: Right-handed
- Bowling: Right arm off break
- Source: Cricinfo, 4 March 2020

Asif Mumtaz (born 3 October 1988) is a Pakistani cricketer. He made his first-class debut for Rawalpindi in the 2009–10 Quaid-e-Azam Trophy on 3 December 2009. He made his List A debut for Rawalpindi Rams in the 2010-11 National One Day Championship on 30 January 2011.
