= Prem Nath Dar =

Indian short story writer

Prem Nath Dar (25 July 1914 – 6 September 1976) was an Urdu-language short story writer from the Kashmir Valley. His short stories are generally recognised as progressive writings of the mid-20th century.

== Transformation to a short story writer ==
In the early 1940s, while in Delhi, he got in touch with Urdu literary circle Halqa-e Arbab-e Zauq, and started writing short stories in Urdu. The writers of Halqae Arbab Zauq used to meet at his house in Sita Ram Bazaar which was attended by some known writers of that time, including Devendra Satyarthi, Josh Malihabadi, Arsh Malciani Jagan Nath, Sagar Nizami, and Rewati Sharan Sharma. The venue later changed to Delhi College, Delhi. After the 1960s, his responsibilities at All India Radio kept him occupied, leaving less time for literary activities.

== Writing style ==
His writings like the other progressive writers of India, were influenced by socio-political movements and the existing social structure of that time in India.

Prem Nath Dar's first collection of short stories, Kaghaz Ka Vasudev aur dighar afsaaney (ISBN 978-93-5160-047-3), was the reprinted by National Council for Urdu Promotion. It was an instant success and was appreciated by leading Urdu writers of that time from India - Salahuddin Ahamad, Syyed Ahtesshan Hussein, Josh Malihabadi and Pakistan - Maulana Salahuddin Ahamad, editor Adabi Duniya, Lahore. This collection of short stories is now reprinted by the National Council for Promotion of Urdu Language. His collection of short stories, unpublished during his lifetime was published later on by Maktaba Jamia New Delhi titled Betaal Lamhe (ISBN 978-93-8299743-6).
