= Ausaf Umar Siddiqui =

Pakistani businessman

Ausaf Umar Siddiqui (born 1966) also known as Omar Siddiqui, is a Pakistani-American former corporate executive who was a vice president of Fry's Electronics. He is known to have gambled over $162 million in Las Vegas from 2005 to 2008 after embezzling money from his employer through money-laundering and wire fraud. He pled guilty and declared bankruptcy in 2011 after remaining listed as $137 million in debt.

== Business background ==
Siddiqui was hired by Fry's Electronics in 1988. Omar was eventually promoted to vice president of merchandising and operations. He received an annual salary of $225,000. Siddiqui negotiated with suppliers to pay higher prices in exchange for kickbacks which amounted to as much as 31%. He set up a shell company PC International, which hid the $65.6 million in kickbacks.

== Gambling ==
Siddiqui reportedly wire transferred $70.4 million to The Venetian Las Vegas between 2005 and 2008. He was known by casino employees as a "blackjack machine", according to one casino industry veteran "you couldn’t deal fast enough". Siddiqui gambled so fast he would "red line the house limit". Siddiqui was also known as a lavish spender who enjoyed fast cars, bottles of Dom Perignon Rose and bowls of Glitterati Mentissimo peppermints.

According to IRS Agent Andres Gonzalez, Siddiqui spent $162 million at MGM Grand Las Vegas and Las Vegas Sands casinos. Suspicion began in 2005, when an employee saw "confidential spreadsheets, letters and extraordinarily high commission amounts on Siddiqui’s desk". Siddiqui had claimed he was a co-owner of the company. One company, Phoebe Micro of Fremont, claimed it was the victim of Siddiqui. General manager, Peter Liu said Siddiqui asked to pay a "high marketing fee so Fry’s would prominently display Phoebe’s products".

Siddiqui is considered among the largest losers in casino gambling history. He was sentenced to six years in prison for his crimes after he pled guilty to "one count of wire fraud and one count of money laundering" in a plea deal where the government agreed to drop seven other felonies.
