= Sultana Siddiqui =

Media entrepreneur

- سلطانه صديقي
- Born: Hyderabad, Sindh, Pakistan
- Other name: Sultana Apa
- Occupations: TV director; producer; businessperson
- Known for: President and Founder of Hum Network Limited
- Notable work: 3
- Relatives: Jahangir Siddiqui (brother); Momina Duraid (daughter-in-law); Ali Jehangir Siddiqui (nephew); Sheheryar Munawar (nephew)

Sultana Siddiqui (Sindhi: سلطانه صديقي), also known as Sultana Apa (سلطانہ آپا), is a Pakistani media mogul, television director, and producer who is the founder of Hum Network Limited.

Siddiqui is an active director of Hum Network Limited and the president of Hum Network Limited. By virtue of that she became the first woman in Pakistan to establish a TV station.

== Early life ==
Sultana was born in Hyderabad, Sindh, into a Sindhi qazis (Muslim judges) family living there, Sultana being the seventh of ten children. She received her early education from government schools in Hyderabad.

"Siddiqui was a tomboy. She would climb trees, challenge bullies and at times play truant. People who know her from those heady days say that she was the undisputed leader of kids in the neighbourhood".

She aimed to do her Master's in comparative religion but stopped due to her marriage in 1966, which would end in a divorce after 7 years, and she would return to her family home with her three sons.

Her brother, Mazhar-ul-Haq Siddiqui, was a civil servant and also served as the Board of director of Hum Network Limited died in February 2026.

== Career ==
=== 1970s-1980s: Early work as actress and director-producer ===
Sultana started her career from PTV as a producer in Karachi in 1974. Following a brief acting career, she concentrated on direction and production in both Sindhi and Urdu, her first Urdu-language production being Rung Barung (1981), a musical show for kids.

=== 1990s: Mainstream success ===
Siddiqui directed Sindhi play Marvi, which was written by Noorul Huda Shah and starred Sakina Samo as Marvi. The commercial success of the series motivate Siddiqui to adapt the series in Urdu, in which Ghazal Siddique played Marvi, a rural girl who manages to get the education in the city despite the obstacles. Sultana reached popular success with the series and since then has directed or produced many appreciated television serials. Siddiqui has also produced children's television, musical performances, television films, serials and documentaries.

=== 2000s-now: Hum Network and return to direction ===
In 2004 she founded Eye Television Network, now known as under which her own four cable channels are working, including "Hum TV". Under her direction Hum TV has received Pakistan's Lux Style Awards four years in a row. She is the only woman in Asia who started or owned a TV channel.

In 2003, Siddiqui produced the series Kismet Kay Sitaray: Sachi Kahanian, an anthology of real-life inspirational stories of women which were scripted by different writers including Noorul Huda Shah and Asghar Nadeem Syed.

As a director, she remained inactive for ten years before her latest drama serial Zindagi Gulzar Hai (2012-2013), which is a romantic drama focusing on women, portraying equality of the girl child and importance of a career for women. a critically acclaimed serial that has been praised for "breaking the ice across the borders of Pakistan and India in current times" featuring Fawad Khan and Sanam Saeed.

In 2025, Sultana Siddiqui resides in North Nazimabad Town in Karachi, Pakistan. She is now reportedly in her late 70s. She launched Hum TV in 2005. Sultana Siddiqui's TV shows tend to portray progressive and women-empowering point of view.

== Awards and recognition ==
- Sitara-e-Imtiaz (Star of Excellence) Award in 2021 by the President of Pakistan.

Sultana has won numerous awards, including the Best Producer of a Drama Serial, Best Producer of a Music Production, the Hazrat Khadijat ul Kubra Award, Women of Vision Award, Nigar Award, the Gold Medal Award, Sindh Graduates Association Award,

- Pride of Performance Award from the Government of Pakistan in 2008.

Her work is well known for its attention to social issues and its focus on female empowerment. Siddiqui has represented Pakistan in numerous international workshops and seminars.

- PTV Award for 'Best Production' in 1981.
- Lifetime Achievement awarded in 2023 from Organization of Pakistani Entrepreneurs of North America. In 2023, Sultana Siddiqui was awarded the Lifetime Achievement Award by the Organization of Pakistani Entrepreneurs of Silicon Valley Chapter for her contributions to women's entrepreneurship, the establishment of one of Pakistan's leading media companies, and her role as a mentor to women internationally.
- In July 2025, Sultana Siddiqui was honored at the 48th Annual Convention of the Association of Physicians of Pakistani Descent of North America (APPNA) in Dallas, Texas. She received the APPNA Women Empowerment Award 2025, recognizing her contributions to women's empowerment and her leadership in the media industry.
- In August 2025, Sultana Siddiqui was conferred an honorary doctorate by Buckinghamshire New University (UK) in recognition of her contributions to media, women's empowerment, and public service. The degree was presented during a ceremony in UK, where university and diplomatic representatives praised her pioneering leadership as a media entrepreneur and her impact on cultural representation and female mentorship.

== Other work ==
=== Public speaking ===
As a public speaker, Sultana has spoken on many local and international platforms, including the 2013 US Islamic World Forum held in Doha, Qatar and the 2014 Women Leadership Forum held in Silicon Valley, California.

=== Karachi Film Society ===
Siddiqui founded the Karachi Film Society (KFS) in 2017. The nonprofit society hosts seminars, workshops, and festivals to promote film and drive the Pakistani film industry in new and creative ways. KFS is also the parent body of the Pakistan International Film Festival (PIFF).

=== Fashion ===
In 2018, Sultana Siddiqui collaborated with Zac Chaudhri from the University of The Arts London to produce the first set of books on Pakistani Fashion to be held in a major western Arts university library. The books are titled Fashion Uncovered and are an introduction to Pakistani Fashion.

== New talent discoveries on television ==
Sultana Siddiqui is credited for first discovering:

- Abida Parveen, noted Pakistani folk singer
- Sakina Samo, TV actress, producer and director
- Mahnoor Baloch, TV actress

== Selected television serials ==
Year	Title	Director	Producer	Network	Ref.
1992	Zara Si Aurat	Yes		PTV	
1993	Marvi	Yes		PTV	
1997	Yeh Zindagi	Yes		PTV	
1999	Doosri Dunya	Yes		PTV	
2000	Aur Zindagi Badalti Hai		Yes	PTV	
2001	Wafa Kay Mausam		Yes	PTV	
2002	Jannat		Yes	PTV	
2003	Shayad Kay Bahar Aaye		Yes	PTV	
2004	Anjaane Raaste		Yes	PTV	
2012	Zindagi Gulzar Hai	Yes		Hum TV	
2016	Udaari		Yes	Hum TV	
2024	Mann Jogi		Yes	Hum TV	
2024	Nadaan		Yes	Hum TV	
2024	Tan Man Neel o Neel		Yes	Hum TV	
