= KMI 30 Index =

Pakistani stock market index

KMI 30 Index شاخص کے ایم آئی ۳۰
- Foundation: 2 September 2008
- Operator: Karachi Stock Exchange Limited
- Exchanges: Karachi Stock Exchange
- Constituents: 30
- Weighting method: Capitalization-weighted index

KMI 30 Index is a stock market index on the Pakistan Stock Exchange in Pakistan of thirty companies that have been screened for Islamic Shariah criteria. The index was introduced on 2 September 2008, and the base period for this Islamic index is 30 June 2008. It was created as a joint effort by the Karachi Stock Exchange (now known as Pakistan Stock Exchange) and Al-Meezan Investment Bank (now known as Meezan Bank Limited).

The index is calculated using free float market capitalization. At any point in time, the level of the index reflects the free float market value of selected Shariah-compliant shares in comparison with the base period. KMI-30 is recomposed semi-annually.

== Selection criteria ==
For any stock to be "Shariah compliant" it must meet all of the following six criteria:

1. Core business of the company must be halal
2. Interest-bearing debt to total assets should be less than 37%
3. Illiquid assets to total assets should be greater than 25%
4. Net liquid assets per share should be less than the market share price
5. Non-compliant investments to total assets should be less than 33%
6. Non-compliant income to total revenue should be less than 5%

== Constituents ==
=== Current (as of 31 December 2025) ===
- Air Link Communication Limited
- Attock Refinery
- Citi Pharma Limited
- Cnergyico PK Limited
- DG Cement
- Engro Fertilizers
- Engro Holdings
- Fauji Cement
- Fauji Fertilizer Company Limited
- Fauji Foods
- Ghandhara Industries
- Ghandhara Automobiles Limited
- GlaxoSmithKline Pakistan
- Hub Power Company
- Lucky Cement
- Mari Energies
- Meezan Bank
- Maple Leaf Cement
- Millat Tractors
- National Refinery Limited
- Oil & Gas Development Company
- Pak Elektron
- Pakistan Petroleum
- Pakistan Refinery Limited
- Pakistan State Oil
- Sazgar Engineering Works
- Sui Southern Gas Company Limited
- The Searle Company Limited
- Sui Northern Gas Pipelines Limited
- Systems Limited

=== Former ===
- Air Link Communication
- Cherat Cement Company Limited
- Dolmen City REIT
- Interloop Limited
- K-Electric
- National Refinery Limited
- Nishat Mills Limited
- Shell Pakistan Limited
- TPL Properties Limited
- Unity Foods

== See also ==
- KSE-30
- KSE-100
