= PSX Dividend 20 Index =

Pakistani stock market index

- Foundation: 2022; 3 years ago
- Operator: Pakistan Stock Exchange Limited
- Exchanges: Pakistan Stock Exchange
- Constituents: 20
- Type: Large
- Weighting method: Dividend yield
- Related indices: KSE 100 Index; KSE 30 Index; KMI 30 Index
- Website: www.psx.com.pk

The PSX Dividend 20 Index is a stock index acting as a benchmark to compare prices on the Pakistan Stock Exchange (PSX) over a period. PSX Dividend 20 Index benchmark top 20 dividend paying companies at PSX based on the last 12-month dividend yield.

== History ==
From October 2020, PSX Dividend 20 Index was in test run at PSX.

== See also ==
- KSE 30 Index
- KSE 100 Index
- KMI 30 Index
- Central Depository Company
