= KSE 100 Index =

Pakistani stock market index

KSE 100 Index شاخص کے ایس ای ۱۰۰
- Foundation: 1991; 35 years ago
- Operator: Pakistan Stock Exchange Limited
- Exchanges: Pakistan Stock Exchange
- Constituents: 100
- Type: Large
- Weighting method: Capitalization-weighted index
- Related indices: KSE-30 Index; KMI 30 Index
- Website: psx.com.pk

The KSE-100 Index is a total return stock index acting as a benchmark to compare prices on the Pakistan Stock Exchange (PSX) over a period.

In determining representative companies to compute the index on, companies with the highest market capitalization are selected. However, to ensure full market representation, the company with the highest market capitalization from each sector is also included.

== History ==
KSE 100 Index was launched in November 1991 with a base of 1,000 points.

In November 1994, Baring Securities London recomposed the index and established rules for its recomposition.

=== Steady growth ===
In 2001, the Karachi Stock Exchange (KSE) became the highest-performing stock market globally, supported by macroeconomic policies that increased foreign exchange reserves above five billion dollars and strengthened the rupee. Daily trading volumes reached approximately 200 million shares. The market's positive trajectory was temporarily affected by military tensions following an attack on the Indian parliament. Intervention by U.S. Secretary of State Colin Powell and actions against militant groups by President Pervez Musharraf helped stabilize the situation. As a result, the KSE index rose by nearly 400 points, and the market capitalization reached 400 billion rupees.

By February 2007, it had skyrocketed to 12,285 points.

=== 2007 (Record growth) ===
KSE-100 index touched the highest ever benchmark of 14,814 points on December 26, 2007, a day before the assassination of former Prime Minister Benazir Bhutto, when the index nosedived.

=== 2008 Global crisis ===
- April 20: Karachi Stock Exchange achieved a major milestone when KSE-100 Index crossed the psychological level of 15,000 for the first time in its history and peaked 15,737.32 on 20 April 2008. Moreover, the increase of 7.4 per cent in 2008 made it the best performer among major emerging markets.
- May 23: Record high inflation in the month of May, 2008 resulted in the unexpected increase in the interest rates by State Bank of Pakistan which eventually resulted in sharp fall in Karachi Stock Exchange.
- July 17: Angry investors attacked the Karachi Stock Exchange in protest at plunging Pakistani share prices.
- July 16: KSE-100 Index dropped one-third from an all-time high hit in April, 2008 as rising pressure on shaky Pakistan's coalition government to tackle Taliban militants exacerbates concern about the country's economic woes.
- August 18: KSE 100 Index rose more than 4% after the announcement of the resignation of President Pervez Musharraf but Credit Suisse Group said that Pakistan's Post-Musharraf rally in Stock Exchange will be short-lived because of a rising fiscal deficit and runaway inflation.
- August 28 : Karachi Stock Exchange set a floor for stock prices to halt a plunge that has wiped out $36.9 billion of market value since April.
- December 15: Trading resumes after the removal of floor on stock prices that was set on August 28 to halt sharp falls.

=== 2013-2014 (Post-Elections) ===
As of April 30, KSE-100 Index recorded a new increase in its value standing at 28,913 points, that is more than 45.2% since the last fiscal year of 2012–2013.

=== 2016 (Reaching new heights) ===
By the month of June, KSE-100 was in positive conditions and it achieved 38,777 points on 17 June 2016.

=== 2017 (All-time high) ===
In January 2017, the stock market hit the all-time high of 49,969 points. On 13 February, it stands at 49,876 points.

Pakistan qualified for the popular MSCI Emerging Markets Index in May 2017, an upgrade from Morgan Stanley Capital International's (MSCI) Frontier Market (FM) index.

On 25 May 2017, the KSE-100 index reached the all-time high of 53,124 points, later it tanked to 37,919 points in a matter of seven months.

Following Britain's decision to leave EU on 24 June, KSE dropped 1,100 points (3.1 percent) as stock markets went in turmoil as investors sought safe havens like gold and government bonds.

=== 2020 (COVID-19) ===
The first case of COVID-19 in Pakistan was reported on 26 February 2020. Its impact resulted in the fall of around 62% of KSE-100 index, lowest at 27,200 on March 25, 2020, from the high of 43,218 points on January 13, 2020. Despite the fall greater than 2005 and 2008 crisis, The market remained calm and confident, and no investors have made accusations of market manipulations and unfair trading.

=== 2024 ===
On 4 October 2024, the KSE-100 index gained 810.19 points, or 0.98 percent, during the session and closing at a record high of 83,531.96 points.

=== 2026 ===
On 2 March, the KSE 100 index witnessed a market halt and recorded its largest-ever single-day decline, losing 16,089 points, or 9.57%, to close at 151,973 points.

== Constituents ==
=== Current ===
Ticker	Logo	Company	PSX sector	Index weighting (%)^{1}
PSX: ABOT		Abbott	Pharmaceuticals	0.40
PSX: AICL		Adamjee Insurance	Insurance	0.32
PSX: AGP	—	AGP Limited	Pharmaceuticals	0.33
PSX: AIRLINK	—	Air Link Communication	Technology & Communication	0.33
PSX: ABL		Allied Bank	Commercial Banks	0.41
PSX: AHCL		Arif Habib Corp	Investment Banks / Investment Companies / Securities Companies	0.19
PSX: AKBL		Askari Bank	Commercial Banks	0.92
PSX: ATLH		Atlas Honda	Automobile Assembler	0.41
PSX: APL		Attock Petroleum	Oil & Gas Marketing Companies	0.34
PSX: ATRL		Attock Refinery	Refinery	0.77
PSX: AVN		Avanceon	Technology & Communication	—
PSX: BAHL		Bank AL Habib	Commercial Banks	2.85
PSX: BAFL		Bank Alfalah	Commercial Banks	1.61
PSX: BOP		Bank of Punjab	Commercial Banks	0.93
PSX: BNWM	—	Bannu Woollen Mills	Woollen	0.01
PSX: BWCL		Bestway Cement	Cement	0.59
PSX: CHCC	—	Cherat Cement	Cement	0.72
PSX: CPHL	—	Citi Pharma	Pharmaceuticals	0.17
PSX: CNERGY	—	Cnergyico	Refinery	0.27
PSX: COLG		Colgate-Palmolive Pakistan	Food & Personal Care Products	0.60
PSX: DGKC	—	DG Cement	Cement	0.91
PSX: DHPL		DH	Investment Banks / Investment Companies / Securities Companies	—
PSX: DCR	—	Dolmen City	Real Estate Investment Trust	0.43
PSX: ENGROH		Engro Holdings	Investment Banks / Investment Companies / Securities Companies	4.98
PSX: EFERT		Engro Fertilizers	Fertilizer	2.31
PSX: FATIMA		Fatima Fertilizer Company	Fertilizer	0.99
PSX: FCCL		Fauji Cement	Cement	0.92
PSX: FFC		Fauji Fertilizer Company	Fertilizer	8.73
PSX: FFL		Fauji Foods	Food & Personal Care Products	0.17
PSX: FABL		Faysal Bank	Commercial Banks	1.05
PSX: HALEON		Haleon Pakistan	Pharmaceuticals	0.24
PSX: FHAM	—	First Habib Modarba	Modarabas	0.06
PSX: GADT	—	Gadoon Textile Mills	Textile Spinning	0.05
PSX: GAL		Ghandhara Automobiles	Automobile Assembler	0.26
PSX: GHNI		Ghandhara Industries	Automobile Assembler	0.34
PSX: GHGL	—	Ghani Glass	Glass & Ceramics	0.27
PSX: GLAXO		GSK	Pharmaceuticals	0.46
PSX: HBL		HBL	Commercial Banks	3.57
PSX: HMB		HabibMetro	Commercial Banks	1.08
PSX: HGFA	—	HBL Growth Fund	Close-End Mutual Funds	0.09
PSX: HINOON	—	Highnoon	Pharmaceuticals	0.42
PSX: HCAR		Honda Atlas	Automobile Assembler	0.14
PSX: HUBC		Hubco	Power Generation & Distribution	4.24
PSX: HUMNL	—	Hum Network	Technology & Communication	0.08
PSX: IBFL	—	Ibrahim Fibre	Synthetic & Rayon	0.09
PSX: JDWS	—	JDW Sugar Mills	Sugar & Allied Industries	0.16
PSX: INDU		Indus Motor	Automobile Assembler	0.55
PSX: ILP		Interloop Limited	Textile Composite	0.56
PSX: INIL	—	International Industries Limited	Engineering	0.20
PSX: ISL		International Steels Limited	Engineering	0.25
PSX: JVDC		Javedan	Property	0.55
PSX: KEL		K-Electric	Power Generation & Distribution	0.41
PSX: KOHC	—	Kohat Cement	Cement	0.45
PSX: KTML	—	Kohinoor Textile	Textile Composite	0.25
PSX: KAPCO		Kot Addu Power	Power Generation & Distribution	0.25
PSX: LOTCHEM		Lotte Chemical	Chemical	0.22
PSX: LUCK		Lucky Cement	Cement	3.91
PSX: LCI		Lucky Core Industries	Chemical	0.43
PSX: MLCF	—	Maple Leaf Cement	Cement	0.90
PSX: MARI		Mari Energies	Oil & Gas Exploration Companies	3.13
PSX: MCB		MCB Bank	Commercial Banks	3.33
PSX: MEBL		Meezan Bank	Commercial Banks	4.87
PSX: MEHT	—	Mehmood Textile Mills	Textile Composite	0.08
PSX: MTL		Millat Tractors	Automobile Assembler	1.04
PSX: MUREB	—	Murree Brewery	Food & Personal Care Products	0.20
PSX: NBP	—	National Bank	Commercial Banks	2.08
PSX: NATF		National Foods	Food & Personal Care Products	0.45
PSX: NESTLE		Nestlé Pakistan	Food & Personal Care Products	0.69
PSX: OGDC		OGDC	Oil & Gas Exploration Companies	4.10
PSX: PKGS		Packages Limited	Paper, Board & Packaging	0.28
PSX: PAEL		PEL	Cable & Electrical Goods	0.42
PSX: PGLC	—	Pak-Gulf Leasing	Leasing Companies	0.00
PSX: PABC	—	Pakistan Aluminium Beverage Cans	Miscellaneous	0.11
PSX: PIBTL	—	PIBTL	Transport	0.27
PSX: POWER	—	Power Cement	Cement	0.19
PSX: POL	—	Pakistan Oilfields	Oil & Gas Exploration Companies	1.76
PSX: PPL	—	Pakistan Petroleum	Oil & Gas Exploration Companies	2.94
PSX: PSEL	—	Pakistan Services	Miscellaneous	0.56
PSX: PSO		Pakistan State Oil	Oil & Gas Marketing Companies	1.63
PSX: PSX	—	Pakistan Stock Exchange	Investment Banks / Investment Companies / Securities Companies	0.50
PSX: PTC	—	PTCL	Technology & Communication	0.84
PSX: PAKT		Pakistan Tobacco Company	Tobacco	0.36
PSX: PIOC	—	Pioneer Cement	Cement	0.19
PSX: RMPL		Rafhan Maize	Food & Personal Care Products	0.09
PSX: SAZEW		Sazgar	Automobile Assembler	0.84
PSX: SEARL		Searle	Pharmaceuticals	0.54
PSX: SRVI		Servis	Leather & Tanneries	0.97
PSX: SHFA		Shifa	Miscellaneous	0.30
PSX: WAFI		Wafi	Oil & Gas Marketing Companies	—
PSX: SCBPL		Standard Chartered	Commercial Banks	0.25
PSX: SNGP	—	Sui Northern	Oil & Gas Marketing Companies	0.55
PSX: SSGC	—	Sui Southern	Oil & Gas Marketing Companies	0.19
PSX: SYS		Systems Limited	Technology & Communication	2.62
PSX: TGL		Tariq Glass	Glass & Ceramics	0.26
PSX: THALL	—	Thal Limited	Automobile Parts & Accessories	0.38
PSX: TRG		TRG Pakistan	Technology & Communication	0.43
PSX: UPFL		Unilever Foods	Food & Personal Care Products	0.26
PSX: UBL		UBL	Commercial Banks	8.16
PSX: YOUW	—	Yousuf Weaving Mills	Textile Weaving	0.01

=== Former ===
- Adamjee Insurance
- Archroma Pakistan
- Air Link Communication
- Aisha Steel
- Atlas Honda
- BankIslami Pakistan
- Century Paper & Board Mills
- Dewan Textile Mills
- Gadoon Textile Mills
- Habib Sugar Mills
- Hascol Petroleum
- Hinopak Motors
- Honda Atlas Cars
- Jahangir Siddiqui & Co.
- Jubilee Life Insurance
- Kohinoor Textile Mills
- Lotte Chemicals Pakistan
- Pak Suzuki Motors
- Saif Power
- Shifa International Hospitals
- Sui Southern Gas Company

== Annual performance ==
The following table shows the annual performance of the KSE 100 Index based on closing on 31 December each year, which was calculated back to 1990 when the index was launched.

Year	Closing level	Change in Index in Points	Change in Index in %
1991	1,640	–	–
1992	1,244	−396	−24.14
1993	2,164	920	73.95
1994	2,049	−115	−5.31
1995	1,498	−551	−26.89
1996	1,340.88	−157	−10.49
1997	1,753.82	412.94	30.80
1998	945.24	−809	−46.12
1999	1,408.91	463.67	49.05
2000	1,507.59	98.59	6.99
2001	1,273.06	−234.53	−15.56
2002	2,701.42	1,428.36	112.20
2003	4,471.82	1,770.40	65.54
2004	6,218.46	1,746.64	39.06
2005	9,556.61	3,338.15	53.68
2006	10,040.50	483.89	5.06
2007	14,075.83	4,035.33	40.19
2008	5,865.01	−8,210.82	−58.33
2009	9,386.92	3,521.91	60.05
2010	12,022.46	2,635.54	28.08
2011	11,347.66	−674.80	−5.61
2012	16,905.33	5,557.67	48.98
2013	25,261.14	8,355.81	49.43
2014	32,131.28	6,870.14	27.20
2015	32,816.31	685.03	2.13
2016	47,806.97	14,990.66	45.68
2017	40,471.48	−7,335.49	−15.34
2018	37,066.67	−3,404.81	−8.41
2019	40,735.08	3,668.41	9.90
2020	43,755.38	3,020.30	7.41
2021	44,596.07	840.69	1.92
2022	40,420.45	−4,175.62	−9.36
2023	62,451.04	22,030.59	54.50
2024	115,127	52,676	84.35
2025	174,054	58,927	51.18

== See also ==
- KSE-30 Index
- KMI-30 Index
- CDC
