= Pakistan Mercantile Exchange =

Pakistani commodity trader

Coordinates: 24.8447°N 66.9934°E

Pakistan Mercantile Exchange Limited
- Formerly: National Commodity Exchange Limited
- Company type: Unlisted public company
- Industry: Commodity exchange
- Founded: 2005; 21 years ago
- Headquarters: 3B, 3rd Floor, Bahria Complex IV, Ch. Khalique-uz-Zaman Road, Gizri, Karachi, Pakistan
- Products: Futures exchange
- Revenue: ▲ Rs. 676.902 million (US$2.4 million) (2023)
- Operating income: ▲ Rs. 225.521 million (US$810,000) (2023)
- Net income: ▲ Rs. 199.485 million (US$710,000) (2023)
- Total assets: ▲ Rs. 4.770 billion (US$17 million) (2023)
- Total equity: ▲ Rs. 305.866 million (US$1.1 million) (2023)
- Owner: National Bank of Pakistan (33.98%); Pakistan Stock Exchange (28.41%); ISE Towers REIT Management (17.76%); LSE Financial (7.25%); Pak Brunei Investment Company Limited (6.80%)
- Subsidiaries: Global Commodity Trading Platform (Private) Limited
- Website: pmex.com.pk
- Footnotes / references Financials as of 30 June 2023

Pakistan Mercantile Exchange, formerly known as National Commodity Exchange Limited is a futures commodity exchange based in Karachi, Pakistan. It is the only company in Pakistan to provide a centralised and regulated place for commodity futures trading and is regulated by Securities and Exchange Commission of Pakistan (SECP). It began its full trading operations on 11 May 2007.

== History ==
Pakistan Mercantile Exchange was founded as National Commodity Exchange Limited in 2005.

Pakistan Mercantile Exchange Limited started its operations in May 2007 as a fully electronic exchange with nationwide reach.

Pakistan Mercantile Exchange (PMEX) has started offering MetaTrader 5 (MT5) trading platform to all its market participants.

== Trading ==
Pakistan Mercantile Exchange (formerly National Commodity Exchange Limited) initially started trading in Gold only. This listing was followed by the first gold physical delivery in August 2007. Additional Products were subsequently launched – IRRI -6 rice in March 2008 Palm Olien futures in June 2008 and KIBOR futures in Jan 2009. Crude Oil and Silver contracts were listed in Nov 2009. Recently the Sugar contract was also added on 27 June 2011.

The main commodities traded on the Exchange have been Gold, Silver and Crude Oil. There are various contracts in each. Gold has eight contracts namely Gold 1 ounce, Gold 100 ounce, Gold 1 Tola, Gold 50 Tola, Gold 100 tola, Gold Kilo, Gold 100 g, and Minigold 10 g. Tola gold and minigold are deliverable contracts. Furthermore, there are two contracts in Silver – 100 ounce and 500 ounce and two contracts in Crude Oil – 10 barrels and 100 barrels. The smaller lot sizes for Silver and Crude Oil were introduced very recently in June 2011.

The exchange registered trading volume of Rs 306 billion in October 2018.
