= Pharmaceutical industry in Pakistan =

The pharmaceutical industry in Pakistan was estimated to be worth Rs. 748 billion (US$2.7 billion) in 2023, representing about 1% of the country's GDP. The industry is largely import-dependent, with more than 90% of raw material being imported and only 12% of active pharmaceutical ingredients locally produced. Pakistani pharmaceutical companies are engaged in importing raw materials, compounding active pharmaceutical ingredients with excipients, coating of pills, and fill-finish activities. The industry is regulated by the Drug Regulatory Authority of Pakistan, which oversees drug approvals and pricing.

Pakistan imports all specialized finished dosage forms, vaccines and biologicals. A report by the Institute of Chartered Accountants of Pakistan estimated that the Pakistani pharmaceutical industry has a 50-60% import reliance on India. Pakistan exported pharmaceutical products worth about $235 million in 2023, mostly to a few less-regulated markets in Africa and Southeast Asia.

== History ==
At the time of the independence of Pakistan in 1947, there were few production units in the country. Currently Pakistan has more than 800 large volume pharmaceutical formulation units, including those operated by 25 multinationals present in the country. Almost all the raw materials used in making of medicine are sourced from abroad. There are factors hindering growth such as the manufacturing of counterfeit drugs made from substandard active ingredients.

The Pakistan pharmaceutical industry meets around 90% of the country's demand of finished dosage forms and 4% of active ingredients. Specialized finished dosage forms such as soft gelatin capsules, parenteral fat emulsions and metered-dose inhalers continue to be imported. There are only a few bulk drug active ingredient producers and Pakistan mainly depends on imports of bulk drugs for its formulation needs resulting in frequent drug shortages. Political disturbances and allegations of under-invoicing add to the uncertainty of imports and clashes with the customs and tax authorities are common.

In 2017, the World Health Organization accredited the first Pakistani drug formulated by Getz Pharma.

=== Biopharmaceuticals and Manufacturing ===
While traditional small-molecule drug manufacturing has historically dominated the sector, there is a growing focus on biopharmaceuticals and vaccine production in Pakistan. Karachi serves as a major industrial hub for pharmaceutical manufacturing, hosting numerous facilities in areas like the Sindh Industrial Trading Estate (SITE) and Korangi Industrial Area. Recent industry analyses highlight the potential for expanding local biopharmaceutical development, clinical research, and contract manufacturing to reduce reliance on imported active pharmaceutical ingredients (APIs). GSK's F-268 facility in SITE, for instance, is the country's largest pharmaceutical manufacturing site, producing over 200 million packs annually across liquids, penicillin, and tablet production lines.. The Drug Regulatory Authority of Pakistan (DRAP) enforces Good Manufacturing Practices (GMP) to ensure that local production meets international quality and safety standards.

=== Exodus of multinational companies (2000–present) ===
Over the past three decades, the presence of multinational pharmaceutical companies in Pakistan has significantly dwindled, decreasing to 22 from 48. The decline is attributed to the challenging business environment, where supplying quality medicines at rates lower than production costs has become unsustainable.

In April 2008, Merck Sharp & Dohme (Pakistan) Ltd, an American research-based company operating in Pakistan since 1960, divested its business, including its manufacturing unit and locally registered products to a Pakistani local company, Organon Bio Sciences. Similarly, Bristol Myers Squibb, another American company which was operational in Pakistan since 1984 and was manufacturing antibiotics, blood pressure control and cancer drugs in a local factory, transferred its business and product registrations to GlaxoSmithKline Pakistan in 2008.

From the UK, ICI also disinvested, selling its name and production licenses to a local entity, a move mirrored by Roche Pakistan in 2010. Johnson and Johnson, which entered Pakistan in 1966 upon President Ayub Khan's invitation, sold its pharmaceutical and surgical sutures manufacturing unit to a domestic company.

In November 2016, Merck Group divested its operations to a local company, Martin Dow.

In November 2022, Eli Lilly Pakistan, known for producing Humalog medical insulin for diabetes treatment, announced the closure of its operations in Pakistan. In April 2023, Sanofi exited Pakistan and sold its shareholding to the local investors. In July 2023, Bayer completed the sale of its manufacturing unit and local pharmaceutical brands to OBS Group.

In May 2024, Pfizer sold its manufacturing plant in Karachi and pharmaceutical products to Lucky Core Industries.

== List of pharmaceutical companies in Pakistan ==
There are 759 pharmaceutical units operated by around 650 companies.

As of 2023, the 10 largest pharmaceutical companies accounted for 48 percent of the total market, while top 50 companies had a market share of 93 percent.

=== Listed companies ===
- Abbott Pakistan
- AGP Limited
- Citi Pharma
- Ferozsons Laboratories
- GlaxoSmithKline Pakistan
- Haleon Pakistan, formerly known as GSK Consumer Healthcare Pakistan
- Highnoon Laboratories
- Hoechst Pakistan, formerly known as Sanofi-Aventis Pakistan
- The Searle Company
- Otsuka Pakistan

=== Unlisted notable companies ===
- Martin Dow
- Getz Pharma
- CCL Pharmaceuticals
- Hilton Pharma Ltd

== See also ==
- Healthcare in Pakistan
