= Noventra =

Pakistani chemicals manufacturer

- Formerly: Pakistan PTA Limited (2000–2009); Lotte Pakistan PTA Limited (2009–2012); Lotte Chemical Pakistan Limited (2012–2026)
- Type: Public
- Traded as: PSX: LOTCHEM; KSE 100 component
- Industry: Chemical
- Founded: 1998; 28 years ago
- Headquarters: Karachi, Pakistan
- Key people: Adnan Afridi (CEO)
- Revenue: ▼ Rs. 81.619 billion (US$290 million) (2023)
- Operating income: ▼ Rs. 8.480 billion (US$30 million) (2023)
- Net income: ▼ Rs. 5.077 billion (US$18 million) (2023)
- Total assets: ▲ Rs. 43.575 billion (US$160 million) (2023)
- Total equity: ▼ Rs. 22.011 billion (US$79 million) (2023)
- Owner: PTA Global Holding (75.01%)
- Number of employees: 226 (2023)
- Parent: PTA Global Holding
- Website: lottechem.pk
- Footnotes; Financials as of 31 December 2023

Noventra Limited (formerly known as Lotte Chemical Pakistan Limited, Pakistan PTA) is a Pakistani chemicals manufacturer based in Karachi. It is a subsidiary of PTA Global Holding, a joint venture between Montage Commodities FZCO and AsiaPak Investments.

== History ==
Noventra was initially established by ICI Pakistan. The construction of the plant began in 1996 on a 100-acre site in Port Qasim. The plant was commissioned in May 1998 and originally had a production capacity of 400,000 tons per year. It was built at a cost of $479.9 million with $170 million in equity invested by ICI Pakistan while $22.5 million was funded through term finance certificate issued in 1995 and remaining $281.5 million were raised through long-term loans including $171.2 million provided by commercial banks in 1996. In addition to the main plant, ICI constructed a 34-mile water pipeline at a cost of $30 million, supplying 8.5 million gallons of water daily to the plant. ICI also developed a 220-kilovolt industrial power connection and built a grid station, investing $16 million to provide power to its plant.

In 2000, it was demerged from ICI Pakistan to form Pakistan PTA Limited.

In 2008, following AkzoNobel's acquisition of Imperial Chemical Industries, it became part of AkzoNobel. A year later, in 2009, KP Chemical, a subsidiary of Lotte Corporation, acquired Pakistan PTA and renamed it as Lotte Pakistan PTA Limited.

In 2012, Lotte commissioned a co-generation plant with a capacity of 40MW. A year later, in 2013, Lotte Pakistan PTA Limited was renamed as Lotte Chemical Pakistan Limited.

In November 2025, Lotte Chemical Pakistan was acquired by PTA Global Holding Limited. In October 2026, it was renamed to Noventra Limited.
