= Ittehad Chemicals =

Pakistani chemical manufacturing company

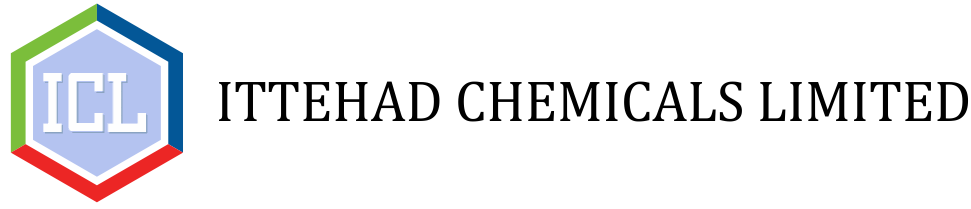
- Formerly: United Chemical Limited
- Company type: Public
- Traded as: PSX: ICL
- Industry: Chemicals
- Founded: 1962; 64 years ago
- Headquarters: Lahore, Pakistan
- Key people: Abdul Sattar Khatri (CEO); Muhammad Siddique Khatri (chairperson)
- Revenue: ▲ Rs. 24.268 billion (US$87 million) (2023)
- Operating income: ▲ Rs. 3.088 billion (US$11 million) (2023)
- Net income: ▲ Rs. 1.826 billion (US$6.5 million) (2023)
- Total assets: ▲ Rs. 14.690 billion (US$53 million) (2023)
- Total equity: ▲ Rs. 6.703 billion (US$24 million) (2023)
- Number of employees: 682 (2023)
- Website: ittehadchemicals.com
- Footnotes / references Financials as of 30 June 2023

Ittehad Chemicals Limited (Urdu: اتحاد کیمیکلز) is a Pakistani chemical company headquartered in Lahore.

== History ==
Ittehad Chemicals was commissioned in 1962 as United Chemicals by Saigol Group and started production with an initial installed capacity of 60 metric ton/day of caustic soda and 54 metric tons/day of chlorine. Rising demand facilitated the first expansion, carried out in 1969, which increased capacity to 90 metric tons/day of caustic soda and 81 metric tons/day of chlorine.

In 1972, Prime Minister Zulfiqar Ali Bhutto began a Nationalisation in Pakistan plan to take over privately-run companies. United Chemicals was nationalized by the Pakistani Government, renamed Ittehad Chemicals, and put under the control of the Federal Chemical and Ceramics Corporation Limited (FPCCL). Another company, Insecticide Pakistan Limited., was nationalized and renamed Ittehad Pesticides Limited in 1973. Later, the two companies were merged to form Ittehad Chemicals Limited. In 1983, the production capacity of Ittehad Chemicals was further increased to 150 metric tons/day of caustic soda and 135 metric tons/day of chlorine. Later, through another expansion, capacity was enhanced to 250 metric tons/day. By the year 2006, overall capacity had reached 380 metric tons/day.

After encountering financial difficulties and turbulence throughout the years of company nationalization, Ittehad Chemicals was ultimately privatized in 1991, and taken over by the Chemi Group of Companies which later on became Ittehad Group.

In 2003, Ittehad Chemicals was listed on the Karachi Stock Exchange following an initial public offering.

Installed capacity of Ittehad Chemicals Limited
Product	Installed capacity (Tonnes)
Caustic soda (liquid)	150,000
Caustic soda (flakes)	10,000
Linear alkylbenzene sulfonic acid (LABSA); Sodium laureth sulfate (SLES)	70,000
Liquid chlorine	13,200
Hydrochloric acid	250,000
Sodium hypochlorite	49,500
Zinc sulphate	600
Sodium sulphate (anhydrous)	4,000
Calcium chloride (prills)	30,000
Humic acid	120

The present product line includes industrial caustic soda sodium hydroxide (solid, liquid and flakes), liquid chlorine, hydrochloric acid, sodium hypochlorite (liquid bleach), zinc sulfate mono, bleaching earth (Shaffaf), sulfuric acid and LABSA.

In the last quarter of 2012, Ittehad Agri Division was launched and now the company is successfully marketing Crystal Zinc, Humic Acid, and Aqua Zinc. Ittehad Chemicals was formally incorporated as a company in 1991.

== Factory ==
Ittehad Chemicals is based in Lahore, Pakistan with its manufacturing plant in nearby Sheikhupura.
