= International Steels Limited =

Pakistani company which manufactures steel products

- Type: Public
- Traded as: PSX: ISL; KSE 100 component
- Industry: Steel
- Founded: 2007; 19 years ago
- Founder: Towfiq H. Chinoy
- Headquarters: Karachi, Sindh
- Area served: Pakistan
- Key people: Yousuf H. Mirza (CEO); Kamal A.Chinoy (chairperson)
- Revenue: ▼ Rs. 76.75 billion (US$270 million) (2023)
- Operating income: ▼ Rs. 7.455 billion (US$27 million) (2023)
- Net income: ▼ Rs. 3.518 billion (US$13 million) (2023)
- Total assets: ▼ Rs. 42.391 billion (US$150 million) (2023)
- Total equity: ▼ Rs. 21.683 billion (US$78 million) (2023)
- Owner: International Industries Limited (56.33%); Sumitomo Corporation (9.07%); JFE Steel (4.74%)
- Number of employees: 688 (2023)
- Parent: International Industries Limited
- Website: isl.com.pk
- Footnotes; Financials as of 30 June 2023

International Steels Limited is a Pakistani company which manufactures cold rolled, galvanized and color coated steel coils and sheets. It is headquartered in Karachi, Pakistan.

== History ==
International Steels was founded by Towfiq H. Chinoy in 2007 as a joint-venture between International Industries Limited, Sumitomo Corporation, and JFE Steel. Its plant was commissioned in 2010 at a cost of $162 million and it had a capacity to produce 280,000 tons per annum of cold rolled coil from hot rolled coil, including 150,000 tons per annum of galvanized steel. The plant is located in the industrial estate of Landhi. The project received $18.40 million loan from the International Finance Corporation which included a convertible loan of $6.4 million.

In June 2011, International Steels was listed on the Karachi Stock Exchange, following an initial public offering at a strike price of PKR 14.06.

In March 2016, International Steel increasing its annual production capacity to over 500,000 metric tons which included 400,000 metric tons of galvanized steel. The project which cost Rs 3.2 billion involved upgrading the cold rolling mill (CCM), adding a second galvanizing line, and establishing a colour coating steel plant.

In June 2018, International Steel commissioned a new plant which further increased its production capacity to 1 million tons per annum.
