= Engro Fertilizers =

Fertilizer company in Pakistan

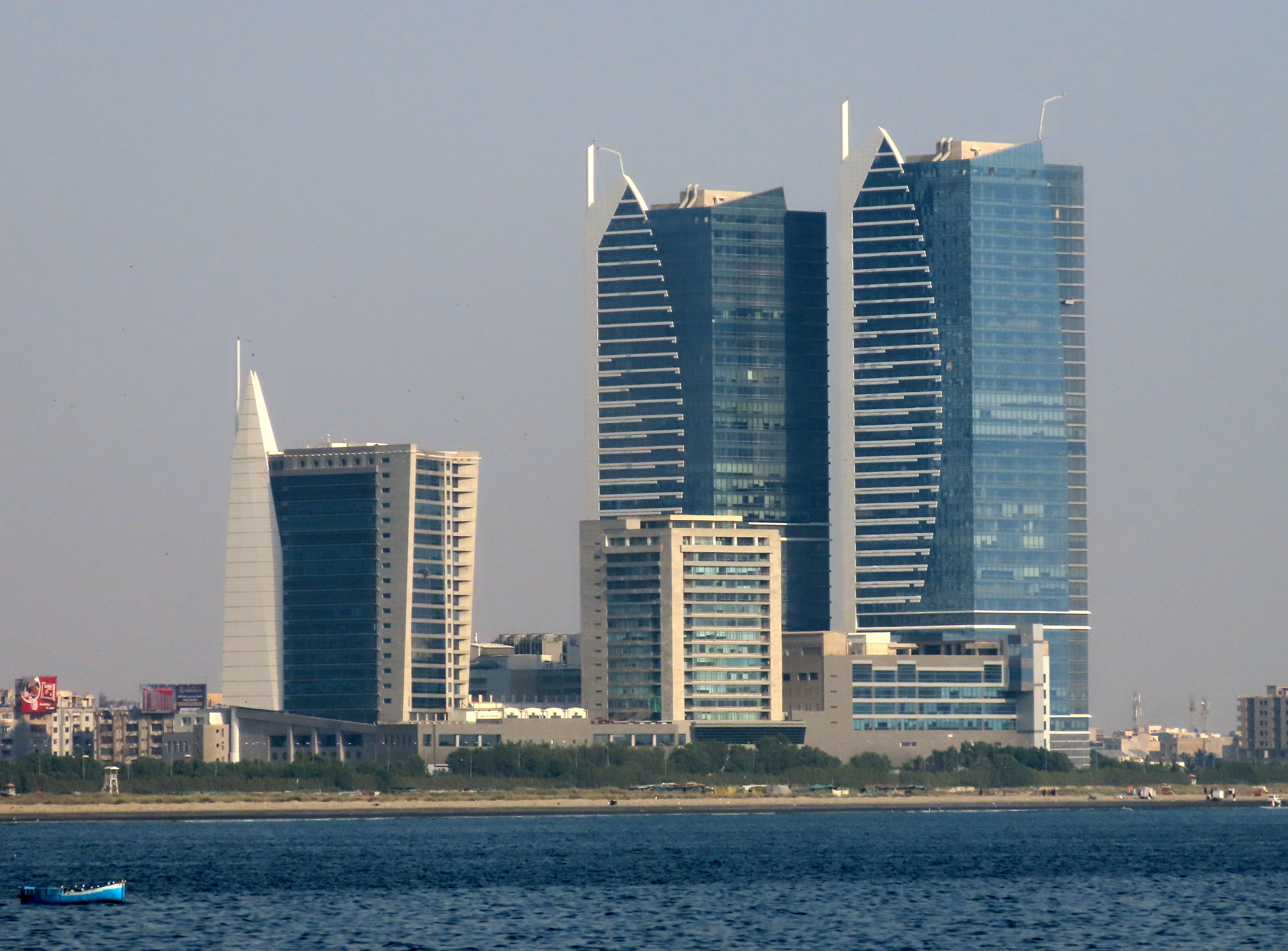
- Engro Fertilizers' headquarters, located in the Harbour Front Building (left tower) of Dolmen City.
- Type: Public
- Traded as: PSX: EFERT; KSE 100 component KSE 30 component
- Industry: Fertilizer
- Founded: 2010; 16 years ago
- Headquarters: Karachi-75600, Pakistan
- Key people: Imran Ahmed (CEO)
- Products: Zarkhez, Zingro, Zorawar, Zoron
- Revenue: ▲ Rs. 186.71 billion (US$670 million) (2024)
- Operating income: ▼ Rs. 40.94 billion (US$150 million) (2024)
- Net income: ▲ Rs. 30.21 billion (US$110 million) (2024)
- Total assets: ▲ Rs. 162.92 billion (US$580 million) (2024)
- Total equity: ▲ Rs. 46.53 billion (US$170 million) (2024)
- Owner: Engro Corporation (56.27%); IFC (11.9%); Others (Free Float)
- Number of employees: 3,031 (2024)
- Website: engrofertilizers.com
- Footnotes; Financials as of 31 December 2024

Engro Fertilizers (Urdu pronunciation: [ɛn.ˈɡɾoː ˈfɝː.tɪ.laɪ.zɚrz] en-GROW-FER-ti-LY-zurz) is a Pakistani fertiliser manufacturing company headquartered in Karachi with its manufacturing facility located at Daharki, and a facility located at Port Qasim as well. It is a subsidiary of Engro Corporation. It has a 35% market share of the Pakistani fertilizer market as of 2023.

== History ==
Engro Fertilizers was demerged from the parent company Engro Corporation in 2010.

In June 2011, Engro commissioned the EnVen plant at a cost of $1.1 billion. It was built under the 2001 Fertilizer Policy of Pakistan in which the Government of Pakistan guaranteed gas supply at a reduced rate for ten years. The contract was signed with Sui Northern Gas Pipelines Limited, which defaulted on their contract and in 2013 Engro claimed Rs. 34 billion in damages.

In December 2013, Engro was listed on the Karachi Stock Exchange, following an initial public offering at a strike price of Rs. 28.25.

In February 2015, Engro Fertilizers acquired Engro Eximp Private Limited from Engro Corporation. Engro Eximp imports diammonium phosphate (DAP) fertilizer in Pakistan.

In June 2016, Engro Corporation sold 28 percent of its stake in Engro Fertilizers to private investors for $185 million.

== Production ==
=== Pakven 600 ===
Pakven 600 was commissioned in September 1993, which increased Engro's urea production capacity from 268,000 tons to 600,000 tons per annum. It was an imported second-hand plant which was installed at a cost of $130 million. In July 1995, Engro further increased its capacity by 150,000 tons per annum at a cost of $23 million.

The plant has outlived its useful life. In 2021, Engro increased its capacity from 500,000 tons to 780,000 tons per annum and a year later further expanded it to 950,000 tons per annum.

=== EnVen ===
The EnVen plant is located in Daharki. The construction of the plant began in 2007. It was commissioned in 2011 at a cost of $1.1 billion. It was built under the provisions of the 2001 fertilizer policy in which the Government of Pakistan gave a guarantee of subsidized gas for a period of ten years. The plant has a designed annual production capacity of 1.3 million tons of urea fertilizer.

=== NPK Plant ===
Zarkhez NPK plant is located at Port Bin Qasim, Karachi. It was commissioned in 2000 and had an annual production capacity of 100,000 metric tons. The plant has since been debottlenecked and production capacity increased to 145,000 metric tons.
