= KSE 30 Index =

Pakistani stock market index

KSE-30 Index شاخص کے ایس ای ۳۰
- Foundation: September 1, 2006; 20 years ago
- Operator: Pakistan Stock Exchange (PSX)
- Trading symbol: KSE30
- Constituents: 30
- Type: Large cap
- Weighting method: free float methodology
- Website: www.psx.com.pk

The KSE-30 Index is a stock market index which tracks the performance of the top 30 most liquid companies listed on the stock exchanges in Pakistan. The index is based on a free float methodology in differentiation to other indices based on paid-up capital.

The KSE-30 Index was launched and implemented by the Karachi Stock Exchange in 2006. In 2016, the Karachi Stock Exchange was merged with the Lahore Stock Exchange and Islamabad Stock Exchange to the Pakistan Stock Exchange (PSX). In 2016, the PSX announced a change in the KSE-30 index, stating that it would only cover the top thirty companies. The index is re-composed twice a year.

== Components ==
Ticker	Logo	Company	PSX sector	Index weighting (%)^{1}
PSX: AIRLINK	—	Air Link Communication	Technology & Communication	0.47
PSX: ATRL		Attock Refinery Limited	Refinery	1.18
PSX: BOP		The Bank of Punjab	Commercial Banks	1.42
PSX: DGKC	—	D.G. Khan Cement	Cement	1.17
PSX: EFERT		Engro Fertilizers	Fertilizer	3.62
PSX: ENGROH		Engro Holdings	Investment Banks / Investment Companies / Securities Companies	8.00
PSX: FCCL		Fauji Cement	Cement	1.23
PSX: FFC		Fauji Fertilizer Company	Fertilizer	12.06
PSX: GAL		Ghandhara Automobiles Limited	Automobile Assembler	0.29
PSX: GHNI		Ghandhara Industries	Automobile Assembler	0.35
PSX: HBL		Habib Bank Limited	Commercial Banks	4.99
PSX: HUBC		Hub Power Company	Power Generation & Distribution	6.45
PSX: LUCK		Lucky Cement	Cement	5.47
PSX: MARI		Mari Energies	Oil & Gas Exploration Companies	4.58
PSX: MCB		MCB Bank Limited	Commercial Banks	4.95
PSX: MEBL		Meezan Bank	Commercial Banks	6.74
PSX: MLCF	—	Maple Leaf Cement	Cement	1.13
PSX: NBP		National Bank of Pakistan	Commercial Banks	2.73
PSX: NRL	–	National Refinery Limited	Refinery	0.29
PSX: OGDC		Oil and Gas Development Company	Oil & Gas Exploration Companies	5.92
PSX: PAEL		Pak Elektron	Cable & Electrical Goods	0.58
PSX: POL	—	Pakistan Oilfields Limited	Oil & Gas Exploration Companies	2.61
PSX: PPL	—	Pakistan Petroleum	Oil & Gas Exploration Companies	4.18
PSX: PSO		Pakistan State Oil	Oil & Gas Marketing Companies	2.54
PSX: SAZEW		Sazgar	Automobile Assembler	1.25
PSX: SEARL		The Searle Company	Pharmaceuticals	0.77
PSX: SNGP	—	Sui Northern Gas Pipelines	Oil & Gas Marketing Companies	0.74
PSX: SSGC	—	Sui Southern Gas Company	Oil & Gas Marketing Companies	0.25
PSX: SYS		Systems Limited	Technology & Communication	3.90
PSX: UBL		United Bank Limited	Commercial Banks	10.15

== See also ==
- KSE 100 Index
- KMI 30 Index
