= Avanceon =

Publicly listed technology company in Pakistan

Avanceon Limited
- Formerly: Innovative Automation and Engineering Limited (1989–2007)
- Type: Public
- Traded as: PSX: AVN; KSE 100 component
- ISIN: PK0107501014
- Industry: Information technology
- Founded: 1989; 37 years ago
- Founder: Bakhtiar Hameed Wain
- Headquarters: The Avanceon Building, Main Multan Road, Lahore
- Area served: Pakistan, Qatar, United Arab Emirates
- Key people: Bakhtiar Hameed Wain (CEO); Khalid Hameed Wain (Chairman)
- Revenue: ▼ Rs. 16.156 billion (US$58 million) (2024)
- Operating income: ▼ Rs. 1.762 billion (US$6.3 million) (2024)
- Net income: ▼ Rs. 2.008 billion (US$7.2 million) (2024)
- Total assets: ▲ Rs. 28.162 billion (US$100 million) (2024)
- Total equity: ▲ Rs. 13.974 billion (US$50 million) (2024)
- Number of employees: 246 (2022)
- Subsidiaries: Avanceon FZE Dubai; Avanceon Automation & Control W.L.L Qatar; Octopus Digital
- Website: avanceon.ae
- Footnotes; Financials as of 31 December 2024

Avanceon Limited is a Pakistani industrial automation, process control, and system integration company headquartered in Lahore. Its subsidiaries include Avanceon FZE Dubai, Avanceon Automation & Control W.L.L Qatar, Octopus Digital, and Avanceon Saudi for Energy Co. WLL.

== History ==
=== 1989–2003: Early history ===
Avanceon's origins trace back to 1984, when Bakhtiar Hameed Wain, an engineer who previously worked at Exxon Chemicals, Fauji Fertilizer, and ICI, founded an industrial automation firm in Exton, Pennsylvania. In 1989, Wain established the Pakistan operation as Innovative Automation and Engineering Ltd (IAEL), initially focused on programming programmable logic controller (PLC) systems and providing automation support for food and beverage companies.

=== 2003–2012: Under Engro ownership ===
Avanceon Limited was incorporated as a private limited company in Pakistan on 26 March 2003. In the same year, Engro Corporation acquired a majority stake in IAEL.

In 2007, Engro Innovative Inc., the U.S. investment arm of Engro, acquired the Pennsylvania-based Advanced Automation Associates (AAA). Engro Corporation then unified its automation holdings, IAEL in Pakistan, Engro Innovative Automation Ltd (EIAL), and Advanced Automation in the United States, into a single company named Avanceon, derived from the French word avance and the English word eon, meaning "progressing, forever". Avanceon was converted to a public company in 2008.

In 2012, Engro divested its shareholding in Avanceon back to the founding management.

=== 2012–present: IPO and growth ===
In 2014, Avanceon completed its initial public offering on the Karachi Stock Exchange (now the Pakistan Stock Exchange) at a strike price of PKR 14 per share.

In 2017, Avanceon incorporated Octopus Digital as a subsidiary to handle its After Market Support (AMS) services on a recurring revenue basis. In the same year, it also established Avanceon Automation & Control LLC in Qatar. In 2020, Avanceon founded Avanceon QFZ LLC in the Qatar Free Zones Authority.

In October 2022, Avanceon acquired Dawood Hercules Corporation's artificial intelligence subsidiary EmpiricAI in exchange for a 5.68% stake in Octopus Digital.

In January 2023, VINCI Energies, a subsidiary of French infrastructure conglomerate VINCI, acquired Avanceon's United States operation, Avanceon LLC, based in Exton, Pennsylvania. Avanceon FZE withdrew its 25.056% partnership interest in Avanceon LP in Pennsylvania in exchange for a payment of US$1.5 million, retaining the rights to the Avanceon trademark in all territories outside the United States, Canada, and Mexico. The US entity was integrated into VINCI Energies' Actemium network.

In April 2023, Avanceon Saudi for Energy Company, a wholly owned subsidiary of Avanceon FZE Dubai based in Riyadh, formed a joint venture with ZOMCO (Zamil Operations & Maintenance Co.), a subsidiary of the Saudi Zamil Group, and established Avanceon Arabia InfoTech WLL.

== Subsidiaries ==
- Octopus Digital
