= Hub Power Company =

Electric power company in Pakistan

The Hub Power Company Ltd

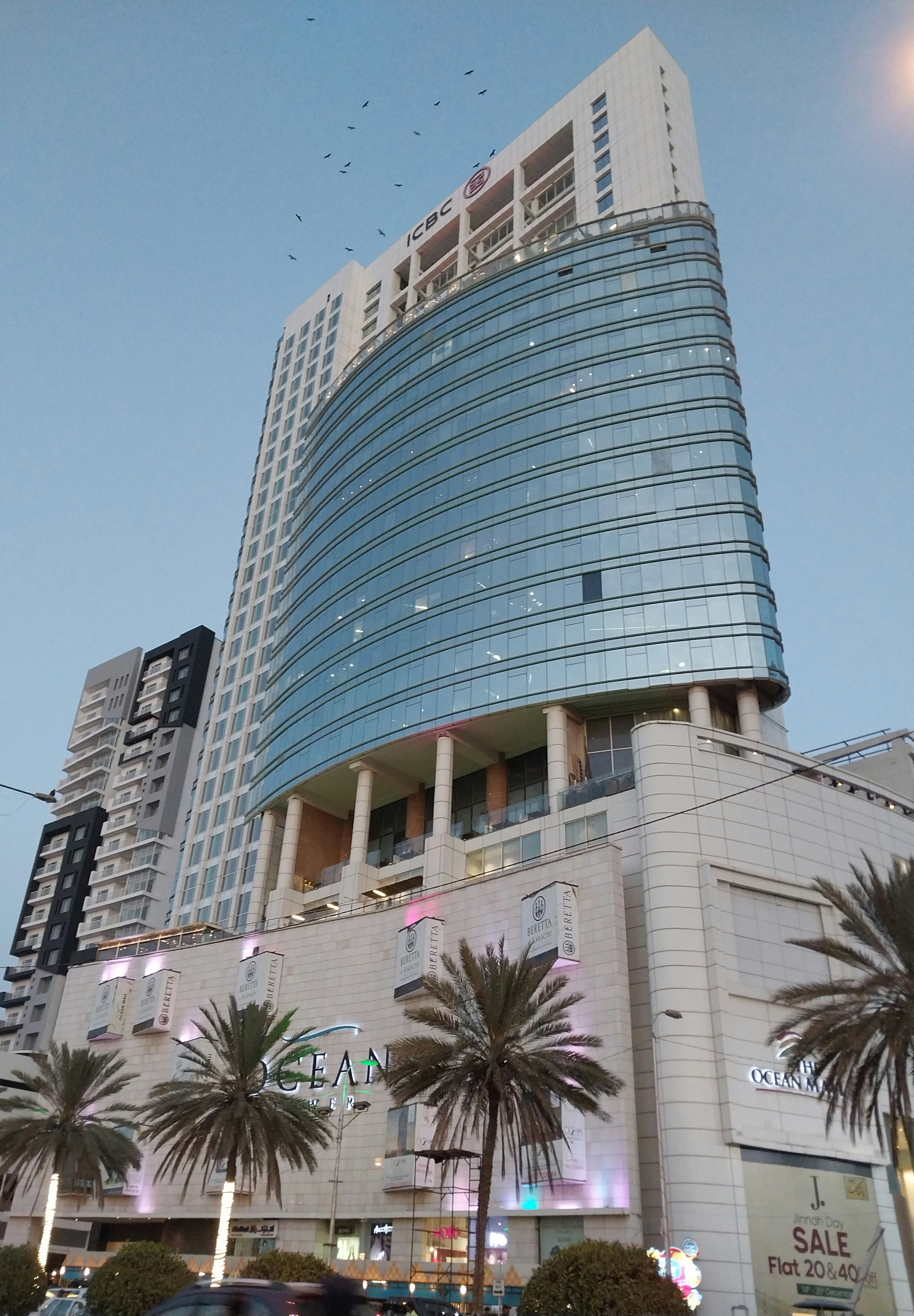
- HUBCO's headquarters at Ocean Towers, Karachi
- Native name: شرکت حب پاور محدود
- Type: Public
- Traded as: PSX: HUBC; KSE 100 component KSE 30 component
- Industry: Electricity generation
- Founded: 1991; 35 years ago
- Headquarters: Karachi, Pakistan
- Area served: Pakistan
- Key people: Kamran Kamal (CEO); Habibullah Khan (Chairman)
- Net income: ▲ Rs. 70.018 billion (US$250 million) (2024)
- Total equity: ▲ Rs. 190.368 billion (US$680 million) (2024)
- Owner: Mega Conglomerate (19.50%)
- Number of employees: 801 (2024)
- Subsidiaries: Hub Power Services Limited; Narowal Energy Limited; Laraib Energy Limited (74.95%); Thar Energy Limited (60%); Prime International Oil & Gas Company Limited (50%); China Power Hub Operating Company Limited (49%); China Power Hub Generation Company Limited (47.5%); ThalNova Power (38.3%); Mega Motor Company (50%)
- Website: hubpower.com
- Footnotes; Financials as of 30 June 2024

The Hub Power Company Limited, colloquially known as HUBCO, is a Pakistani power company based in Karachi, Sindh. It was the first independent power producer (IPP) established in Pakistan, and before the termination of its energy agreement in October 2024, it was the largest IPP in the country. HUBCO is listed on the Pakistan Stock Exchange.

== History ==
=== 1991–1998: Early years ===
Hub Power Company (Hubco) was founded in 1991. The project was funded by $770 million in loan agreements and $325 million in equity from international investors. The major investors included National Power with 20.4 percent shareholding, Xenel with 14.5 percent, and Entergy with a 10 percent holding.

Hubco also raised $175 million through the issuance of global depository receipts (GDRs) on the Luxembourg Stock Exchange, which peaked at $13.25 upon introduction to the market on 5 October, with each GDR consisting of 25 shares. Local investors were allocated approximately 69 million shares valued at $30 million following an initial public offering on the Karachi Stock Exchange at PKR 13.60.

Of the $770 million loan, Hubco secured a $686 million, 12-year credit facility organized by Citibank and other major banks on 30 September 1994, which included a $36.9 million concessional loan from the Commonwealth Development Corporation and $465 million from loans facilitated by the World Bank-funded public-sector energy development fund, including $166 million in standby funds at an interest rate of 2 percent plus Libor. The company also obtained a local currency loan of Rs 3,012 million ($98.4 million) on 2 October in Karachi, arranged by the National Development Finance Corporation and involving several Pakistani banks.

By 1998, Hubco became the second largest listed company on the Karachi Stock Exchange by market capitalization. Initially, the revenue of the company was denominated in United States dollars. In October 1998, the Nawaz Sharif administration canceled parts of energy purchase agreement with Hubco due to corruption and high energy tariff.

=== 1998–2018: Lawsuits, renegotiation of contracts, and decline ===
In 2000, Hubco and its investors, including Entergy and National Power, agreed to forgive $200 million of the $274 million debt owed by the Water and Power Development Authority to Hubco. Hubco also reduced its tariffs and operation and maintenance contracts in 2002, reducing internal rate of return from 17 percent to 12 percent. These adjustments were made to manage the remaining $74 million required for loan repayments. Previously, Entergy had filed a lawsuit against WAPDA in the International Court of Arbitration which was withdrawn following a settlement. The lawsuit sought approximately $8 billion in damages over the 30-year life of the independent power project. The claim was filed in response to WAPDA's withdrawal from the power purchase agreement, which was based on allegations of corruption involving former Hubco's business executives.

In 2008, Hubco acquired a 75 percent stake in Laraib Energy and initiated an 84 MW run-of-river hydroelectric power project downstream on the Mangla Dam. In 2013, Laraib Energy's New Bong Hydropower Plant commenced commercial operation.

In 2011, Xenel exited Pakistan and sold its stake of 140 million shares (12.3 per cent) at a price of Rs37 per share. A year later, National Power UK divested its 17.44 percent shareholding to Dawood Hercules and Allied Bank Limited at PKR 31 per share.

In 2013, Hubco incorporated its oil-fired Narowal Power Plant as its wholly owned subsidiary.

In 2017, Hubco delisted its GDR from the Luxembourg Stock Exchange due to low trading volumes.

In 2018, Dawood Hercules divested its 15.7 percent shareholding to Mega Conglomerate at PKR 105.12 per share.

=== 2018–present: Diversification and termination of contract ===
In 2019, the China Power Hub Generation Company (CPHGC) commissioned a 1.32 GW coal-fired thermal power plant. The $2 billion facility is now fully operational and is owned by CPHGC, a joint venture between Hubco and China Power International. Hubco holds a 74 percent stake in the venture, while China Power International owns the remaining 26 percent.

In 2022, Prime International, a joint venture of Hubco, acquired the Italian energy multinational Eni's E&P subsidiary Eni Pakistan.

In October 2024, Hubco prematurely terminated its energy purchase agreement for the power station based in Hub with the government of Pakistan amid concerns about coercion and threats of corruption cases against IPP owners if they sought international arbitration.

== Group ==
=== Subsidiaries ===
- Narowal Energy Limited (NEL): Wholly owned by HUBCO. It manages and operates the Narowal Power Plant
- Hub Power Services Limited (HPSL): Wholly owned subsidiary of HUBCO
- Hub Power Holdings (HPHL): Incorporated to invest in future growth projects. It has a 50 percent stake in Mega Motor Company that secured a master supply and manufacture agreement to manufacture, market, distribute and sell the BYD brand passengers vehicles in Pakistan.
- Thar Energy Limited (TEL): HUBCO has 60% shareholding in TEL which is setting up a 330-megawatt (MW) Thar Lignite Coal-based mine mouth Power Plant and is a part of the China-Pakistan Economic Corridor (CPEC)
- Laraib Energy Limited (LEL): HUBCO owns 74.95% of LEL which is the owner and developer of the New Bong Escape Power Project

=== Associates ===
- China Power Hub Generation Company (CPHGC) is the project company for the development, construction and operation of 2×660 MW coal-fired power plant in Hub, Balochistan, near the Hub plant. HUBCO has 46% stake in CPHGC
- Sindh Engro Coal Mining Company Limited (SECMC) is an open-pit mining company in which HUBCO has 8% stake
- ThalNova Power Thar (Pvt.) Ltd. is a 330 MW mine-mouth lignite-fired power plant in which HUBCO has acquired majority shares

=== Operational plants ===
- Hub Plant (1,292 MW) is located 60 km from Karachi in Hub. The electricity at Hub is generated by four 323-megawatt oil-fired units that are supplied by a 78 km-long pipeline from Pakistan State Oil. It consists of four generating units, each unit has capacity of 323 MW gross output, with an oil-fired single re-heat boiler and tandem compound and two cylinder condensing steam turbines directly coupled to a hydrogen-cooled generator.
- Narowal Power Plant (225 MW) located in Narowal, Punjab, consists of 11 generating sets, 11 Alborg heat recovery steam generators and one air-cooled condensing steam turbine from Dresser Rand.
- New Bong Escape Power Project (84 MW), located in Mirpur, Azad Jammu& Kashmir, commenced commercial operations on 23 March 2013 and has the distinction of being Pakistan and AJ&K's first hydropower IPP. The Project uses the water discharged from an upstream already existing hydropower plant located at Mangla Dam.
- China Power Hub Generation Company (CPHGC) Power Plant(1320 MW) is an imported coal-based plant supplying energy to the national grid and located at Hub. The CPHGC plant consists of two generating units each rated at 660 MW Gross, with each unit having GE supercritical boilers, steam turbine and generator sets.
- Thar Energy Limited (TEL) Project is a lignite-based 330 MW project. The project achieved commercial operations on 10 October 2022.
- ThalNova Power Thar is also a 330 MW mine-mouth lignite-fired power plant similar to TEL. Commercial operations of the project commenced in February 2023.

=== Other projects ===
- Sindh Engro Company Limited (SECMC) has developed a coal mine at Thar which has the seventh largest reserves of coal in the World. SECMC achieved Commercial Operations for Phase I in July, 2019 and will be embarking to double its coal mining capacity to supply fuel to HUBCO's Thar Energy Limited and ThalNova projects which are under construction.
- Prime International Oil & Gas Company a newly established joint venture (JV) between Eni Pakistan local employees and Hub Power Company acquired Eni's assets in Pakistan. These assets include interests in eight development and production leases and four exploration licences.

== See also ==
- List of power stations in Pakistan
- HUBCO Green
