= PEL (company) =

Pakistani home appliances manufacturer

Pak Elektron Limited
- Type: Public
- Traded as: PSX: PAEL; KSE 100 component
- Industry: Major appliances; Electrical equipment
- Founded: 1956
- Headquarters: Lahore, Punjab, Pakistan
- Area served: Pakistan
- Key people: Naseem Saigol (Chairman); Murad Saigol (CEO)
- Products: Refrigerators; Air conditioners Deep freezers Microwave ovens Water dispensers Washing machines LED televisions Transformers; Switchgear; Energy meters
- Revenue: ▲ Rs. 66.02 billion (US$240 million) (2022)
- Operating income: ▲ Rs. 5.43 billion (US$19 million) (2022)
- Net income: ▼ Rs. 1.06 billion (US$3.8 million) (2022)
- Total assets: ▲ Rs. 67.41 billion (US$240 million) (2022)
- Total equity: ▲ Rs. 38.95 billion (US$140 million) (2022)
- Owner: Saigol family
- Website: pel.com.pk

Pak Elektron Limited (PEL) is a Pakistani major appliances and electrical equipment manufacturer headquartered in Lahore.

PEL operates in two segments: power and appliances. The former includes manufacturing of power transformers and energy meters, while the latter division assembles and distributes home appliances such as refrigerators and air conditioners.

== History ==
Pak Elektron Limited was incorporated on 3 March 1956 as a public limited company under the Companies Act 1913 by the Malik Brothers, in technical collaboration with AEG of Germany, to manufacture transformers, switchgear and electric motors. In October 1978, after AEG relinquished its shareholding, the company was acquired by the Saigol family of Companies and subsequently floated its shares on the Karachi Stock Exchange and the Lahore Stock Exchange.

Under Saigol ownership, PEL established its appliances division in 1980 and began producing window-type air conditioners in 1981 in technical collaboration with General Corporation of Japan. Production of refrigerators and deep freezers followed in 1986–87 through collaborations with IAR-SILTAL and Ariston Thermo of Italy. In 1995, PEL entered the television market through a joint venture with Daewoo Electronics of South Korea.

In 2005, PEL established a power transformer manufacturing facility with technical assistance from Ganz Works of Hungary. In 2009, the company became the sole distributor of LG Corporation's home appliances in Pakistan.

In February 2018, the World Bank imposed a 33-month debarment on PEL, its affiliates PEL Marketing, Kohinoor Power Company, and its former general manager, Abdul Waheed Butt, for engaging in collusive practices during bidding on World Bank-financed electricity distribution and transmission improvement projects in Pakistan. As part of Negotiated Resolution Agreements, PEL and Butt acknowledged their roles in the misconduct and agreed to comply with specified corporate compliance conditions for release from debarment. An investigation by the World Bank's Integrity Vice Presidency found that PEL was part of a trade association that conspired to allocate predetermined shares of five contracts by deciding winners in advance and coordinating bid prices; Butt chaired meetings that distributed at least two of these contracts among group members.

In 2020, PEL became a distributor of Panasonic products in Pakistan. In 2025, PEL commenced export operations to the United States.

== Power equipment ==
PEL's Power Division consists of three main products:

- Energy meters
- Transformers
- Switchgears
