= Jubilee Insurance (Pakistan) =

Pakistani general and life insurance company

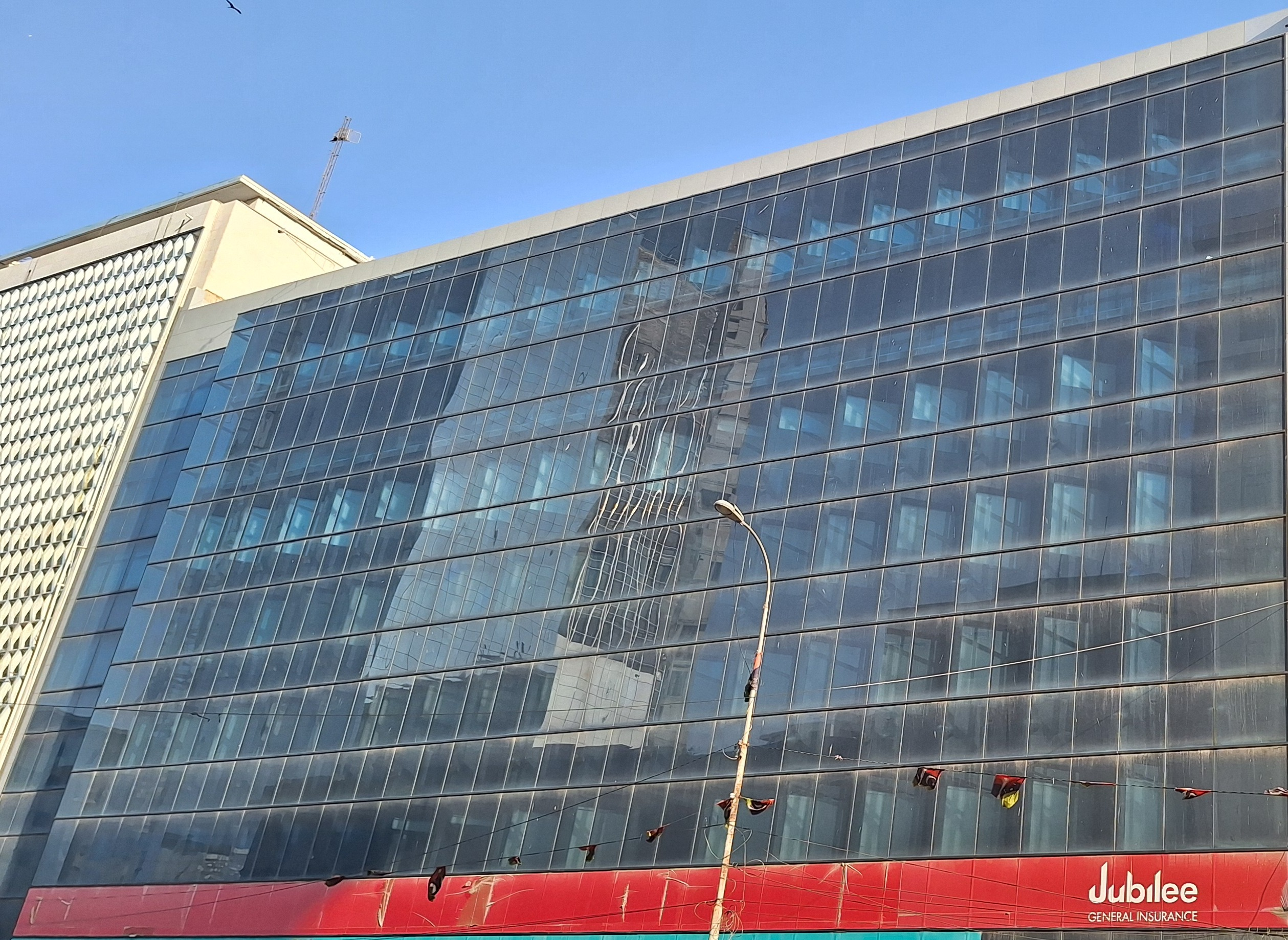
- Headquarters of Jubilee Insurance on I.I. Chundrigar Road in Karachi
- Type: Public
- Traded as: PSX: JGICL; PSX: JLICL
- Industry: Insurance
- Founded: 1953; 73 years ago
- Headquarters: Karachi, Pakistan
- Number of locations: 224 (2022)
- Website: jubileegeneral.com.pk jubileelife.com

Jubilee Insurance is a brand used by Pakistani general and life insurance companies headquartered in Karachi. The two companies are subsidiaries of Swiss for-profit organization Aga Khan Fund for Economic Development. As of 2024, Jubilee Life was the largest private-sector insurance company in Pakistan. It is also the most awarded insurance company in Pakistan.

== History ==
Jubilee Insurance was incorporated as New Jubilee Insurance Company Limited by the Fancy family in May 1953. In 1955, it was listed on the Karachi Stock Exchange. The life insurance business was nationalised in 1972 and later Fancy family sold it to the Hashwani family.

In 2002, the Aga Khan Fund for Economic Development acquired the Pakistani operations of CGU International Insurance plc. CGU International Insurance founded life insurance business in Pakistan in 1995.

In 2011, New Jubilee Insurance was renamed as Jubilee Insurance.

In 2015, Jubilee entered the Takaful insurance market in Pakistan.

On July 29, 2020, Jubilee was awarded the Effie Award in the insurance category.

== See also ==
- EFU Group
