= Hascol Petroleum =

Pakistani oil marketing company

- Type: Public
- Traded as: PSX: HASCOL
- Industry: Petroleum
- Founded: 2001; 25 years ago
- Founder: Mumtaz Hassan Khan
- Headquarters: Karachi, Pakistan,
- Key people: Sir Alan Duncan (Chairman); Javed Yousuf Ahmedjee (CEO)
- Products: Gasoline, diesel, fuel oil, Jet A-1, LPG, lubricants
- Revenue: ▲ Rs. 143.858 billion (US$510 million) (2024)
- Operating income: ▲ Rs. -12.058 billion (US$−43 million) (2024)
- Net income: ▲ Rs. -12.660 billion (US$−45 million) (2024)
- Owner: Vitol (40.21%)
- Number of employees: 263 (2024)
- Website: hascol.com

Hascol Petroleum Limited is a Pakistani oil marketing company based in Karachi. It is majority-owned by Vitol and holds the distribution rights of German lubricating oil Fuchs in Pakistan.

== History ==
=== 2001–2019: Early history ===
Hascol Petroleum was founded in 2001 by Mumtaz Hasan Khan. Khan had earlier founded Hascombe Limited in London in 1980, a crude oil and refined products trading company that supplied petroleum products to Pakistan during the 1990s, including arranging all eight gasoline shipments to the country in February 1992 following the disruption caused by the Invasion of Kuwait.

In 2005, Hascol received oil marketing license from the government.

In 2014, Hascol was listed on the Karachi Stock Exchange.

In February 2016, Vitol Dubai Limited, part of Vitol, acquired 15 percent of Hascol's share capital for approximately US$28 million, with an option to buy an additional 10 percent. In June 2017, Vitol increased its stake to 25 percent for an additional US$18.7 million. In the same period, Hascol secured license to manufacture and distribute Fuchs lubricants in Pakistan. In February 2017, Hascol laid the foundation stone of a US$20 million lube oil blending plant at Port Qasim. In March 2017, Hascol incorporated VAS LNG as a joint venture with Vitol, and set up Hascol Terminals Limited as another joint venture with Vitol-VTTI to build a 200,000-tonne oil terminal at Port Qasim, which was commissioned in 2019.

In October 2018, Hascol acquired a LPG plant from Marshal Gas for Rs175 million, with the approval of the Oil and Gas Regulatory Authority (OGRA). In the same year, Hascol entered into a joint operations agreement with Total Parco Pakistan Limited.

=== 2019–present: Financial crisis and restructuring ===
In 2019, Hascol financial position deteriorated and the company reported a net loss of Rs26 billion for the year ended December 31, 2019, which it attributed to large foreign-exchange losses, falling fuel oil demand, and high inventory costs.

In July 2021, the Federal Investigation Agency opened a criminal probe into Rs 54.5 billion of bank borrowings and issued notices to nine lenders over suspected fabrication of trade finance documents. The FIA also alleged that NBP had opened fake letters of credit worth approximately Rs95 billion in favour of Byco Petroleum for which no underlying fuel existed and that approximately US$42 million had been transferred outside Pakistan through over-invoicing. Later, a scandal surfaced that Hascol had falsified its books and financial statements in 2019, this, coupled with mounting losses resulted in the company's share price tumbling from over Rs. 300 in 2018 to about Rs. 5 in 2021, and the Pakistan Stock Exchange declaring the company to be in default. The company had its assets frozen by the High Court of Sindh upon request of the company's creditors.

In June 2023, Taj Gasoline announced an intention to acquire at least 41 percent of Hascol's share capital by subscribing to new shares; the offer was withdrawn in January 2024. In December 2023, Dubai-based Millat Energy Group, through its investment holding company Millat Global Holdings, expressed interest in acquiring 76 percent of Hascol's fully diluted share capital.

In January 2026, the High Court of Sindh acquitted former National Bank of Pakistan president Iqbal Ahmed Ashraf in the Rs54 billion loan-scam case, with the court noting that nearly all other accused parties had been exonerated, acquitted, or converted into witnesses.

== Operations ==
Hascol sells petroleum products, chemicals, LPG, and lubricants through more its than 400 service stations. Its product range includes gasoline, high-speed diesel, fuel oil, Jet A-1, LPG, and FUCHS lubricants.

Its joint venture subsidiary, Hascol Terminals Limited, operates bulk import facilities at Keamari and the 200,000-tonne Port Qasim oil terminal. Hascol also owns and operates storage depots at Mehmoodkot, Daulatpur, Machike, Shikarpur, and Sahiwal, and has pipeline access to northern areas. Hascol also operates a chain of convenience stores on its forecourts under the Hasmart brand, AutoMax LPG stations, and the Hascol fuel card service.

== See also ==
- Pakistan State Oil
