= Sazgar =

Pakistani automotive manufacturer

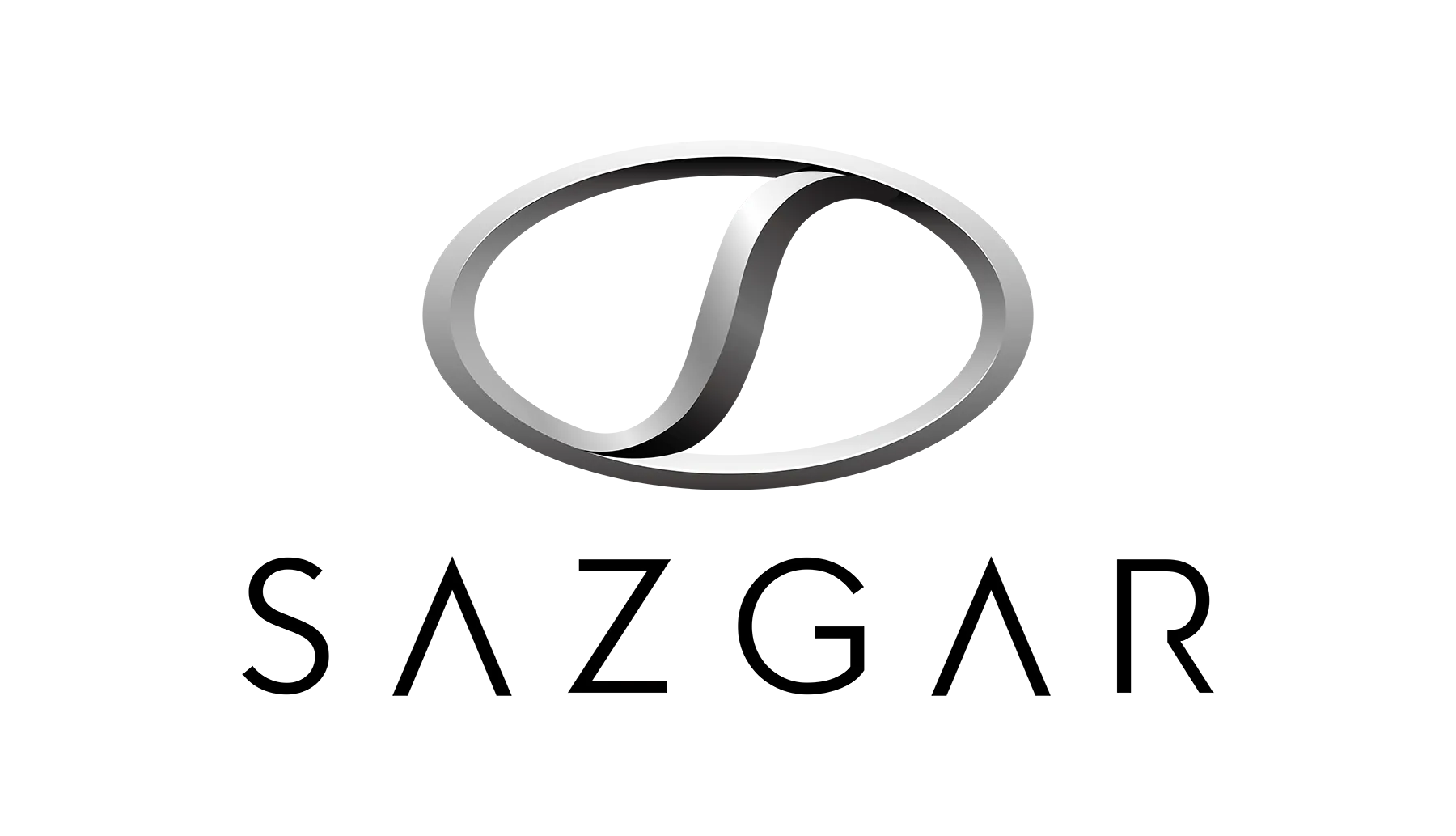
- Native name: سازگار
- Type: Public
- Traded as: PSX: SAZEW; KSE 100 component KSE 30 component
- Industry: Automotive
- Founded: 1991
- Founder: Mian Asad Hameed
- Headquarters: Lahore, Pakistan
- Area served: Pakistan
- Key people: Saira Asad Hameed (Chairman); Mian Asad Hameed (CEO)
- Products: Automobiles, engines
- Revenue: ▲ Rs. 108.694 billion (US$390 million) (2025)
- Operating income: ▲ Rs. 26.739 billion (US$96 million) (2025)
- Net income: ▲ Rs. 16.336 billion (US$58 million) (2025)
- Total assets: ▲ Rs. 41.736 billion (US$150 million) (2025)
- Total equity: ▲ Rs. 23.707 billion (US$85 million) (2025)
- Owner: Mian Asad Hameed (41.85%); Mian Muhammad Ali Hameed (11.61%); Saira Asad Hameed (6.41%)
- Number of employees: 1,552 (2025)
- Website: sazgarautos.com
- Footnotes; Financials as of 30 June 2025

Sazgar Engineering Works Limited (Urdu pronunciation: [sɑːz.ˈɡɑːr] sahz-GAHR) is a Pakistani automotive assembler headquartered in Lahore. It specialises in the assembly of cars and rickshaws.

== History ==
Sazgar Engineering Works was founded in September 1991 as a private limited company. It was converted into a public limited company in November 1994. In 1996, it was listed on the Karachi Stock Exchange.

In 2022, Haval H6 HEV vehicle was launched. It is assembled under a joint venture of Sazgar Engineering Works Ltd and Great Wall Motor of China.

Sazgar has been producing motorised rickshaws since 2005. In February 2024, it became the first company in Pakistan to obtain a licence to produce electric three-wheelers. As of February 2026, Sazgar holds approximately a 30% share of the Pakistani rickshaw market, producing 3350 units monthly, including around 30 electric models.

In October 2026, Sazgar inaugurated its first overseas vehicle assembly plant in Laguna, Philippines, with an annual assembly capacity of approximately 12,000 three-wheelers. The plant, which is intended to assemble both electric and internal combustion engine three-wheelers, was inaugurated by Philippine President Bongbong Marcos.

== Products ==
=== BAIC ===
The company reached an agreement with Chinese vehicle manufacturer BAIC to launch of three vehicles in Pakistan, which include:

- BAIC D20 - (Subcompact car)
- BAIC X25 - (Subcompact SUV)
- BAIC BJ40 - (Off-road SUV)

=== Great Wall Motor ===
The vehicles of Haval and Ora are assembled under a joint venture between Sazgar and Great Wall Motor of China.

- Haval H6 - (Compact SUV)
- Haval Jolion - (Compact SUV)
- Ora 03 - (Compact electric car)
