= Interloop Limited =

Pakistani textile manufacturer

- Native name: انٹرلوپ محدود
- Type: Public
- Traded as: PSX: ILP; KSE 100 component
- Industry: Textile
- Genre: Business-to-business
- Founded: 1992; 34 years ago
- Founders: Musadaq Zulqarnain; Navid Fazil; Tariq Rashid; Jahanzeb Khan Banth
- Headquarters: Faislabad, Pakistan
- Area served: Worldwide
- Key people: Musadaq Zulqarnain (Chairman); Navid Fazil (CEO)
- Products: Yarns, hosiery, denim, and apparel
- Revenue: ▲ Rs. 173.381 billion (US$620 million) (2025)
- Operating income: ▼ Rs. 8.786 billion (US$31 million) (2025)
- Net income: ▼ Rs. 5.376 billion (US$19 million) (2025)
- Total assets: ▲ Rs. 176.726 billion (US$630 million) (2025)
- Total equity: ▲ Rs. 55.223 billion (US$200 million) (2025)
- Number of employees: 37,786 (2025)
- Website: interloop-pk.com
- Footnotes; Financials as of 30 June 2025

Interloop Limited is a Pakistani textile manufacturer based in Faisalabad. It is the largest international hosiery manufacturer, supplying socks and leggings to retailers worldwide. It produces activewear, apparel, denim, and hosiery for a number of retailers including Nike, Adidas, Guess, Uniqlo, Marks & Spencer, Gymshark, H&M, Puma, Levi's, and Target.

The company has five hosiery manufacturing divisions, located in Pakistan, Bangladesh and Sri Lanka.

== History ==
Interloop was established in 1992 as a B2B manufacturer of socks and leggings by brothers Musadaq Zulqarnain and Navid Fazil along with Jahanzeb Khan Banth. After eight years, a second production unit was opened with 400 knitting machines installed.

In 2003, Interloop opened its first vertically integrated hosiery plant in Faisalabad in an effort to make its supply chain management more efficient. In 2005, the company opened their second hosiery plant, and launched a yarn dying division a year later, also in Faisalabad.

The company was converted into public limited company on July 18, 2008 from being private limited.

In March 2019, Interloop raised more than 5 billion PKR through Pakistan's largest private sector IPO, placing it amongst the top 50 companies listed on the Pakistan Stock Exchange by market capitalization.

== See also ==
- Textile industry in Pakistan
