= Meezan Bank =

Pakistani Islamic bank based in Karachi

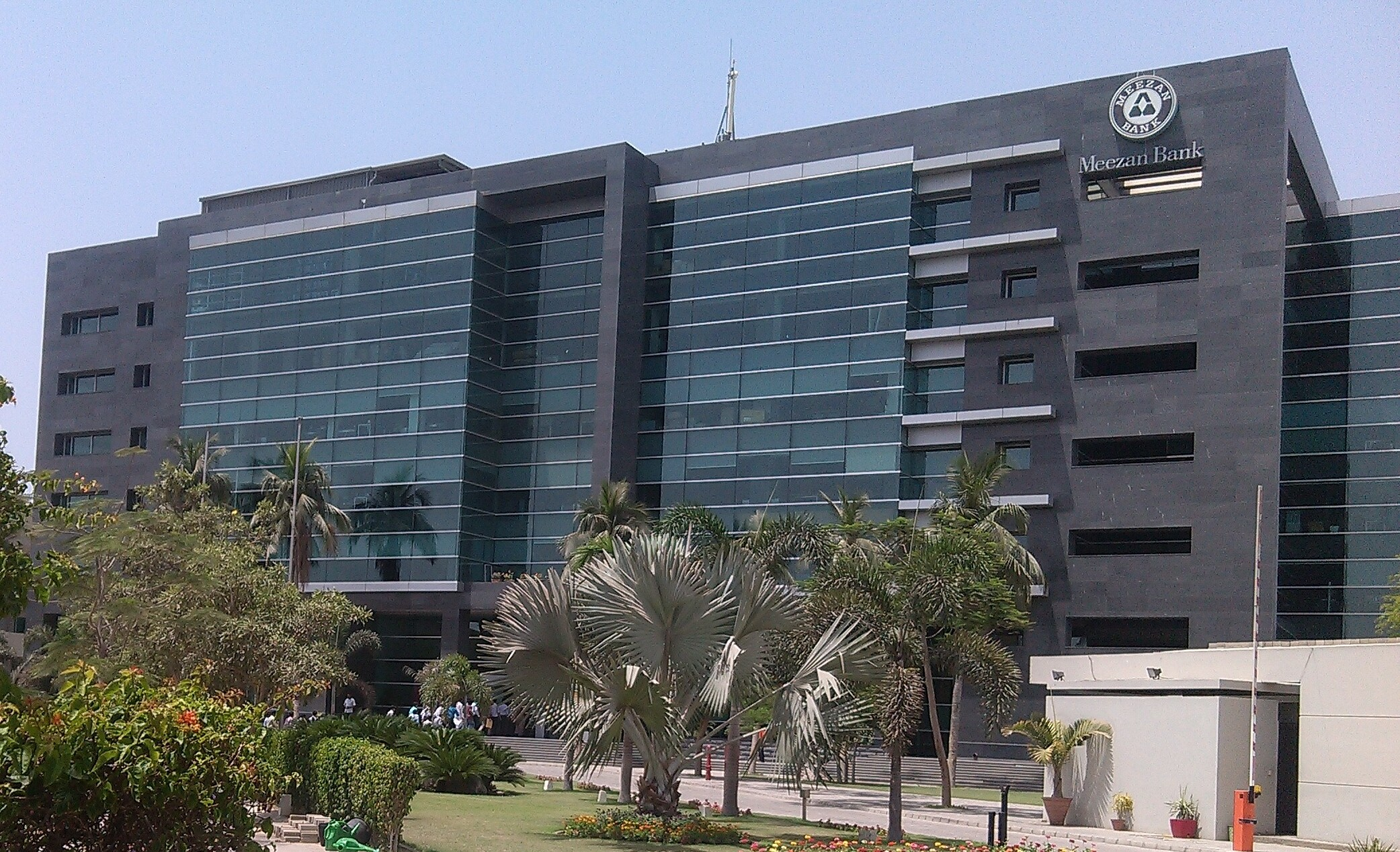
- Headquarters of Meezan Bank in Karachi
- Native name: میزان بینک
- Formerly: Al Meezan Investment Bank Limited (1997–2002)
- Type: Public
- Traded as: PSX: MEBL; KSE 100 component KSE 30 component
- Industry: Islamic banking
- Founded: 27 January 1997; 29 years ago
- Headquarters: Karachi-75700, Pakistan
- Number of locations: 1,105 (2025)
- Area served: Pakistan
- Key people: Riyadh S. A. A. Edrees (chairman); Syed Amir Ali (CEO)
- Services: Loans; Debit cards; Savings accounts; Consumer banking; Business banking; Premium banking
- Revenue: ▼ Rs. 285.10 billion (US$1.0 billion) (2025)
- Operating income: ▼ Rs. 194 billion (US$690 million) (2025)
- Net income: ▼ Rs. 89 billion (US$320 million) (2025)
- Total assets: ▲ Rs. 4.81 trillion (US$17 billion) (2025)
- Total equity: ▲ Rs. 279 billion (US$1.0 billion) (2025)
- Owner: Noor Financial Investment (35.03%); Pakistan Kuwait Investment Company (29.82%); Islamic Development Bank (9.27%)
- Number of employees: 20,391 (2025)
- Subsidiaries: Meezan Exchange Company (100%); Al Meezan Investment Management (65%)
- Website: meezanbank.com

Meezan Bank Limited (Urdu pronunciation: [mi.ˈzaːn bɛŋk] mee-ZAHN-BANK) is a Pakistani Islamic bank headquartered in Karachi. It is the largest Islamic bank and the second-largest bank based on market capitalization in Pakistan.

== History ==
Meezan Bank was founded as an Islamic investment bank in 1997 by Noor Financial, Pak Kuwait Investment Company, and Islamic Development Bank. It was then known as Al-Meezan Investment Bank.

In 2000, Meezan Bank was listed on the Karachi Stock Exchange.

In 2002, Meezan Bank acquired Pakistan operations of Société Générale. In its early years from 2002, Meezan Bank faced challenges gaining acceptance in Pakistan due to the unfamiliarity with Islamic banking and its stricter loan scrutiny. To overcome this, Meezan attracted deposits from religious Muslims and shifted focus to provide loans to SMEs, including those that previously avoided traditional banking for religious reasons, allowing it to serve an underserved segment.

In 2013, Noor Financial tried to sell its entire stake of 49.1 percent, valued at $190 million, to a British Virgin Island-based company named Vision Financial Holdings, but it was blocked by the State Bank of Pakistan.

In May 2014, Meezan Bank agreed to acquire Pakistani operations of HSBC Bank Middle East, which included 10 local branches and access to 75 multinational corporate clients. A year later, Meezan Bank acquired Pakistan operations of HSBC Oman consisting of a single branch.

In March 2019, Noor Financial sold 34.3 million Meezan Bank shares to institutional investors for $20.92 million. Previously, Noor Financial divested its stake multiple times in 2018.

In 2017, Meezan upgraded its core banking system, Temenos’ T24, to release 16.

== Shareholding pattern ==
The following is the shareholding structure of Meezan Bank, as of 30 June 2026:

- Noor Financial Investment Company (35.03 percent)
- Pak Kuwait Investment Company (29.82 percent)
- Islamic Development Bank (9.27 percent)
- Other shareholders (25.8 percent)

== Bibliography ==
- Gul Rashid, Amber; Usmani, Obaid; Ejaz, Lalarukh; Faraz, Hasan (2017-01-01). "Meezan Bank: category leader in Islamic banking". Emerald Emerging Markets Case Studies. 7 (4): 1–23. doi:10.1108/EEMCS-11-2016-0213. ISSN 2045-0621.
