= Maple Leaf Cement =

Pakistani building materials company

- Type: Public
- Traded as: PSX: MLCF; KSE 100 component KSE 30 component
- Industry: Cement
- Founded: 1956; 70 years ago
- Headquarters: Lahore, Pakistan
- Key people: Tariq Sayeed Saigol (Chairman); Sayeed Tariq Saigol (CEO)
- Revenue: ▲ Rs. 68.653 billion (US$250 million) (2025)
- Operating income: ▲ Rs. 19.107 billion (US$68 million) (2025)
- Net income: ▲ Rs. 11.503 billion (US$41 million) (2025)
- Total assets: ▲ Rs. 118.731 billion (US$420 million) (2025)
- Total equity: ▲ Rs. 70.959 billion (US$250 million) (2025)
- Owner: Kohinoor Textile Mills (56.50%)
- Number of employees: 1799 (2025)
- Parent: Kohinoor Textile Mills
- Subsidiaries: Maple Leaf Power Limited; Pioneer Cement
- Website: kmlg.com/mlcfl/profile
- Footnotes; Financials as of 30 June 2025

Maple Leaf Cement is a Pakistani cement manufacturer based in Lahore. It is one of the largest cement manufacturers in Pakistan.

== History ==
=== 1956–1992: Early history ===
Maple Leaf Cement was founded in 1956 by the West Pakistan Industrial Development Corporation in a collaboration with the Government of Canada. The initial production capacity was 120,000 tons per annum (tpa) of ordinary Portland cement, which increased by an additional 180,000 tpa in 1960.

In 1967, White Cement Industries Limited was founded at the same location which was the first white cement manufacturing plant in Pakistan. Initially, it had a capacity of 15,000 tpa which was later expanded to 30,000 tpa.

In 1974, under the West Pakistan Industrial Development Corporation Ordinance of 1974, Maple Leaf Cement and White Cement Industries were merged into the State Cement Corporation of Pakistan, a holding company established by the Government of Pakistan to manage nationalized cement companies.

In 1983, Pak Cement Company Limited was established at the same site with a clinker production capacity of 180,000 tons under a technical and economic assistance program with National Complete Plant Export Corporation of China.

=== 1992–present: Privitisation and growth ===
In January 1992, Maple Leaf Cement was acquired for Rs 486 million by Nishat Mills under the privatization scheme of the Government of Pakistan. Later, it was transferred to Saigol Group in a swap scheme in which Nishat Group acquired DG Cement from Saigol Group. Saigol family also acquired Pak Cement and White Cement Industries during the privatization scheme which were merged into Maple Leaf Cement Factory Limited on July 1, 1992.

In April 1994, Maple Leaf Cement began a project to expand its cement production capacity of annual grey portland cement from 0.6 million tons to 1.6 million tons. The project had a total cost of US$160.8 million. The International Finance Corporation (IFC) contributed US$45.2 million in financing to the project, which was part of a larger US$160 million investment program. The financing provided by the IFC consisted of a US$5.2 million equity investment, a US$30 million loan for IFC's own account, and an additional US$10 million loan. The remaining financing was raised by listing the company on the Karachi Stock Exchange on August 17, 1994. The financing was used to acquire a new cement plant from FLSmidth. The plant became operational in April 1998.

In 2004, Maple Leaf Cement initiated a process conversion project, transitioning a wet process plant with a clinker capacity of 600 tons per day (tpd) for grey cement to a dry process plant with a clinker capacity of 500 tpd for white cement. The project was completed, and commercial production commenced on April 1, 2006. Following the conversion, white cement production capacity increased from 30,000 tpa to 180,000 tpa. The total cost of the project was PKR 3,280 million.

In November 2022, Maple Leaf Cement commissioned a new grey clinker production line at its brownfield site in Iskanderabad, Punjab, Pakistan. The production line was supplied by Chengdu Design & Research Institute of China and increased the site's production capacity by 7000 tons per day. The total cost of the project was PKR 20 billion (approximately US$90.2 million at the time). The project was financed with a debt-to-equity ratio of 70:30, with funding obtained through the Long Term Financing Facility (LTFF) and Temporary Economic Refinance Facility (TERF) offered by the State Bank of Pakistan.

In 2026, Maple Leaf Cement acquired Pioneer Cement.

== Subsidiaries ==
- Pioneer Cement
