= TPL Properties =

Pakistani real estate company

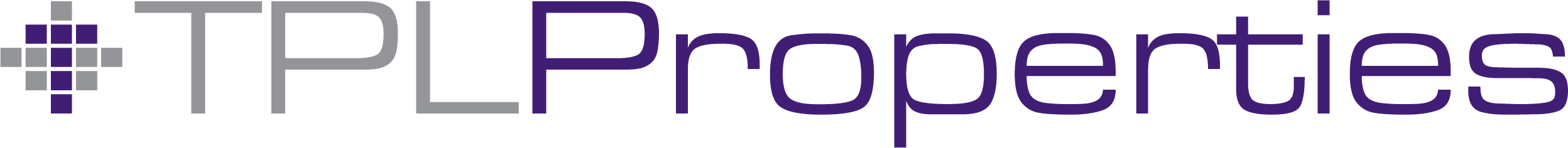
- Native name: ٹی پی ایل پراپرٹیز محدود
- Type: Public
- Traded as: PSX: TPLP
- ISIN: PK0110601017
- Industry: Real Estate
- Founded: 2007; 19 years ago
- Headquarters: Karachi, Pakistan
- Area served: Pakistan
- Key people: Ali Jameel (CEO); Jameel Yusuf S.St (chairman)
- Revenue: ▼ Rs. 5.508 billion (US$20 million) (2023)
- Operating income: ▼ Rs. 4.29 billion (US$15 million) (2023)
- Net income: ▼ Rs. 2.966 billion (US$11 million) (2023)
- Total assets: ▲ Rs. 19.118 billion (US$68 million) (2023)
- Total equity: ▲ Rs. 13.594 billion (US$49 million) (2023)
- Number of employees: 21 (2023)
- Subsidiaries: TPL Property Management; TPL Developments; TPL Logistic Park; TPL Technology Zone Phase-I; TPL REIT
- Website: tplproperty.com
- Footnotes; Financials as of 30 June 2023

TPL Properties Limited is a Pakistani real estate company headquartered in Karachi.

== History ==
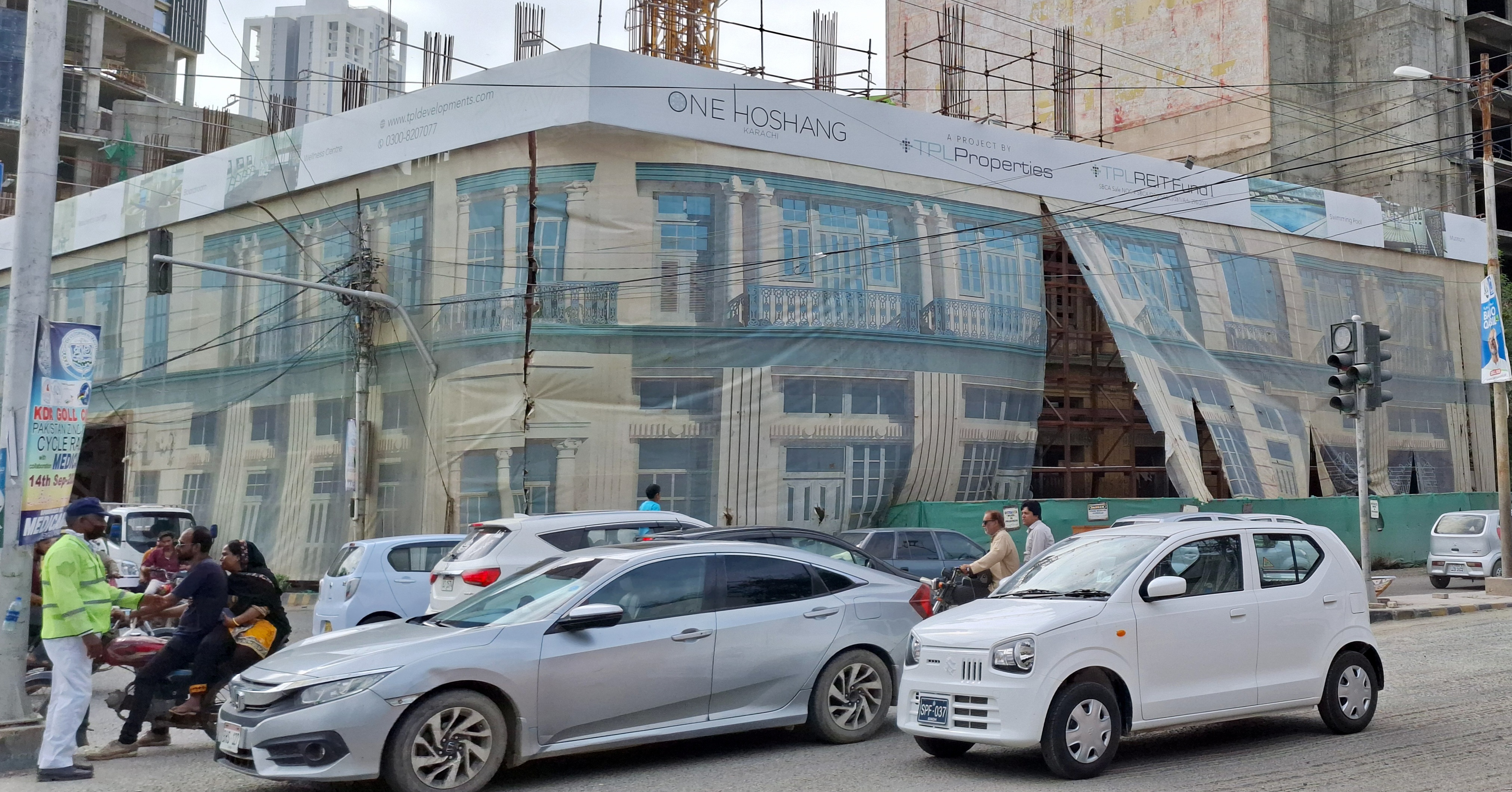
One Hoshang Project under-construction in Karachi

Founded in 2007, TPL Properties is engaged in investing, purchasing, along with development of real estate including residential and commercial buildings. The company also sells, rents out, or disposes off the real estate.

In 2016, TPL Properties changed its status from a private limited company to a public company and was listed on the Pakistan Stock Exchange, following an initial public offering at a strike price of PKR 12.50.

In December 2022, TPL REIT Management Company Limited (TPLRMC) jointly partnered with UAE-based TASC Towers to acquire a portfolio of 10,500 telecom towers in Pakistan.

== Subsidiaries ==
- TPL Property Management
- TPL Developments
- TPL Logistic Park
- TPL Technology Zone Phase-I
- TPL REIT
