= GSK Pakistan =

Pakistani pharmaceutical company

- Native name: گلاکسو سمتھ کلائن پاکستان محدود
- Formerly: Glaxo Laboratories (Pakistan) Ltd (1951–1996); Glaxo Wellcome Pakistan Ltd (1996–2002)
- Type: Public
- Traded as: PSX: GLAXO; KSE 100 component
- Industry: Pharmaceutical
- Founded: 1951; 75 years ago
- Headquarters: Karachi, Pakistan
- Area served: Pakistan
- Key people: Erum Shakir Rahim (CEO)
- Products: Prescription drugs Vaccines
- Revenue: ▲ Rs. 41.84 billion (US$150 million) (2022)
- Operating income: ▼ Rs. 5.10 billion (US$18 million) (2022)
- Net income: ▼ Rs. 2.46 billion (US$8.8 million) (2022)
- Total assets: ▲ Rs. 22.63 billion (US$81 million) (2022)
- Total equity: ▲ Rs. 21.05 billion (US$75 million) (2022)
- Number of employees: 1,768 (2022)
- Parent: GSK
- Website: pk.gsk.com

GSK Pakistan (legally known as GlaxoSmithKline Pakistan Limited) is a Pakistani pharmaceutical company based in Karachi. It is a subsidiary of British company GSK plc. It is the largest pharmaceutical company in Pakistan.

== History ==
=== Glaxo Laboratories (Pakistan) ===
Before the partition, Glaxo ran its business in the region from a branch in Lahore that R. A. M. Henson, a director of its Indian subsidiary, had opened in 1937. At partition in 1947, the Hindu and Sikh employees who made up almost all of Glaxo's staff in the new Pakistan left for India. In Pakistan, Glaxo replaced its branch and agency arrangements with a separate local subsidiary, headquartered in Karachi instead of Lahore. Glaxo Laboratories (Pakistan) Ltd was incorporated in March 1948, with Henson as managing director.

The company started with £7,500 in subscribed capital and a loan of £86,250 from Glaxo's Indian company. A rise in its issued capital to £375,000 needed government approval, which came in late 1950 after lengthy talks, on condition that 30 percent be held locally. A public share issue drew applications for double the Rs 18 lakh of shares set aside for Pakistani subscribers, and closed after four days. It became a public limited company in 1953, the first of Glaxo's subsidiaries to do so. Glaxo still held 70 percent of it in 1989.

Penicillin alone brought in 34 percent of its 1951 sales, more than any other product, and was selling its drugs in East and West Pakistan. To fill antibiotic vials and pack infant food locally, the company began planning a Karachi factory in late 1950. The Pakistan Industrial Development Corporation took the first site for its Karachi Shipyard, which delayed the project, and the factory on West Wharf Road began production in July 1955. In 1959, the company settled on Renala Khurd, in Punjab, as the place to collect and dry milk.

With the Karachi factory in production, Henson shifted his focus to East Pakistan, where he planned a purpose-built factory in Chittagong in place of rented premises. A one-for-one rights issue in 1961 raised £1.32 million for the project. Production at a Glaxo factory in Chittagong began in the 1960s. In 1972, Glaxo placed Pakistan and Bangladesh among six special trading areas. By the early 1990s, the company was strong in antibiotics (chiefly Ceporex), in anti-ulcer treatment with Zantac, and in dermatological products such as the Betnovate range. It had also spent heavily on plants for making raw materials.

=== Mergers ===
The British drug company Burroughs Wellcome set up a company in Pakistan between 1954 and 1960. By 1960, Burroughs Wellcome & Company (Pakistan) and Beecham Pakistan were both members of the Karachi Chamber of Commerce and Industry. In January 1982, Lord Franks, chairman of the Wellcome Trust, opened new offices and a factory for Wellcome Pakistan. In the early 1990s, Wellcome owned 70 percent of Wellcome Pakistan, which was based at F-268 in Karachi's Sindh Industrial Trading Estate (SITE). On August 27, 1996, Glaxo Laboratories (Pakistan) and Wellcome Pakistan merged to form Glaxo Wellcome Pakistan Ltd.

Later, Pakistani subsidiaries of Glaxo Wellcome and SmithKline Beecham were also merged. SmithKline Beecham's two Pakistani companies were Smith Kline & French of Pakistan Ltd (SK&F), 75 percent owned by its parent in 1989, and Beecham Pakistan (Private) Ltd, 60 percent owned by its parent in 1992. In 2002, both companies were merged into Glaxo Wellcome Pakistan. Beecham shareholders received 2.5 shares of Rs 10 for every Rs 100 share and SK&F shareholders one share for each share held, after which the two companies were dissolved without being wound up. The merger, the largest in Pakistan up to that time, created GlaxoSmithKline Pakistan and raised its outstanding shares to 61 million. M. Salman Burney, the company's chairman and chief executive, had helped to put the merger together.

=== GlaxoSmithKline Pakistan ===
GlaxoSmithKline's former logo, 2001-9 June 2022

In December 2008, GSK Pakistan acquired operations of Bristol Myers Squibb in Pakistan for approximately US$36.5 million. In December 2010, GSK acquired Stiefel Laboratories operations in Pakistan. In February 2015, GSK acquired the Novartis vaccine business, excluding influenza vaccines.

In 2015, GlaxoSmithKline Consumer Healthcare Pakistan Limited (GSKCH) was demerged from GlaxoSmithKline Pakistan Limited (GLAXO). In 2016, GSKCH started operations as an independent company. A year later, in 2017, GSKCH got listed on PSX. In 2022, GlaxoSmithKline Consumer Healthcare Pakistan Limited was renamed to Haleon Pakistan.

In September 2019, DRAP ordered companies to stop making ranitidine medicines and recall them after the probable carcinogen NDMA was found in some products. GSK Pakistan had already begun recalling its ranitidine brand, Zantac, and in 2020 it stopped making and supplying the drug in Pakistan.

In March 2020, Erum Shakir Rahim succeeded Aziz Ul Haq as chief executive. In April 2024, a drug court in Rawalpindi passed sentences on the chief executive and three other officials over a batch of Septran tablets, sampled in 2018, that a drug-testing laboratory had declared substandard. It fined the chief executive Rs 4.7 million and ordered her held until the court rose for the day, and gave the other three two years in prison and Rs 600,000 fines each.
