= Central Depository Company of Pakistan =

Pakistani securities depository company

Central Depository Company

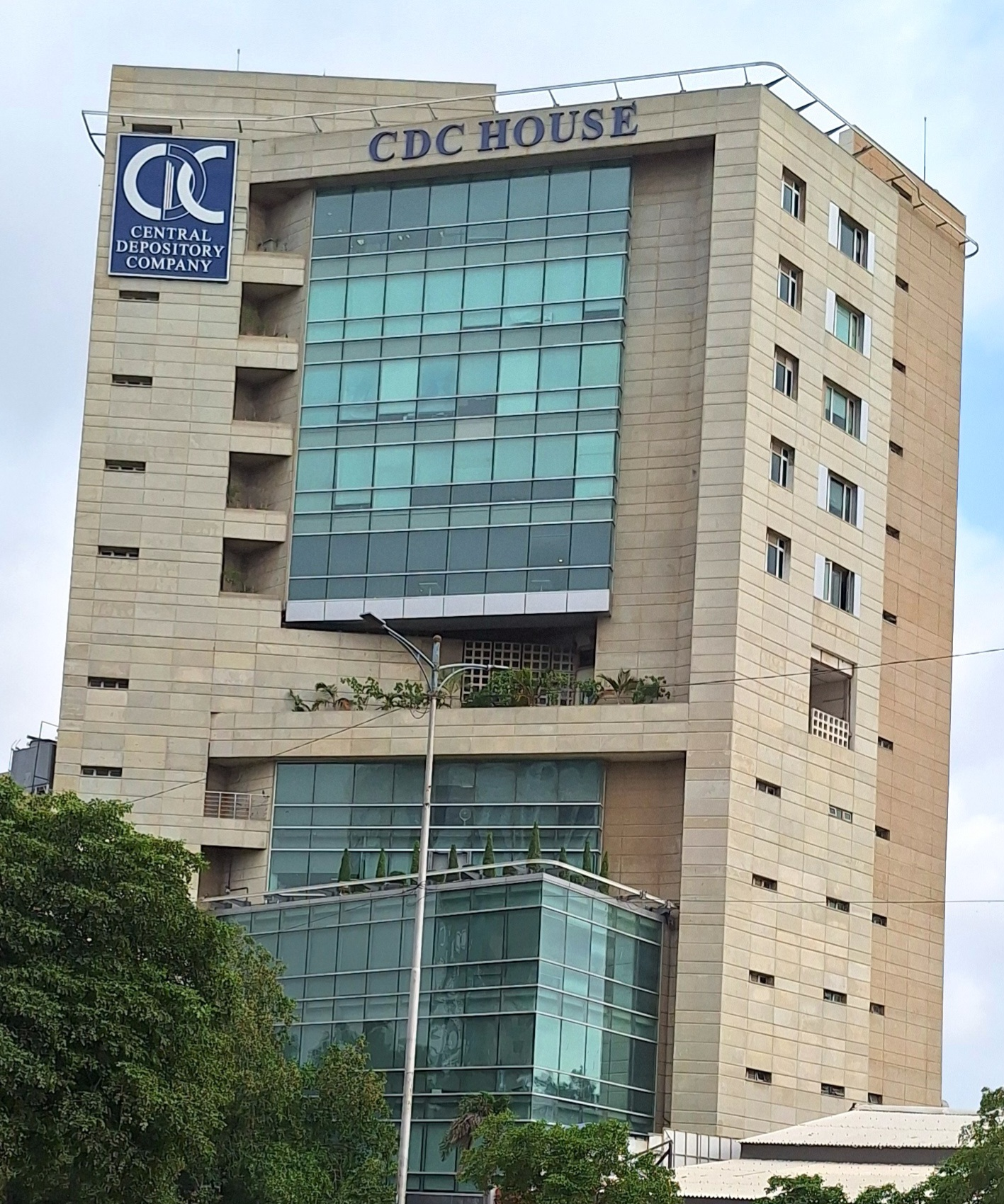
- CDC House in Karachi
- Native name: شرکت ذخیرہ خانہ مرکزی
- Type: Unlisted public company
- Industry: Securities
- Founded: 1997; 29 years ago
- Headquarters: Karachi, Pakistan
- Area served: Pakistan
- Key people: Badiuddin Akber (CEO); Farrukh Sabzwari (Chairman)
- Revenue: ▲ Rs. 2.473 billion (US$8.8 million) (2023)
- Operating income: ▼ Rs. 663.374 million (US$2.4 million) (2023)
- Net income: ▲ Rs. 849.400 million (US$3.0 million) (2023)
- Total assets: ▲ Rs. 7.925 billion (US$28 million) (2023)
- Total equity: ▲ Rs. 6.591 billion (US$24 million) (2023)
- Owner: Pakistan Stock Exchange (39.81%); MCB Bank Limited (15%); Habib Bank Limited (11.35%); LSE Ventures Limited (10%); National Investment Trust (6.35%); Industrial Development Bank of Pakistan (5%); Pak China Investment Company Limited (5%)
- Parent: Pakistan Stock Exchange
- Website: cdcpakistan.com
- Footnotes; Financials as of 30 June 2023

Central Depository Company of Pakistan (CDC) is a Pakistani central securities depository company which provides services for equity, debt and other financial instruments. It is based in Karachi, Pakistan.

CDC is regulated by the Securities and Exchange Commission of Pakistan. The current CEO is Badiuddin Akber.

== History ==
Central Depository Company was founded in 1997.

In 1999, the CDC introduced Investor Account Services, allowing both retail and corporate investors to open and maintain custody accounts directly with the company.

The CDC expanded its services in 2002 with the launch of Trustee and Custodial Services. The service functions as a trustee to open-end and closed-end mutual funds and voluntary pension schemes.

In 2008, the company established CDC Share Registrar Services Limited, a wholly owned subsidiary. It provides registrar and transfer agent services to share-issuing companies, handling customer interactions on behalf of these companies.

ITMinds Limited, another wholly owned subsidiary of the CDC, was established in 2009. The subsidiary provides business process outsourcing (BPO) services, focusing on back office accounting functions for the mutual fund industry.

In 2014, the CDC launched the Centralized Information Sharing Solution for Insurance Industry (CISSII). Managed by the CDC, CISSII is an online platform designed to facilitate information sharing within the insurance industry, covering aspects such as claims processing, risk management, agent activities, and group life claims experience.

In 2017, the CDC introduced eServices, a web portal providing services such as the Centralized eIPO System, which allows for electronic applications for share subscriptions, and the eDividend Repository, which provides investors with consolidated information on cash benefits and dividend disbursements.

== Shareholding pattern ==
Shareholders	% of Shareholding
Pakistan Stock Exchange	39.81
MCB Bank Limited	15.00
Habib Bank Limited	11.35
LSE Ventures Limited	10.00
National Investment Trust Limited	6.35
Industrial Development Bank	5.00
Pak China Investment Company Limited	5.00
Last updated: December 2023

== See also ==
- Asia-Pacific Central Securities Depository Group
