= National Development Finance Corporation =

Corporation owned by the Government of Pakistan

Agency overview
- Formed: 1973
- Dissolved: 2001
- Superseding agency: National Bank of Pakistan
- Jurisdiction: Government of Pakistan
- Headquarters: Pakistan
- Parent department: Ministry of Finance (Pakistan)

The National Development Finance Corporation (NDFC) was a corporation owned by the Government of Pakistan, with the original main purpose of providing financing to public enterprises. Later its objectives were expanded to provide financing to private enterprises as well. It was created in 1973 through an Act of Parliament of Pakistan, adopted during the premiership of Zulfikar Ali Bhutto. The NDFC was amalgamated into the National Bank of Pakistan, by the regime of military dictator General Pervez Musharraf in 2001.
