= Martin Dow =

Pakistani pharmaceutical company founded 1995

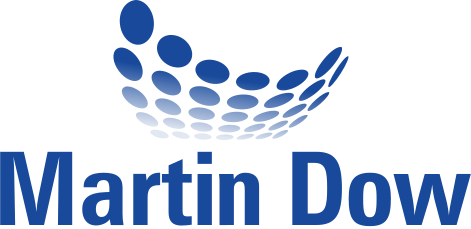
- Company type: Private
- Industry: Pharmaceutical
- Founded: 1995; 31 years ago
- Founder: Muhammad Jawed Akhai
- Headquarters: Karachi, Pakistan
- Area served: Asia, Middle East, Europe, Africa
- Products: ADVIT-D, BUSCOPAN PLUS, CONCOR, GLUCOPHAGE, INFEXIN CAPS, KLARIBACT, MERCIP, NEUROBION, POLYBION, ROZANTO, SANGOBION, TIXOMER, VONOSPIRE, WINTOGENO
- Revenue: ▲ Rs. 3630 crore (US$130 million) (2023)
- Number of employees: 1,000+
- Subsidiaries: Martin Dow Limited; Martin Dow Marker Ltd. Martin Dow Specialities (Pvt.) Ltd. Martin Dow Pharmaceuticals (France)
- Website: martindow.com

Martin Dow is a Pakistani multinational pharmaceutical company which is based in Karachi. It was founded in 1995 and has six manufacturing facilities in Pakistan and one in France.

== History ==
Martin Dow was founded in 1995 and began operations in 2000 with a small manufacturing facility in Lahore.

In 2010, Martin Dow acquired the manufacturing facility and brands of Roche Pakistan.

In 2015, Martin Dow was recognized as a Global Growth Company by the World Economic Forum. In the same year, Martin Dow entered into an alliance with Biocodex S.A., a France-based pharmaceutical company.

In 2016, German Merck KGaA executed a binding contract to divest its shareholding in Pakistan to Martin Dow Ltd.

In 2016, in a €1.5 million deal, Martin Dow acquired the Laboratoires Salem (before 2010 Bristol-Myers Squibb) pharmaceutical manufacturing facility in Meymac, France. In March 2017, the French President Francois Hollande inaugurated Martin Dow Pharma's Meymac Plant in France. The plant of V2Pharm in Gien, France was also taken over by Martin Dow.

In 2020, Martin Dow was awarded for excellent performance in fire safety and protection by the Sindh local government minister.

== Controversy ==
In 2016, the National Accountability Bureau (NAB) arrested two directors of Martin Dow because it wrongfully derived financial benefits on the basis of illegal price increase.
