= Sui Northern Gas Pipelines Limited =

Pakistani Gas Company

- Type: Public
- Traded as: PSX: SNGP; KSE 100 component KSE 30 component
- Industry: Oil & Gas
- Founded: 1963
- Headquarters: Head Office in Lahore, Pakistan
- Area served: Punjab, Khyber Pakhtunkhwa, Azad Kashmir & Islamabad
- Key people: Muhammad Ismail Qureshi (Chairman); Amer Tufail (CEO)
- Products: Natural Gas Transmission & Distribution
- Revenue: ▲ Rs. 1.53 trillion (US$5.5 billion) (2024)
- Operating income: ▲ Rs. 29.84 billion (US$110 million) (2024)
- Net income: ▲ Rs. 18.97 billion (US$68 million) (2024)
- Total assets: ▲ Rs. 1.64 trillion (US$5.9 billion) (2024)
- Number of employees: 8,004 (2024)
- Website: www.sngpl.com.pk

Sui Northern Gas Pipeline Limited (Urdu: سوئی محدود) is a Pakistani state-owned gas distribution company based in Lahore. It is listed on the Pakistan Stock Exchange.

SNGPL is the largest integrated gas company serving more than 7.22 million consumers in north central Pakistan through an extensive network in Punjab, Khyber Pakhtunkhwa and Azad Jammu & Kashmir.

The main transmissions regions of SNGPL are Faisalabad, Lahore, Multan, and Wah. The maximum diameter used in the transmission pipelines is around 42 inches. The company has 16 distribution regions.

SNGPL takes gas in 2 ways. The first one is 'System Gas' and the second is 'RLNG'. In the case of System Gas, the gas obtained from local resources is about 750-800 mmcd. While in the case of RLNG (Re-gasified Liquified Natural gas), gas is imported from foreign countries in the form of liquid in a closed container.

The Company took over the existing Sui-Multan System with 349 kilometres (217 miles) of 410 millimetres (16 in) and 130 kilometres (80 miles) of 250 millimetres (10 in) diameter pipelines from Pakistan Industrial Development Corporation (PIDC) and Dhulian-Rawalpindi-Wah system with 132 kilometres (82 miles) of 150 millimetres (6 in) diameter pipeline from Attock Oil Company. The Company's commercial operations commenced by selling an average of 1.3 million cubic metres (47 million cubic feet) per day gas in two regions viz. Multan and Rawalpindi.

== History ==
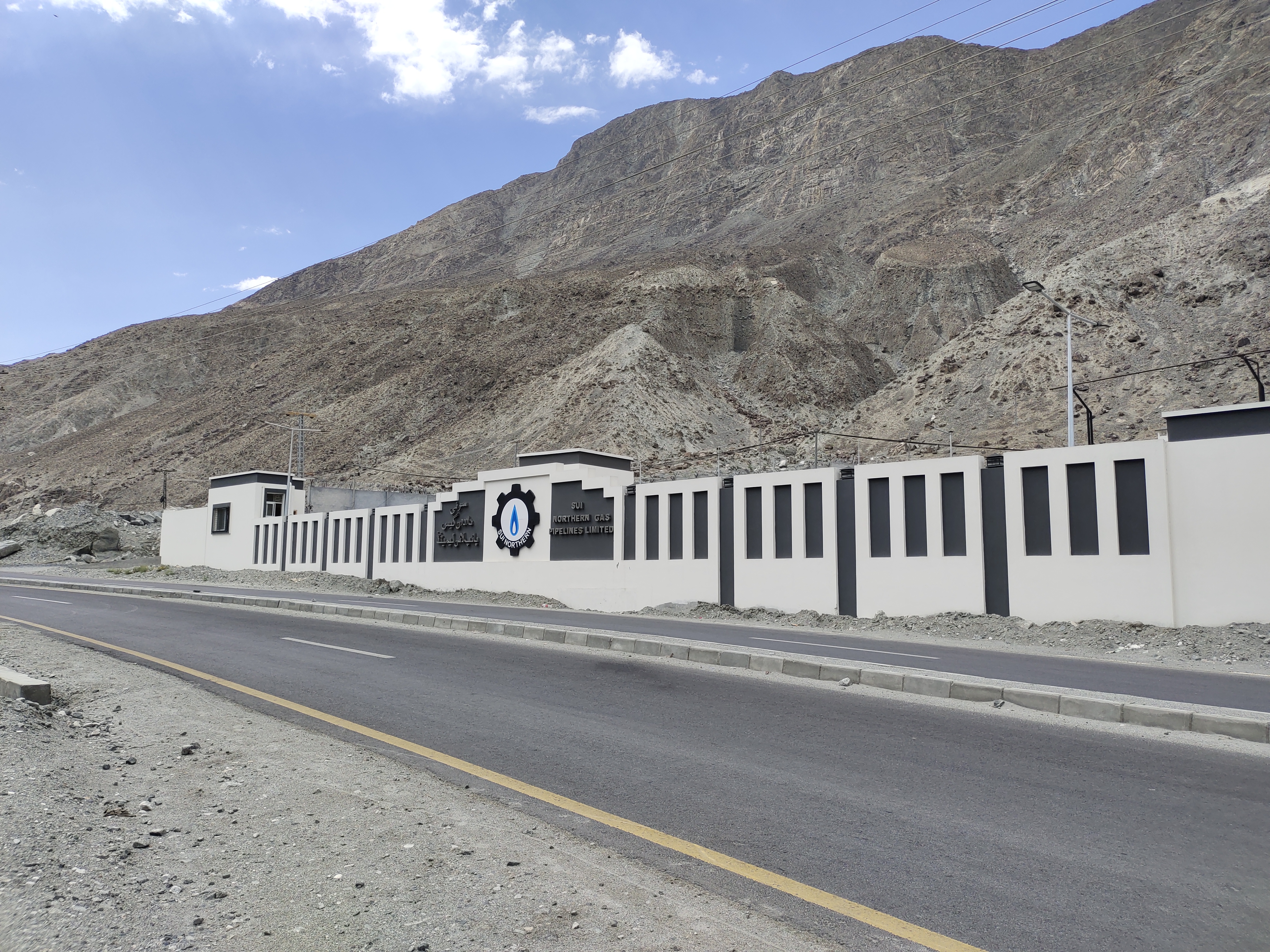
Head office of Sui Northern Gas Pipelines Limited Plant in Gilgit branch

Sui Northern Gas Pipelines Limited was incorporated as a private limited company in 1963 and later converted into a public limited company in January 1964 under the Indian Companies Act 1913 of British India.

== See also ==
- Sui Northern Gas Pipelines Limited cricket team
- Sui gas field
