= Saigol Group =

Pakistani conglomerate

The Saigol Group (Urdu pronunciation: [ˈsɛɡ.əl] SEG-uhl) is a group of companies headquartered in Lahore, Pakistan. It was founded by Ameen Saigol in the 1930s with a small shop that eventually developed into the Kohinoor Rubber Works. Ameen Saigol had four sons: Yousaf, Sayeed, Gull and Bashir.

== History ==
The Saigol family were originally farmers from a small town called Khotian, Chakwal District, Punjab, Pakistan. Khotian town was later named Saigolabad after this family. Sayeed Saigol moved to Calcutta in the 1930s and opened a shoe store. He opened a rubber shoe factory, and was a supplier of rubber shoes and raincoats to the Allied Forces during World War II.

Saigol, anticipating the division and independence of British India, moved his assets to Lahore in the early 1940s. After the independence of Pakistan in 1947, with the help of his three brothers Yousaf, Gull and Bashir, he set up their first textile spinning mill in Lyallpur (now called Faisalabad) in 1949 under the name of Kohinoor Industries. In 1953 a second textile plant was constructed near Rawalpindi and incorporated as Kohinoor Textile Mills. Later the family expanded its textile business more to Rawalpindi and Gujjar Khan, and bought a sugar mill in Jauharabad from the Pakistan Industrial Development Corporation. In 1958–59, the Saigols founded the United Bank Limited. During the same era from 1957 to 1984, they also established Kohinoor Cotton Mills in Tehsil Liaqatabad/Piplan, District Mianwali.

From 1960 to 1971, Saigol Family also established United Bank Limited and United Chemical Industries. At that time, the group was operating in almost every sector of the economy; from textile, power and cement to banking, electronics and chemicals.

In 1972, Zulfikar Ali Bhutto regime started its nationalization drive and most businesses of the Saigol Group were nationalized over the next four years. By 1976, only the textile and sugar businesses remained.

Then under General Zia-ul-Haq's regime beginning in 1977 reprivatization of industries started. In the early 1980s, the Saigol Group started rebuilding and reinvesting after their losses due to nationalization of industries in Pakistan during the 1970s.

The group is now managed by different Saigol brothers/cousins: Tariq Saigol (son of Sayyed Saigol), Naseem Saigol (son of Yousaf Saigol), and Iqbal Saigol (son of Bashir Saigol). Naseem's sister Naz Saigol is married to Mian Muhammad Mansha.

Tariq Saigol is head of Kohinoor-Maple group, which owns the Kohinoor textile mills and Maple-Leaf Cement. He is known to be openly critical of the Pakistani government's lack of interest in the textile sector. Naseem Saigol heads Saigol Group including PEL and Kohinoor industries. Iqbal Saigol is the head of Muhib Group.

== List of companies ==
The group currently owns following companies:

=== Listed ===
- Maple Leaf Cement
- Pak Elektron Limited (PEL)
- Kohinoor Energy Limited
- Kohinoor Industries Limited
- Kohinoor Mills Limited
- Kohinoor Power Company Limited
- Kohinoor Textile Mills Limited
- Saritow Spinning Mills Limited

=== Unlisted ===
- Kohinoor Ginning Factory, Multan
- Saigol Computers
- Azam Textile Mills Limited, Lahore
- Kohinoor Motor Works, joint-venture with Qingqi Rickshaws
- The Four Seasons Private Limited
- RED Publicis

== Former subsidiaries ==
- Kohinoor Sugar Mills, also known as Jauharabad Sugar Mills District Khushab
- Kohinoor Cotton Mills Liaqatabad/Piplan District Mianwali

=== Nationalised ===
- United Chemicals Limited, Kala Shah Kaku
- Kohinoor Engineering Limited, Kala Shah Kaku
- Insecticides (Pakistan) Limited, Kala Shah Kaku
- Kohinoor Oil Mills, Kala Shah Kaku (formerly a listed company)
- Kohinoor Rayon Limited, Kala Shah Kaku
- United Bank Limited

=== East Pakistan ===
- United Bank Limited branches in East Pakistan, now known as Janata Bank
- Kohinoor Chemicals
- Kohinoor Jute Mills
- Kohinoor Spinning Mills

== Family members ==
- Yousaf Saigol (1911-1992) Son of Ameen Saigol
- Sayyed Saigol (1913-1985) Son of Ameen Saigol
- Bashir Saigol (1918-1988) Son of Ameen Saigol
- Rafique Saigol (1933–2003), a member of the National Assembly, Son of Yousaf Saigol
- Shafique Saigol (1936–2010) Son of Yousaf Saigol
- Iqbal Saigol (b. 1940) Son of Bashir Saigol
- Khalid Saigol (b. 1940) Son of Sayyed Saigol
- Naseem Saigol (b. 1943) Son of Yousaf Saigol
- Tariq Saigol (b. 1948) Son of Sayyed Saigol
- Taufeeq Saigol (b. 1950) Son of Sayyed Saigol
- Azam Saigol (1951–2018) Son of Yousaf Saigol
- Asif Saigol (b. 1953) Son of Yousaf Saigol
