= Lucky Core Industries =

Pakistani chemical company

- Formerly: Khewra Soda Ash Company (1944–1947); ICI Pakistan (1947–2022)
- Type: Public
- Traded as: PSX: LCI; KSE 100 component
- Industry: Chemical
- Founded: 1944; 82 years ago
- Headquarters: Karachi, Pakistan
- Area served: Pakistan
- Key people: Asif Jooma (CEO)
- Revenue: ▼ Rs. 119.94 billion (US$430 million) (2025)
- Operating income: ▲ Rs. 18.03 billion (US$64 million) (2025)
- Net income: ▲ Rs. 11.76 billion (US$42 million) (2025)
- Total assets: ▲ Rs. 104.33 billion (US$370 million) (2025)
- Total equity: ▲ Rs. 54.99 billion (US$200 million) (2025)
- Owner: Lucky Cement (55%); Yunus Textile Mills (12%); Gadoon Textile Mills (7.20%); Lucky Textile Mills (6.23%); Others (Free Float)
- Number of employees: 2,574 (2025)
- Parent: Lucky Cement
- Website: luckycore.com
- Footnotes; Financials as of 30 June 2025

Lucky Core Industries Limited, formerly known as ICI Pakistan, is a Pakistani conglomerate company headquartered in Karachi. It manufactures polyester, pharmaceutical, agrochemical, soda ash, and veterinary medicine.

== History ==
=== 1944–1947: Early history ===
The company's history dates back to British colonial-era when it was established as Khewra Soda Ash Company in 1944. They set up a soda ash manufacturing facility in Khewra, Punjab, Pakistan with a capacity of 18,000 tonnes per annum. This facility was sited next to the Khewra salt range, Punjab, Pakistan because rock salt and limestone; two key raw materials for manufacturing soda ash were available. The construction of the company's initial facility began in the late 1930s, but was interrupted by World War II when a German U-boat torpedoed the ship carrying essential equipment. Despite this setback, the facility eventually commenced commercial production in the early to mid-1940s as part of the Alkali Chemical Corporation of India (ACCI), which was headquartered in Calcutta.

=== 1947–1965: Growth of trading and soda ash business under British management ===
After the partition of India, the company was incorporated in Pakistan as the Khewra Soda Company and came under the control of ICI Pakistan, which was headquartered in Katrak Mansion. In the 1950s and 1960s, ICI Pakistan's operations included a small local soda ash manufacturing business and a trading business, importing various chemicals and materials from over 100 overseas suppliers. During this period, ICI constructed a custom-built office at West Wharf on leased Karachi Port Trust land, which primarily served as a large warehouse for repackaging and labeling imported bulk products into smaller retail packs for nationwide distribution. ICI Pakistan also acted as an indenting agent for various products, supporting Pakistani importers and industries.

The company was listed on the Karachi Stock Exchange in July 1957. It managed through offices in Karachi and Lahore, with the latter located in the Co-operative Insurance building opposite the Lahore High Court on the Mall. ICI Pakistan operated a prosperous trading business with the support of a network of distributors. Despite its local operations, the company maintained a colonial model of management, with the chairman enjoying high social status and close connections with the President of Pakistan.

=== 1965–1987: Introduction of local management and diversification ===
In 1965, Y. M. Khan became the first Pakistani chairman of ICI Pakistan at the age of 38. During Khan's leadership, ICI Pakistan focused on industrial expansion, establishing a textile auxiliaries plant in Karachi, a pharmaceutical factory in Narayanganj in East Pakistan, and acquired the Fuller Paints factory in Lahore which was later renamed as Paintex. The Soda Ash Works were also expanded during this period. The pharmaceutical factory in Narayanganj later became part of ICI Bangladesh. Two new entities, ICI Pakistan Manufacturers Ltd (PML) and Paintex Ltd, were created to manage textile auxiliaries and paints business respectively. During this period, ICI Pakistan also entered negotiations with the Fauji Foundation to establish a Naphtha cracker plant, a critical project for industrialization, but the joint venture was never finalized.

In the late 1960s and throughout the 1970s, ICI Pakistan focused on expanding and modernizing its manufacturing base while maintaining its import trading business. The company set up a polyester fiber manufacturing plant near Sheikhupura, which began production in the early 1980s.

In the 1980s, ICI Pakistan established a captive power plant named ICI Power Gen at the Sheikhupura site.

=== 1987–present: Mergers, acquisitions, and growth ===
In 1987, the company merged Paintex Limited, ICI Pakistan Manufacturers Limited, and Imperial Chemical Industries Limited into a single entity.

In 1995, ICI Pakistan Limited set up a US$490 million PTA manufacturing facility at Port Qasim, near Karachi, which was commissioned in 1998 to manufacture purified terephthalic acid (PTA) in Pakistan, aiming to complete the textile chain in Pakistan. The project was supported by the Government of Pakistan which gave incentives in form of favorable tariffs. In 2001, the business was demerged or spun off to form Pakistan PTA Limited, and later became a separate listed company.

In 2008, Dutch paints and chemicals giant AkzoNobel acquired the global parent company Imperial Chemical Industries (ICI).

In May 2012, AkzoNobel, the new parent company, demerged ICI Pakistan into two companies: AkzoNobel Pakistan focused on paint business, and ICI Pakistan, focused on soda ash, polyster fiber, pharmaceuticals, and animal health. Later, in the same year, Yunus Brothers Group acquired the company for $152m from the Dutch paints giant AkzoNobel.

In 2022, the company was renamed as Lucky Core Industries.

In May 2024, Lucky acquired Pfizer Pakistan's sole manufacturing facility in Pakistan.

== Businesses ==
Installed capacity of Lucky Core Industries
Product	Installed capacity (tonnes)
Soda ash	560,000
Sodium bicarbonate	54,000
Polyester staple fiber	122,250

=== Polyester ===
ICI Pakistan pioneered polyester staple fibre (PSF) technology in Pakistan through its investment in a 12,000 tonnes per annum PSF plant commissioned in 1982 in Sheikhupura, near Lahore. Polyester fibre is used in cars, bedding and clothes.

=== Soda ash ===
While the soda ash plant dates back to 1939, commercial production began in 1944. Over the years, the capacity of the plant has been increased through expansion in line with market demand. The total capacity of the plant today is 500,000 tons per annum. Besides, the business also has a production capacity of 630 tons per day of dense ash (Na_{2}CO_{3}.H_{2}O), which is an essential raw material for glass making, and 160 tons per day of Refined Sodium Bicarbonate.

ICI Pakistan's soda ash business caters to approximately 70% of the country's total soda ash requirement. The business mainly uses indigenous raw materials and locally made equipment. The plant is located in Khewra, near the Khewra salt range.

=== Pharmaceuticals ===
ICI Pakistan Limited entered into the manufacturing sphere in both pharmaceuticals and nutraceuticals, through the acquisition and set-up of several state-of-the-art manufacturing facilities.

The Company has two fully equipped facilities for pharmaceutical manufacturing including:

- Wholly owned subsidiary Cirin Pharmaceuticals (Private) Limited, which has its manufacturing facility in Hattar, KPK. The products manufactured at our Cirin plant include; anti-infectives, sterile liquid injectables, oral solid dosage, anti-virals, analgesics, gastroenterology, intensive care and anxiolytics.
- Manufacturing facility at Hawke’s Bay Road, Karachi. Acquired from Wyeth Pakistan Limited.

=== Animal Health ===
ICI Pakistan Limited's Animal Health business offers products encompassing a wide range of therapeutic categories: anthelmintics, antiprotozoals, antibacterials, restoratives, intrauterine, udder health, growth promoters, disinfectants, dairy and poultry nutrition, insemination, and biologicals catering to the industry’s livestock and poultry segments.

The business has partnered with leading animal health companies of the world including MSD Animal Health, Elanco, Bayer Animal Health, Trouw Nutrition, Lanxess, Mervue Laboratories, Cogent Breeding UK, ST Genetics, Berg + Schmidt, Choong Ang Vaccine Laboratories (CAVAC), Champrix, Vemo 99 Ltd and Norbrook Laboratories to create international synergies and bring global advancements to Pakistan.

=== Chemicals & Agri Sciences ===
ICI Pakistan Chemicals and Agri Sciences business consists of General Chemicals and Specialty Chemicals (formerly Uniqema) as well as Agriculture Products ranging from seeds to pesticides.

The General Chemicals Segment includes trading and polyurethanes and is involved in the import, manufacturing, sale and distribution of industrial chemicals. The trading segment comprises a portfolio of fourteen product groupings with over 250 products/variants, including trading partners such as National Starch & Chemicals, Huntsman Polyurethanes, Ineos Chlor, Nalco, Huntsman Tioxide, supplemented by imports of complementary product lines from companies in the US, Europe and the Far East. This Segment markets a product range used for various applications including power, cement, textiles, paints, pharmaceuticals, personal care, food & beverage, solvents, detergents, footwear and household appliances.

=== Infant milk formula ===
Since 2014, ICI Pakistan is importing, marketing and distributing selected Morinaga Milk Industry of Japan's infant milk formula products under the brand name of NutriCo Pakistan.

== Factories ==
ICI Pakistan operates factories in the following cities:

- Lahore
- Sheikhupura
- Khewra
- Karachi
- Hattar, Pakistan
