= Unlisted public company =

Public company that is not listed on any stock exchange

An unlisted public company, also known as an unquoted public company, is a public company that is not listed on any stock exchange. This enables it to raise finance by the issuing and sale of shares to the public, such as through advertising, but without listing on an exchange.

Though the criteria vary somewhat between jurisdictions, a public company is a company that is registered as such and generally has a minimum share capital and a minimum number of shareholders. Each stock exchange has its own listing requirements which a company (or other entity) wishing to be listed must meet. Besides not qualifying to be listed, a public company may choose not to be listed on a stock exchange for a number of reasons such as avoiding the costs associated with being listed, it does not seek public investors, or there are too few shareholders for a listing. There is a cost to the listed entities, in the listing process and ongoing costs as well as in compliance costs such as the maintenance of a company register.

In Australia, a public company, whether listed or not, is required to prepare an annual report that includes a directors' report, financial report, and an auditor's report. The report is to be distributed to shareholders 21 days before an annual general meeting or four months after the end of the financial year. These rules are in place because members of the public who have invested in such companies are not always in a position to get information about the companies' performance, and so would not be able to monitor their investment and determine the return on their investment.

In the United Kingdom the regulations regarding unquoted public companies, and how they differ from private companies and publicly listed companies, is outlined in the Companies Act 2006.

== See also ==
- Public company
- Privately held company

== Other sources ==
- Risks of investing in an unlisted company, Financial Express, 6 Nov 2005, access date 6 October 2010.
- What Are Unlisted Company Shares? Unlisted Network. Retrieved 2024-08-06.
