= LSE Group (Pakistan) =

- Native name: بورس لاہور
- Type: Public
- Traded as: PSX: LSECL; PSX: LSEFSL; PSX: LSEVL
- Industry: Finance
- Founded: 1970
- Headquarters: Lahore, Pakistan
- Website: lse.com.pk

LSE Group, formerly known as Lahore Stock Exchange is a Pakistani investment company based in Lahore, Pakistan. LSE Group consists of three companies: LSE Capital, LSE Financial Services, and LSE Ventures, all of them are listed on the Pakistan Stock Exchange.

== History ==
The Lahore Stock Exchange (LSE) was established in October 1970, under the Securities and Exchange Ordinance, 1969 by the Government of Pakistan in response to the needs for the provincial capital of Punjab. It initially had 83 companies listed and was headquartered at Bank Square in Lahore. The number of listed companies increased to 519 since its inception.

In 2000, LSE froze accounts following an unprecedented market crash, resulting in a two-day closure and a one-day trading suspension. The crisis allegedly began when LSE members working for investor Nisar Danka exceeded their exposure limits and failed to settle their clearings. Subsequently, Mian Nisar filed a damages suit under the Central Depository Act, 1979, against the LSE, Central Depository Company (CDC), and the Securities and Exchange Commission of Pakistan (SECP), claiming illegal sale of his shares by the LSE. On 18 December 2006, Justice Jawwad S. Khawaja, in a single bench decision, held the LSE and CDC liable for damages to Mian Nisar Elahi. In January 2007, a division bench of the Lahore High Court suspended the single bench's order, which had mandated the LSE and CDC to pay Rs500 million to Mian Nisar Elahi and other investors.

In 2014, the Federal Investigation Agency (FIA) uncovered an alleged illegal hundi and hawala operation run by dealers at the Lahore Stock Exchange. The FIA received information about an organized gang operating on the ground floor of the exchange and conducted a raid with the approval of the FIA Punjab Director. Three suspects were arrested during the raid: Syed Alamdar Hussain, Nadeem Khawar, and Sami Aslam. The FIA confiscated assets including prize bonds, cash in various currencies, and gold biscuits. They also seized hundi receipts, electronic devices, weapons, and ammunition. According to the seized records, approximately Rs24.75 billion had been transferred abroad through hawala transactions. The receipts only contained the names of the sender and receiver, along with the amounts involved, without proper documentation.

The Lahore Stock Exchange opened branches in the industrial cities of Faisalabad and Sialkot for trading. The Sialkot branch was referred to as the Sialkot Trading Floor.

With effect from 11 January 2016, the Lahore Stock Exchange was integrated with the Karachi Stock Exchange and Islamabad Stock Exchange under the Stock Exchanges (Corporatisation, Demutualization and Integration) Act, 2012 to form the Pakistan Stock Exchange.

== List of chairmen ==
- Noshir F. Dastoor

== LSE-25 ==
LSE-25: The Lahore Stock Exchange Twenty Five company index calculates the performance of stocks assuming that all rights issues and bonus share issues only increase the listed capital so that the prices of the shares are not adjusted as they are in the case of the LSETRI. The LSE25 also assumes that dividends paid out by a component company are not reinvested. In summary, in the LSE25, no price adjustments are made when any component company issues cash dividends.

== LSETRI ==
The Lahore Stock Exchange Total Return Index calculates the performance of stocks assuming that all payouts are reinvested in the index on the ex-date. The LSETRI assumes that if a component company issues bonus shares or announces a rights issue it will increase the listed capital. Additionally, the LSETRI also assumes that all pay-outs by a component company are 100% reinvested in the index. Therefore, the LSETRI is adjusted against such payouts announced by any of index constituents on its ex-date allowing the index value to remain comparable over time.

== See also ==
- List of Asian stock exchanges
