= Pakistan Stock Exchange =

Pakistan's primary securities trading marketplace

Pakistan Stock Exchange Limited
- Native name: بورس پاکستان محدود
- Formerly: Karachi Stock Exchange Limited
- Type: Stock exchange
- Traded as: PSX
- Founded: 18 September 1947 (as Karachi Stock Exchange)
- Headquarters: Karachi-74000, Pakistan
- Key people: Farrukh H. Sabzwari (CEO and Managing Director); Adnan Asad (Independent Director)
- Revenue: ▲ Rs. 3.114 billion (US$11 million) (2024)
- Net income: ▲ Rs. 1.11 billion (US$4.0 million) (2024)
- Total assets: ▲ Rs. 14.189 billion (US$51 million) (2024)
- Total equity: ▲ Rs. 11.439 billion (US$41 million) (2024)
- Owners: China Financial Futures Exchange (17%); Shanghai Stock Exchange (8%); Shenzhen Stock Exchange (5%); Pak China Investor Company (5%); Habib Bank Limited (5%)
- Number of employees: 223 (2024)
- Website: psx.com.pk dps.psx.com.pk
- Footnotes; Financials as of 31 December 2024

- Coordinates: 24°50′50.7″N 66°59′53.9″E
- Currency: Pakistani rupee (₨) (PKR)
- No. of listings: 561 (February 2026)
- Market cap: Rs. 18.8 trillion (US$67 billion) (February 2026)
- Indices: KSE 100 Index; KSE-30 Index; KSE ALL Index; KMI 30 Index; KMI ALL Index

The Pakistan Stock Exchange (PSX), founded as Karachi Stock Exchange (KSE) in 1947, is a stock exchange based in Karachi, Pakistan. In January 2016, the Karachi Stock Exchange merged with the Lahore Stock Exchange and Islamabad Stock Exchange to form the PSX, aiming to reduce market fragmentation and attract strategic investment partnerships.

As of February 2026, PSX lists 561 companies with a total market capitalization of approximately PKR 18.276 trillion (about $64.83 billion USD). The benchmark KSE 100 Index reached 156,181 Points, reflecting a 51.7% increase from the previous year. The exchange has 1,886 foreign institutional investors, 883 domestic institutional investors, around 220,000 retail investors, 400 brokerage houses, and 21 asset management companies.

The PSX was granted affiliate status by the World Federation of Exchanges (WFE) after it joined in June 2021, marking a significant milestone in its international recognition. PSX has been ranked by Bloomberg as one of the best-performing markets globally in 2023, 2024, and 2025.

== History ==
=== 1947–2016: Karachi Stock Exchange ===
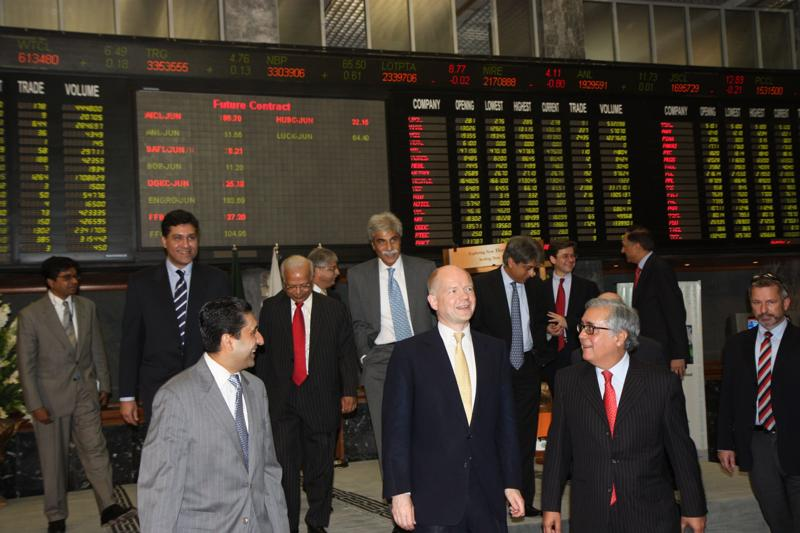
UK Foreign Secretary William Hague rings the closing bell at the Karachi Stock Exchange on 24 June 2010

The Karachi Stock Exchange (KSE) was founded on 18 September 1947, soon after Pakistan's independence. It was located in the Stock Exchange Building (SEB) on Stock Exchange Road, off I. I. Chundrigar Road (then McLeod Road), the heart of Karachi's financial district. Membership at the KSE was capped at 200, with each member holding a trading card. The value of these cards fluctuated sharply, climbing from just over one million rupees before 1990 to nearly 40 million rupees in the mid-1990s, before falling to around 27.5 million rupees by 2002.

Until 27 May 1998, trading at the KSE relied on the open outcry system, with buyers shouting "La-oo" and sellers responding "Lay." The influx of foreign investors during the early 1990s highlighted the need for modernization. With the support of a US$125 million loan from the Asian Development Bank for capital market reforms, the KSE introduced the Karachi Automated Trading System (KATS), replacing manual trading with electronic execution.

In 1999, the Securities and Exchange Commission of Pakistan (SECP) was created to regulate the country's capital markets. Khalid Mirza became its first chairman in March 2000. At that time, the KSE suffered from widespread market manipulation, poor governance, and weak investor protection. Despite a market capitalization of only US$6 billion, the exchange was prone to extreme volatility, with most activity concentrated in just 30 of its 765 listed companies. Malpractices included diversion of funds, absence of proper margin requirements, and predatory lending by brokers. Commercial banks often lent to brokers who engaged in "cornering," further disadvantaging small investors. Corporate governance was also weak: shareholder meetings were frequently delayed, and many firms opted to delist or liquidate assets, eroding investor confidence.

Mirza's reform agenda faced strong pushback from entrenched brokerage interests. Brokers staged demonstrations against SECP measures and accused him of being an "American agent." Although the SECP reduced broker dominance on the KSE's board of directors, they still controlled 60 percent of seats. The Commission also gained authority to regulate auditors, but penalties for misconduct remained low at only US$30 per offense. Transparency and accountability thus remained limited through the early 2000s.

On 14 December 1999, the SECP introduced the Companies (Buy-back of Shares) Rules, 1999, providing a legal framework for corporate share repurchases. In 2002, Alhamd Textile Mills became the first Pakistani company to buy back shares under the new rules.

=== 2016–present: Pakistan Stock Exchange ===
The Pakistan Stock Exchange (PSX) was established in January 2016 following the Government of Pakistan’s decision to merge the three main stock exchanges of Karachi, Lahore, and Islamabad into a single national bourse. A two-day mock trading session was conducted by the Karachi Stock Exchange before the official launch on 11 January 2016. The merger was intended to reduce market fragmentation, improve regulatory oversight, and strengthen the case for strategic partnerships to bring in technological expertise and international investors. It marked the second phase of the Stock Exchanges (Corporatisation, Demutualisation and Integration) Act, 2012, passed by a joint session of the Parliament of Pakistan.

In 2017, a consortium of Chinese exchanges including the Shanghai Stock Exchange, Shenzhen Stock Exchange, and the China Financial Futures Exchange acquired a 40% strategic stake in PSX, making China its single largest foreign shareholder. Through this partnership, PSX was linked with Chinese capital markets under the "China Connect" system, enabling greater cross-border investment flows.

On 29 June 2020, Balochistan Liberation Army (BLA) militants attacked the PSX building, resulting in eight people killed and seven others injured.

By December 2024, the exchange had 525 listed companies with a combined market capitalization of approximately PKR 14.5 trillion. By February 2026, listings had grown to 561 companies and combined market capitalization to about PKR 18.28 trillion. The exchange operates several key indices, including the KSE 100 Index, KSE-30 Index, and KMI 30 Index, which are widely used benchmarks for market performance in Pakistan. Net number of companies do vary after excluding the list of companies which are non-compliant or de-listed.

== Market structure and operations ==
The Pakistan Stock Exchange operates as a demutualised entity under the Stock Exchanges (Corporatisation, Demutualisation and Integration) Act, 2012. Its ownership is divided between shareholders, brokers, and strategic investors, with the Securities and Exchange Commission of Pakistan (SECP) acting as the primary regulator.

PSX offers trading across multiple asset classes, including equities, corporate debt instruments, government securities, exchange-traded funds (ETFs), futures, and derivatives. Trading is conducted electronically through the Karachi Automated Trading System (KATS), which provides nationwide connectivity.

Clearing, settlement, and custodial services are provided through the Central Depository Company of Pakistan (CDC) and the National Clearing Company of Pakistan (NCCPL). Settlement typically takes place on a T+1 basis, which was adopted on 9 February 2026 to align with international standards.

PSX's benchmark indices include:

- The KSE 100 Index, a capitalization-weighted index of 100 representative companies.
- The KSE-30 Index, tracking 30 most liquid stocks.
- The KMI 30 Index, an Islamic Sharia-compliant index of 30 firms.
- The All Shares Index, covering the full listed market.

Trading hours are Monday to Friday, with pre-open, regular, and post-close sessions. The exchange has also adopted circuit breakers and volatility controls in line with international best practices.

=== Regulation and oversight ===
The Pakistan Stock Exchange is regulated by the Securities and Exchange Commission of Pakistan (SECP), which supervises capital markets and protects investors. The State Bank of Pakistan oversees financial stability and regulates banks involved in capital market activities.

PSX was demutualized under the Stock Exchanges (Corporatization, Demutualization and Integration) Act, 2012, transforming it into a for-profit company with separated ownership and management. The exchange operates a surveillance department to monitor trading, detect market manipulation, and enforce corporate governance. It also follows international standards through membership in the World Federation of Exchanges and alignment with International Organization of Securities Commissions principles.

== Associate companies ==
Notable companies in which PSX owns controlling or significant minority stakes include:

- National Clearing Company of Pakistan (49.71%)
- Central Depository Company (39.81%)
- Pakistan Mercantile Exchange (28.41%)
- E-Clear (25%)
- VIS Credit Rating (12.50%)
