= Fuel extraction in Pakistan =

As per BP' Statistical Review of World Energy 2016, at the end of 2015 Pakistan had the following proved reserves of fuels: 0.5 Trillion cu m of natural gas and 2.07 Billion tons of coal (sub-bituminous and lignite).

== Oil industry ==
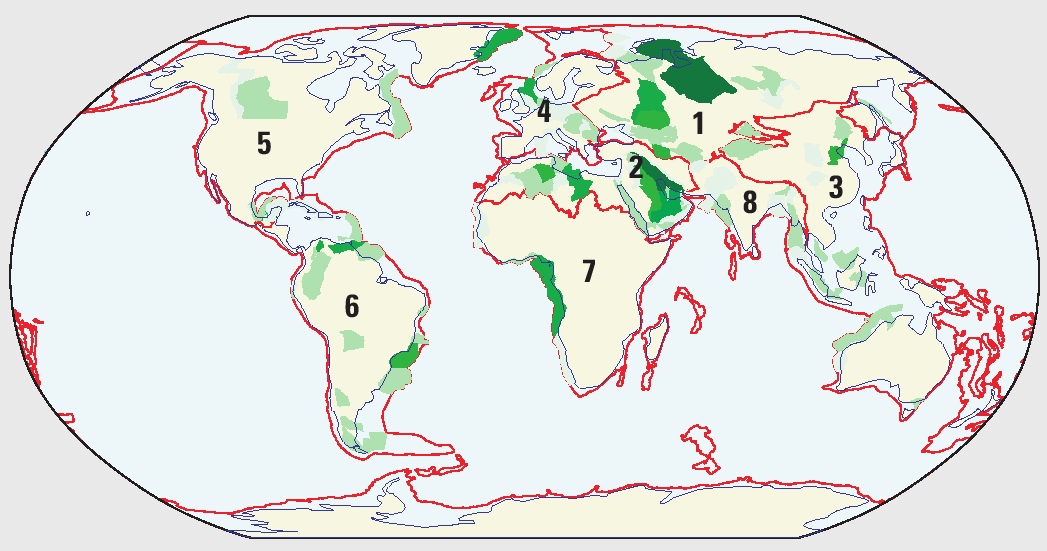
A USGS map of countries where oil is located.

=== Discovery ===
Pakistan's first gas field was found in late 1952 in Balochistan near the giant Sui gas field. The Toot oilfield was not discovered until the early 1960s in the Punjab. It covers 122.67 square kilometres (47.36 sq mi). Pakistan Petroleum and Pakistan Oilfields explored and began drilling these fields with Soviet help in 1961 and activity began in the Toot oilfield during 1964.

On January 21, 2026, OGDCL announced its latest oil and gas discovery in its Baragzai X-01 exploratory well in the Nashpa Block of Kohat district, Khyber Pakhtunkhwa. the company will be producing about 3,100 barrels of crude oil and 8.15 million cubic feet of natural gas per day. This is the third discovery the company has made at this site within a month. It will add around 14.5 % to the country’s domestic crude output, helping reduce reliance on costly energy imports.

=== History ===
The Toot area is one of the oldest oil producing regions in Pakistan with the first oil well drilled in 1964 when President Ayub Khan encouraged a mineral development policy. It is located in the Khaur, Punjab Province, which is located approximately 135 km southwest of the capital city of Islamabad. In 1964 the first well was drilled and commercial production started in 1967. There are about 60 million barrels of oil in place of which 12%-15% is recoverable. At its peak during 1986, the field was producing approximately 2,400 barrel of oil per day. It has grown steadily since then, producing both oil and, to a lesser degree, natural gas. Oil production was entirely confined to the Potwar Plateau till 1981, when Union Texas Pakistan subsidiary discovered its first oil-field in Lower Sindh. By 1998-1999, the Lower Sindh gas-fields were producing more oil than the Potohar Plateau. Since then, new deposits have also been found here.

=== Modern exploration ===
In 2005, the Vancouver-based 'International Sovereign Energy' signed a memorandum of understanding with the Oil & Gas Development Company, Pakistan's national oil company, to develop the Toot field. Schlumberger Oilfield Services first started operations in early 2006. After favorable results, the Vancouver-based 'Junior oil' and International 'Sovereign Energy Corp'. Oil and gas exploration companies signed a memorandum of agreement with the Oil & Gas Development Company, Pakistan's national oil company, in mid-2005, to develop the Toot oil field in Punjab Province, near the capital city of Islamabad. The company is also providing electricity to locals living around the residential camps of Toot oil field and the neighbouring Missa Keswaal oil field.

=== Petroleum refining ===
The crude oil that is produced in Pakistan gets refined at home at five oil refineries which are Cnergyico Pk Limited, Pak-Arab Refinery Company Limited (PARCO), Pakistan Refinery Limited, Attock Refinery Limited, and National Refinery Limited. The combined processing capacity of these five refineries is roughly 420,000 barrels per day. Cnergyico Pk Limited is Pakistan's largest oil refiner with installed processing capacity of 156,000 barrels per day, accounting for around 37% of Pakistan's total oil refining capacity.

In 2019, it was announced that Saudi Aramco will establish an oil refinery in Gwadar.

== Natural gas industry ==
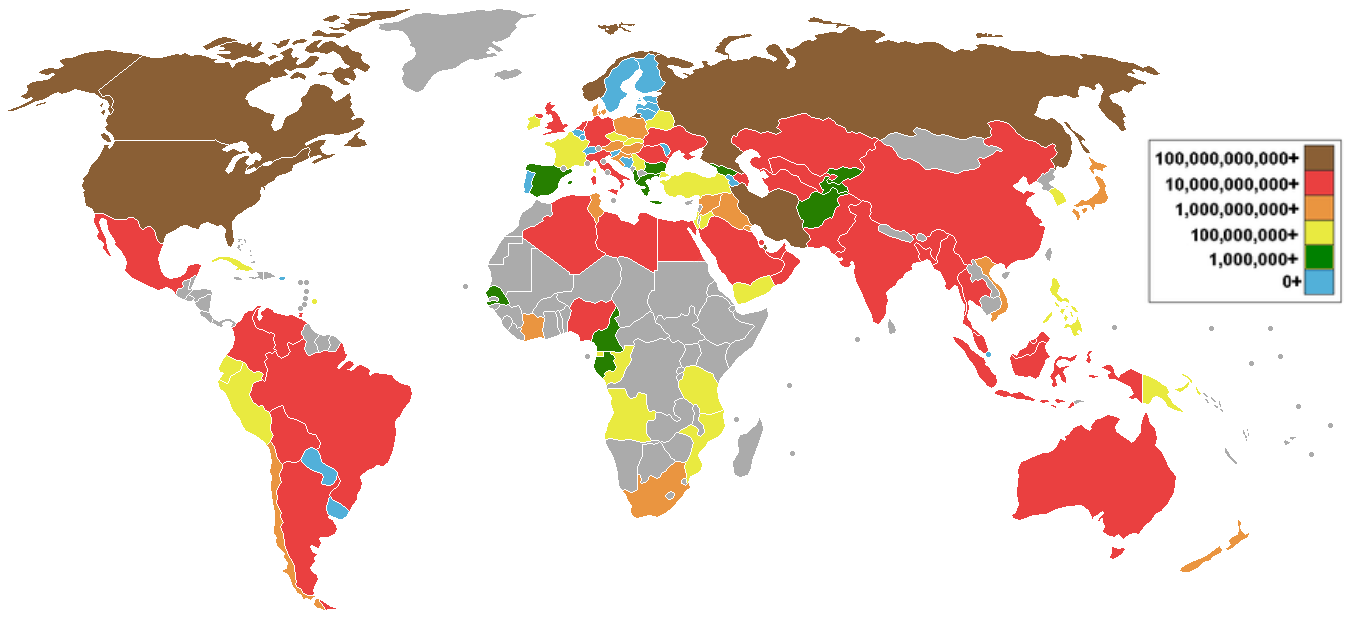
Countries where natural gas fields are located

Natural gas production is at a relatively high level and remaining reserves are estimated to be about 885.3 billion cu m (1 January 2009 est.). Pakistan's gas fields are only expected to last for about another 20 years at the most due to heavy industrial usage.

The Largest Gas Producing province of Pakistan is Baluchistan.

The Sui gas field is the biggest natural gas field in Pakistan. It is near Sui in Balochistan. The gas field was discovered in the late 1952 and the commercial exploitation of the field began in 1955. Sui gas field accounts for 6% of Pakistan's gas production. Remaining reserves are estimated to be at about 800 billion cubic feet (tcf) and the daily production is around 14,000,000 cubic metres (500×10^{6} cu ft) of natural. The operator of the field is Pakistan Petroleum Limited.

== Coal industry ==
=== History ===
Coal was first discovered across Pakistan and the rest of South Asia in the 1880s and was used by the British-owned railway companies under colonial rule. Later, post-colonial Pakistan had used coal to fuel its industry from independence to the discovery of the Baluchistan's Sui gas field in 1952 and the Toot oilfield in 1964.

Environmentalists are now concerned that Pakistan has recently discovered one low and four low to medium-quality coal seams in the Punjab and plans to re-fuel its economically important cement industry with it after their oil fields have run dry. Low-sulfur coal was recently reported to have been found at the Baluchistan near Quetta as well. There are reports that low a sulfur deposit has been found near Islamabad.

Sindh's Thar Desert lignite mines will also be expanded soon for industrial usage too. This Thar's mine is open-cut mine. These mines are relatively safer to mine from. While Baluchistan's mines are underground mines, these are dangerous to mine from.

Pakistan Baluchistan's mines have seen several accidents over the years among which the one which happened in 2011 was with the greatest number of casualties. According to one news paper the death toll rose up to 45, though majority agree upon that it ranged from 40 to 45 people.

Special measures are being employed to reduce the resulting fly ash, carbon footprint and sulphur fume emission problems after it is burnt.

=== Types of coal found ===
Bituminous coal is a relatively hard and less sulfurous coal containing a tar-like substance called bitumen and would be burnt largely on domestic fires after being turned into coke fuel.

Sub-bituminous coal is a coal whose properties range from those of lignite to those of bituminous coal and is used primarily as fuel for steam-electric power generation. It is set to fuel power stations and cement works in Pakistan.

Lignite is a low-grade, sulfurous coal that is generally used in modified industrial furnaces to generate heat for boilers, coke oven heaters, brick kilns, etc. However it can be converted to a substitute for crude oil through the Fischer Tropsch technology. There are discussions on setting up a plant with Shenhua Ningxia Coal of China.

=== Workings ===
Musakhel Balochistan (Kingri-Aram-Safa Coal fields)

- Location- 175 km from Multan and 290 km from Quetta
- Types of Coal- Sub-bituminous to Bituminous and Lignite
- Total Coal Reserves- 17.5 Millions
- Production- 56,009 Tons

Lakhara

- Location-176 km north of Karachi, 65 km northwest of Hyderabad
- Type of Coal-Sub-bituminous to lignite
- Total coal resources- 38.82 million tons
- Production- (2003–04) 217,967 tons

Dengari

- Location- 35 km south-east of Quetta
- Type of Coal- Sub-bituminous-A to high volatile B-bituminous
- Total coal resources- 15.42 million tonnes
- Production- (2003–04) 15,043 tons

Sor-range

- Location - 16 km east of Quetta
- Type of Coal- Sub-bituminous-A to high volatile B-bituminous
- Total coal resources- 12.95 million tonnes
- Production- (2003–04) 56,132 tons

Nowshera (Shaidu, Khawrai, Pethawo area)

- oil and gas resources available

Shahrig

- Coal field location- 160 km north-east of Quetta
- Type of Coal- Sub Bituminous B to heavy volatile Bituminous-A
- Total coal resources- 28.97 million tonnes
- Production- (2003–04) 94,583 tons

Sonda

- Coal field location- Near to Quetta
- Type of Coal- Sub Bituminous B to heavy volatile Bituminous-A
- Total coal resources- N/A.
- Production- (2003–04) N/A.

== Lignite industry ==
=== Production ===
Sindh's Thar Desert and lignite mines in Kingri Balochistan will also be expanded soon for industrial usage. Special measures are being employed to reduce the resulting fly ash, carbon footprint and sulphur fume emission problems after it is burnt. However it can be converted to a substitute for crude oil through the Fischer Tropsch technology. There are discussions on setting up a plant with Shenhua Group of China.

The Lignite/ Brown Coal of Kingri Coal fields in percentage from 44 - 79 % use in formation of Humic Acid. Usage is in high quantity. Lignite can also be a source of fertilizer and soil conditioner.

=== Usage ===
Lignite is a low grade, sulphurous coal that is generally used in modified industrial furnaces to generate heat for boilers, coke oven heaters, brick kilns, etc. However it can be converted to a substitute for crude oil through the Fischer Tropsch technology. There are discussions on setting up a plant with Shenhua Group of China.

Nowadays lignite use in Humic Acid formation from last three years especially of Kingri Area of Balochistan

== Uranium production ==
=== History ===
Pakistan has had a long history of exporting small amounts of uranium to the West. The Tumman Leghari mine in South Punjab, Baghalchur mine, Dera Ghazi Khan mine and Issa Khel / Kubul Kel mines in Mianwali District. Pakistan has recently used some in its own nuclear power and weapons programs.

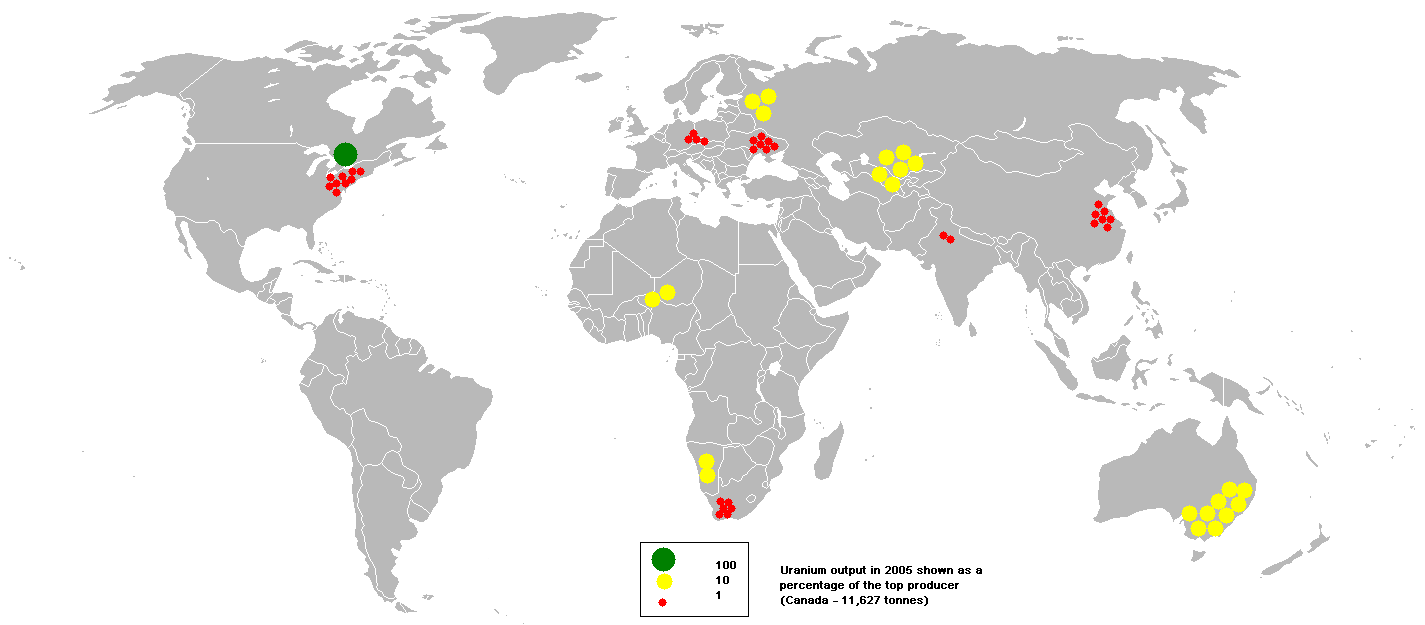
World uranium output in 2005.

=== Mines ===
The Wahi Pandi, Karunuk (Sehwan), and Rehman Dhora (Aamri) mines in the Kirthar Range, Sindh and the Shanawah Deposit, Karak in Khyber Pakhtunkhwa province are being opened up to meet Pakistan's rising need for uranium, which these sources are issuing at an ore grade: 0.04% Uranium mineral purity rate. The Baghalchur site has several abandoned mines and is now being used as an industrial dumping ground.

Baghalchur is a town in Dera Ghazi Khan District, Punjab, Pakistan. Baghalchur is the site of abandoned Uranium mines now being used as a nuclear dump. The residents of the area along with several Pakistani environmentalist groups are opposed to the nuclear dump being used by Pakistan Atomic Energy Commission (PAEC), and have asked the government to invest in better techniques in the disposal of nuclear waste materials.

=== Output ===
Pakistan produced about 45 tonnes of uranium in 2006.

== See also ==
- Cnergyico Pk Limited
- Attock Group of Companies
- Oil industry
- Iran–Pakistan–India gas pipeline
