= Petroleum industry in Pakistan =

According to the United States Energy Information Administration (EIA), Pakistan may have over 9 billion barrels (1.4×10^{9} cubic metres) of petroleum oil and 105 trillion cubic feet (3.0 trillion cubic metres) in natural gas (including shale gas) reserves.

As per BP' Statistical Review of World Energy 2016, at the end of 2015 Pakistan had the following proved reserves of fuels: 0.9 Trillion cu m of natural gas and 2.07 Billion tons of coal (sub-bituminous and lignite).

== Oil industry ==
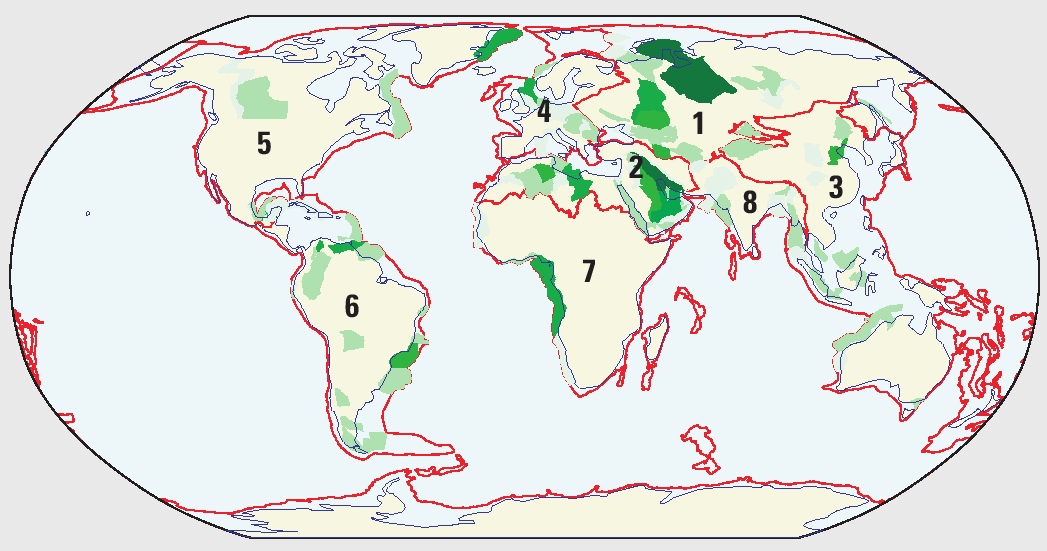
A USGS map of countries where oil is located.

=== Discovery ===
Pakistan's first gas field was found in the late 1952 in Balochistan near a giant Sui gas field. The Toot oil field was not discovered until the early 1960s in the Punjab. The Most Rich resource in Khaur Company (Attock). It covers 122.67 square kilometres (47.36 sq mi). Pakistan Petroleum and Pakistan Oilfields explored and began drilling these field with Soviet help in 1961 and activity began in Toot during 1964.

=== History ===
The Toot area is one of the oldest oil producing regions in Pakistan with the first oilwell drilled in 1964 when President Ayub Khan encouraged a mineral development policy. It is located in Punjab Province, which area is located approximately 135 km southwest of the capital city of Islamabad. In 1964 the first well was drilled and commercial production started in 1967. There are about 60 million barrels of oil in place of which 12%-15% is recoverable. At its peak during 1986, the field was producing approximately 2,400 barrel of oil per day. It has grown steadily since then, producing both oil and, to a lesser degree, natural gas. Oil production was entirely confined to the Punjab till 1981, when Union Texas Pakistan discovered its first oil-field in Lower Sindh. By 1998-1999, the Lower Sindh gas-fields were producing more oil than the Punjab. Since then, new deposits have also been found here. The Ratana Field was in Punjab discovered in 1992 and drilling began in 1993, with a new well (Ratana-5A) opening in 2024.

=== Modern exploration ===
In 2005, the Vancouver-based 'International Sovereign Energy' signed a memorandum of understanding with the Oil & Gas Development Company, Pakistan's national oil company, to develop the Toot field. Schlumberger Oilfield Services first started operations in early 2006. After favorable results, the Vancouver based 'Junior oil' and International 'Sovereign Energy Corp'. Oil and gas exploration companies signed a memorandum of agreement with the Oil & Gas Development Company, Pakistan's national oil company, in mid-2005, to develop the Toot field in Punjab Province, near the capital city of Islamabad. The company is also providing electricity to locals living around the residential camps of Toot oil field and the neighbouring Missa Keswaal oil field.

=== Oil refining industry ===
There are five main oil refineries in Pakistan with a combined capacity of approximately 450,000 barrels of crude oil per day (bpd), equivalent to 20 million tonnes per annum. Cnergyico is the largest oil refiner, with its oil refining complex in the Balochistan province able to refine up to 156,000 barrels per day of crude oil. The country's five oil refineries process crude oil produced in Pakistan and from other countries to produce refined petroleum products such as High Speed Diesel (HSD), Motor Gasoline (MS), Furnace Oil (FO), Light Diesel Oil (LDO), High-Octane Blending Component (HOBC), Jet fuel (JP-1&JP-8), Kerosene, Liquefied Petroleum Gas (LPG), and Naphtha. The domestic oil refining industry typically meets 60% of Pakistan's diesel, 30% of motor gasoline, and 100% of jet fuel demand. The jet fuel is primarily used for defence purposes.

Sindh is a rich province in natural resources of gas, petrol, and coal. The Mari Gas field is the biggest producer of natural gas in the country, with companies like Pakistan Petroleum, Pakistan State Oil, Oil & Gas Development Company, Mari Petroleum. Thar coalfield also includes a large lignite deposit.

On January 21, 2026, the Oil & Gas Development Company announced its latest oil and gas discovery in its Baragzai X-01 exploratory well in the Nashpa Block of Kohat district, Khyber Pakhtunkhwa. the company will be producing about 3,100 barrels of crude oil and 8.15 million cubic feet of natural gas per day. This is the third discovery the company has made at this site within a month. It will add around 14.5 % to the country's domestic crude output, helping reduce reliance on costly energy imports.

== Natural gas industry ==
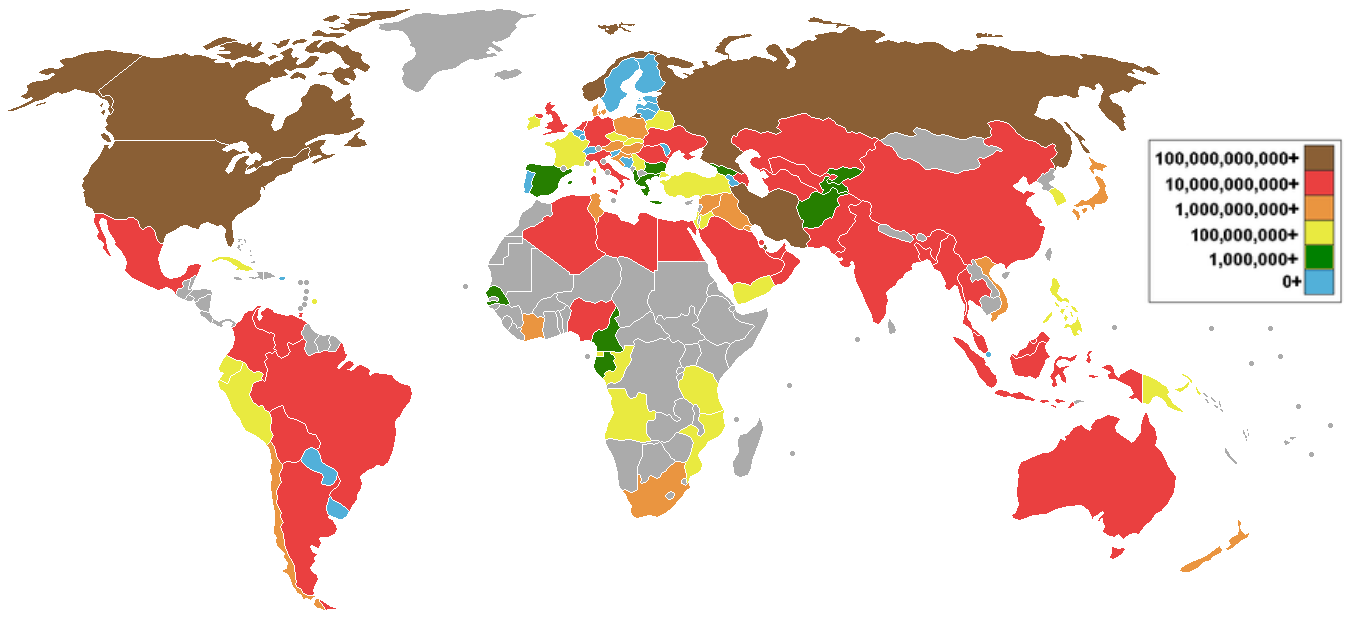
Countries where natural gas fields are located

Natural gas production is at a relatively high level and remaining reserves are estimated to be about 885.3 billion cu m (1 January 2009 est.). Pakistan's gas fields are only expected to last for about another 20 years at the most due to heavy industrial usage.

The Sui gas field is the biggest natural gas field in Pakistan. It is located near Sui in Balochistan. The gas field was discovered in the late 1952 and the commercial exploitation of the field began in 1955. Sui gas field accounts for 6% of Pakistan's gas production. Remaining reserves are estimated to be at about 800 billion cubic feet (tcf) and the daily production is around 500 million cubic feet (14,000,000 m^{3}) of natural. The operator of the field is Pakistan Petroleum.

== See also ==
- Cnergyico
- Attock Group of Companies
- Oil industry
- Iran–Pakistan–India gas pipeline
