= Interstate Gas Systems Private Limited =

Pakistani natural gas infrastructure company

Inter State Gas Systems (Private) Limited
- Type: Private limited company
- Industry: Energy
- Founded: August 4, 1996
- Headquarters: Petroleum House, Atatürk Avenue, Islamabad, Pakistan
- Area served: Pakistan
- Products: Natural gas infrastructure and pipeline projects
- Owner: Government Holdings (Private) Limited
- Parent: Government Holdings (Private) Limited
- Website: www.isgs.com.pk

Inter State Gas Systems (Private) Limited (ISGS) is a Pakistani state-owned natural gas infrastructure company headquartered in Islamabad, Pakistan. It was incorporated on 4 August 1996 as a private limited company under the Companies Ordinance, 1984. The company is a wholly owned subsidiary of Government Holdings (Private) Limited (GHPL) and operates under the auspices of the Petroleum Division of the Ministry of Energy, Government of Pakistan.

The company is mandated to identify and develop natural gas import opportunities and coordinate the development of cross-border gas pipeline infrastructure in Pakistan. Its major projects include the Iran–Pakistan gas pipeline, the Turkmenistan–Afghanistan–Pakistan–India (TAPI) gas pipeline, the Pakistan Stream Gas Pipeline and the Strategic Underground Gas Storage project.

== History ==
Inter State Gas Systems was established in 1996 following the Government of Pakistan's efforts to develop infrastructure for importing natural gas from neighbouring countries. Initially, the company was jointly owned by two state-owned gas utilities: Sui Southern Gas Company Limited (SSGC), which held 51 percent of its shares, and Sui Northern Gas Pipelines Limited (SNGPL), which held 49 percent.

The company was established to coordinate international natural gas import projects, particularly the Iran–Pakistan and TAPI pipeline projects. Government Holdings (Private) Limited subsequently acquired the company's shares, making ISGS its wholly owned subsidiary.

== Operations ==
ISGS is involved in the development and coordination of natural gas import infrastructure and cross-border pipeline projects. Its responsibilities include identifying gas import opportunities, coordinating with national and international stakeholders, and supporting the development of natural gas transportation infrastructure.

According to its financial statements for the financial year 2022–23, the company's principal projects included the Iran–Pakistan pipeline, TAPI, Pakistan Stream Gas Pipeline and Strategic Underground Gas Storage projects.

== Major projects ==
=== Iran–Pakistan gas pipeline ===
The Iran–Pakistan gas pipeline is a proposed natural gas pipeline project intended to transport natural gas from Iran to Pakistan. ISGS has been involved in the development and implementation of the Pakistani section of the project. An environmental and social impact assessment report for the project was prepared in 2012.

=== Turkmenistan–Afghanistan–Pakistan–India pipeline ===
The Turkmenistan–Afghanistan–Pakistan–India (TAPI) pipeline is a proposed natural gas pipeline intended to transport gas from Turkmenistan's Galkynysh gas field through Afghanistan and Pakistan to India. ISGS represents Pakistan's interests in the development and coordination of the project.

=== Pakistan Stream Gas Pipeline ===
The Pakistan Stream Gas Pipeline (PSGP), formerly known as the North–South Gas Pipeline, is a proposed gas transportation project intended to improve the capacity of Pakistan's natural gas transmission infrastructure. ISGS is associated with the project's development.

=== Strategic Underground Gas Storage ===
The Strategic Underground Gas Storage (SUGS) project aims to develop underground facilities for storing natural gas in Pakistan. The project is among the infrastructure initiatives being pursued by ISGS.

== Corporate affairs ==
=== Ownership and governance ===
ISGS is a wholly owned subsidiary of Government Holdings (Private) Limited. The company operates under the Petroleum Division of Pakistan's Ministry of Energy and has a board of directors responsible for its corporate governance.

=== Headquarters ===
The company's registered office is located at Petroleum House, Atatürk Avenue, Islamabad, Pakistan.

== See also ==
- Energy in Pakistan
- Iran–Pakistan gas pipeline
- Turkmenistan–Afghanistan–Pakistan–India Pipeline
- Government Holdings (Private) Limited
- Sui Southern Gas Company
- Sui Northern Gas Pipelines Limited
