= Sui Gas Pipeline =

Sui Gas Pipeline in Pakistan may refer to:

- Sui Northern Gas Pipelines Limited
- Sui Southern Gas Company

== See also ==
- Sui gas field
- Sui, Balochistan
- Military College Sui
- Sui Airport
