= India–United States diplomatic and trade crisis =

The 2025–26 United States–India diplomatic and trade crisis started in August 2025, when U.S.–India relations entered a period of acute tension following a sharp escalation in trade and diplomatic disputes. The Trump administration imposed sweeping tariffs on Indian exports—initially a 25 percent "reciprocal" tariff, followed by an additional 25 percent penalty tied to India's continued imports of Russian oil—bringing the total duty to a staggering 50 percent, among the highest imposed on any trading partner. India strongly denounced the measures as "unfair, unjustified and unreasonable," asserting that its energy policy and supply chains are independent and grounded in its strategic autonomy. The crisis deepened when reports emerged suggesting India had paused major defense procurements from the U.S., though the Indian Defence Ministry swiftly denied these claims as "false and fabricated," emphasizing that existing acquisition processes remain on track. The standoff has raised broader concerns about the future of strategic cooperation, with experts warning that the fallout could unsettle mutual trust, complicate defense ties, and undermine joint regional initiatives, including the Quad.

== Background ==
The U.S.–India relationship has been strengthening over decades, underpinned by shared strategic interests, including cooperation in the Quadrilateral Security Dialogue (Quad) aimed at counterbalancing China's regional influence.

India's longstanding policy of strategic autonomy saw it deepen ties with Russia and BRICS, even amid Western pressure, which generated friction.

In February 2025, Prime Minister Narendra Modi visited the U.S., aiming to boost trade, agreeing on "Mission 500" to reach $500 billion in trade by 2030, and discussing defense and energy cooperation.

In mid-June 2025, following the G7 Summit in Canada, U.S. President Donald Trump invited Prime Minister Narendra Modi to make a stopover in the United States-specifically a dinner in Washington—on his return journey. Modi declined, citing "pre-existing commitments" and signaling that his priority was to proceed to Odisha, which he referred to as the "land of Lord Jagannath" (or the "land of Mahaprabhu"). During the same phone call, Modi extended an invitation to Trump to visit India for the Quad Summit, an offer that Trump accepted.

== Triggering events ==
=== Operation Sindoor and acknowledgment controversy ===
After the Pahalgam attack and the subsequent 2025 India-Pakistan conflict, a ceasefire was reached in May after four days of skirmishes. President Trump publicly claimed he mediated it, but India swiftly rejected this, asserting no U.S. role in the military negotiations. According to the American multinational investment bank Jefferies Group, the subsequent unusually high level of tariffs was primarily a result of Trump's personal dissatisfaction following India's rejection of his offer to mediate during tensions with Pakistan. This refusal was perceived as a missed opportunity for Trump to present himself as a peace broker and potentially bolster his prospects for a Nobel Peace Prize. John Bolton later described the tariffs and Trump taking credit for "bringing peace to India and Pakistan" after the terrorist attack in Kashmir as "inappropriate."

=== Tariffs and economic retaliation ===
Frustrated by India's continued Russian oil imports and its BRICS participation, the Trump administration first imposed a 25% tariff on Indian goods on 1 August, later doubling it to 50% effective 27 August 2025. Additional threats of secondary sanctions were announced. India's foreign ministry had earlier said that the country was being unfairly criticized for buying Russian oil, while the United States and the European Union continued to buy goods from Russia.

== Impacts and reactions ==
=== Official response from India ===
On 4 August 2025, the Indian Ministry of External Affairs criticized the U.S. tariffs as unjustified and unreasonable, stating that India's imports of Russian oil were a necessary measure to ensure affordable energy for its 1.4 billion citizens amid global supply disruptions. The Ministry pointed out that, unlike India, the United States and the European Union maintained substantial trade with Russia without similar strategic necessity. The U.S. had continued imports of Russian uranium, palladium, and fertilizers. Indian officials have also expressed concern over the perceived shift in U.S. policy, noting that senior American officials had earlier supported India's Russian oil purchases. In November 2022, Treasury Secretary Janet Yellen indicated the U.S. had no objection to India buying Russian oil outside the G7 price cap if Western services were not used. In February 2024, Assistant Secretary of State Geoffrey Pyatt acknowledged India's role in stabilizing global energy markets, and later that year, Ambassador Eric Garcetti described India's imports as aligned with U.S. policy objectives, calling them a “smaller victory” for Washington.

In his first public comments since the US imposed a hefty 50% tariff on Indian goods, India's commerce minister said that India would not "bow down" to the United States and would instead focus on attracting new markets.

=== Indian economic and industrial fallout ===
Tariffs jeopardize up to 70% of India's exports to the U.S., prompting warnings from the Indian Council for Research on International Economic Relations (ICRIER) to diversify and pursue trade reform.

U.S. tariffs have disrupted corporate strategies aimed at relocating supply chains to India, stalling investments by firms such as Posha and Cradlewise.

=== Political strain and criticism ===
Former diplomat Vikas Swarup attributed the U.S. aggression not just to trade disputes but also India's BRICS involvement and refusal to credit Trump for peace progress.

Financial Times commentary framed the episode as echoing the post-1998 nuclear-test era—reflecting personalization of diplomacy, rising trade friction, and strategic divergence.

Analysts, including Michael Kugelman, labeled the situation as the "worst crisis in two decades" of U.S.–India relations. While daunting, they cautioned that the depth of bilateral ties offers resilience.

Journalist Fareed Zakaria and former U.S. Ambassador to India Kenneth I. Juster have both described President Donald Trump's imposition of steep tariffs on India as a significant setback in U.S.-India relations. Zakaria characterized the move as reversing decades of bipartisan efforts to strengthen ties with New Delhi, noting that India was placed in the highest tariff category alongside countries like Syria and Myanmar, while Pakistan received lower tariffs despite its close ties with China. He warned that such actions risk pushing India closer to Russia and China, and quoted Trump referring to India's economy as “dead.” Juster echoed concerns over the diplomatic fallout, noting surprise and indignation in India, especially after Trump labeled Indian tariffs “obnoxious” and claimed to have brokered an India-Pakistan ceasefire—a claim publicly rejected by New Delhi. He also highlighted that while the tariffs affect around 20 percent of India's exports to the U.S., they would also raise costs for American companies and consumers by increasing prices and reducing choices in key sectors such as textiles, auto parts, and gems and jewelry. Nikki Haley also argued that strengthening U.S.-India relations was essential to countering China's influence and maintaining regional stability. She emphasized the need for high-level diplomacy to resolve tensions and preserve the strategic partnership. She wrote that if such unequal treatment doesn't prompt a reassessment of U.S.-India relations, then strategic realities should—warning that undoing 25 years of progress with the only viable counterbalance to China in Asia would be a major "strategic disaster."

In August 2025, U.S. House Foreign Affairs Committee Democrats criticized President Trump's 50% tariffs on India, saying the move would hurt Americans and "sabotage" the U.S.-India relationship while doing little to address the Ukraine war. They questioned why India was targeted instead of China, a larger purchaser of Russian oil. The committee had earlier stated that if Trump were serious about ending the conflict, he would have supported Ukraine militarily instead of pressuring it to accept Putin's terms.

Georg Enzweiler, chargé d'affaires at the German Embassy in New Delhi, stated that the European Union consistently supports reducing tariffs to a minimum, viewing them as obstacles to free trade regardless of their origin. He made these remarks at the Indo-German Chamber of Commerce Industry Dialogue.

Rick Sanchez suggested that Trump's high tariffs on Indian imports were driven by "vendettas, grudges, and non-scientific thinking." He described the secondary tariffs as "extremely preposterous" and characterized the overall policy toward India as "disrespectful and ignorant," arguing it ignored India's strategic autonomy and global significance.

Jeffrey Sachs criticized the Trump's tariffs, calling them a strategic error that would hurt the United States more than India. He stated the move could isolate the U.S., reduce its global competitiveness, and strain relations with India by driving it closer to the BRICS group. Sachs argued the tariffs lacked meaningful negotiating impact casting doubt on the U.S. as a dependable long-term partner.

In September 2025, Jake Sullivan criticized President Trump for weakening India-U.S. relations, attributing the shift to the Trump family's business interests in Pakistan. In an interview, Sullivan cited the April 2025 agreements between the Trump-backed crypto platform World Liberty Financial and the Pakistan Crypto Council as an example of personal business influencing foreign policy. He described the sidelining of India as a "huge strategic harm" and warned that it undermines global confidence in U.S. commitments and alliances.

John Bolton criticized Trump's decision to impose tariffs, calling the move "inappropriate" and a sign of "erratic behaviour." He questioned why similar penalties were not applied to other major buyers like China, Turkey, and Pakistan, suggesting the approach was more theatrical than strategic. According to Bolton, the tariffs did not reflect standard trade policy and were part of Trump's unconventional handling of international relations.

U.S. Representative Sydney Kamlager-Dove said Trump's policies were self-defeating and "would come at a cost," arguing that his coercive approach risked pushing key American partners toward adversaries. She pointed to a Modi-Putin selfie as evidence and urged swift action to repair the U.S.–India relationship.

=== Domestic Indian responses ===
In Punjab, farming groups organized protests, burning effigies of President Trump and criticizing what they saw as hypocrisy in Western trade policies.

Political opponents used the narrative of “Narendra Surrender” to accuse Modi of capitulating to U.S. pressure. The leader, however, maintained a steadfast defense of domestic interests.

=== Defense procurement and Quad implications ===
In response, India reportedly paused major U.S. defense deals (estimated at $3.6 billion), including Stryker vehicles and Boeing aircraft, though the government later denied halting any plans.

The rising tensions cast doubt on the upcoming Quad leaders’ summit, with New Delhi delaying confirmation of dates. This risked undermining multilateral coordination in the Indo-Pacific.

Australian Foreign Minister Penny Wong, responding to questions about U.S. tariffs on Indian goods, stated that Australia does not support tariffs and continues to believe in open trade as the foundation of economic growth. While refraining from commenting directly on U.S.-India relations, she emphasized Australia's commitment to a strong partnership with India, support for the Quad, and the importance of dialogue and shared strategic objectives in the Indo-Pacific region.

== Strategic interpretations ==
Experts noted Trump's "America First" approach prioritized trade over strategic alliance-building, particularly in contrast to the earlier administrations. India's multipolar alignments—balancing ties with the West, China, and Russia—were seen as both strategic pragmatism and a point of U.S. concern.

Krystle Kaul, U.S. advisor to North Atlantic Treaty Organization (NATO), stated that the new U.S. tariffs on Indian imports would significantly damage the U.S.-India relationship, which had been strengthened over decades of bipartisan effort. She described the move as a unilateral directive by President Trump, not reflective of broader U.S. or democratic sentiment, and warned that the tariffs could harm key Indian export sectors and take years to repair the diplomatic fallout.

Amid heightened trade tensions, analysts noted that Modi adopted a firm stance in response to punitive tariffs imposed by Trump, maintaining India's strategic autonomy and protecting key economic interests. Despite the imposition of a 50% tariff on select Indian exports, including jewelry, shrimp, and textiles. The Indian government refrained from making concessions, instead signaling India's intent to diversify partnerships by engaging with leaders such as President of Russia Vladimir Putin and General Secretary of the Chinese Communist Party Xi Jinping, and by pursuing closer trade ties with the European Union. The dispute initially strained bilateral relations, but the resumption of negotiations in September 2025 indicated that India's consistent approach may have influenced the course of talks, positioning it as a more assertive actor in global trade dynamics.

== Current status and outlook ==
As of mid-August 2025, tariffs stand at 50%, with no formal resolution in sight. Domestic pressure and economic strain continue to mount.

Analysts emphasize the relationship's complexity and the possibility for recalibration, albeit with diminished trust.

The standoff may reshape India's foreign policy orientation, potentially reinforcing ties with Russia, China, or other groupings beyond the Western sphere. However, India's exports to the US rebounded to $6.92 billion in November 2025, a 22% surge from $5.5 billion in September and $6.9 billion in August.

== Boycott of American goods in India ==
Following the implementation of a 50% tariff on Indian products by Donald Trump, there have been calls from certain individuals to boycott American brands, including McDonald’s, Coca-Cola, Amazon, and Apple, as a form of protest against the US tariffs. This movement has encouraged business leaders and supporters of Prime Minister Narendra Modi to participate in the boycott.

== See also ==
- 2025 India–Pakistan crisis
- Canada–India diplomatic row
- Pakistan–United States trade deal
- India and the Russian invasion of Ukraine
- 2025 India–Pakistan conflict
