= Qadirpur gas field =

Natural gas field in Pakistan

Qadirpur gas field قادر پور گیس فیلڈ
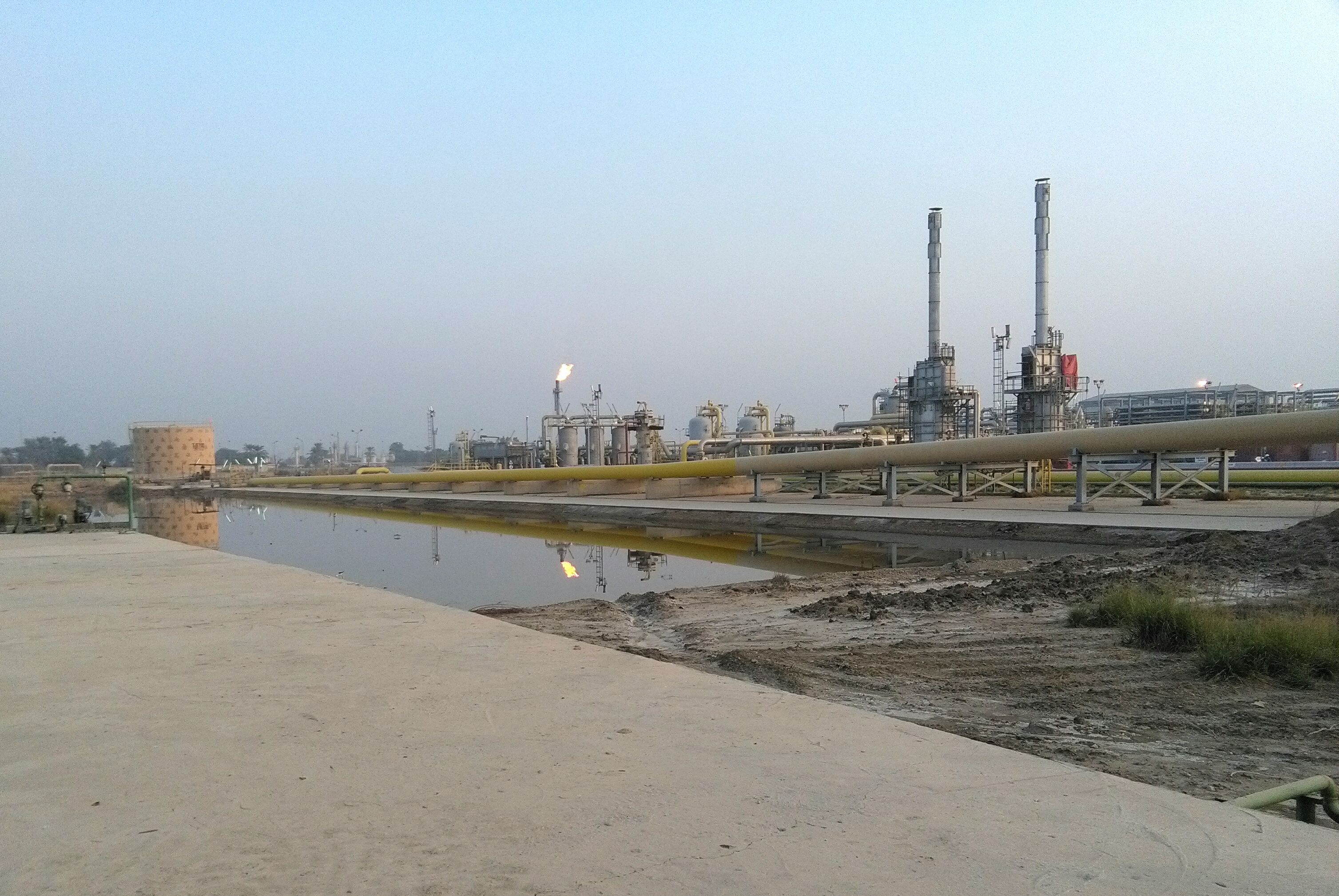
- This gas field is one of largest gas producing field of Pakistan

- Location within Sindh Location within Pakistan
- Country: Pakistan
- Location: Ghotki District, Sindh
- Offshore/onshore: Onshore
- Coordinates: 28°2′49″N 69°21′47″E
- Operators: Oil & Gas Development Company
- Partners: Kirthar Pakistan, PPL, PKPEL, PKPEL-2, KUFPEC Pakistan

Production
- Current production of gas: 347.6×10^{6} cu ft/d (9.84×10^{6} m^{3}/d)
- Year of current production of gas: July 2016 to March 2017
- Recoverable gas: 4,200×10^{9} cu ft (120×10^{9} m^{3})

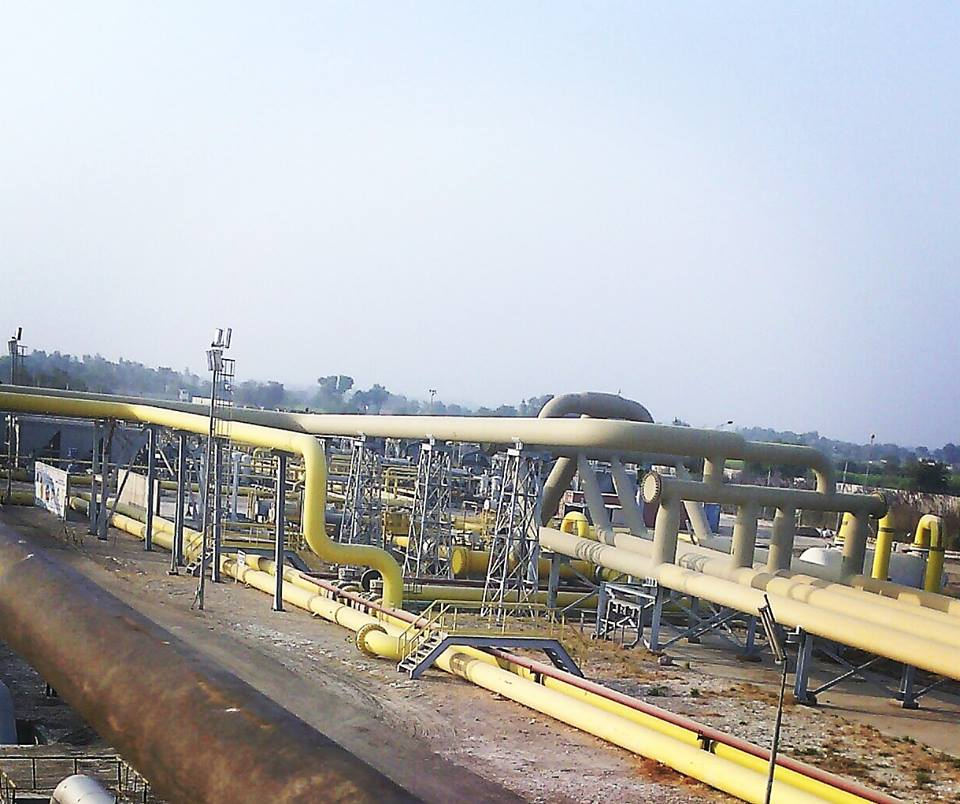
Slug catcher and Front End Compression Area

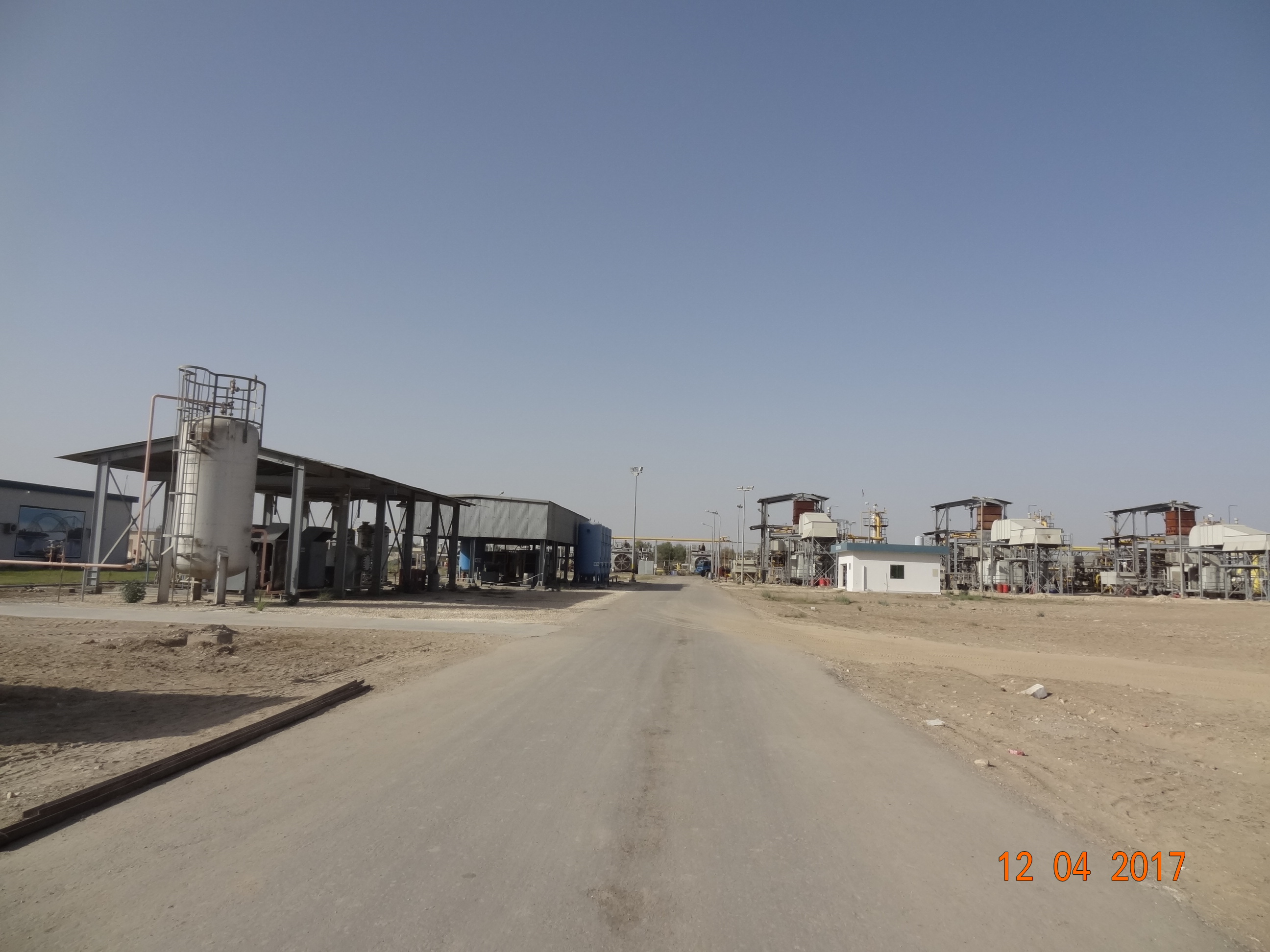
Qadirpur CCR-2

Qadirpur gas field is one of the major gas reserves of Pakistan. The field is located at a distance of 8 kilometres (5.0 mi) from Ghotki in Sindh Province.

Discovered in March 1990, it is a joint venture between Oil & Gas Development Company, KUFPEC Pakistan B.V., PKP Exploration Ltd (Premier Oil), PKP2 Exploration Ltd (KUFPEC) and Petroleum Pakistan Limited, each holding 75%, 8.5%, 4.75%, 4.75% and 7% respectively.

The Qadirpur gas field is currently one of OGDCL largest operated gas producing fields, accounting for 34%, 32% and 29% of OGDCL net gas production for 2012, 2013 and 2014, respectively. The field is located 8 km from Ghotki, 70 km northeast of Sukkur and 100 km east of Jacobabad in Sindh province.its it is located from main (90 km, sadiqabad = karachi, 540 km) highway road stop ahmed ki, 4 km away inside. Gas production on this field commenced in September 1995 by Prime Minister Benazir Bhutto after the installation of gas gathering facilities and processing plants. Of the 70 wells that have been drilled at this field, 57 are currently producing wells. Six have been abandoned, five are shut-in and two are water disposal wells. For FY 2015–16, average net daily production at this field was 250.56 million cubic feet (7.10 million cubic metres) per day at standard conditions of purified gas with 67 million ft^{3} (1.9 million m^{3}) per day of permeate gas. The field's main customers are Sui Northern Gas Pipelines Limited, Engro Powergen Qadirpur Limited near Ghotki and Liberty Power Limited Daharki (320 mW power supply generating).

A gas processing facility of 600 million ft^{3} (17 million m^{3}) per day at standard conditions was installed at Qadirpur during 2006–7. In order to address declining reservoir pressures, gas compression facilities were being installed at the field to maintain sales gas supply at contractual delivery pressures.

The natural gas is purified by a membrane separation process that removes water vapor and carbon dioxide. The processing equipment was supplied by Honeywell’s UOP Separex™ Membrane Systems division. The process consists of ten trains of membrane skids, each containing many spiral-wound membrane elements.

During the second quarter of 2009–10, average daily sales from Qadirpur was 430 million ft^{3} (12 million m^{3}) per day at standard conditions purified gas and 25 million ft^{3} (710 thousand m^{3}) per day dehydrated gas, which was sold to SNGPL, 45 million ft^{3} (1.3 million m^{3}) per day raw gas sold to Liberty Power and 970 barrels (154 m^{3}) of condensate. The field was developed in three phases, increasing its capacity from 235 to 500 million ft^{3} (6.7 to 14.2 million m^{3}) per day at standard conditions. A project was completed in December 2007, to enhance sales 500 to 600 million ft^{3} (14 to 17 million m^{3}) per day. Development drilling at Qadirpur is continuing to maintain the gas supply to Southern Natural Gas PL.

In 2009, gas flow was declined from 600 to 380 million ft^{3} (17 to 11 million m^{3}) per day at standard conditions. Thus a front end compression project was initiated to maintain the pressure of extracted gas and completed in 2011. As a part of project, 14 Waukesha engine driven Reciprocating compressors were installed by Valerus company. Later, 3 solar turbine driven centrifugal compressors were also installed which were previously working at Pirkoh gas field (Balochistan). These compressors increase the pressure of gas from 320 to 750 pounds per square inch (2,200 to 5,200 kPa).

Later in 2010, Qadirpur gas field started supplying 67 million ft^{3} (1.9 million m^{3}) per day at standard conditions of permeate gas to Engro powergen (previously Engro power limited), which is generating 270 MW supply

With the passage of time, field is depleting and gas flow has been further declined to 320 million ft^{3} (9.1 million m^{3}) per day in 2017, In 2021-22 solar turbines provided retrofit of existing solarturbines with new compressor for changing pressure conditions, the commissioning is still under progress.

Ownership group led by: Oil & Gas Development Company; Location: Qadirpur, Ghotki, Sindh, Pakistan Completion Date: August 1995

== See also ==
- Fuel extraction in Pakistan
