= SSGC =

SSGC may refer to:

- St. Stephen's Girls' College
- Sui Southern Gas Company
