= OGDC =

OGDC may refer to:

- Oil & Gas Development Company, a Pakistani state-owned oil and gas company
- Old Glory DC, a professional rugby union team playing in Washington, DC
- Oxoglutarate dehydrogenase complex, an enzyme complex
