= Shenhua =

Shenhua may refer to:

- Shenhua CTL, a planned coal liquefaction plant in Ningdong, Ningxia, China
- Shenhua Group, a state-owned coal mining and energy company in China
  - China Shenhua Energy Company, subsidiary of Shenhua Group
- Ling Shenhua, a character from Sega's Shenmue video game series
- Shanghai Shenhua F.C., football team of Shanghai
- Shenhua (Black Lagoon), a character from the manga and anime series Black Lagoon
- The Myth (film) (Chinese: 神話; pinyin: Shénhuà), a 2005 Hong Kong action-fantasy-adventure film directed by Stanley Tong, starring Jackie Chan
- Shinhwa (신화/神話, Pinyin pronunciation), a popular South Korean boy band and hip hop group
