= Gas Infrastructure Development Cess =

Pakistani gas infrastructure funding cess

The Gas Infrastructure Development Cess (GIDC) is a cess or levy introduced by the government of Pakistan for the funding of gas infrastructure projects. The cess is applied to industrial sectors such as fertilizers, CNG, IPPs, and power plants, but not directly to the general public.

Its purpose is to finance the construction and maintenance of transnational gas pipelines, including the Iran–Pakistan gas pipeline, the Turkmenistan–Afghanistan–Pakistan–India (TAPI) Gas Pipeline, and various liquefied natural gas (LNG) and liquified petroleum gas (LPG) projects. The cess has been controversial since it was introduced in 2011 and there have been numerous legal challenges to laws introducing it, with large amounts not being paid. These challenges led to multiple court cases, including in the Sindh High Court and Peshawar High Court, and eventually escalated to the Supreme Court of Pakistan which dismissed all challenges to the GIDC in 2020 and ordered all companies to pay their arrears.

== History ==
The Gas Infrastructure Development Cess (GIDC) was introduced in November 2011 under the Pakistan Peoples' Party (PPP) government led by Asif Ali Zardari to finance the Iran–Pakistan gas pipeline. The GIDC was legislated as a Money Bill on November 25, 2011.

The introduction and implementation of the GIDC were met with legal challenges from various industries, questioning its constitutionality and reasonableness. On 13 June 2013, the Peshawar High Court (PHC) struck down the 2011 Act as unconstitutional and ordered the proceeds of the GIDC to be refunded. The government of Pakistan Muslim League (N) challenged the PHC ruling, which was upheld by the Supreme Court of Pakistan on 22 August 2014, stating that it could not be introduced through a Money Bill as it was a fee, not a chargeable tax.

In response, the government enacted the GIDC Ordinance in October 2014, which was again legally contested. This led to the introduction of the GIDC Act in May 2015, aiming to address the legal issues, and allowed compress natural gas (CNG) companies to pay only half of their unpaid cess. Despite these legislative efforts, the GIDC act faced legal challenges from fertilizer and CNG companies, leading to a series of stay orders against the billing and collection of the cess. In 2016 the Sindh High Court (SHC) struck down the act as ultra vires of the constitution, while in 2017 the PHC ruled it to be legal. The same year the Supreme Court gave the right to appeal the PHC ruling. The government withdrew an ordinance meant in August 2017 meant to waive Rs 300 billion in unpaid cess and directed the Attorney-General for Pakistan (AGP) to appeal the Supreme Court. This legal contention resulted in the accumulation of unpaid GIDC arrears from its inception in January 2012 until December 2018.

To address the accumulating arrears, the Pakistan Tehreek-e-Insaaf (PTI) government issued a presidential ordinance on 28 August 2019 to waive half of the unpaid Rs 400 billion GIDC. It proposed waiving a 50% waiver on the GIDC and a 100% waiver on accumulated interest, along with a payment plan for arrears. This ordinance targeted sectors including CNG, fertilizers, and power generation, providing them the option to settle outstanding cess amounts under specified conditions. After public criticism, prime minister Imran Khan withdrew the ordinance and ordered the AGP to approach the Supreme Court.

On 13 August 2020, the Supreme Court ruled in favour of the government and determined the GIDC to be legal, dismissing all petitions regarding the levy. The court ordered companies to pay Rs417 billion worth of unpaid cess through 24 monthly installments. However, the government was restrained from charging further GIDC until the recovery. In September 2020, under Petroleum Division instructions, gas companies for the first time increased their bills for recovery of unpaid GIDC. The same month, various petitions to high courts led to stay orders which restrained the government from GIDC recovery. In November 2020, the Supreme Court dismissed the petitions and extended the installment plan for companies to 60 months (5 years). This came after requests of the fertilizer companies due to a lack of liquidity in the industry to pay arrears.

By 2022 there were a total of 2,496 GIDC-related petitions in the judiciary. In September that year, a prime ministerial committee was established to recover Rs453 billion in unpaid GIDC by pursuing stay petitions. By 2024, the government recovered Rs 2.9 billion of a total of Rs 400 billion.

== Procedure ==
Under the Gas Infrastructure Development Cess Act, 2015, the GIDC is a statutory levy on industrial and commercial gas users. Gas utilities are required to bill, collect and remit to the Federal Government. The act's second schedule lists sector-wise rates and a later-payment surcharge (KIBOR+4%) for overdue payments. The 2015 law mandates the proceeds be directed towards the Iran–Pakistan gas pipeline, Turkmenistan–Afghanistan–Pakistan–India (TAPI) gas pipeline, LNG projects, etc.

== See also ==
- Taxation in Pakistan
- Energy policy of Pakistan
- Petroleum industry in Pakistan
- Iran–Pakistan gas pipeline
- Turkmenistan–Afghanistan–Pakistan–India pipeline
