= Pakistan-Russia Inter Governmental Commission =

Bilateral commission to promote economic ties

Pakistan-Russia Inter-Governmental Commission
- Formation: 2008
- Type: Inter-governmental commission
- Purpose: Promote economic, scientific, technical, and cultural cooperation between Pakistan and Russia
- Co-chairs: High-level representative from each country

The Pakistan-Russia Inter-Governmental Commission is a joint commission between the governments of Pakistan and Russia that focuses on promoting economic, scientific, technical, and cultural cooperation between the two countries. The commission was established in 2008 and meets regularly to discuss and implement cooperation agreements in various fields. Since the establishment of the commission, 8 meetings have been held so far.

The commission is co-chaired by a high-level representative from each country, and is composed of several working groups that focus on specific areas of cooperation, such as trade, energy, and security. The commission has been instrumental in promoting increased trade and investment between Pakistan and Russia, and has also facilitated cooperation in the fields of science and technology, culture, and education.

One of the main achievements of the Pakistan-Russia IGC was the signing of a Memorandum of Understanding (MoU) for the construction of the North-South gas pipeline in 2015, it will connect Lahore with Karachi, Pakistan's two major cities, with a 1,100 km pipeline, which will be able to transport 12.4 billion cubic meters of natural gas per year.

The commission has also played a key role in promoting cultural exchanges between the two countries, with regular cultural festivals and events being organized in both Pakistan and Russia.
