= Toot Oilfield =

Oil field in Pakistan

The Toot Oilfield is an oilfield located in Punjab Pakistan. It is located approximately 135 km (84 mi) southwest of the capital city of Islamabad. The field was discovered in the early 1960s. Pakistan Petroleum and Pakistan Oilfields explored the field in 1961, and in 1964 the first well was drilled. Commercial production started in 1967. There are about 60 million barrels (9,500,000 m^{3}) of oil in place with 12%-15% of which is recoverable. At its peak during 1986, the field was producing approximately 2,400-barrel (380 m^{3}) of oil per day.

In 2005, the Vancouver-based International Sovereign Energy signed a memorandum of understanding with the Oil & Gas Development Company, Pakistan's national oil company, to develop the Toot field.

== See also ==
- Fuel extraction in Pakistan
