= GIDC =

GIDC can refer to:

- Gujarat Industrial Development Corporation
- Gender identity disorder in children
- Gas Infrastructure Development Cess
