= Bilal Bin Saqib =

British Pakistani businessman

Bilal Bin Saqib MBE
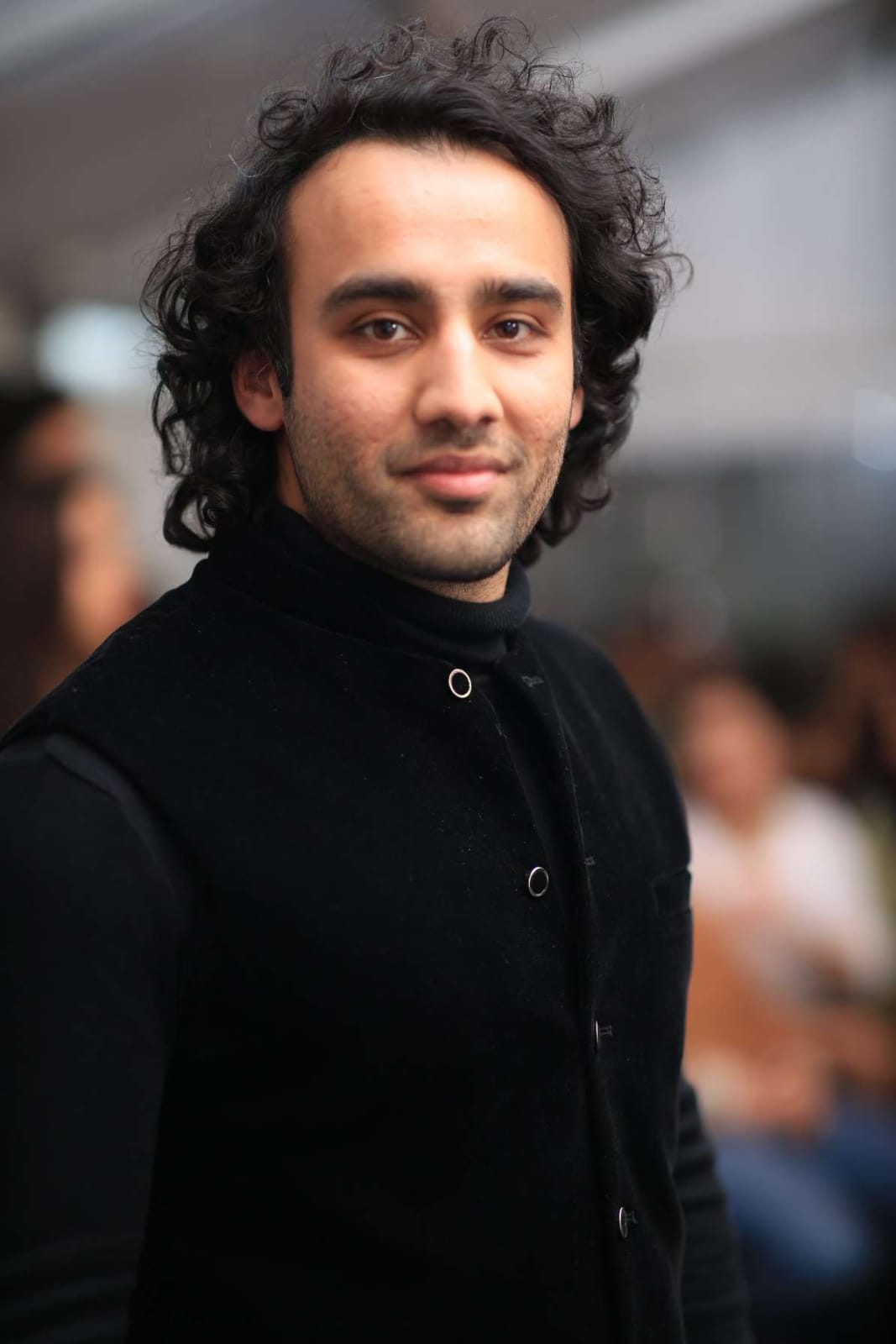

Chairman, PVARA
- In office 2 December 2025 – 2 March 2026
- President: Asif Ali Zardari
- Prime Minister: Shehbaz Sharif
- Preceded by: Nawaz Sharif

CEO of Pakistan Crypto Council
- In office 14 March 2025 – 2 March 2026
- President: Asif Ali Zardari
- Prime Minister: Shehbaz Sharif
- Preceded by: Nawaz Sharif

Special Assistant to the Prime Minister on Blockchain and Crypto
- In office 26 May 2025 – 2 December 2025
- President: Asif Ali Zardari
- Prime Minister: Shehbaz Sharif

Personal details
- Born: 1990 (age 35–36) Lahore, Punjab, Pakistan
- Citizenship: Pakistan; United Kingdom
- Relatives: Momin Saqib (brother)
- Education: London School of Economics

Bilal Bin Saqib (born July 1990) is a British Pakistani businessman and philanthropist who has served as chairman of the Pakistan Virtual Assets Regulatory Authority (PVARA) and CEO of the Pakistan Crypto Council since 2025. He previously served as Special Assistant to the Prime Minister on Blockchain and Crypto.

== Early life and education ==
Bilal was born in July 1990. He received his early education from Lahore Grammar School after which he went to Queen Mary University of London and then graduated from the London School of Economics and Political Science with a master's degree in Social Innovation and Entrepreneurship.

== Career ==
At the age of 34, Bilal co-founded One Million Meals, an initiative launched during the COVID-19 pandemic to provide free meals to NHS workers and frontline staff throughout the UK. In recognition of this work, he was awarded the Member of the Order of the British Empire (MBE).

In 2025, he was appointed as the Minister of State for Digital Assets by the Government of Pakistan to lead national efforts in developing a regulatory framework and strategy for cryptocurrency and blockchain adoption.

In December 2025, Saqib was appointed Chairman of the Pakistan Virtual Assets Regulatory Authority (PVARA), the national regulator responsible for overseeing virtual assets, cryptocurrency exchanges, and blockchain-based financial services in Pakistan.

== Awards and honours ==
He was listed in Forbes 30 under 30 Asia under social entrepreneurs.

- United Kingdom:
  - Member of the Most Excellent Order of the British Empire (MBE)
