= Pakistan–United States trade deal =

2025 trade agreement

The Pakistan–United States trade deal was concluded with a bilateral deal in Washington D.C. after intensive negotiations in July 2025, involving Pakistan's Finance Minister Muhammad Aurangzeb and Foreign Minister Ishaq Dar, alongside U.S. Trade Representative Jamieson Greer and Commerce Secretary Howard Lutnick.

On 30–31 July 2025, President Donald Trump publicly confirmed the agreement via social media, calling it a "historic" energy partnership. Prime Minister Shehbaz Sharif hailed it as a "landmark deal" enhancing their enduring partnership.

== Background ==
In May 2025, the United States involved between India and Pakistan, marking a thaw in regional tensions that laid the groundwork for renewed bilateral talks between Washington D.C. and Islamabad. Historically, trade relations had remained limited, with prior frameworks such as GSP or TIFA offering modest benefits but lacking enforceability.

The deal emerged amid shifting geopolitical dynamics in South Asia—especially growing U.S. tensions with India, Pakistan's pursuit of energy security, and Washington's strategy to diversify its regional partnerships.

Simultaneously, Pakistan's military leadership, especially Army Chief Field Marshal Asim Munir, contributed to a diplomatic outreach that improved U.S.–Pakistan ties, including counterterrorism cooperation and a personal rapport with Donald Trump.

== Provisions of the agreement ==
=== Trade and tariff reductions ===
The deal includes reciprocal tariff reductions. U.S. import duties on key Pakistani exports—such as textiles, leather goods, surgical instruments, IT services, and agricultural products—are to be lowered, providing Pakistan enhanced access to U.S. markets. Pakistan, in turn, rolled back a 5% digital services tax, signaling goodwill toward facilitating U.S. digital firms’ access.

=== Energy collaboration: oil exploration ===
A central pillar of the agreement is U.S.–Pakistan cooperation to explore and develop Pakistan’s underexplored oil reserves—particularly in offshore Balochistan and onshore regions such as Sindh, Punjab and Khyber Pakhtunkhwa. Trump stated that selecting an oil company to lead this initiative will be done with transparency, adding that “maybe they’ll be selling oil to India someday”.

Secondary aspects of the agreement include cooperation in sectors like mining, IT, cryptocurrency, and digital infrastructure.

== Economic and strategic impacts ==
=== Domestic reception ===
The Lahore Chamber of Commerce & Industry (LCCI) called the deal a game-changer, citing improved trade balance, job creation, and export growth opportunities.

The Pakistan Stock Exchange (KSE-100) rallied—rising by 978 points—as investors welcomed the trade and energy partnership.

== International analyses and critiques ==
Analysts expressed skepticism about the actual volume of Pakistan's oil reserves: despite Trump's optimism, proven reserves remain modest, with extraction challenges persisting, especially amid security concerns in Balochistan.

Editorial caution has been raised about the clarity of benefit-sharing mechanisms, transparency, and the roles of federal vs. provincial authorities in resource management.

Strategic watchers note that the accord signals a U.S. realignment in South Asia—possibly using Pakistan as a counterbalance to India and China, and securing access to rare earths and critical minerals alongside hydrocarbons.

Indian commentators viewed the U.S.–Pakistan rapprochement skeptically—the former diplomat Vikas Swarup described it as a "strategic mistake," linking it to broader geopolitical realignments.

== Security cooperation ==
The agreement aligns with simultaneous U.S.–Pakistan counterterrorism collaboration: the U.S. designated the Balochistan Liberation Army (BLA) as a terrorist organization, a move lauded by Karachi and carried out amid discussions surrounding the trade accord.

== Challenges and future outlook ==
The commercial viability of Pakistan’s oil potential remains uncertain, constrained by geopolitical volatility, investor hesitation, and logistical hurdles.

Governance remains a concern—including equitable integration of provincial stakeholders and transparency in licensing.

There is anticipation for the first shipment of U.S. crude oil to Pakistan, likely in October 2025 via Cnergyico and Vitol, symbolizing the deal's early implementation.

The potential of exports to India remains speculative, heavily contingent on regional diplomacy and stability.

== See also ==
- 2025 United States–India diplomatic and trade crisis
