= Erdos CTL =

Erdos CTL (sometimes also referred as Shenhua CTL) is a coal liquefaction plant at Ejin Horo Banner in Inner Mongolia, China. It is the biggest coal-to-liquids complex outside South Africa with a capacity of 20,000 barrels per day (3,200 m^{3}/d).

The plant cost USD 2 billion, and is owned by Shenhua Coal Liquefaction, a subsidiary of Shenhua Group. It uses direct coal liquefaction technology in a developed by Shenhua Group. In the first phase, three production lines were installed. The coal liquefaction reactor was manufactured by China First Heavy Industries. Dedicated steel belt cooling systems for a coal slurry solidification were supplied by Sandvik Process Systems.

Construction of the plant started in 2004 and it was commissioned in 2008. Trial operation started in mid-2009. Since November 2010, it is fully operational. It uses 10,000 tonnes of coal per day, and can produce 3,000 tonnes of oil. Annual output capacity is 1 million tonnes, comprising 0.62 million tonnes of diesel, 0.32 million tonnes of naphtha, and 0.07 million tonnes of liquefied petroleum gas. For each tonne of product, it uses 7-12 tonnes of fresh water, and outputs 4.8 tonnes of waste water and 9 tonnes of CO_{2}.

== See also ==
- Shenhua CTL
