= Baghalchur =

Pakistan Ministry of Energy reservation in Punjab

- Village
- Location within Pakistan
- Coordinates: 30.238455°N 70.286207°E
- Country: Pakistan
- Province: Punjab
- Time zone: UTC+5 (PST)

Baghalchur (Urdu: بغلچور; officially known as BC-1) is a reservation of the Pakistan Atomic Energy Commission (PAEC) located in the D.G. Khan District in Punjab, Pakistan. In official Pakistani government accounts, the reservation is known as Baghalchur-1 (BC-1).

== Overview ==
In 1959, the Geological Survey of Pakistan (GSP) discovered the uranium deposits but the drilling operations did not commenced until 1963.

In 1975, the Baghalchur reservation was acquired by the Pakistan Atomic Energy Commission (PAEC) and the facility construction was overseen by Bashiruddin Mahmood as its principle project engineer. Known as BC-1, the milling facility is consisted of an ore storage mill, a ball grinding mill, sulfuric acid and solvent extraction plants, a tunnel drier, and nuclear materials complex. The uranium mining at the Baghalchur started in 1978 but ceased in 2000.

The Baghalchur reservation was relatively unknown until 2006 when the local residents filed a lawsuit for unsafe nuclear waste disposal at the Supreme Court of Pakistan.

== See also ==
- Nuclear waste
- Fuel extraction in Pakistan
