= Pakistan Crypto Council =

Regulatory body in Pakistan

- شورای کرپٹو پاکستان
- Abbreviation: PCC
- Formation: 14 March 2025; 19 months ago
- Founder: Government of Pakistan
- Type: Government-backed initiative
- Legal status: Active
- Purpose: Developing regulations and promoting blockchain technology and digital assets
- Location: Islamabad, Pakistan
- Region served: Pakistan
- Official language: English (Pakistan) and Urdu
- Chairperson: Muhammad Aurangzeb
- CEO: Bilal Bin Saqib
- Adviser: Changpeng Zhao
- Parent organization: Ministry of Finance, Pakistan
- Website: pcc.gov.pk

Pakistan Crypto Council (PCC) is a Pakistani regulatory body established to develop policy, infrastructure and regulation for blockchain technology and digital assets within Pakistan. It operates under the Ministry of Finance with input from the State Bank of Pakistan (SBP), Securities and Exchange Commission of Pakistan (SECP), and other federal agencies.

== History ==
The Pakistan Crypto Council (PCC) was officially announced by the Finance Ministry in late February 2025 and formally launched on 14 March 2025. The Council was established under the guidance of Finance Minister Muhammad Aurangzeb, with the goal of integrating blockchain technology and digital assets into Pakistan’s financial landscape. Key figures in the early leadership include Muhammad Aurangzeb (Finance Minister) as head of PCC, Bilal Bin Saqib as CEO, and Changpeng Zhao as Strategic Adviser.

In June 2025, PCC agreed to establish a multi-agency technical committee with SBP, SECP, the Law Division and Ministry of IT to draft a national framework for digital and virtual assets.

== Leadership and structure ==
The PCC is led by Federal Finance Minister Muhammad Aurangzeb, who has been appointed as its head. Bilal Bin Saqib serves as the Chief of the council, providing strategic direction to its operations. The immediate governing board of the council includes officials such as the Governor of the State Bank of Pakistan, the Federal Law and IT Secretaries underscoring the institutional backing and collaborative nature of the initiative. On 7 April 2025, PCC appointed Binance co-founder, Zhao as its strategic adviser. On 26 May 2025, Prime Minister Shehbaz Sharif appointed Bilal Bin Saqib, CEO of the PCC, as Special Assistant to the Prime Minister on Blockchain and Cryptocurrency, with the rank of Minister of State.

=== Leadership ===
Role	Individual/Position
Chair	Finance Minister Muhammad Aurangzeb
CEO	Bilal Bin Saqib
Adviser	Changpeng Zhao
Board Member	Governor of the State Bank of Pakistan
Board Member	Chairman of the SECP
Board Member	Federal Law Secretary
Board Member	Federal IT Secretary

== Recent developments ==
In July 2025, the government issued the Virtual Assets Regulatory Authority Ordinance, 2025, establishing PVARA as an independent regulator for virtual assets. Earlier, at the Bitcoin Vegas 2025 conference, PCC announced Pakistan’s first government-backed Strategic Bitcoin Reserve and a plan to allocate 2,000 MW of electricity for mining and AI data centres. However, the State Bank has reiterated that cryptocurrency remains illegal under current laws, and a Senate committee has proposed amendments to the virtual assets bill to clarify the framework. Separately, the SBP has announced preparations for a pilot central bank digital currency (CBDC) project.

In September 2025, a Senate standing committee recommended that the PCC be shifted from the Ministry of Finance to the Ministry of Information Technology, arguing that digital assets fall more directly under the IT sector’s mandate.

== Legal status ==
Despite new initiatives, cryptocurrency remains in a legal grey area in Pakistan. The State Bank of Pakistan has reiterated that digital currencies are not recognized as legal tender and that existing banking laws continue to prohibit institutions from dealing in them. Analysts have described the situation as contradictory, with the Pakistan Crypto Council promoting adoption while financial regulators maintain restrictions.

Although the government announced the allocation of 2,000 MW of surplus electricity for Bitcoin mining and AI data centers, the IMF raised objections over subsidized tariffs, fiscal risks, and strain on the national grid. Reports in early July 2025 indicated that the IMF rejected the proposal in its initial form, though both sides confirmed consultations were continuing and the plan had not been finalized.

== Criticism ==
Observers and opposition politicians have criticized government-backed crypto initiatives for moving ahead without clear legislation. Concerns have been raised about the feasibility of allocating 2,000 MW of electricity for Bitcoin mining during a period of chronic energy shortages, while others have questioned the transparency of the proposed Strategic Bitcoin Reserve. The Senate Standing Committee on Finance has also expressed concerns regarding tax burdens, money laundering, and customs corruption related to crypto dealings. One member suggested a uniform 5% tax to simplify compliance and potentially increase revenue.

== Activities ==
Since its formation in 2025, the Pakistan Crypto Council has organized industry roundtables, engaged with provincial governments, and represented Pakistan at international conferences, including Bitcoin Vegas 2025. The Council also advises on draft regulations under the Pakistan Virtual Assets Regulatory Authority, and collaborates with academic institutions to promote blockchain education.

== Pakistan Virtual Assets Regulatory Authority ==
The Pakistan Virtual Assets Regulatory Authority (PVARA) was set up in July 2025 to manage and license virtual asset services in the country. It was formed under the Virtual Assets Ordinance, 2025, to make sure rules are followed, support innovation, and keep in line with international and Islamic finance standards.
