= Pakistan Stream gas pipeline =

Pakistan Stream Gas Pipeline

Location
- Country: Pakistan
- Direction: north–south
- Start: Karachi, Sindh
- To: Kasur, Punjab

General information
- Type: Natural gas
- Operator: Gazprom
- Contractors: Gazprom

Technical information
- Length: 1,100 km (680 mi)

The Pakistan Stream Gas Pipeline (PSGP) formerly known the North-South gas pipeline or PakSteam, is a Russian proposed pipeline stretching from the port city of Karachi to the city of Kasur in Punjab, Pakistan. It is a 1,100 km long project which is contracted by the Pakistani government to be built by Russia. The Pakistani government estimates that this project will cost around US$2.25 billion as of 2021 in terms of the value of the USD adjusted for inflation, so this project cost may rise in the future due to inflation expectations.

Initially the Government of Pakistan inked the agreement in 2015 in which Russia would build and operate the pipeline for the first 25 years before transferring ownership to Pakistan. However, the implementation of this agreement by the government was delayed. Since then, the agreement has been re-negotiated by the government of Imran Khan, who sought a majority share of the Pakistani government in the project with 74% of the equity owned by Pakistan and the remaining 26% equity held by Russia, making Pakistan the majority owner from the outset. Whereas the agreement inked by Sharif, Russia would have had full rights for the first 25 years of the pipeline's operation before transferring ownership of the pipeline to Pakistan. Another benefit of the new ownership structure was that it would not violate US sanctions of some Russian corporate entities.

== Pakistan's energy demand ==
During the winter months, demand for gas soars within Pakistan, and the country is a net importer of gas. This pipeline project would contribute to resolving issues with availability and transportation of gas within Pakistan, especially during the winter months.
