= Shenhua CTL =

Planned coal liquefaction plant in Ningdong, Ningxia, China

Shenhua CTL (also known as Ningxia CTL, Chinese: 神华CTL) is a planned coal liquefaction plant in Ningdong, Ningxia, China. Its planned capacity is 80,000 barrels per day (13,000 m^{3}/d). The liquefaction plant is to use a Sasol's indirect liquefaction technology, based on the Fischer–Tropsch process.

The feasibility study was carried out by Foster Wheeler and Wuhuan Engineering. The constriction is to start in October 2010 and it expected to cost US$7 billion. The project was developed by Sasol and Ningxia Coal Industry Group, a subsidiary of Shenhua Group. The agreement between companies was signed on 21 June 2006. In September 2011, Sasol pulled back from the project.

== See also ==
- Erdos CTL
