= Sui Southern Gas Company =

Natural gas company in Pakistan

Sui Southern Gas Company Limited

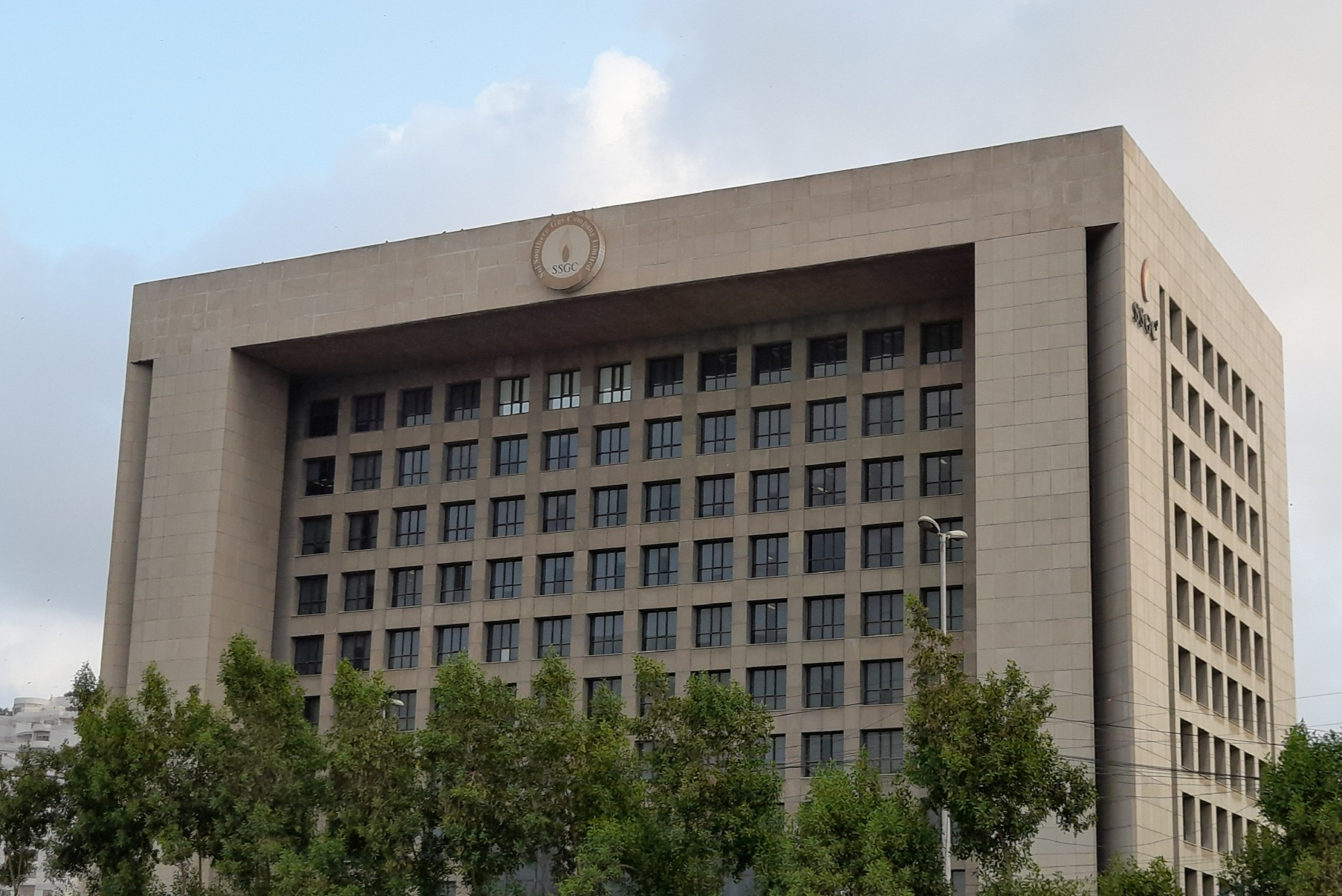
- Headquarters of the Sui Southern Gas Company in Karachi
- Type: Public
- Traded as: PSX: SSGC
- Industry: Oil & Gas
- Predecessor: Sui Gas Transmission Company Limited; Karachi Gas Company Limited; Indus Gas Company Limited
- Founded: 1954
- Headquarters: Karachi, Pakistan
- Key people: Imran Maniar (managing director)
- Products: Natural Gas Transmission & Distribution
- Revenue: ▲ Rs. 465.869 billion (US$1.7 billion) (2024)
- Operating income: ▲ Rs. 11.752 billion (US$42 million) (2024)
- Net income: ▲ Rs. 8.292 billion (US$30 million) (2024)
- Total assets: ▲ Rs. 965.401 billion (US$3.5 billion) (2024)
- Number of employees: 6,639 (2024)
- Website: ssgc.com.pk

The Sui Southern Gas Company (SSGC), (Urdu: سوئی سدرن گیس کمپنی) formerly known as Sui Gas Transmission Company Limited, is a Pakistani state-owned natural gas supply company based in Karachi, Pakistan.

Sui Southern Gas Company is Pakistan's leading integrated gas company. The company is engaged in the business of transmission and distribution of natural gas in southern part of Pakistan- mainly in Sindh and Baluchistan. Sui Southern Gas Company transmission system extends from Sui, Balochistan to Karachi, Sindh.

== History ==
=== 1954–1989: Early history ===
Sui Southern Gas Company was originally established as Sui Gas Transmission Company (SGTC) in 1954 to purchase natural gas from Pakistan Petroleum, which had discovered natural gas in Sui, Balochistan in 1952. It was responsible for transporting gas to Karachi and other intermediate markets via pipeline. The funding for SGTC came from multiple sources including Pakistan Industrial Development Corporation (PIDC), Commonwealth Development Finance, Burmah Oil, and general public. Original pipeline was built at a cost of $25 million, including a $14 million loan from the International Bank for Reconstruction & Development.

The construction of the 347-mile pipeline with a 16-inch diameter and a capacity of 110 million cubic feet of gas per day was carried out by Pakistan Constructors, a joint venture between Morrison Knudsen and William Press. The project commenced in July 1954 and was completed by April 1955. In 1955, it was listed on the Karachi Stock Exchange following an initial public offering.

By September 1955, the pipeline was operational, distributing gas to consumers. In the Federal District, Karachi Gas Company was formed to handle local distribution, with a capital of PKR 15 million, funded equally by the public, PIDC, and Industrial Management Limited as the managing agents. Additionally, Indus Gas Company was established under the supervision of PIDC to distribute gas to regions outside the Federal Capital area, with managerial and technical support from Italian firm, Snam. In 1973, a loan of US$29.66 million was taken from the Asian Development Bank to fund the construction of Sui–Karachi gas pipeline.

=== 1989–present: Sui Southern Gas Company ===
In March 1989, Sui Gas Transmission Company, Karachi Gas Company, and Indus Gas Company were merged to form the Sui Southern Gas Company.

== Subsidiaries ==
SSGC owns and operates the only gas meter manufacturing plant in the country, under an agreement with Schlumberger Industries, France.

== See also ==
- Sui gas field
- Sui Northern Gas Pipelines Limited
- Sui Southern Gas Company cricket team
