= Iran–Pakistan gas pipeline =

Gas pipeline

Location
- Country: Iran; Pakistan
- Direction: Iran to Pakistan:West–East; Within Pakistan:South–North
- Start: Asalouyeh, Bushehr, Iran
- Passes through: Bandar-Abbas; Iranshahr; Khuzdar; Sui
- To: Multan, Punjab, Pakistan

General information
- Type: Natural gas
- Partners: National Iranian Oil Co. Sui Northern Gas Pipelines; Sui Southern Gas Pipelines. Gazprom JSC
- Expected: On Hold

Technical information
- Length: 2,775 km (1,724 mi)
- Maximum discharge: 40 billion cubic metres (1.4×10^{12} cu ft) per year
- Diameter: 56 in (1,422 mm)

The Iran–Pakistan gas pipeline, also known as the Peace Pipeline, or IP Gas, is an under-construction 2,775-kilometre (1,724 mi) pipeline to deliver natural gas from Iran to Pakistan.

Although construction of the pipeline began in 2011, the Pakistani government did not officially approve its work until 2024.

== History ==
=== 1950s-2009: Inception ===
The idea was conceived by a young Pakistani civil engineer Malik Aftab Ahmed Khan (Sitara e Jurat), a graduate of NED University, in mid-1950, when an article of his was published by the Military College of Engineering, Risalpur, Pakistan. The article Persian Pipeline also mentioned the method for its protection along the hostile territory by establishing mini battalion-size cantonments along its proposed route through Balochistan/Sindh. The project was conceptualized in 1989 by Rajendra K. Pachauri in partnership with Ali Shams Ardekani and Sarwar Shar, former Deputy Foreign Minister of Iran. Pachauri proposed the plan to both Iranian and Indian governments. The government of Iran responded positively to the proposal.

Discussions between the governments of Iran and Pakistan started in 1995; a preliminary agreement was signed that year. This agreement foresaw the construction of a pipeline from the South Pars gas field to Karachi in Pakistan. Later Iran proposed to extend the pipeline from Pakistan into India. In February 1999, a preliminary agreement between Iran and India was signed.

In 2004 the project was revived after the UNDP's report Peace and Prosperity Gas Pipelines by Pakistani petroleum engineer, Gulfaraz Ahmed, was published in December 2003. The report highlighted the benefits of the pipeline to Pakistan, India and Iran.

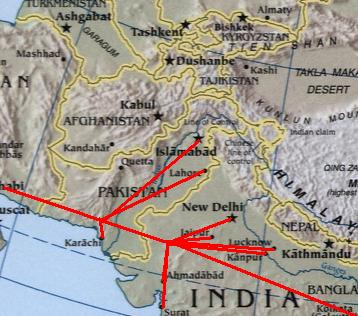
2007 proposed routes including Indian contribution

In February 2007, India and Pakistan agreed to pay Iran US$4.93 per million British thermal units (US$4.67/GJ) but some details relating to price adjustment remained open to further negotiation.

In April 2008, Iran expressed interest in the People's Republic of China's participation in the project. The same year, India signed a civilian nuclear deal with the United States, and in 2009 withdrew from the gas pipeline project over pricing and security issues.

=== 2010-2012: Project start ===
In January 2010, the United States asked Pakistan to abandon the pipeline project. If canceling the project, Pakistan would receive assistance from the United States for the construction of a liquefied natural gas terminal and importing electricity from Tajikistan through Afghanistan's Wakhan Corridor.

In March 2010, India renewed its interest in the project and called on Pakistan and Iran for trilateral talks to be held in May 2010 in Tehran. Iran and Pakistan signed an agreement on the pipeline on March 16 in Ankara. According to the agreement, each country was to complete its section by 2014.

At the 2010 annual conference of the International Association of Energy Economics, Ali Shams Ardekani advocated for Pachauri's proposal, and in August 2010, Iran invited Bangladesh to join the project.

In July 2011, Iran announced that it had completed the construction of its section. If Pakistan did not fulfill its obligation to complete the pipeline on its side by the end of 2014, it was to pay a daily penalty of $1 million to Iran until completion.

On 13 March 2012, Pakistan's Ministry of Finance announced that private investors were showing diminished interest and that the government might have to impose a tax on consumers or seek government-to-government arrangements with Iran, China and Russia to build the pipeline. On 29 March it was reported that officials from Pakistan's petroleum ministry would travel to Russia in early April for talks with Gazprom. Then, in a 7 April, article the Pakistani daily PakTribune reported that Gazprom would both finance and construct the pipeline. This would require setting aside the Public Procurement Regulatory Authority rules which require international bidding for such a large project. The Economic Coordination Committee would be asked in its next meeting to give such permission. The article also informed that the reason the private consortium no longer would contribute to the project was US opposition.

On 15 April 2012, it was reported through unnamed diplomatic sources in Islamabad that Saudi Arabia was offering to deliver an "alternative package" to Pakistan if the country abandoned its cooperation with Iran. In addition to oil, the package would also include a cash loan and oil facility. The news came in connection with a visit to Pakistan by the Saudi deputy foreign minister. But on 1 May 2012, it was reported that Pakistan's foreign minister, Hina Rabbani Khar had said that Islamabad would not give in to US pressures to mothball the project and would finish the huge pipeline project "at any cost" and that the project was in line with the country's national interest.

On 4 September 2012, the project was announced to commence before October 2012 and be completed by December 2014.

=== 2013-2014: Controversy in Pakistan ===
On 29 January 2013, US consul general Michael Dodman threatened Pakistan with economic sanctions if it did not abandon the project. The next day, Pakistan's federal government approved a deal with Iran for laying the Pakistan's segment of a pipeline. On 27 February 2013, the construction of the Pakistani section was agreed. On 11 March 2013, the construction work on the Pakistani section of the pipeline was inaugurated by the President of Pakistan Asif Ali Zardari and the President of Iran Mahmoud Ahmadinejad. According to Javad Owji, managing director of the National Iranian Gas Company, the pipeline in Pakistan is expected to be constructed in 22 months with the participation of Iran.

On 27 May 2013, Iranian deputy minister for petroleum, A. Khaledi, in a letter to the Pakistan government expressed concern over the delay in the start of the Pakistani portion of the pipeline. He said that after a government-to-government agreement between the two countries, they were supposed to select entities for the construction of the latter part of the pipeline, but Pakistan still hadn't officially nominated Tadbir Energy and local sub-contractors to begin work on the Pakistani half of the pipeline.

On 12 June 2013, the newly elected prime minister of Pakistan, Nawaz Sharif, allayed any fears regarding the abandonment of the project and said that the Pakistani government is committed to the fulfillment of the project and targets the first flow of gas from the pipeline in December 2014. The premier also stated that his government is planning to commit to the Turkmenistan-Afghanistan-Pakistan-India gas pipeline project as well.

In late October 2013, the Sustainable Policy Development Institute published a report in which the proposed pipeline was termed as a "death sentence" for Pakistan. Since the prices in the contract are linked to crude oil prices, the government "blatantly ignored the energy dynamics and its pricing while going for this deal". The gas sold to Pakistan would be higher priced than the current domestic prices of gas in the country.

On 10 November 2013, a meeting between Pakistan Federal Minister for Petroleum and Natural Resources Shahid Khaqan Abbasi and Iranian Minister of Petroleum Bijan Namdar Zangeneh was held at the Ministry of Petroleum in Tehran. The Pakistani Officials assured their Iranian counterparts that the project would continue despite "external pressure". On 28 November 2013, a 'friendly' country anonymously offers $1 billion to help fund the pipeline.

On 25 Feb 2014, Minister for Petroleum and Natural Resources Pakistan, Shahid Khaqan Abbasi told the National Assembly that the project for the moment is off the table, he cited international sanctions as the issue, he said, " In the absence of international sanctions the project can be completed within three years, but the government cannot take it any further at the moment because international sanctions against Iran are a serious issue". Pakistan will face the penalty if it fails to lay its side of the pipeline by December 2014. Analysts however point to Saudi Arabia's pressure not to carry out the project.

As per an April 2014 news article, Iran planned to abandon the pipeline project altogether. During the state visit of Prime Minister Nawaz Sharif to Iran in May 2014, both the government stated to remain committed to the completion of the pipeline and also agreed to extend the completion date by one year. However, on 30 May 2014, ISNA news agency quoted Iranian Deputy Oil Minister for International and Trade Affairs Ali Majedi as claiming that the deadline has not been extended as no such agreement was signed during Nawaz Sharif's visit and the deadline to complete is still December 2014.

=== 2014 and on: Partial completion and further dispute ===
During the year 2017, India planned to disassociate from this pipeline project and work on a cheaper independent undersea pipeline directly from Iran. As of early 2019, the project remained substantially delayed, with the Iranian section of the pipeline completed, but the Pakistani section still under construction and subject to renewed delays due to concerns about the impact of US sanctions against Iran.

On 23 February 2024, Pakistan approved the completion of the Iran–Pakistan gas pipeline amid fear of a potential 18 billion US dollar penalty for failing to complete the project on time.

In August 2024, Iran threatened to move the case to the International Court of Arbitration due to Pakistan's failure to construct the pipeline by the end of 2024. On 30 October 2024, Pakistan hired law firms to fight the potential case.

As of December 9, 2024, no case had been filed with the International Court of Arbitration.

== Route ==
The length of the pipeline that would be supplied from the South Pars field has been given variously as 900 kilometres (560 mi), 1,035 kilometres (643 mi), and 2,775 kilometres (1,724 mi). It starts from Asalouyeh and stretches 1,172 kilometres (728 mi) through Iran. The Iranian section is known as Iran's seventh cross-country gas pipeline. The first 902-kilometre (560 mi) part of this section runs from Asalouyeh to Iranshahr. The second 270-kilometre (170 mi) part runs from Iranshahr to the Iran–Pakistan border.

In Pakistan, the length of the pipeline is 785 kilometres (488 mi). It would pass through Baluchistan and Sindh. In Khuzdar, a branch would spur off to Karachi, while the main pipeline would continue towards Multan. From Multan, the pipeline may be expanded to Delhi. The route in Pakistan may be changed if China participates in the project.

As there are concerns over the pipeline being attacked by Baloch insurgents, an alternative offshore route from Iran to the maritime boundary between India and Pakistan off Kutch was proposed. According to this proposal, from there one branch was to run to Pakistan while the other branch was to run to Kutch.

== Technical description ==
The initial capacity of the pipeline was to be 22 billion cubic metres (780 billion cubic feet) of natural gas per year, which was expected to be raised later to 55 billion cubic metres (1.9 trillion cubic feet). However, as a bilateral project between Iran and Pakistan, the pipeline will carry only 8.7 billion cubic metres (310 billion cubic feet) of gas per year as contracted and 40 billion cubic metres (1.4 trillion cubic feet) as a maximum capacity. The pipeline has a diameter of 56 inches (1,400 mm). It is expected to cost US$7.5 billion and to be commissioned by 2013.

It is expected that gas delivered from Iran through the pipeline would cost US$11 per million British thermal units ($38/MWh) compared to $13 per million British thermal units ($44/MWh) which is expected to be the price of gas delivered through the proposed Trans-Afghanistan Pipeline and $18 per million British thermal units ($61/MWh) of imported LNG.

Authorities blamed the lack of safety measures and old infrastructure for the Thursday 14 March 2019 explosion in a gas pipeline near the city of Mahshahr in southern Iran. One child, one woman and two others were killed in the explosion.

== Companies ==
At different times several companies have been interested in building the pipeline. Companies included Gazprom, BHP, National Iranian Gas Company, Petronas, and Total. A consortium consisting of Royal Dutch Shell, BG Group, Petronas and an Iranian business group had negotiated on exporting of gas from South Pars to Pakistan. From India, GAIL had been involved. However, the pipeline's section in Iran was built by the National Iranian Gas Company. It used Khatam al-Anbiya Construction Headquarters as a subcontractor. In Pakistan, InterState Gas Systems is responsible for the construction of the pipeline. The contract for engineering, procurement, construction and financing of Pakistan's section was signed with Iran's Tadbir Energy. Iran agreed to provide a $500 million loan for construction payable in 20 years. However, on 13 December 2013, Pakistan's Minister for Petroleum and Natural Resources Shahid Khaqan Abbasi said that Iran refused to fund the project citing 'acute financial constraint' as the reason. The construction on the Pakistani side has been assigned to the Frontier Works Organisation (FWO). Pakistan authorities however said to remain committed to the project. Both sides have decided to constitute a working group which would re-establish in two months the new parameters for the projects, including a new time frame and other important issues involving financing of the pipeline to be laid down in the territory of Pakistan.

== See also ==
- Turkmenistan–Afghanistan–Pakistan–India Pipeline
- Iran–Pakistan relations
- List of power stations in Iran
- List of power stations in Pakistan
- Energy in Iran
