= Oil & Gas Development Company =

State-owned oil and gas company

Oil and Gas Development Company Limited
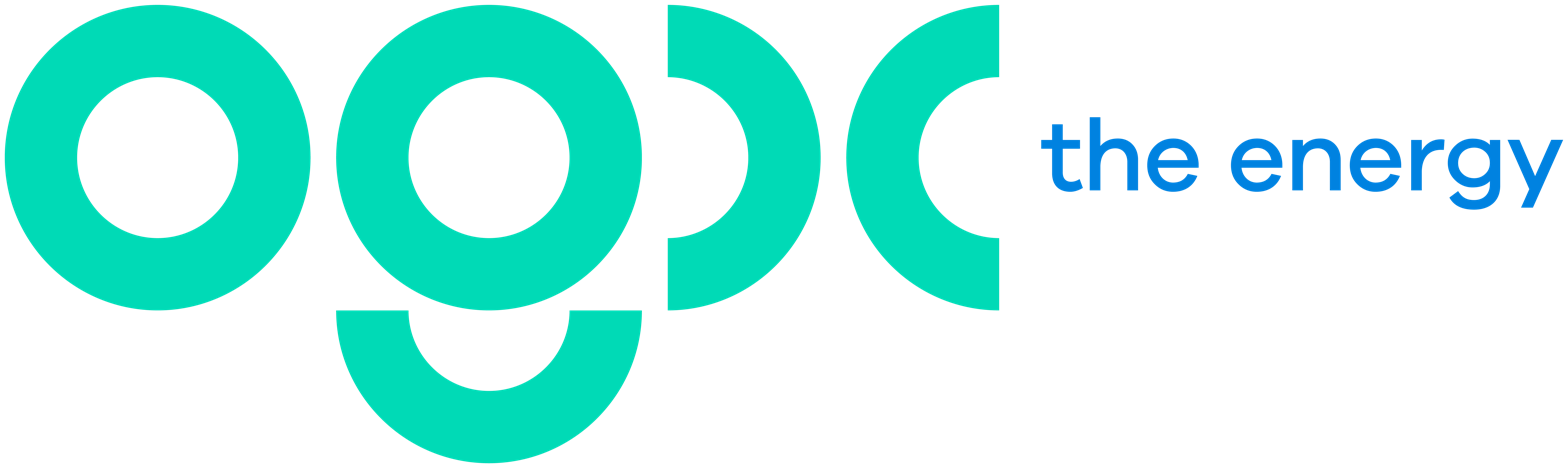

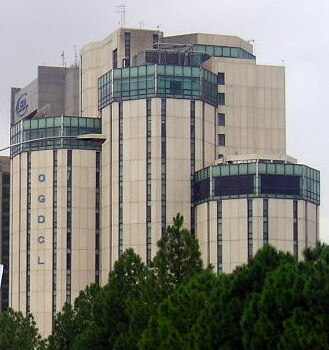
- Headquarters of the Oil & Gas Development Company in Islamabad
- Formerly: Oil & Gas Development Corporation (1961–1997)
- Type: Public
- Traded as: PSX: OGDC; KSE 100 component KSE 30 component
- Industry: Petroleum
- Founded: 4 April 1961
- Headquarters: Islamabad, Pakistan
- Area served: Pakistan
- Key people: Zafar Masud (chairman); Ahmed Hayat Lak (CEO)
- Products: Fuels, Natural gas
- Revenue: ▼ Rs. 401.18 billion (US$1.4 billion) (2025)
- Operating income: ▼ Rs. 279.31 billion (US$1.0 billion) (2025)
- Net income: ▼ Rs. 169.90 billion (US$610 million) (2025)
- Total assets: ▲ Rs. 1.654 trillion (US$5.9 billion) (2025)
- Total equity: ▲ Rs. 1.082 trillion (US$3.9 billion) (2025)
- Owner: Government of Pakistan (85.02%)
- Number of employees: 10,303 (2025)
- Subsidiaries: Pakistan Minerals Limited (33.33%); Pakistan International Oil Limited (25%); Mari Petroleum (20%)
- Website: ogdcl.com
- Footnotes; Financials as of 30 June 2025

Oil & Gas Development Company Limited (OGDCL) is a Pakistani state-owned oil and gas company headquartered in Islamabad. It is listed on the Pakistan Stock Exchange and is the largest company in Pakistan in terms of market capitalisation.

OGDCL is Pakistan's largest hydrocarbon producer, with more exploration acreage and bigger oil and gas reserves than any other company in the country. It has 18 processing plants and operations in about 50 oil and gas fields. Its fields include the Qadirpur and Uch gas fields and the Kunnar Pasakhi Deep field, and it operates the Nashpa exploration licence in Khyber Pakhtunkhwa.

== History ==
=== 1961–1997: Oil & Gas Development Corporation ===
It was established as Oil & Gas Development Corporation (OGDC) through an ordinance dated 4 April 1961 by the Government of Pakistan with the help of Soviet Union under a $30 million oil exploration loan signed in February 1961. OGDC received equipment and technical services under a $30 million loan.

Drilling of OGDC's first well began in November 1964 at Toot on the Potwar Plateau. Both the rig and the technicians assisting the work came from the Soviet Union. In 1966, OGDC found a small gas field at Sari in Sindh. In October 1967 OGDC reported that its first Toot well had struck oil at a depth of 4,460 m (14,620 ft), though it gave no flow rate. In 1968, it discovered the Toot oil field, which by 1969 yielded some 800 barrels of oil a day. The corporation also explored in East Pakistan, where it found gas at Jaldi. After Bangladesh became independent, OGDC's operations there were reorganised in 1972 as Petrobangla. The corporation's chairman later said that Pakistani engineers had taken charge of the work after the Soviet experts went home in 1970. Dhodak, in southern Punjab to the west of the Indus River, was the site of an OGDC oil and gas discovery that Prime Minister Zulfikar Ali Bhutto announced in December 1976. It was the first find of liquid hydrocarbons in Pakistan beyond the Potwar fields. In October 1977, the corporation found commercial quantities of gas at Pirkoh in Balochistan.

The World Bank's first lending to the corporation was a US$30 million International Development Association credit for the development of the Toot field, approved in December 1978. OGDC set up its Oil and Gas Training Institute in Karachi in 1977 and moved it to Islamabad in 1979, but poor pay cost it a steady stream of staff, some of them among its ablest, who went to better-paid jobs in the Middle East or to private companies.

By 1982, its Dakhni No. 1 wildcat in the Potwar region had been drilled to 4,950 m (16,240 ft), overtaking Toot No. 2, drilled in 1970, as the deepest well in Pakistan. It opened the Tando Alam oil field in Hyderabad District in May 1984 and discovered the Pasakhi field in the same district in July 1989. The corporation became self-financing in July 1989.

In 1990, OGDC discovered the Qadirpur gas field, the third-largest in Pakistan, and the 1989–90 financial year was the first in which it made a profit.

OGDC made six oil and gas discoveries in 1991, among them the Missa Keswal oil field found in August, and drilled a company-record 11 exploratory wells in a single year. In 1991, the World Bank agreed to lend US$90 million for OGDC's exploration and development work, including two development wells and a gas processing plant at Dhodak and a pipeline to carry its gas to the power station at Kot Addu. The US$98.4 million Dhodak processing complex was commissioned in 1994 to supply 1,330,891 cubic metres of gas a day to Kot Addu.

OGDC began developing the Qadirpur field in 1994, after taking up an option to lift its holding to 75 percent once the field was declared commercial. Its partners were Premier Consolidated Oilfields, Burmah Castrol and Pakistan Petroleum. An Italian joint venture of CTIP and its parent company Fochi won a US$100 million contract for the first phase of development, which was partly financed by a US$55 million World Bank loan, and OGDC brought the field into production in September 1995. OGDC was also to supply the gas for the 586-megawatt Uch power plant in Balochistan, a US$630 million private project that reached financial close in May 1996. It was the first private power plant in Pakistan designed to burn the country's low- and medium-BTU gas. OGDC owned half of the Kadanwari gas field, which its operator, Lasmo, brought into production in May 1995.

=== 1997–present: Oil & Gas Development Company Limited ===
On October 23, 1997, the corporation became a public limited company, Oil & Gas Development Company Limited. The government's privatisation board, with Prime Minister Nawaz Sharif in the chair, cleared the sale of stakes in OGDC's oil and gas fields in May 1999.

In January 2000, OGDCL agreed to take over Orient Petroleum's interests in the Khewari block and 76 percent of the Sinjhoro block and to become operator of both, and between March 2001 and January 2003 it made nine discoveries in Sinjhoro. The government appointed Merrill Lynch as the company's financial adviser in 2000.

In 2002, the government sought expressions of interest in the company but got a response from just one firm. In November 2003, it instead sold 5 percent of OGDCL, including a greenshoe option, in an initial public offering at Rs 32 a share, listing the company on the stock exchanges of Karachi, Lahore and Islamabad.

In 2004, OGDCL expanded its membrane gas-processing plant at Qadirpur from 235 to 400 million cubic feet a day of sales gas, which made it the largest operating membrane plant for natural gas in the world.

In November 2006, the government sold another 8.8 percent of the company for US$712 million in an offering managed by Citigroup and Goldman Sachs, and in December 2006 the company's global depositary shares were admitted to the London Stock Exchange. It was the first oil and gas exploration company from Pakistan to be listed in London.

In September 2008, Piotr Stańczak, a geologist with the Polish survey company Geofizyka Kraków who was working for OGDCL, was kidnapped by militants in Attock District. He was killed in February 2009. In November 2008, the Cabinet Committee on Privatisation approved selling 37 percent of the Qadirpur field with operational control, a plan opposed by trade unions, but OGDCL was still the field's operator at the end of 2009.

In 2009, OGDCL discovered oil and gas at Nashpa in Karak District, where the Nashpa No. 1 well tested at 3,000 barrels of oil and 9.7 million cubic feet of gas a day. Also, in 2009, under the Benazir Employees' Stock Option Scheme (BESOS), the federal cabinet gave its employees a 12 percent stake in the company. After the Supreme Court held in 2020 that the scheme had been implemented in violation of the constitution, the government took back all 432 million of the trust's shares in July 2026. Prime Minister Yusuf Raza Gilani chose Adnan A. Khawaja, a beneficiary of the National Reconciliation Ordinance, as managing director, but a court later ordered his removal after the appointment was judged illegal, and by September 2010 he had left the post.

In July 2011, a remote-controlled bomb killed two OGDCL officials and two security personnel travelling in a company convoy in Jafarabad District, Balochistan. The Baloch Republican Army claimed responsibility. In November 2014, the government abandoned the planned sale of 7.5 percent of the company. In November 2016, its oil production reached a record 50,172 barrels per day, 57 percent of Pakistan's total.

In 2019, OGDCL held a 25 percent stake in Kekra-1, an ultra-deepwater exploration well about 280 kilometres off the coast of Karachi that was operated by Eni, with ExxonMobil and Pakistan Petroleum. The well was found to be dry after more than US$100 million had been spent on it. In March 2019, the National Accountability Bureau, investigating allegations of illegal hiring, misused resources and the handling of corporate social responsibility funds at OGDCL, summoned the company's managing director. At the end of 2019, the federal cabinet appointed Shahid Salim Khan as managing director for three years, the first permanent appointment to the post since 2013.

In October 2020, a convoy taking OGDCL staff along the coastal highway near Ormara in Balochistan came under attack, and 14 members of its security escort were killed. Seven of the dead belonged to the Frontier Corps and the other seven were the company's own guards. The Baloch Raaji Aajoi Sangar accepted the responsibility of attack. A cabinet committee approved the sale of 7 percent of OGDCL through the stock exchanges in August 2020, but the plan was shelved in May 2021 because of depressed share prices and unresolved circular debt. By January 2021, the company's receivables had reached Rs 654 billion.

In August 2021, the Abu Dhabi National Oil Company awarded the exploration rights to its Offshore Block 5, about 100 kilometres north-east of Abu Dhabi, to Pakistan International Oil, a consortium in which OGDCL, Pakistan Petroleum Limited, Mari Petroleum and Government Holdings each held 25 percent. In 2022, OGDCL made an oil discovery in Attock of Pothohar region. Also, in 2022, OGDCL, Pakistan Petroleum and Government Holdings were each to pay US$187.5 million for an equal share of a 25 percent stake in the Reko Diq copper and gold project in Balochistan, held through their joint company Pakistan Minerals. In 2025, OGDCL raised its funding commitment to the project to US$627 million. In Pakistan's 2025 offshore bidding round, OGDCL and other companies were provisionally awarded eight blocks in the Indus and Makran basins, two of which OGDCL was to operate. In December 2025, OGDCL announced an oil and gas discovery at its Baragzai X-01 exploratory well in the Nashpa block in Khyber Pakhtunkhwa, which flowed 2,280 barrels of oil and 5.6 million cubic feet of gas per day.

In 2026, OGDCL began producing about 460 barrels of oil a day from Pasakhi-13 in Hyderabad District, which the company said was the first horizontal oil well to succeed in a clastic reservoir in Pakistan. The same year it gave Baker Hughes a multi-year contract to assess and restore production from more than 120 wells at the Pirkoh field and its Tando Alam oil complex.

== Non-operated joint ventures ==
- Adhi field; OGDCL has 50% stake
- Badar field; OGDCL has 50% working interest
- Badin-II, Badin-II revised and Badin-III fields; OGDCL has 49%, 24% and 15% stake respectively
- Badhra, Bhit and Kadanwari fields; OGDCL has 20%, 20% and 50% working interest respectively
- Bangali, Dhurnal and Ratana fields; OGDCL working interest is 50%, 20% and 25% respectively
- Miano field; OGDCL has 52% stake
- Pindori field; OGDCL holds 50% working interest
- Sara and Suri fields; OGDCL has 40% stake in the fields
- TAL Block; OGDCL working interest is 27.76%

== See also ==
- List of largest companies in Pakistan
- Oil & Gas Development Company Limited cricket team
