= Sui gas field =

Natural gas field in Pakistan

- Location within Pakistan
- Country: Pakistan
- Region: Balochistan
- Location: Sui
- Offshore/onshore: Onshore
- Coordinates: 28°38′0″N 69°12′0″E
- Operator: Pakistan Petroleum Limited

Field history
- Discovery: 1952
- Start of production: 1955

Production
- Current production of gas: 394×10^{6} cu ft/d (11.2×10^{6} m^{3}/d)
- Estimated gas in place: 12,170×10^{9} cu ft (345×10^{9} m^{3})
- Producing formations: Sui Main Limestone, Sui Upper Limestone, Pab Sandstone, Habibrahi limestone

The Sui Gas Field is a natural gas field near Sui in the Dera Bugti District of Balochistan, Pakistan, that is operated by Pakistan Petroleum Limited. The Sui gas field was discovered in 1952. It produces 8.5 million cubic metres (300 million cubic feet) per day under standard conditions.

== Production ==
The Sui Gas Field is the largest natural gas field in Pakistan with 1.6 trillion cubic feet reserve estimated as of 2017. In 2007, the Sui Gas Field accounted for 17% of Pakistan's gas production.

== See also ==
- Sui Northern Gas Pipelines Limited
- Sui Southern Gas Company
