= Sui, Balochistan =

Pakistani city

Sui سوئی
- City
- Location within Balochistan, Pakistan Location within Pakistan
- Coordinates: 28°38′24″N 69°11′29″E
- Country: Pakistan
- Province: Balochistan
- District: Dera Bugti District

Government
  - Type: Municipal Committee
  - Chairman: Vacant
  - Vice Chairman: Vacant

Population (2023)
  - City: 79,567
  - Rank: 160th in Pakistan
- Time zone: UTC+5 (PST)

Sui (Urdu: سوئی) is a city and sub-district in the Dera Bugti District of Balochistan Pakistan, known for the Sui gas field, one of the Pakistan's most significant natural gas reserves. Geographically, Sui is strategically located near the meeting point of Balochistan, Sindh, and Punjab provinces, just 9 kilometres from Punjab and 10 kilometres from Sindh.

The Indus River lies about 25 kilometres to its east, and it is situated 40 kilometres south of Dera Bugti. Sui houses gas compression facilities that supply natural gas to surrounding towns in Punjab, Sindh, and as far as Quetta, Balochistan's capital city, located around 200 miles away.

== Administration ==
The city of Sui serves as the administrative centre of Sui tehsil, a subdivision of the district. The city of Sui itself functions as a Municipal Committee.

== Demographics ==
=== Population ===
Historical population
Year	Pop.	±%
2017	72,740	—
2023	79,567	+9.4%

According to 2023 census, Sui had a population of 79,567.

Languages

Languages of Sui (2023 Census)
1. Balochi (97.1%)
2. Saraiki (1.87%)
3. Pashto (0.31%)
4. Urdu (0.14%)
5. Others (0.58%)
