= Pakistan Petroleum =

Pakistani state-owned oil and gas company

- Company type: Public
- Traded as: PSX: PPL; KSE 100 component KSE 30 component
- Industry: Energy
- Genre: Oil and gas
- Founded: 5 June 1950; 75 years ago
- Headquarters: Karachi, Pakistan
- Area served: Nationwide
- Key people: Imran Abbasy (CEO); Shahab Rizvi (Chairman)
- Products: Petroleum; Natural gas Crude Oil; Liquefied Natural Gas; Liquefied Petroleum Gas; Motor fuels Aviation fuels
- Revenue: ▲ Rs. 291.241 billion (US$1.0 billion) (2024)
- Operating income: ▼ Rs. 159.782 billion (US$570 million) (2024)
- Net income: ▲ Rs. 115.477 billion (US$410 million) (2024)
- Total assets: ▲ Rs. 913.04 billion (US$3.3 billion) (2024)
- Total equity: ▲ Rs. 640.731 billion (US$2.3 billion) (2024)
- Owner: Government of Pakistan (67.51%)
- Number of employees: 2,590 (2024)
- Subsidiaries: PPL Europe E&P Limited; PPL Asia E&P B.V.; Pakistan Petroleum Provident Fund Trust Company (Private) Limited
- Website: ppl.com.pk
- Footnotes / references Financials as of 30 June 2023

Pakistan Petroleum Limited (PPL) is a Pakistani state-owned oil and gas company headquartered in Karachi. It is one of the largest exploration and production companies in the country and contributes over 20% of the country’s total natural gas supplies. It operates in major oil and gas fields, including the Sui gas field, and has non-operating interests in other fields. PPL also has operations internationally in UAE and Yemen. Its managing director reports to the Petroleum Secretary of Pakistan.

== History ==
Pakistan Petroleum Limited was incorporated on 5 June 1950, when it inherited the assets and liabilities of the Burmah Oil Company Ltd. which initially held 70 percent of the share with the rest mostly held by the government of Pakistan (GoP).

In September 1997, Burmah Oil Company sold all its remaining equity to the Government of Pakistan for $5.75 million.

In 2004, Pakistan Petroleum was listed on the Karachi Stock Exchange, following an initial public offering at PKR 55 per share.

In 2012, Pakistan Petroleum acquired MND operations in Pakistan for $180 million. Later, it was unearthened that Pakistan Petroleum paid twice the market value and this resulted in the loss of PKR 6.21 billion. Subsequently, the National Accountability Bureau initiated corruption reference cases against the Pakistan Peoples Party politicians that started to politicize the board of directors in 2010.

== Operations ==
PPL is operator and shares 100% in two fields named Kandhkot and Sui gas field.

=== Kandhkot gas field ===
Kandhkot gas field was discovered in 1959 but due to low demand, production did not begin until 1987. It was hit by a flood in August 2010 and one of the gas gathering mains (GGM) submerged completely and two GGMs partly. There were 25 producing wells out of which 15 were shut-in. Production from the field dropped to 70 million cubic feet per day (2.0 million cubic metres per day) at standard conditions from the peak of 195 million cu ft/d (5.5 million m^{3}/d) of gas. Eight wells were bought into operation by September 2010. After repairs, production increased to 160 million cu ft/d (4.5 million m^{3}/d). Two additional wells brought into operation by mid-October 2010 adding 30 million cu ft/d (850 thousand m^{3}/d) of gas thereby increased available production to 190 million cu ft/d (5.4 million m^{3}/d). In December 2010, compression station began commercial operation to maintain contractual delivery pressure and enhance recovery ratio.

=== Sui gas field ===
Sui gas field was discovered in 1952 and is PPL's flagship natural gas project. It is under the depletion phase, gas sales during the financial year 2010–2011 were 170.8 billion ft^{3} (4.84 billion m^{3}) against 177.6 billion ft^{3} (5.03 billion m^{3}) in 2009–2010. Production commenced from two development wells and a third well spud-into during the fiscal year 2010–2011. Drilling of well Sui-92U was started in March 2010. The well was drilled up to the depth of 2,128 meters in the Pab reservoir and was successfully completed as a single-string producer from Sui upper limestone (SUL) in December 2010. Drilling of well Sui-89M started in January 2011 and was completed in February 2011. Sui-93M was drilled as a horizontal well using under-balanced drilling technology in the reservoir for the first time in pakistan to optimise field production. Well drilling started in March 2011 and completed in July 2011.

=== Partners operated producing fields ===
- Block 2669-3 (Latif)
- Block 2668-4 (Gambat)
- Block-2768-3 (Block-22)
- Block 3370-3 (Tal)
  - Manzalai field
  - Makori field
  - Mamikhel discovery
  - Maramzai discovery
  - Makori East discovery
  - Tolang discovery
- Block 3370-10 (Nashpa)
- Miano gas field
- Qadirpur gas field
- Sawan gas field

== Bolan Mining Enterprises ==
Bolan Mining Enterprises is a joint venture on an equal basis between Pakistan Petroleum and the government of Baluchistan. A grinding mill having a capacity of 50,000 tonnes per year was set up and has met almost 80 percent of the total barytes required by oil exportation companies operating in Pakistan. Bolan barytes are produced in accordance with the American Petroleum Institute specifications. Bolan has been authorised by API to use their 'official nomogram' on Bolan barytes.

During the financial year 2010–2011, the sales of barytes were 41,316 tonnes and Bolan earned a pre-tax profit of PKR 138.864 million from the barytes project in Khuzdar, as compared to PKR 148.800 million earned in 2009–2010. A sum of PKR 27.440 million appropriated towards reserves for development and expansion. The company's net 50% share of the profit was PKR 55.712 million during the financial period 2010–2011.

== Discoveries in Sindh, Balochistan ==
In December 2019, Pakistan Petroleum announced that it had made new discoveries of fresh oil and gas deposits in Sindh and Balochistan.
