= White Oil Pipeline =

White Oil Pipeline is an oil pipeline extending from Port Qasim to the Pak-Arab Refinery Company (PARCO) at Qasba Gujrat, Multan District, Punjab, Pakistan.

As of September 2000, Pak-Arab Refinery was the largest capacity refinery of 100,000 barrels per day (16,000 m^{3}/d), costing US$ 886 million commissioned well within budget and a month ahead of schedule. The White Oil Pipeline transports imported oil from Port Qasim to Pak-Arab Refinery.

The primary contractor was China Petroleum Engineering and Construction Corporation, and the sub-contractor was Techno Engineering.

== See also ==
- List of oil refineries
- Pakistan Refinery Limited
- Attock Refinery
- Pak-Arab Refinery
