= Wafi Energy Pakistan =

Pakistani oil marketing company

Wafi Energy Pakistan Limited
- Formerly: Burmah Shell Oil Distribution and Storage Company of Pakistan (1947–1970); Pakistan Burmah Shell (1970–1993); Shell Pakistan Limited (1993–2024)
- Type: Public
- Traded as: PSX: WAFI; KSE 100 component
- Industry: Oil and gas
- Founded: 1947; 79 years ago
- Headquarters: Karachi, Pakistan
- Area served: Pakistan
- Key people: Waqar Siddiqui (CEO)
- Products: Gasoline, Aviation fuels, Compressed natural gas and lubricants
- Revenue: ▼ Rs. 435.464 billion (US$1.6 billion) (2024)
- Operating income: ▼ Rs. 7.279 billion (US$26 million) (2024)
- Net income: ▼ Rs. 3.297 billion (US$12 million) (2024)
- Total assets: ▲ Rs. 113.873 billion (US$410 million) (2024)
- Total equity: ▲ Rs. 23.057 billion (US$82 million) (2024)
- Owner: Wafi Energy Holding (87.78%)
- Parent: Wafi Energy Holding
- Website: shell.com.pk
- Footnotes; Financials as of 31 December 2024

Wafi Energy Pakistan Limited, doing business as Shell, is a Pakistani oil marketing company based in Karachi. It is a subsidiary of Wafi Energy Holding, a Saudi Arabian oil and gas company. Previously, it was a part of Shell plc.

== History ==
=== Burmah-Shell (1928–1969) ===
Burmah-Shell originated in a 1928 agreement under which the Burmah Oil Company and the Royal Dutch Shell group combined the distribution of their oil products in the Indian subcontinent. In the 1940s, its Karachi office ran the business in north-western India, including Sind, the Punjab, the North-West Frontier Province, Baluchistan and Rajputana, as well as in Afghanistan.

When British India was partitioned in 1947, Burmah-Shell's territory was divided too, and its Pakistani part passed to a new sister concern, Burmah-Shell Oil Storage and Distributing Company of Pakistan. The company was registered in 1947, and by 1949 it had a registered office at Britannic House in London and a head office in the Cotton Exchange Building on McLeod Road in Karachi. During the 1950s, Burmah Shell promoted kerosene oil in Pakistan by featuring popular singers such as Mohammed Rafi in its advertisements.

In 1956, at the government's request, Burmah-Shell agreed to prepare plans for a Karachi refinery with a capacity of 20,000 barrels a day. In 1960, Burmah Oil, Shell Petroleum, Caltex and Standard Vacuum formed Pakistan Refinery to build a refinery near Karachi, taking 60 percent between them and leaving 40 percent to Pakistani investors. In 1962, the government founded Pakistan National Oil, a state-owned company for importing and selling oil products. Under a sale agreed in 1965, Shell's half of Burmah-Shell's East Pakistan business was to pass to Burmah, and in 1966 a newly formed company, Burmah Eastern, replaced Burmah-Shell as the marketer there.

=== Pakistan Burmah Shell (1969–1993) ===
Shell kept its stake in the West Pakistan business, and in 1969 the partners formed a new company there, Pakistan Burmah Shell, agreeing that Pakistani investors, among them the government's National Investment Trust, would own 51 percent of it. Pakistan Burmah Shell Limited (PBS) was incorporated on June 28, 1969, and Burmah Oil and Shell Petroleum each held 24.5 percent of its shares. When its shares were offered to the public, the issue was oversubscribed 37 times.

In 1974, the government passed legislation placing oil marketing under federal control and took over the two Pakistani-owned marketing companies, Pakistan National Oil and Dawood Petroleum. They were later merged into the state-owned Pakistan State Oil (PSO), which also absorbed Esso's Pakistani business. In 1980, PSO supplied about 60 percent of the market and PBS about a quarter. By the 1980s, PBS was one of three oil marketing companies in the country, alongside PSO, which was wholly owned by the government and held 62.5 percent of the market, and the fully foreign-owned Caltex. PBS remained in the private sector as a rupee company with foreign shareholders.

The architect Habib Fida Ali designed the company's Karachi headquarters, which was built in the mid-1970s after his entry won a limited competition. The new Karachi building into which PBS moved its offices in 1978 later became known as Shell House.

In 1986, Burmah Oil negotiated the sale of its Pakistani investments to Royal Dutch Shell. The purchase would have raised Shell's holding in PBS from 24.5 to 49 percent. The Pakistani government intervened, and in January 1987, Burmah broke off the talks after political opposition and unfavourable conditions.

In February 1993, Shell Petroleum took majority ownership of PBS, acquired Burmah's 24.5 percent and a further 2 percent of the shares on the open market, which brought its holding to 51 percent. The company was renamed Shell Pakistan Limited in 1993.

=== Shell Pakistan (1993–2023) ===
In 2001, Shell Pakistan took a 26 percent stake in the Pak-Arab Pipeline Company for US$32 million. In 2002, Shell Petroleum bought a further 5.7 million shares for US$22.3 million, raising its holding to 76.1 percent.

The 2017 Bahawalpur explosion occurred on June 25, 2017, when a tanker contracted to carry about 40,000 litres of fuel for Shell Pakistan from Karachi to Vehari overturned near Ahmedpur East and exploded, killing more than 200 people. An inquiry by the Oil and Gas Regulatory Authority (OGRA) found that the vehicle was not technically fit to carry its load and had a fake fitness certificate, and held Shell responsible as the licence holder even though the transport had been outsourced. Besides fining the company Rs 10 million, OGRA ordered it to compensate the family of each person killed with Rs 1 million and each injured person with Rs 500,000. After the regulator rejected Shell's payment of the fine alone as partial compliance and threatened legal action, the company agreed to compensate the victims.

During a fuel shortage in June 2020, OGRA fined Shell Pakistan and Total Parco Rs 10 million each, and four other oil marketing companies Rs 5 million each. In August 2022, the company stopped supplying jet fuel at the airports in Karachi, Quetta, Sukkur and Nawabshah, and ceased its jet fuel business. It had been the second-largest supplier of jet fuel in Pakistan.

=== Wafi Energy Pakistan (2023–present) ===
On October 31, 2023, Shell Petroleum agreed to sell its 165.7 million shares to Wafi Energy, a Saudi fuel retailer owned by Asyad Holding Group that held the licence for Shell-branded fuel stations in Saudi Arabia. Pakistan Refinery and Air Link, who had earlier offered to acquire the company, withdrew their interest in April 2024, and the Competition Commission of Pakistan approved the acquisition in July 2024. The agreed price for Shell's stake was Rs 118 per share, or Rs 19.55 billion (about US$70 million), and minority shareholders were offered Rs 155.11 per share. Some minority shareholders objected that the stake had been sold without a valuation and for less than two competing offers of Rs 190 and Rs 220 per share. Shell said the sale had followed a targeted process and met all regulatory requirements. The acquisition was completed in November 2024 and, in the same month, the company was renamed as Wafi Energy Pakistan.

== Operations ==
Wafi Energy Pakistan markets petroleum products, lubricants, and compressed natural gas through a network of more than 680 Shell-branded retail stations across Pakistan. Its retail sites offer fuels including Shell Super, Shell Diesel, and the premium gasoline grade Shell V-Power, alongside convenience stores operating under the Shell Select banner. The lubricants business markets Shell brands including Helix, Rimula, and Advance. Wafi also partially owns the Pak-Arab Pipeline Company (PAPCO), which operates the White Oil Pipeline, a 786-kilometre cross-country pipeline transporting diesel and motor gasoline from Karachi ports to up-country depots. Wafi holds a 26 percent shareholding in PAPCO, with PARCO holding 62 percent and Pakistan State Oil the remaining 12 percent.
