= Qasba Gujrat =

Place in Punjab, Pakistan

Coordinates: 30°09′52″N 70°57′23″E

Qasba Gujrat قصبہ گجرات is a small town in District Kot Addu, Punjab, Pakistan. The city is home to a Pak-Arab Refinery as well as a PSO oil depot and WAPDA electricity grid. Wheat, cotton and sugar cane, mangoes, citrus, guavas, and pomegranates are grown in this area. Wheat, cotton, sugarcane, and various vegetables are significant crops in Punjab. The current National Assembly Member is Mian Fayyaz Hussain Chajjra of NA-180 (Muzaffargarh-III).
