= Sardar Yasin Malik =

Pakistani politician

Provincial Minister of Sindh
- Incumbent
- Assumed office 2013

Personal details
- Occupation: Businessman

Sardar Muhammad Yasin Malik is a Pakistani industrialist and former caretaker Provincial Minister of Sindh who served in the 2013 caretaker ministry. He is the founder of Hilton Pharma.

In 2008, Malik was appointed as the chairman of Pakistan State Oil.

== Awards and recognition ==
- Sitara-i-Imtiaz
