= Strait of Hormuz =

Strait between the Persian Gulf and Gulf of Oman

- تنگه هرمز (Persian); مضيق هرمز (Arabic)
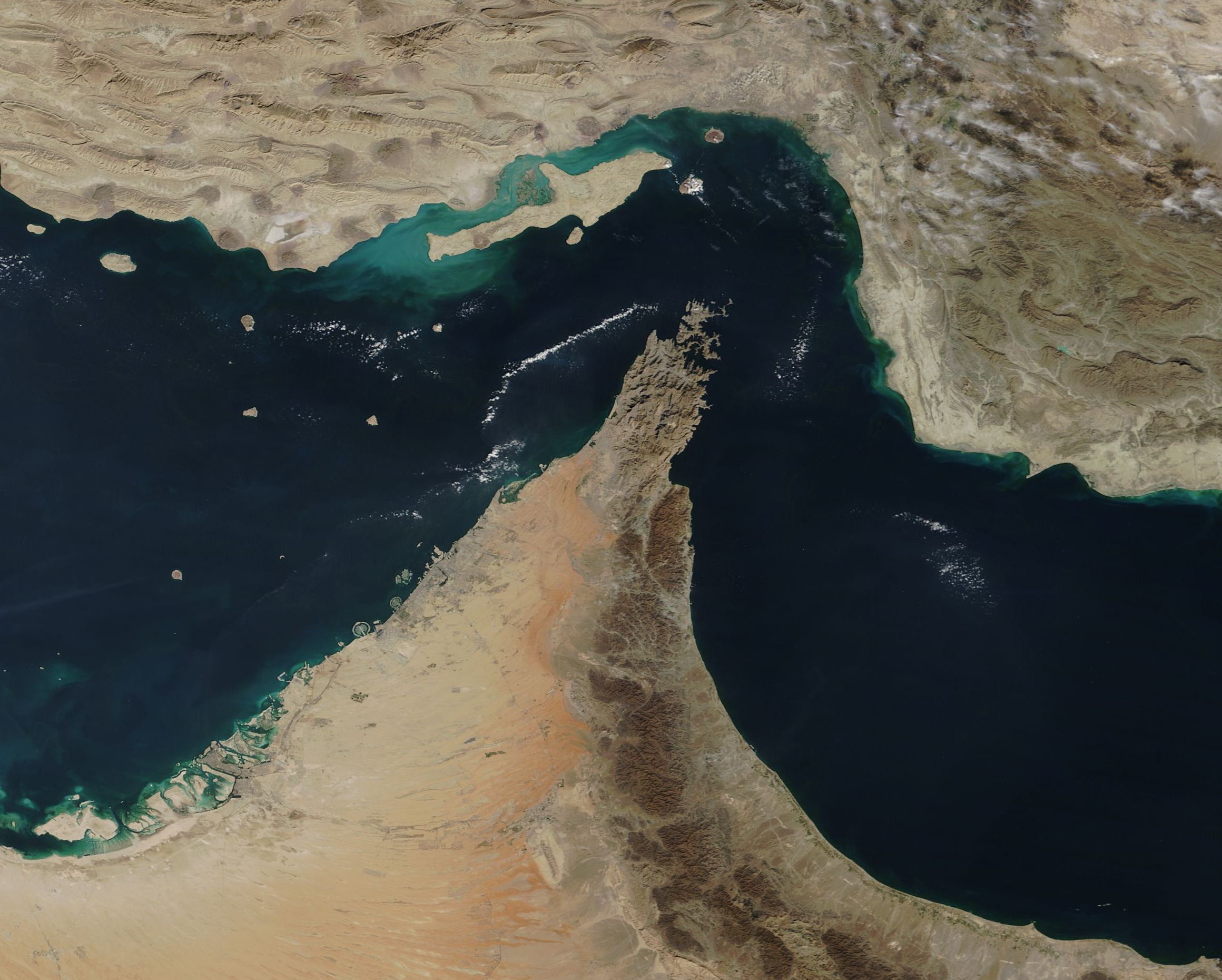
- A satellite image of the Strait of Hormuz

- Strait of Hormuz (Iran) Strait of Hormuz (West Asia)
- Location: Persian Gulf–Gulf of Oman
- Coordinates: 26.6°N 56.5°E
- Type: Strait
- Basin countries: Iran; Oman
- Min. width: 21 nmi (24 mi; 39 km)
- Islands: Hormuz Island; Qeshm Island; Larak Island; Hengam Island
- Settlements: (Iran) Bandar Abbas; (Oman) Khasab

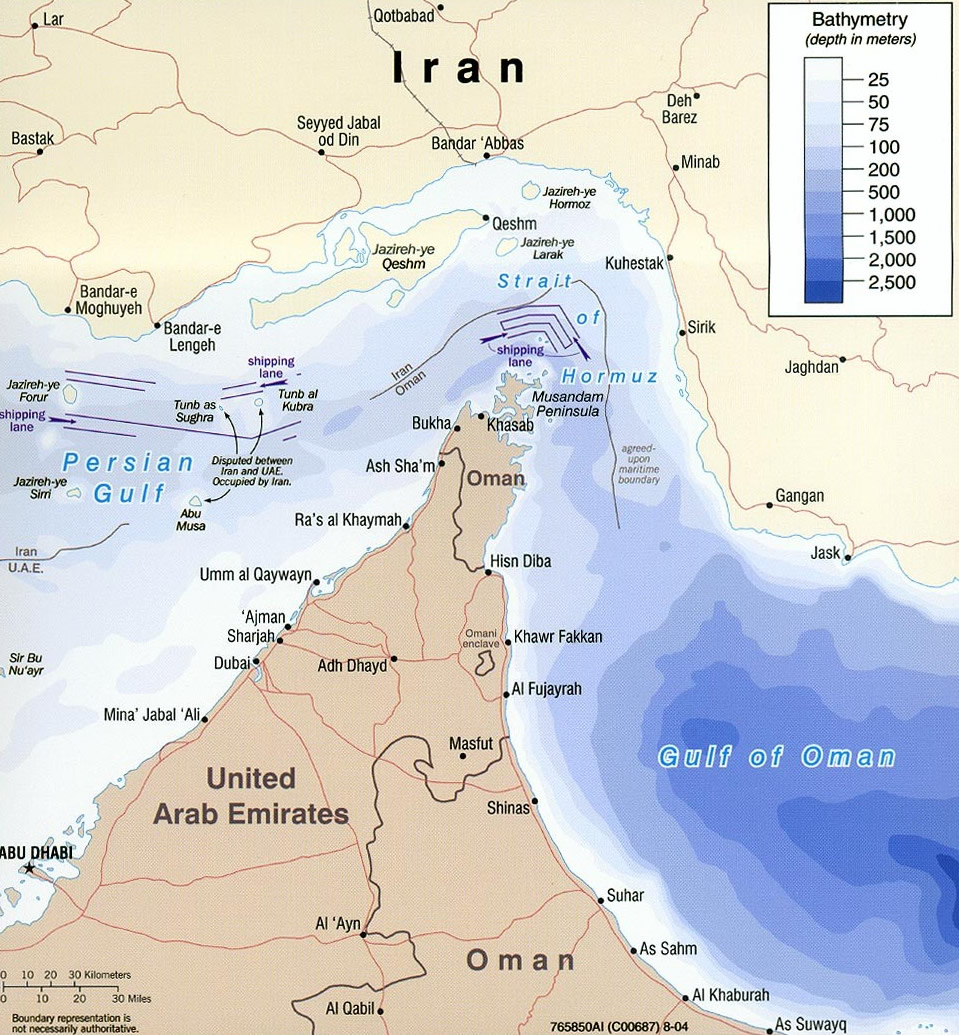
The Strait showing maritime political boundaries and shipping lanes (2004)

Strait of Hormuz showing the Musandam Peninsula of Oman in the south and Iran to the north

The Strait of Hormuz (/hɔːrˈmuːz/) (Note: Persian: تنگهٔ هرمز, romanized: Tange-ye Hormoz, Arabic: مَضيق هُرمُز, romanized: Maḍīq Hurmuz) is a waterway between the Persian Gulf and the Gulf of Oman. On the north coast lies Iran, and on the south coast lies the Musandam Peninsula under the Musandam Governorate of Oman, with a portion of the southwest of the peninsula under the United Arab Emirates (UAE). The strait is about 104 miles (90 nmi; 167 km) long, with a width varying from about 60 mi (52 nmi; 97 km) to 24 mi (21 nmi; 39 km).

It provides the only sea passage from the Persian Gulf to the open ocean and is one of the world's most strategically important choke points. During 2023–2025, 20% of the world's liquefied natural gas and 25% of seaborne oil trade passed through the strait annually. It is a major route of petroleum products for Europe and Asia and is critical for Europe's energy supply. It is also the only maritime route for several Gulf countries including the UAE, Qatar, Bahrain, Kuwait, and Iraq, and disruption to the strait can cause severe supply shortages.

Before the 2026 Iran War, the strait had not been closed for any extended time during Middle East conflicts, although Iran occasionally threatened to close the strait. The closure of the strait caused by Iranian blockades became a major focus during the war, resulting in the 2026 Strait of Hormuz crisis.

== Etymology ==
The origins of the name of Hormuz are vague. One theory is the name derives from the local Persian language word Hur-Mogh هورمغ 'Place of Dates', while another theory suggests "Hormuz" from the Middle Persian pronunciation of the name of the Zoroastrian god هرمز Hormoz (Ahura Mazda). Some sources suggest the former is more likely, while others lean towards the latter. Another theory claims that the strait of Hormuz may have been named after Ifra Hormizd, the mother of King Shapur II of Persia, who ruled between 309 and 379 AD. Yet another theory is that it comes from ὅρμος hormos, the Greek word for 'cove, bay'.

=== Historiography ===
The opening to the Persian Gulf was described, but not given a name, in the Periplus of the Erythraean Sea, a 1st-century mariner's guide:

At the upper end of these Calaei islands is a range of mountains called Calon, and there follows not far beyond, the mouth of the Persian Gulf, where there is much diving for the pearl-mussel. To the left of the straits are great mountains called Asabon and to the right there rises in full view another round and high mountain called Semiramis; between them the passage across the strait is about six hundred stadia; beyond which that very great and broad sea, the Persian Gulf, reaches far into the interior. At the upper end of this gulf, there is a market-town designated by law called Apologus, situated near Charaex Spasini and the River Euphrates.

— Periplus of the Erythraean Sea, Chapter 35

In the 10th–17th centuries AD, the Kingdom of Ormus was located here.

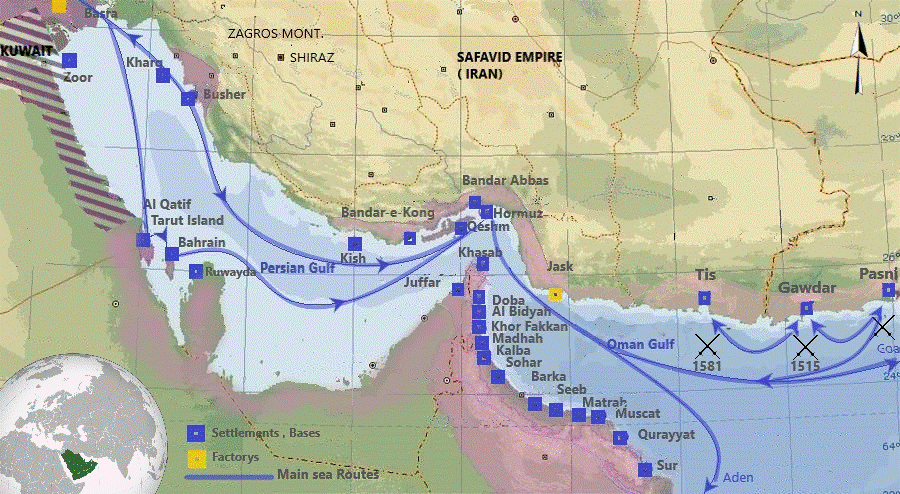
First western military dominance in the strait. Portuguese presence in the Persian Gulf (1507–1750)

From the 15th century onward, from a strategic point of view, the geography of the strait maintained and expanded its importance with the arrival of foreign powers such as Portugal, which maintained its presence between the 16th and 18th centuries, also provoking disputes with other emerging powers such as England when it arrived in the region in the 17th century.

== Geography ==
The Strait of Hormuz is a strait lying between the Persian Gulf and the Gulf of Oman. On the north coast lies Iran, and on the south coast lies the Musandam Peninsula under the Musandam Governorate of Oman, with a portion of the southwest of the peninsula under the United Arab Emirates (UAE). The strait is about 104 miles (90 nmi; 167 km) long, with a width varying from about 60 mi (52 nmi; 97 km) to 24 mi (21 nmi; 39 km).

=== Islands ===
Several islands lie within the Strait of Hormuz, including Hormuz Island, Qeshm Island, Larak Island, and Hengam Island. Some of the people living on these islands are descended from enslaved people from Africa. The Naaz islands (also spelt Naz) are joined to Qeshm at low tide, and part of the Qeshm Global Geopark.

== Navigation ==
To reduce the risk of collision, ships moving through the strait follow a traffic separation scheme (TSS): inbound ships use one lane, outbound ships another, each lane being 2 nautical miles (3.7 km) wide, with the two lanes separated by a similarly wide "median". Commercial ships of countries party to UNCLOS are obliged to follow the TSS during transit passage. The TSS is in Omani territorial waters, however, to the south-east of the strait, very large vessels need to use Iranian waters as alternative waters closer to the United Arab Emirates coastline are relatively shallow.

To traverse the full length of the strait, ships pass through the territorial waters of Iran and Oman. Although Iran has not ratified the UNCLOS convention, most countries, including the U.S. which also has not ratified it, claim the right of passage as codified in the convention.

In 1959, Iran altered the legal status of the strait by expanding its territorial sea to 12 nmi (22 km) and declaring it would recognize only transit by innocent passage through the newly expanded area. In 1972, Oman also expanded its territorial sea to 12 nmi (22 km) by decree. Thus, by 1972, the Strait of Hormuz was completely "closed" by the combined territorial waters of Iran and Oman in its narrowest section between the Omani Great Quoin Island and the Iranian Larak Island. In 1971, Iran took over the Greater and Lesser Tunbs islands west of Hormuz against Arab wishes, thereby extending control of the navigation channels.

During the 1970s, neither Iran nor Oman attempted to impede the passage of warships, but in the 1980s, both countries asserted claims that were different from customary (old) law. Upon ratifying UNCLOS in 1989, Oman submitted declarations confirming its 1981 royal decree that only innocent passage is permitted through its territorial sea. The declarations further asserted that prior permission was required before foreign warships could pass through Omani territorial waters.

Upon signing the convention in 1982, Iran entered a declaration stating "that only states parties to the Law of the Sea Convention shall be entitled to benefit from the contractual rights created therein", including "the right of transit passage through straits used for international navigation". In 1993, Iran enacted a comprehensive law on maritime areas, provisions of which conflict with UNCLOS provisions, including a requirement that warships, submarines, and nuclear-powered ships obtain permission before exercising innocent passage through Iran's territorial waters. The U.S. does not recognize any of the claims by Oman and Iran and has contested each of them.

== Trade significance ==
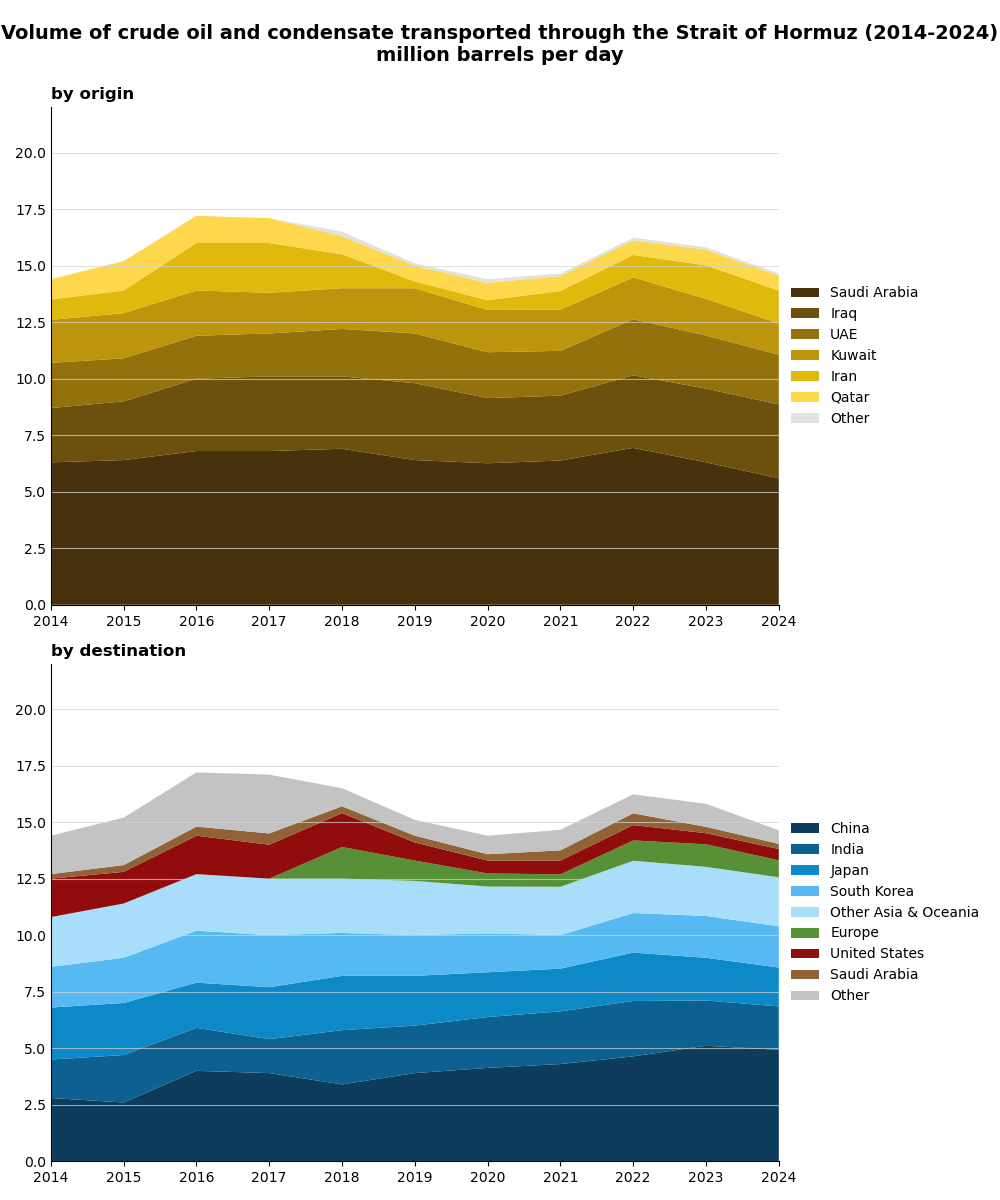
Oil trade through the strait by origin and destination, 2014–2024

The Strait of Hormuz provides the only sea passage from the Persian Gulf to the open ocean and is one of the world's most strategically important choke points. It is a major route of petroleum products for Europe and Asia and is critical for Europe's energy supply. It is also the only maritime route for several Gulf countries including the UAE, Qatar, Bahrain, Kuwait, and Iraq, and disruption to the strait can cause severe supply shortages.

During 2023–2025, 20% of the world's liquefied natural gas and 25% of seaborne oil trade passed through the Strait, illustrating its important location for trade.

According to the U.S. Energy Information Administration, in 2011, an average of 14 tankers per day left the Persian Gulf through the strait carrying 17 million barrels (2,700,000 m^{3}) of crude oil. More than 85% of these crude oil exports went to Asian markets, with Japan, India, South Korea and China the largest destinations. In 2018, 21 million barrels a day passed through the strait, worth $1.2 billion in 2019 prices.

If shipping through the Strait of Hormuz were significantly disrupted for an extended period, it could lead to a major oil supply crisis for major Asian importers such as Japan, India, South Korea, and China.

The Persian Gulf is also a major hub for global fertilizer production and exports. Countries such as the Islamic Republic of Iran, Qatar, Saudi Arabia, and Oman are among the world's leading exporters of nitrogen fertilizers, including urea and ammonia. In the 2020s the region has accounted for roughly 30–35 percent of global urea exports and around 20%–30% of ammonia exports. Overall, up to 30% of internationally traded fertilizers normally transit the Strait of Hormuz.

== Smuggling ==
The Strait of Hormuz is a major route for illicit trade between the Musandam Peninsula, an exclave of Oman, and the southern coast of Iran. The city of Khasab in Musandam is the primary hub for this cross-strait contraband economy. The geographic proximity of the two coastlines, separated by approximately 50 km (31 mi) at the strait's narrowest points, allows for the rapid transit of small, high-powered speedboats operated by smugglers.

Goods such as electronics, home appliances, cigarettes, and luxury vehicles are typically purchased in the United Arab Emirates, transported overland to Khasab, and shipped across the strait to evade the international sanctions against Iran. In the opposite direction, Iranian boats transport livestock, primarily sheep and goats destined for markets in the UAE and Saudi Arabia, particularly during Islamic holidays such as Eid al-Adha. Illicit drugs and undocumented migrants are also transported from Iran to Oman.

Omani authorities generally tolerate the trade in Khasab, as it provides a significant source of income for the geographically isolated Musandam region. Conversely, Iranian authorities officially combat the practice. The Iranian Customs and Excise Department has estimated that smuggling across the strait costs the Iranian economy tens of thousands of jobs and circumvents billions of dollars in customs duties annually. The volume of this black market changes depending on the severity of international sanctions on Iran; tighter sanctions increase the demand for smuggled consumer goods in the country. After a reduction of activities towards the end of the Barack Obama presidencies, smuggling has picked up in later years thanks to the intensifying regional conflict.

== Events ==
=== Hormuzian/Portuguese tolls ===
From approximately the eleventh century, the Hormuzians started to enforce a fixed annual levy on all commercial traffic transiting the strait, a practice that mirrored the roughly contemporaneous Danish Sound Toll on Baltic shipping and the Byzantine, and later Ottoman, duties on vessels passing through the Turkish Straits.

After seizing Hormuz in 1515, the Portuguese institutionalized the toll through their own licensing system known as the Cartaz (safe-conduct pass), a system that physically compelled any vessel trading in the Persian Gulf to route their cargo through Portuguese customs houses in order to avoid being sunk or confiscated by Portuguese warships. By the early sixteenth century, customs revenue from transit trade was estimated by Portuguese sources at roughly 200,000 cruzados annually, a huge number given that the entire Portuguese crown’s total annual revenue in 1534 was about 1.1 million cruzados, reflecting the prominence of trade between India and West Asia at the time.

The system collapsed in 1622, when the Safavids and the East India Company, the latter of which was trying to monopolize international trade from India, expelled the Portuguese. This ended Hormuz's economic importance as a toll-collecting entrepôt and shifted the Gulf trade to Bandar Abbas, located on the mainland.

=== Tanker War ===
In May 1981, Iraq began attacking commercial shipping to undermine Iran's war effort. At first, Iraqi forces targeted vessels transporting military supplies to the Iranian ground forces. Later, Iraq expanded the campaign and attacked ships carrying Iranian exports. Iran retaliated by attacking Iraq's trading partners vessels.

In 1984, Iraq broadened the tanker war by attacking the oil terminal and oil tankers at Kharg Island. In response, Iran began attacking tankers traveling to and from Kuwait and other Gulf Arab states that supported Iraq's war effort.

Both sides had declared an "exclusion zone", meaning areas in which they had warned ships from entering. Iraq declared the area around Iran's Kharg Island to be an exclusion zone.

=== Operation Praying Mantis ===
Operation Praying Mantis was an attack on 18 April 1988 by the United States Armed Forces against Iranian targets within Iranian territorial waters in retaliation for the Iranian naval mining of international waters in the Persian Gulf during the Iran–Iraq War and the subsequent damage to an American warship. The U.S. Navy attacked with several groups of surface warships, plus aircraft from the aircraft carrier USS Enterprise, and her cruiser escort, USS Truxtun. The attack began with coordinated strikes by two surface groups.

=== Downing of Iran Air 655 ===
On 3 July 1988, 290 people were killed when an Iran Air Airbus A300 was shot down over the strait by the U.S. Navy guided missile cruiser USS Vincennes (CG-49) when it was wrongly identified as a jet fighter.

=== Collisions ===
In January 2007, the nuclear submarine USS Newport News struck MV Mogamigawa, a 300,000-ton Japanese-flagged crude oil tanker, south of the strait. There were no injuries and no oil leaked. On 20 March 2009, U.S. Navy Los Angeles-class submarine USS Hartford collided with the San Antonio-class amphibious transport dock USS New Orleans in the strait. The collision ruptured a fuel tank aboard New Orleans, spilling 95 cubic metres (25,000 US gal) of marine diesel fuel.

=== Iranian navy problems ===
In May 2020, Iran launched missiles at one of their own ships in a friendly fire accident, killing 19 sailors. On 2 June 2021, the IRIS Kharg, a modified Ol-class replenishment oiler of the Iran Navy, sank in the Strait of Hormuz after catching fire. It was the navy's largest vessel.

=== Iranian ship seizures ===
On 28 April 2015, IRGCN patrol boats contacted the Marshall Islands–flagged container ship MV Maersk Tigris, which was westbound through the strait, and directed the ship to proceed further into Iranian territorial waters, according to a spokesman for the U.S. Defense Department. When the ship's master declined, one of the Iranian craft fired shots across the bridge of Maersk Tigris. The captain complied and proceeded into Iranian waters near Larak Island. The U.S. Navy sent aircraft and a destroyer, USS Farragut, to monitor the situation. Maersk says it agreed to pay an Iranian company $163,000 after an Iranian court ruling over a dispute about 10 container boxes transported to Dubai in 2005. An appeal court raised the fine to $3.6 million.

On 4 January 2021, the Tasnim News Agency reported that a South Korea–flagged oil vessel headed from Saudi Arabia to the United Arab Emirates was seized for allegedly causing pollution violations. The ship was said to be carrying roughly 7,000 tons of ethanol. South Korea refused to comment on the accusation of causing oil pollution in the Strait of Hormuz. The ship, Hankuk Chemi, was headed to the UAE port Fujairah after loading oil from Jubail, Saudi Arabia on 2 January 2021, as per ship-tracking data gathered by Bloomberg.

In April 2024, the Iranian Navy seized MSC Aries, a Portuguese-flagged container ship sailing through the Gulf of Oman off the UAE coast of the Emirati port city of Fujairah, then steered the container ship through the strait, with 25 personnel on board, claiming that it had violated maritime laws. The crew of 25 included 17 Indian nationals, Filipinos, Pakistanis, a Russian, and an Estonian.

=== Iranian preparations to mine the strait ===
As of 2019, the U.S. Defense Intelligence Agency estimated that Iran possessed over 5,000 naval mines capable of rapid deployment via high-speed boats. In June 2025, it was reported that U.S. intelligence detected, possibly through satellite imagery or human informants, that Iranian military forces loaded naval mines onto vessels in the Persian Gulf, an act which was interpreted as a preliminary step to blockading the strait. The mines were ultimately not deployed, though their presence raised alarms in Washington about Tehran's intent to escalate the conflict. It is unclear whether the mines were later removed.

=== U.S.–Iran disputes, threats to close the Strait ===
==== 2008 ====
Naval stand-offs between Iranian speedboats and U.S. warships in the strait occurred in December 2007 and January 2008. U.S. officials accused Iran of harassing and provoking their naval vessels, but Iran denied the allegations. Later reports from U.S. Navy officials appeared to contradict the Pentagon version of the event, in which the Pentagon had reported that U.S. vessels had almost fired on approaching Iranian boats. The Navy's regional commander, Vice Admiral Kevin Cosgriff, said the Iranians had "neither anti-ship missiles nor torpedoes" and he "wouldn't characterize the posture of the US 5th Fleet as afraid of these small boats".

On 29 June, the commander of Iran's Revolutionary Guard, Mohammad Ali Jafari, said that if either Israel or the U.S. attacked Iran, it would seal off the strait to wreak havoc in the oil markets. Cosgriff warned that such Iranian action would be considered an act of war, and the U.S. would not allow Iran to hold hostage a third of the world's oil supply. On 8 July, Ali Shirazi, a mid-level clerical aide to Supreme Leader of Iran Ayatollah Ali Khamenei, was quoted telling the Revolutionary Guards, "The Zionist regime is pressuring White House officials to attack Iran. If they commit such a stupidity, Tel Aviv and U.S. shipping in the Persian Gulf will be Iran's first targets and they will be burned."

In the last week of July, in Operation Brimstone, dozens of U.S., and naval ships from other countries, came to undertake joint exercises for possible military activity in the shallow waters off the coast of Iran. By 11 August, more than 40 U.S. and allied ships were en route to the strait.

==== 2011–2012 ====
On 27 December 2011, Iranian vice president Mohammad Reza Rahimi threatened to cut off oil supply from the strait should economic sanctions limit, or cut off, Iranian oil exports. A U.S. Fifth Fleet spokeswoman said the Fleet was "always ready to counter malevolent actions", whilst Admiral Habibollah Sayyari of the Islamic Republic of Iran Navy claimed cutting off oil shipments would be "easy". Despite an initial 2% rise in oil prices, markets ultimately did not react significantly to Iran's threat, with oil analyst Thorbjoern Bak Jensen concluding "they cannot stop the flow for a longer period due to the amount of U.S. hardware in the area".

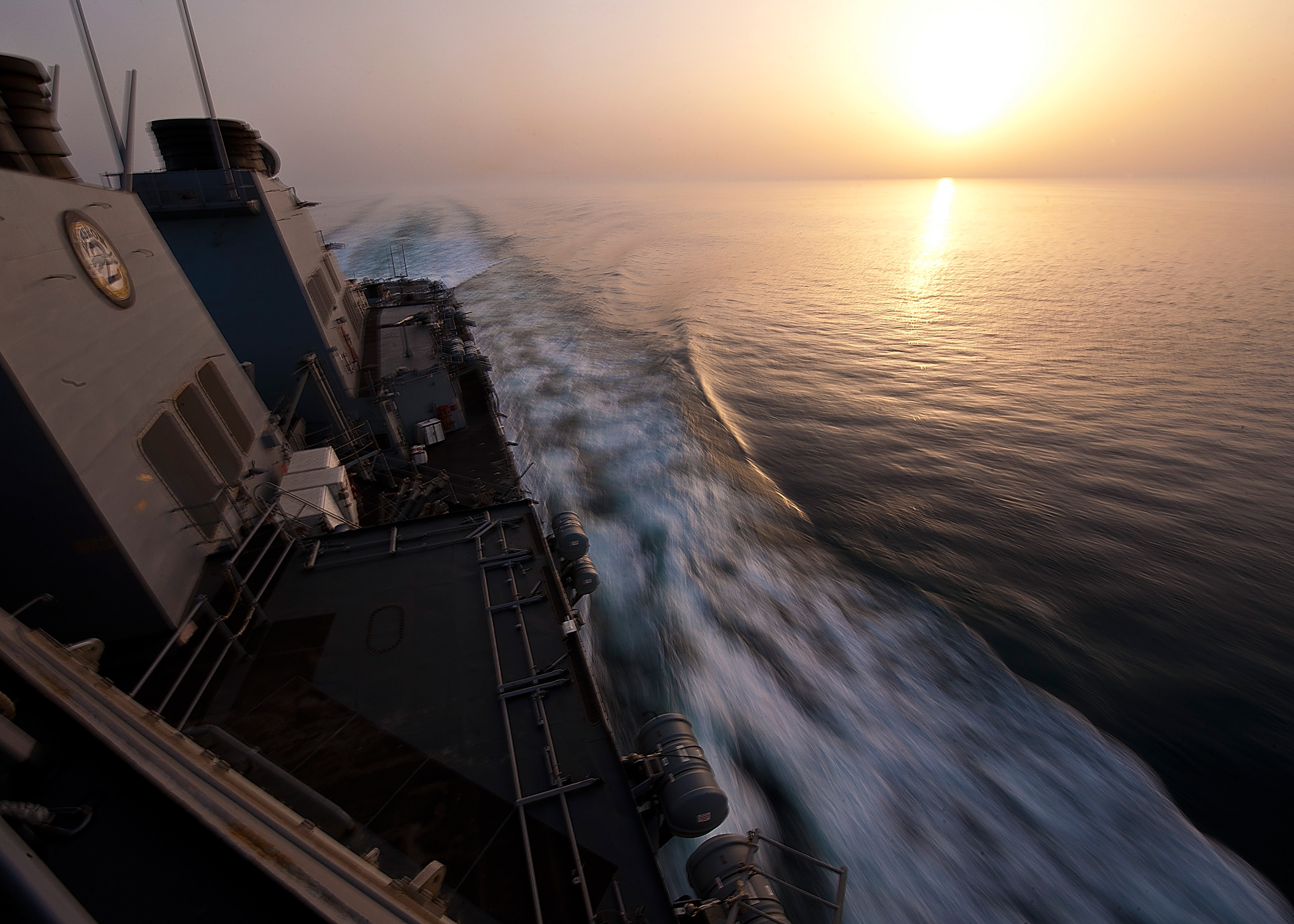
The guided-missile destroyer USS Porter transits the Strait of Hormuz in May 2012. Porter is deployed to the U.S. 5th Fleet.

On 3 January 2012, Iran threatened to take action if the U.S. Navy moved an aircraft carrier back into the Persian Gulf. Iranian Army chief Ataollah Salehi said the U.S. had moved a carrier out of the Persian Gulf because of Iran's naval exercises, and Iran would take action if the ship returned. "Iran will not repeat its warning ... the enemy's carrier has been moved to the Gulf of Oman because of our drill. I recommend and emphasize to the American carrier not to return to the Persian Gulf", he said.

U.S. Navy spokesman Commander Bill Speaks responded that deployment of U.S. military assets would continue as has been the custom stating: "The U.S. Navy operates under international maritime conventions to maintain a constant state of high vigilance in order to ensure the continued, safe flow of maritime traffic in waterways critical to global commerce." While earlier statements from Iran had little effect on oil markets, coupled with new sanctions, later comments drove crude futures higher, up over 4%. Pressure on prices reflected a combination of uncertainty driven further by China's response – reducing oil January 2012 purchases from Iran by 50% compared to 2011.

By January 2012, U.S.-led sanctions began to show economic effects, as the Iranian currency lost 12% of its value. Further pressure on Iranian currency was added by France's Foreign Minister Alain Juppé who was quoted as calling for more "strict sanctions" and urged EU countries to follow the U.S. in freezing Iranian central bank assets and imposing an embargo on oil exports.

On 9 January 2012, Iran's Defense Minister Ahmad Vahidi denied that Iran had ever claimed it would close the strait, saying that "Iran is the most important provider of security in the Strait ... if one threatens the security of the Persian Gulf, then all are threatened." Iran's Foreign Ministry confirmed on 16 January it had received a letter from the U.S.; authorities were considering whether to reply, although the contents of the letter were not divulged. The U.S. had previously announced its intention to warn Iran that closing the strait is a "red line" that would provoke an American response.

General Martin Dempsey, the chairman of the Joint Chiefs of Staff, said the U.S. would "take action and re-open the Strait", which could be accomplished only by military means, including minesweepers, warship escorts and potentially airstrikes. U.S. defense secretary Leon Panetta told troops that the U.S. would not tolerate Iran closing the strait. Nevertheless, Iran continued to discuss the impact of shutting the strait on oil markets, saying any disruption of supply would cause a shock "no country" could manage.

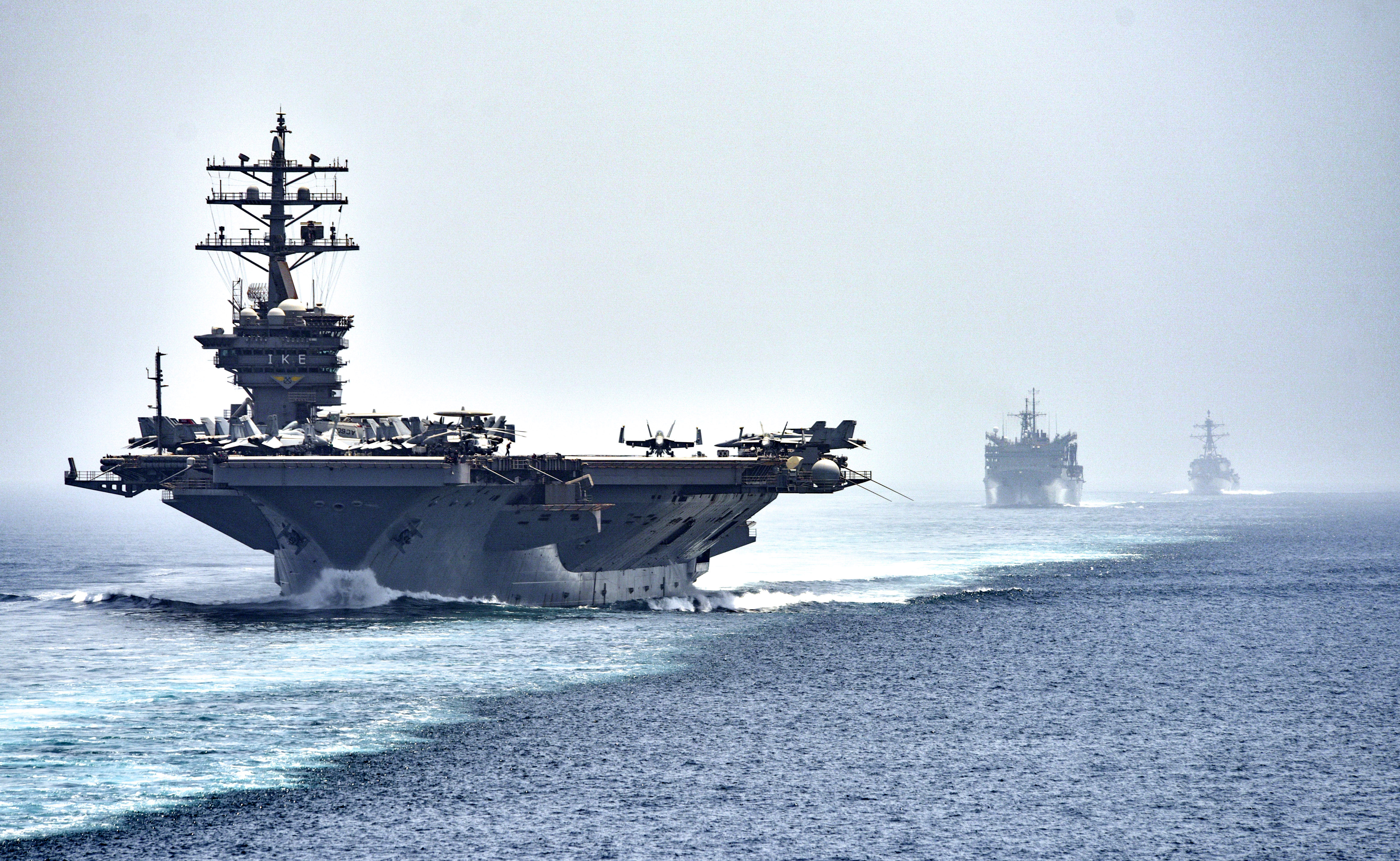
A U.S. Navy convoy in the strait in July 2016

By 23 January, a flotilla had been established by countries opposing Iran's threats to close the strait. These ships operated in the Persian Gulf and Arabian Sea off the coast of Iran. The flotilla included three American aircraft carriers, three destroyers, seven British warships, including the destroyer HMS Daring and four Type 23 frigates, and the French frigate La Motte-Picquet. On 24 January, tensions rose further after the European Union imposed sanctions on Iranian oil. A member of Iran's parliament said, "If any disruption happens regarding the sale of Iranian oil, the Strait ... will definitely be closed".

==== 2018–2019 ====
In July 2018, Iran again made threats to close the strait, citing looming American sanctions after the U.S. withdrew from the JCPOA deal. In August, Iran test-fired a ballistic missile. According to the officials, the anti-ship Fateh-110 Mod 3 flew over 100 miles on a flight path over the strait to a test range in the Iranian desert. "It was shore-to-shore", said a U.S. official.

On 22 April 2019, the U.S. ended the oil waivers, which had allowed some of Iran's customers to import Iranian oil, without risking financial penalties as part of U.S. economic sanctions. Al Jazeera quoted Major-General Mohammad Bagheri of the Iranian Armed Forces, stating "We are not after closing the Strait of Hormuz but if the hostility of the enemies increases, we will be able to do so... If our oil does not pass, the oil of others shall not pass the Strait of Hormuz either".

==== 2019 attacks on oil tankers ====
Iran has persistently attacked vessels and seized ships amidst political issues. On 13 June 2019, the oil tankers Front Altair and Kokuka Courageous were rocked by explosions shortly before dawn; the crew of the latter reported seeing a flying object strike the ship. They were rescued by the destroyer USS Bainbridge while the crew of the Front Altair were rescued by Iranian ships. U.S. secretary of state Mike Pompeo issued a statement accusing Iran of the attacks, Iran denied this calling it a false-flag attack.

In July 2019, a Stena Bulk Tanker, Stena Impero, sailing under a British flag, was boarded and captured by Iranian forces. The spokesman for Iran's Guardian Council, Abbas Ali Kadkhodaei, was quoted as describing the seizure as a "reciprocal action". This was presumed to be in reference to the seizure of an Iranian tanker bound for Syria, Grace 1, in Gibraltar a few days prior.

In 2020, France deployed about 600 troops at sea and in the air under the CTF474 to protect maritime trade, regional business, and to ease local tensions. Since the first week of April 2020, the operation combines the Dutch frigate Ruyter, the French frigate Forbin, and one French airplane ATLANTIC2 (ATL2).

==== 2025 ====
On 14 June, Iran reportedly issued a threat to block the strait in response to Israeli attacks targeting its military and nuclear infrastructure. The Financial Times reported that such action could cause oil prices to surge beyond the recent 7–14% increases, possibly exceeding $100 to $150 per barrel. This would likely fuel global inflation and contribute to an economic downturn. Analysts emphasized the vulnerability of regional exporters, noting that "Saudi Arabia, Kuwait, Iraq and Iran are wholly locked into one tiny passage for exports." The strait handles 18 to 19 million bbl (2.9 to 3.0 million m^{3}) per day, nearly 20% of global oil consumption, including crude, condensates, and fuel. Analysts have warned that Iran could suffer severe consequences from any attempt to block the strait. "Iran's economy heavily relies on the free passage of goods and vessels through the seaway, as its oil exports are entirely sea-based," analysts from JP Morgan explained. Closing the strait could strain Iran's crucial energy trade with China, its only major oil customer. U.S. Secretary of State Marco Rubio also warned Iran against attempting to shut down the strait, stating that such a move would be "economic suicide" for the Islamic Republic, as the waterway is vital for its exports. On 17 June, two oil tankers collided in the strait, though reports did not suggest that this was a security-related incident. The vessels involved were the Front Eagle, carrying crude oil from Iraq to China, and the Adalynn, which was unladen and en route to the Suez Canal. Both caught fire on deck, but no oil spill occurred. All crew members aboard the Adalynn were safely evacuated by the UAE coast guard.

After the U.S. strikes on Iranian nuclear sites on 22 June, the Iranian Parliament voted to close the strait. However, the final decision on closure was left to Iran's Supreme National Security Council. Revolutionary Guards commander Esmaeil Kousari confirmed that shutting the strait would be executed "whenever necessary", to protect national sovereignty and deter further foreign aggression. Closure of the strait, through which 20% of the world's oil supply transits, would significantly disrupt global energy markets if implemented. Given the strait's critical role as a maritime chokepoint for crude oil, liquefied natural gas, and other petroleum products, its closure could cause oil prices to increase and risk destabilizing the global economy. On 23 June 2025, oil prices were below $70 again (7% lower than on 20 June), indicating that the oil market viewed the U.S. strikes, and Iran's response (the strait remaining open, and 2025 Iranian strikes on Al Udeid Air Base), as inconsequential.

==== 2026 ====
Before the 2026 Iran War, the strait had not been closed for any extended time during Middle East conflicts (unlike the Straits of Tiran/Bab-el-Mandeb) although Iran occasionally threatened to close the strait, and preparations to mine it have been undertaken. The closure of the strait caused by Iranian blockades became a major focus during the war, resulting in the 2026 Strait of Hormuz crisis.

Before the 2026 Israeli–U.S. strikes on Iran, ship insurance for the strait increased from 0.125% to between 0.2% and 0.4% of the ship insurance value per transit. For very large oil tankers, this is an increase of a quarter of a million dollars. By 9 March, insurance rates were reported to have increased by four to six times over the previous week, and the U.S. government began to help insurers under the Terrorism Risk Insurance Act. Within days of the conflict, tanker traffic through the strait collapsed, restricting shipments by more than 90%, around 10 million barrels per day of oil production. The restrictions on shipping in the Strait has led to disruptions that are raising energy and agricultural input costs worldwide.

On 28 February 2026, amid the 2026 Iran war and after the assassination of Iranian supreme leader Ali Khamenei, Iran's Revolutionary Guards began issuing VHF transmissions stating that ship passages through the Strait of Hormuz were "not allowed". Although the closure is not legally binding, military and industry sources say that safety cannot be guaranteed, and many ships stayed in port or turned back, while at least 17 oil tankers continued traveling through the strait.

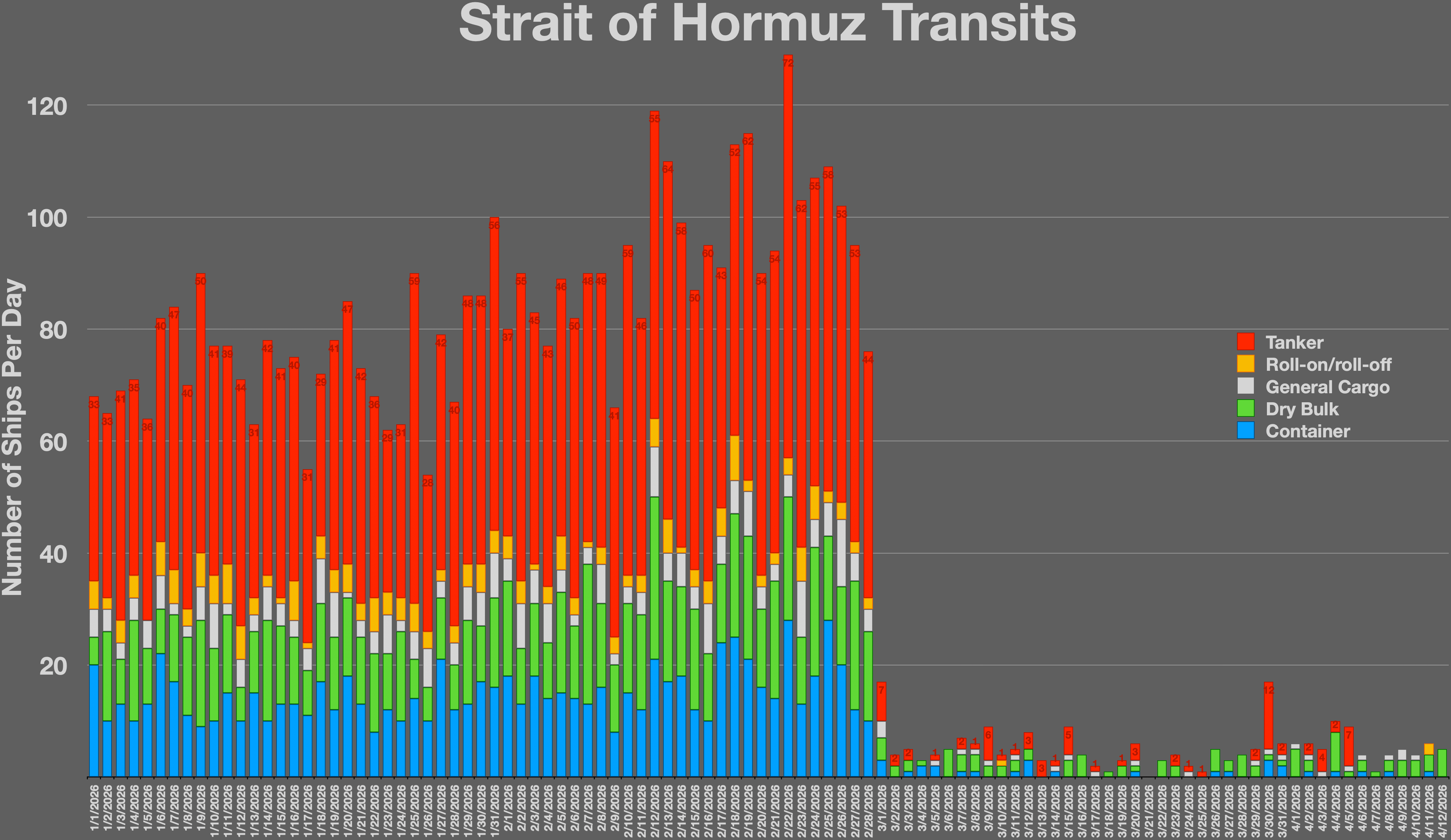
Strait of Hormuz transits dropping away in early 2026.

On 2 March, the Islamic Revolutionary Guard Corps officially confirmed that the Strait of Hormuz was closed and that any ship that entered the strait was to be set on fire. This came after several reports of Iranian attacks on ships passing into the Strait of Hormuz. However, a few ships still passed the strait unharmed. The next day, President Donald Trump stated that the U.S. Navy may escort oil tankers through the Strait of Hormuz.

On 12 March, three cargo vessels were hit in the Strait of Hormuz. This came on the same day as the release of 400 million barrels of oil announced by the International Energy Agency. It was also reported that Iran had deployed about a dozen mines in the Strait of Hormuz, halting the exports of oil and liquefied natural gas (LNG).

On 15 March, Trump asked several nations—specifically China, France, Japan, South Korea and the United Kingdom, but also Canada and Australia—to send warships and assist in securing the Strait of Hormuz. Trump, noting that these nations are beneficiaries of the shipping route, pressured NATO and allies to help secure it following shipping disruptions. Most nations refused to assist, as they want a diplomatic de-escalation instead of war. The United Kingdom has offered limited cooperation in securing critical shipping routes; the broader refusal highlights a significant rift between Washington and its traditional partners.

Trump has warned that the planned summit with Chinese leader Xi Jinping may be at risk if China does not assist the U.S. in securing the Strait of Hormuz. This crucial waterway, through which 20% of global oil passes, is facing disruptions due to ongoing tensions between the U.S., Israel, and Iran. Trump emphasized that China, which relies on the strait for 90% of its energy imports, should share the responsibility of keeping it open, rather than leaving it solely to the U.S. to secure.

As of 31 March 2026, Iran remains determined to assert control over the Strait of Hormuz, and has reportedly successfully blocked two Chinese ships.

British Prime Minister Keir Starmer, referring to the difficulty of reopening the Strait of Hormuz, said that if the war stops, we will need a negotiated agreement with Iran. West Point analysis warns that strait of Hormuz blockade will strangle US defense industry.

On 3 April 2026, the vote on a proposal to the UN Security Council put forward by Bahrain was postponed to 4 April. The proposal was aimed to reopen the strait for commercial shipping. Also, as of 3 April 2026, three Oman tankers, two carrying oil and a third LNG, appeared to escape from the Persian Gulf by taking a new route close to the Omani coastline, bypassing the normal Hormuz route.

On 7 April 2026, Russia and China blocked a UN resolution, aimed to protect commercial shipping in the Strait of Hormuz. Out of 15 members, 11 voted in favor of the resolution, two were neutral, Russia and China called it biased against Iran.

In early April 2026, the Strait of Hormuz faced severe navigational threats and near-total closure by Iranian forces amid escalating military tensions with the U.S. and Israel. This closure caused major disruptions in global energy markets, leading Saudi Aramco to set record crude oil price premiums for Asian buyers. Iran eventually agreed to reopen the strait following a two-week provisional ceasefire announced on 8 April 2026. Later that day, the strait was closed again following continued Israeli attacks on Lebanon. On 11 April, peace negotiations between the U.S. and Iran in Islamabad resulted in failure to end the war, after U.S. military warships crossed the Strait of Hormuz in a move to open the waterway. The next day, President Trump said that "effective immediately" the U.S. Navy would prevent ships from passing through the Strait of Hormuz. On 17 April, Iran declared the Strait of Hormuz 'completely open' due to the recently declared ceasefire in Lebanon. This was followed by a Truth Social post by President Trump that said the strait is "completely open", but that the American naval blockade will remain in effect until negotiations with Iran have concluded. As a result, Iran scrapped the agreement to reopen the Strait. Video footage was also released which confirmed that ships were in fact turning away from the Strait.

On 1 May 2026, the US Treasury's Office of Foreign Assets Control stated that external US persons and companies were generally banned from paying Iranian government entities to secure safe passage, and that non-US persons might risk exposure to sanctions if they made such payments.

In May 2026, in response to heavy US sanctions, Iran's Ministry of Economy and Financial Affairs announced that it would provide bitcoin-backed insurance policies for Iranian ships transporting goods through the Strait. Specifically, Fars News Agency wrote "Cryptographically verifiable insurance policies will be provided for shipments passing through the Persian Gulf, the Strait of Hormuz, and the surrounding waterways, and payments will be settled in Bitcoin."

As part of its negotiations with the United States to end the war, Iran has argued that it is not bound by the 1968 traffic separation scheme it had agreed to with Oman under the auspices of the International Maritime Organization specifying the protocol for passage of vessels through the Strait of Hormuz, arguing that the agreement was reached before the 1979 Iranian revolution and that the current Iranian government is not bound by it.

On August 8, Commander Mohammad Baqer Zolqadr, Secretary of Iran’s National Security Council, stated that Iran would reopen the Strait of Hormuz if the United States changed its conduct. This includes Iran’s conditions such as lifting the naval blockade on Iran, providing compensation for war damages, releasing frozen Iranian assets unconditionally, removing sanctions on Iran, and permanently ending hostilities with Iran and its regional allies.

== Ability of Iran to hinder shipping ==
Islands near the Strait of Hormuz

Millennium Challenge 2002 was a major war game exercise conducted by U.S. armed forces in 2002. It simulated an attempt by a country (likely to be Iran) to close the strait. Iran's simulated strategy beat the materially superior U.S. armed forces.

A 2008 article in International Security contended that Iran could seal off or impede traffic in the strait for a month, and an attempt by the U.S. to reopen it would be likely to escalate the conflict. In a later issue, however, the journal published a response which questioned key assumptions and suggested a much shorter timeline for re-opening.

Moreover, due to Iran's own dependence on oil exports through the strait as well as imports, (due to its inability to refine oil on its own) a closure of the strait is unlikely. Not only Iran's own dependence on the strait for imports and exports is indicative that a prolonged closure is unlikely, but also the dependence of its allies on the trade that flows through it suggest the logistical infeasibility of such closure.

A neoclassical-realist analysis describes Iranian policy regarding the strait as "double-faced": in non-existential threat environments Tehran tends to act as a security provider by keeping the strait open, whereas under threats perceived as existential it takes calculated risks and incorporates the waterway into a wider deterrence and brinkmanship strategy. This interpretation portrays Iran as a reactive actor that employs interference or brinkmanship to gain concessions and trigger de‑escalatory measures from the international community. This literature also emphasizes that Iran's strategy with respect to the strait is constrained by its own reliance on the waterway, that of key partners, material limits and sanctions, which lowers its freedom to take risks and suggests that any prolonged closure would be particularly damaging for Iran itself and its allies.

In December 2011, Iran's Navy began a ten-day exercise in international waters along the strait. Iranian Rear Admiral Habibollah Sayyari stated that the strait would not be closed during the exercise; Iranian forces could easily accomplish that but such a decision must be made at a political level. Captain John Kirby, a Pentagon spokesman, was quoted in December 2011 saying: "Efforts to increase tension in that part of the world are unhelpful and counter-productive. For our part, we are comfortable that we have in the region sufficient capabilities to honor our commitments to our friends and partners, as well as the international community." Suzanne Maloney, an expert at the Brookings Institution, said, "The expectation is that the U.S. military could address any Iranian threat relatively quickly." General Martin Dempsey, Chairman of the Joint Chiefs of Staff, said in 2012 that Iran "has invested in capabilities that could, in fact, for a period of time block the Strait of Hormuz." He stated, "We've invested in capabilities to ensure that if that happens, we can defeat that."

A May 2012 article by Nilufer Oral, a Turkish researcher of maritime law, concludes that both the UNCLOS, which came into effect in 1994; and the 1958 Convention on the High Seas would be violated if Iran followed through on its threat to block passage of vessels, such as oil tankers, and that the act of passage is not related in law to the imposition of economic sanctions. The article further asserts that a coastal state may prevent "transit or non-suspendable innocent passage" only if: 1) there is threatened or actual use of force, occurring during passage, against the sovereignty, territorial integrity, or political independence of a state bordering the strait; or 2) the vessel in any other way violates the principles of international law as embodied in the Charter of the United Nations.

As of 2013, the UNCLOS treaty had been ratified by 63 states, including most NATO-bloc and Soviet-bloc nations but with the notable exceptions of most of the OPEC and Arab League nations like Syria, Egypt, Jordan, Saudi Arabia, and Iran, as well as China, North Korea, and South Korea. As of February 2026, 157 sovereign states, including the EU are parties, including all major powers except the U.S., which has not ratified the treaty.

== Alternative shipping routes ==
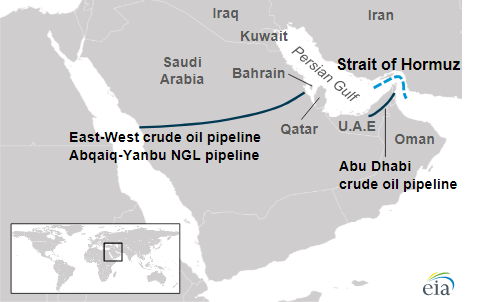
A map of the Habshan–Fujairah oil pipeline and the East–West Crude Oil Pipeline

Model of which crude oil flows could bypass the strait via the East–West and Habshan–Fujairah pipelines and which would be stranded, based on 2025 trade flows

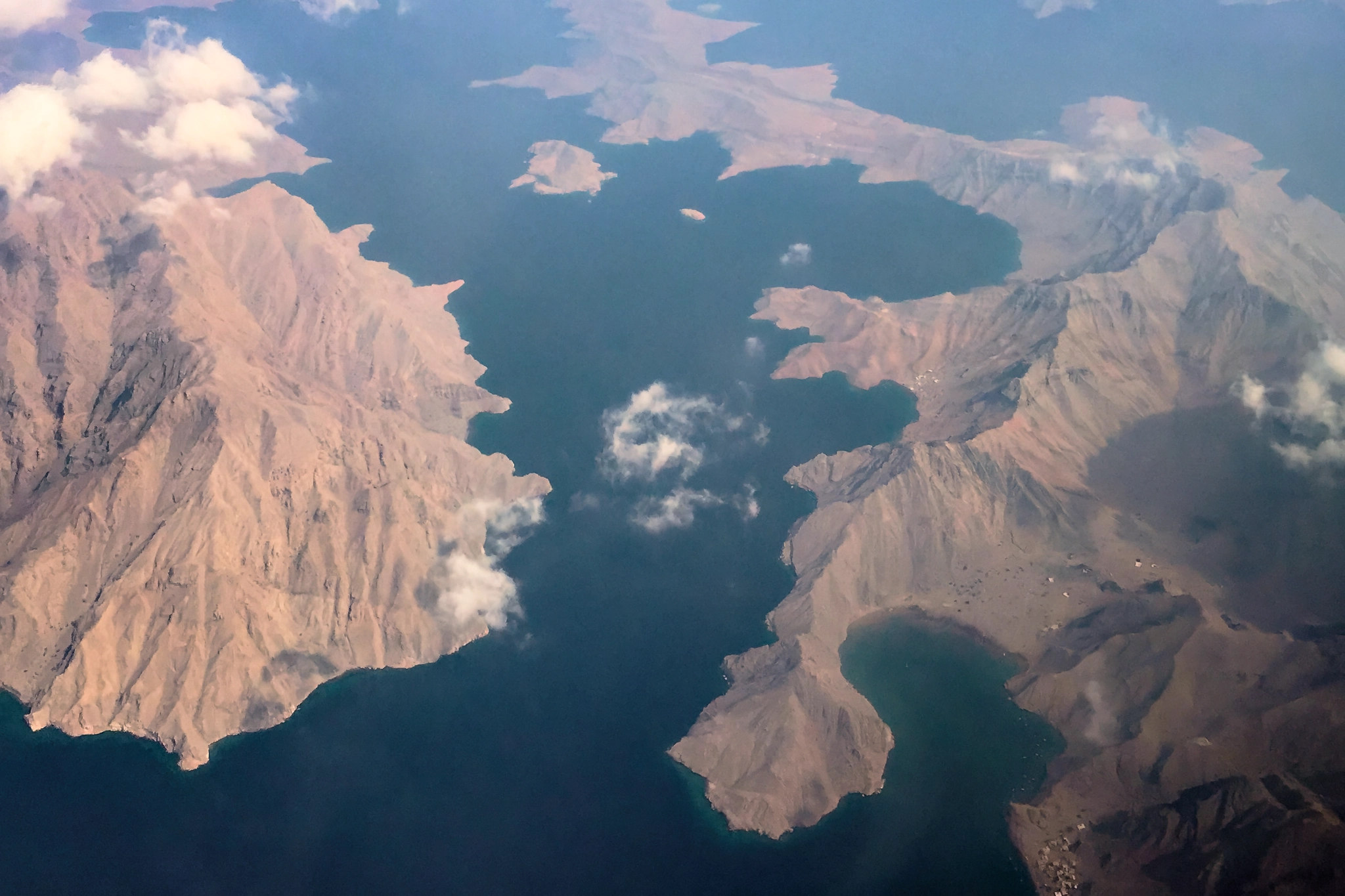
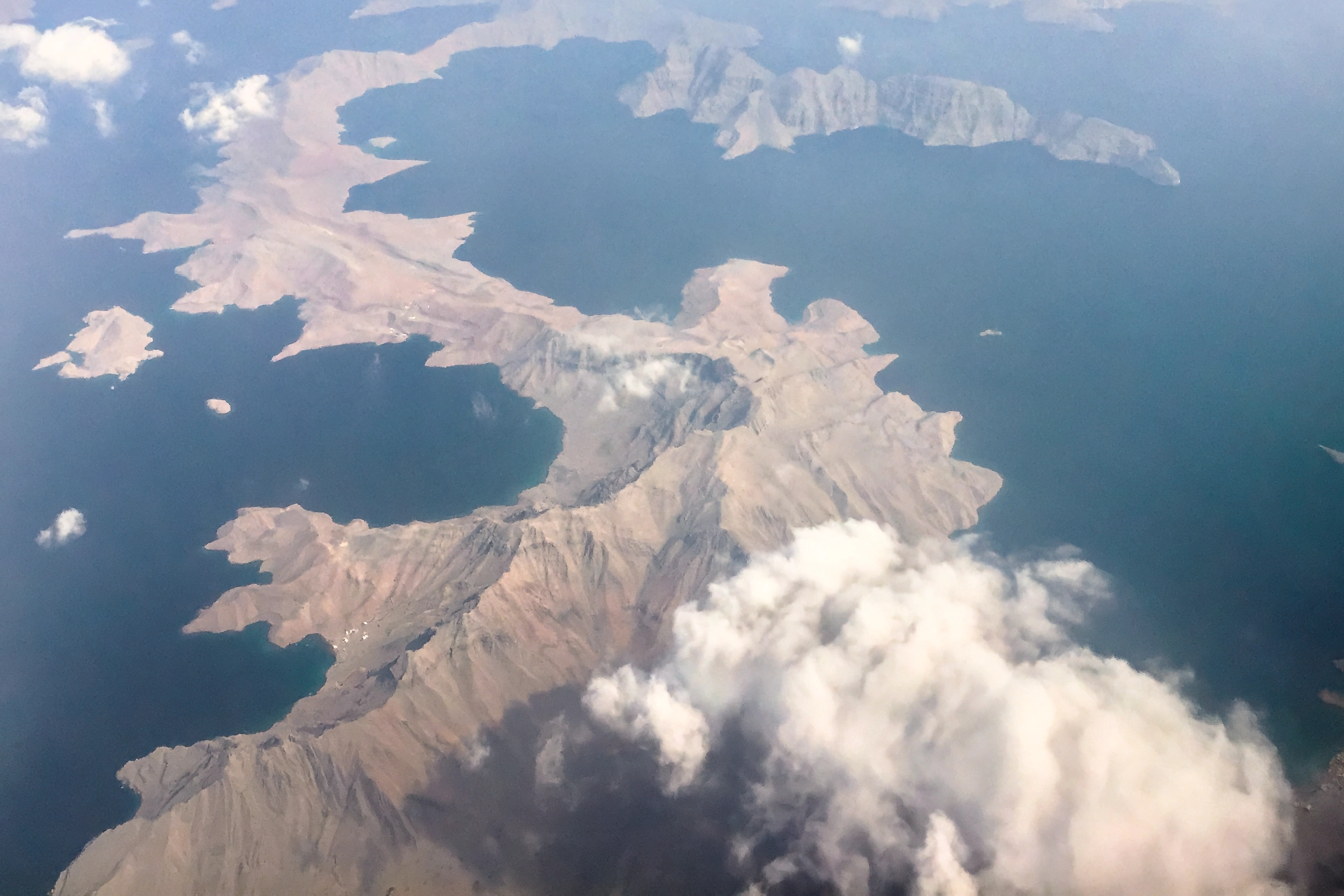
Elphinstone Inlet and Malcolm's Inlet separated by a small strip of land on the Musandam Peninsula could be made into an alternative route from the Strait of Hormuz

By 2025, around 15 million barrels (2.4 million cubic metres) of oil per day were transported through the strait. Onshore pipelines have a maximum capacity of around 3 million barrels. All LNG must be transported by ship through the strait.

In June 2012, Saudi Arabia reopened the Iraq Pipeline through Saudi Arabia (IPSA), which was confiscated from Iraq in 2001 and travels from Iraq across Saudi Arabia to a Red Sea port. It has a capacity of 1.65 million barrels (262,000 m^{3}) per day.

In July 2012, the UAE began using the new Habshan–Fujairah oil pipeline from the Habshan fields in Abu Dhabi to the Fujairah oil terminal on the Gulf of Oman, effectively bypassing the Strait of Hormuz. It has a maximum capacity of around 2 million barrels (320,000 m^{3}) per day, over three-quarters of the UAE's 2012 production rate. The UAE is also increasing Fujairah's storage and off-loading capacities.

The UAE is building the world's largest crude oil storage facility in Fujairah with a capacity of holding 14 million barrels (2,200,000 m^{3}) to enhance Fujairah's growth as a global oil and trading hub. The Habshan – Fujairah route secures the UAE's energy security and has the advantage of being a ground oil pipeline transportation which is considered the cheapest form of oil transportation and reduces insurance costs as oil tankers would no longer enter the Persian Gulf.

In a July 2012 Foreign Policy article, Gal Luft compared Iran and the Strait of Hormuz to the Ottoman Empire and the Dardanelles, a choke point for shipments of Russian grain a century ago. He indicated that tensions involving the Strait of Hormuz are leading those currently dependent on shipments from the Persian Gulf to find alternative shipping capabilities. He stated that Saudi Arabia was considering building new pipelines to Oman and Yemen, and that Iraq might revive the disused Iraq–Syria pipeline to transport crude oil to the Mediterranean. Luft stated that reducing Hormuz traffic "presents the West with a new opportunity to augment its current Iran containment strategy."

== See also ==
- Abu Musa island
- Bab el-Mandeb – Strait between Yemen and Djibouti
- Bandar Lengeh – City in Hormozgan province, Iran
- Hormozgān Province – Province of Iran
- Kingdom of Hormuz – Kingdom in the Persian Gulf (11th century – 1622)
  - Portuguese conquest of Hormuz
- Cyrus the Great – Founder of the Achaemenid Empire
- Afonso de Albuquerque
- 2026 Strait of Hormuz campaign
- Kharg Island, further north in the Gulf

== Sources ==
This article incorporates text from a free content work. Licensed under CC BY 4.0 (license statement/permission). Text taken from Global Agrifood Implications of the 2026 Conflict in the Middle East, Impacts on energy and fertilizer trade, and food security. Food and Agriculture Organization of the United Nations.

- Mohammed Kookherdi (1997) Kookherd, an Islamic civil at Mehran river, third edition: Dubai
- [Atlas Gitashenasi Ostanhai Iran] (Gitashenasi Province Atlas of Iran)
- Floor, Willem M. (2006). The Persian Gulf: A Political and Economic History of Five Port Cities, 1500-1730. United States: Mage Publishers. ISBN 978-1-933823-12-6.
