= Habshan–Fujairah oil pipeline =

Oil pipeline in the UAE

Abu Dhabi Crude Oil Pipeline
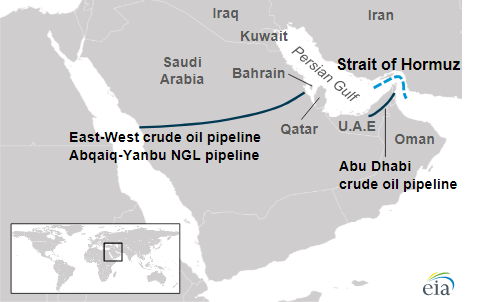
- The Habshan–Fujairah pipeline (right) with Saudi Arabia's East–West Crude Oil Pipeline (left)

Location
- Country: United Arab Emirates
- Province: Abu Dhabi, Fujairah
- Direction: North–South
- Start: Habshan
- Passes through: Sweihan
- To: Fujairah

General information
- Type: oil
- Owner: Mubadala Investment Company
- Contractors: China Petroleum Engineering and Construction Corporation
- Construction started: 2008
- Commissioned: 2012

Technical information
- Length: 406 km (252 mi)
- Maximum discharge: 1.5 million barrels per day (~7.5×10^{7} t/a)
- Diameter: 48 in (1,219 mm)
- No. of pumping stations: 3
- Pumping stations: Habshan, Sweihan, Fujairah

Habshan–Fujairah oil pipeline, also known as "Abu Dhabi Crude Oil Pipeline (ADCOP)", is an oil pipeline in the United Arab Emirates. It starts from the Habshan onshore field in Abu Dhabi and runs to Fujairah on the Gulf of Oman.

== History ==
The pipeline was ordered by the International Petroleum Investment Company as a strategic instrument in order to increase the security of supply, and reduce dependence on oil transportation through the Strait of Hormuz. The conceptual design of the pipeline was completed in 2006 by Tebodin. In 2007, construction related contracts were awarded. The EPC contract for the project was awarded to China Petroleum Engineering and Construction Corporation and China Petroleum Pipeline Bureau, both subsidiaries of the China National Petroleum Corporation.

Construction of the pipeline started in March 2008. It was completed in March 2011. Its commissioning was postponed several times and it became operational in June 2012. The pipeline was inaugurated on 15 July 2012 when it made its first delivery of Murban crude to the Pak-Arab Refinery.

== Technical description ==
The 48-inch (1.2 m) pipeline is 406 kilometres (252 mi) long, of which 14 kilometres (8.7 mi) is an offshore section. It passes east of Abu Dhabi city, through Sweihan and west of Al Ain. The pipeline has a capacity of 1.5 million barrels per day (~7.5×10^{7} t/a). It cost $3.3 billion.

The pipeline is designated to supply the refinery in Fujairah and the Fujairah export terminal.

== Contractors ==
The conceptual design of the pipeline was done by Tebodin Consultants & Engineers. front-end engineering design was delivered by WorleyParsons. Penspen delivered detailed design and engineering, and project and construction management assistance. The environmental impact assessment was carried out by URS Corporation, the topographical survey by Maps Geosystems, and the geotechnical survey by Fugro Middle East and the Arab Centre for Engineering Studies.

ILF Consulting Engineers were appointed as Project Management Consultants. EPC was carried out by China Petroleum Engineering and Construction Corporation. Around 13 kilometres (8.1 mi) of offshore pipelines were installed by Van Oord Offshore.

Oil tanks at the Fujairah terminal were constructed by Italy's Belleli Energy. The mooring system was provided by Bluewater Energy Services. An integrated electrical system for the pipeline was designed and supplied by ABB. Siemens, together with 3W Networks designed and undertook the complete engineering, procurement and construction of the integrated control and safety systems and telecom scope.

Pipes were supplied by Sumitomo, Salzgitter AG and Jindal Saw. The technical assurance, risk and safety, asset management, and industrial inspection were done by Germanischer Lloyd. After the commissioning, Siemens provides maintenance services for the automation, control and telecom systems.

== West-East Pipeline ==
On 15 May 2026, the Abu Dhabi National Oil Company (ADNOC) announced a new pipeline named "West-East 1" that would run parallel to the existing one. The UAE was reported to have fast-tracked the project in order to export more oil from the Fujairah port, bypassing the Strait of Hormuz, that had been closed during the Iran war. The new pipeline would double the export capacity, and would be operational by 2027.
