= Habshan =

Oil field in the United Arab Emirates

Coordinates: 23°49′30″N 53°37′0″E

Habshan is an area in the southwestern part of the Emirate of Abu Dhabi in the United Arab Emirates.

== History ==
It is currently a major oil and gas field for the Abu Dhabi National Oil Company (ADNOC). It contains oil field and camps for oil workers. The major part of this region is marked as a Red Zone due to the presence of hydrogen sulphide gas.

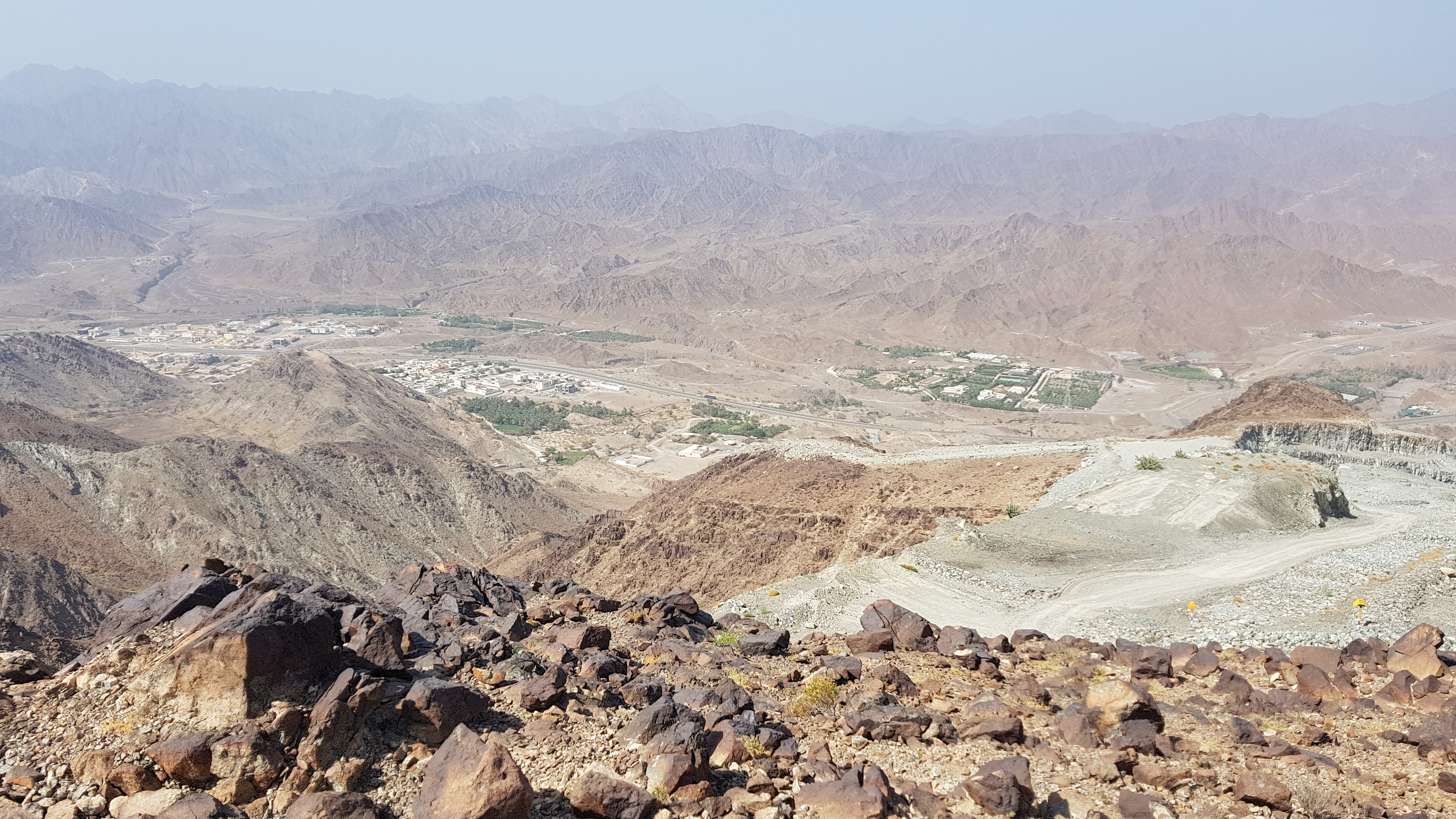
View of the Wadi Ham from the top of the Habshan Pipeline cutting

The area is a major production area for sulphur, a byproduct of the oil industry, and is the terminal station of a new railway network in the United Arab Emirates developed by Etihad Rail. Commercial operations on this railway commenced in December 2015.

The gas facility was damaged by falling debris of an intercepted aerial vehicle on 3 April 2026 during the 2026 Iran War.

== see also ==
- Habshan–Fujairah oil pipeline
- HABSHAN BIN NOUSHAD
