= Pakistan Refinery Limited =

Pakistani oil refinery

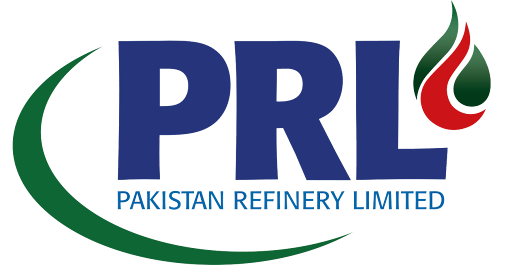
- Trade name: PSX: PRL; KSE 100 component KSE 30 component
- Native name: پالایشگاه پاکستان محدود
- Type: Public
- Industry: Petroleum
- Founded: 1960; 66 years ago in Karachi, Pakistan
- Headquarters: Karachi, Pakistan
- Area served: Pakistan
- Key people: Zahid Mir (CEO)
- Revenue: ▲ Rs. 310.351 billion (US$1.1 billion) (2025)
- Operating income: ▼ Rs. −0.176 billion (US$−630,000) (2025)
- Net income: ▼ Rs. −4.659 billion (US$−17 million) (2025)
- Total assets: ▼ Rs. 107.940 billion (US$390 million) (2025)
- Total equity: ▼ Rs. 26.604 billion (US$95 million) (2025)
- Owner: Pakistan State Oil (63.56%)
- Number of employees: 285 (2025)
- Parent: Pakistan State Oil
- Subsidiaries: Pak Grease Manufacturing Company Limited (27.26%)
- Website: prl.com.pk
- Footnotes; Financials as of 30 June 2025

Pakistan Refinery Limited (PRL) is a Pakistani oil refinery based in Karachi. It is listed on the Pakistan Stock Exchange.

== History ==
In the late 1950s, following Pakistan's independence, the Soviet Union offered to assist the country in constructing an oil refinery on the condition that the facility would process only crude oil imported from the Soviet Union. In response, the Government of Pakistan approached private sector companies operating in the country and proposed a joint venture to construct a refinery in Karachi. The private companies accepted the government's proposal as an alternative to the Soviet offer.

In September 1959, the government concluded an agreement with a consortium of four oil companies, Burmah Oil Company, California Texas Oil Corporation, The Shell Petroleum Company, and Standard Vacuum Oil Company, for the construction of an oil refinery at Korangi, Karachi. Pakistan Refinery Limited was incorporated as a public limited company in May 1960, and the construction contract was subsequently awarded to M.W. Kellogg Group of Companies to build a refinery at a cost of about $35 million. The consortium of four oil companies subscribed to 60 percent of the shares of the refining company, while the remaining 40 percent was subscribed by private investors, following an initial public offering on the Karachi Stock Exchange.

In 1964, Pakistan Refinery began its operations and it was inaugurated by then President Ayub Khan. The refinery was initially designed with a capacity of 1 million tons of crude oil per annum, which was later expanded to 2.1 million tons per annum.

In 2014, Pakistan Refinery awarded a contract to Honeywell's UOP to provide a Penex isomerization unit, intended to convert naphtha feedstock into isomerate for higher-octane motor gasoline production. The unit was commissioned in 2016, doubling PRL's output of high-quality gasoline to 24,000 metric tons per month.

In June 2015, Pakistan State Oil acquired Shell Pakistan's stake in Pakistan Refinery.

In October 2023, United Energy Group (UEG) at the Belt and Road Forum in Beijing agreed to invest US$1.5 billion in the project of Pakistan Refinery. Under the proposed arrangement, PSO agreed to sell more than 30 percent of its shareholding in PRL to UEG in exchange for the capital injection. In the same month, PRL also signed a long-term crude oil supply agreement with a Russian counterpart on the sidelines of the Russian Energy Forum.

== Operations ==
Pakistan Refinery Limited operates a hydro-skimming refinery designed to process imported and indigenous crude oil, with a capacity of approximately 50,000 barrels per day or 2.1 million metric tons per annum. The company operates at two locations in Karachi, the main processing facility at Korangi Creek and a supporting crude berthing and storage facility at Keamari. Imported crude oil is delivered by PNSC-owned or chartered tankers to the Keamari terminal, from where it is transferred to the Korangi processing facility.

The refinery's processing units include a crude desalter, a crude distillation unit, a hydrodesulfurization unit, a platforming unit, an isomerization unit, an LPG recovery unit, steam and power generation units, an effluent water treatment unit and a water softening unit. It produces motor gasoline, high-speed diesel, furnace oil, jet fuel (JP-1 and JP-8), kerosene, naphtha and liquefied petroleum gas.

== See also ==
- List of oil refineries
