= China Petroleum Engineering and Construction Corporation =

Chinese national engineering corporation

The China Petroleum Engineering and Construction Corporation is a construction engineering company that builds refineries, pipelines, and other oil and gas related infrastructure. It is a subsidiary of the China National Petroleum Corporation.

== Projects ==
- United Arab Emirates The US$3.29 billion Habshan–Fujairah oil pipeline was built with China Petroleum Pipeline Bureau, another subsidiary of CNPC. The construction work was carried out from March 2008 to March 2011. The pipeline extends from Habshan, Abu Dhabi to Fujairah and has a capacity of 1.5 million-barrel-per-day.
