= Pakistan State Oil =

Pakistani state-owned oil company

Pakistan State Oil (PSO)

- Headquarters of the Pakistan State Oil in Karachi
- Native name: نفت دولت پاکستان
- Type: Public
- Traded as: PSX: PSO; KSE 100 component KSE 30 component
- Industry: Oil and gas
- Predecessors: National Oil; Dawood Petroleum Limited; Premier Oil Company Limited; State Oil Company Limited
- Founded: 1 January 1974; 30 December 1976 (as PSO)
- Headquarters: Karachi, Pakistan
- Area served: Pakistan
- Key people: Asif Baigmohamed (Chairman); Jawwad Ahmed Cheema (CEO)
- Products: Motor gasoline (Mogas), high-speed Diesel (HSD), furnace oil (FO), jet fuel (JP-1), kerosene oil, Compressed natural gas (CNG), petrochemicals and lubricants
- Revenue: ▲ Rs. 3.39 trillion (US$12 billion) (2023)
- Operating income: ▼ Rs. 24.36 billion (US$87 million) (2023)
- Net income: ▼ Rs. 5.66 billion (US$20 million) (2023)
- Total assets: ▲ Rs. 983.39 billion (US$3.5 billion) (2023)
- Total equity: ▲ Rs. 216.56 billion (US$770 million) (2023)
- Number of employees: 2,222 (2023)
- Parent: Government of Pakistan (22.47%)
- Subsidiaries: PSO Venture Capital; PSO Renewable Energy; Cerisma; Pakistan Refinery Limited (63.56%); Asia Petroleum Limited (49%); Pak-Grease Co. Limited (22%)
- Website: psopk.com

Pakistan State Oil is a state-owned company in Pakistan that buys, stores and sells petroleum products and lubricants and imports liquefied natural gas (LNG). It is headquartered in Karachi and is the largest fuel marketing company of Pakistan.

== History ==
=== Background ===
Pakistan National Oil Ltd (PNO), a wholly Pakistani-owned importer and distributor of petroleum products, was formed in 1961, as a local counterpart to the foreign marketers Esso and Shell. PNO was not state-owned. It belonged to the Amin group, who also founded National Refinery Limited. A second Pakistani marketer, Dawood Petroleum, was set up in 1967 and was controlled by the Dawood Group. On 1 January 1974, the government nationalised both companies under a new ordinance on petroleum marketing but left the foreign-owned firms in private hands. Dawood Petroleum was renamed Premier Oil Company.

=== 1974–1976: State Oil Company ===
On 3 June 1974, the government set up a state enterprise in Karachi, the Petroleum Storage and Development Corporation. It was later renamed State Oil Company.

Esso asked the government to buy its refining and marketing interests in Pakistan, and in 1976 they were purchased from Esso Eastern and transferred to State Oil. Under the deal, Esso was to reinvest the money in the Mari gas field. State Oil also acquired Esso Eastern's 18 percent stake in Pakistan Refinery.

=== 1976–present: Pakistan State Oil ===
In December 1976, PNO and Premier Oil were merged into State Oil, and the combined company took the name Pakistan State Oil Company. The merged company controlled about 60 percent of oil storage, distribution and marketing in Pakistan. It held the Castrol lubricants franchise and, with Air Total International, provided aviation services to foreign airlines.In 1977, it was listed on the Karachi Stock Exchange.

PSO entered the Fortune International 500 ranking of the largest industrial companies outside the United States in 1984, at No. 463. Finance minister Mahbub ul Haq announced a plan to sell part of the government's holdings in PSO and five other state companies through the stock market from March 1986, but the plan did not go ahead. In 1992, PSO agreed to supply 1.8 million tonnes of fuel oil a year to a 1,292-megawatt oil-fired power plant planned near the Hub River.

PSO's retail network grew by 200 to 250 outlets a year under Tariq Kirmani, who was managing director until 2005. In October 2002, the government, which owned 54 percent of PSO, said it would sell 51 percent to a strategic investor. The bidding was postponed repeatedly, in part because of the Iraq War. In July 2007, the Supreme Court ordered the sale delayed in a case over bidder eligibility, and a National Assembly committee and the military opposed it on security grounds. PSO was removed from the privatisation programme in 2019.

In January 2015, a ten-day petrol shortage led the government to suspend PSO's acting managing director and, later, four other senior officials. Between 2005 and 2015, PSO went through seven chief executives, including acting ones. In February 2016, PSO signed a 15-year agreement with Qatargas to import 3.75 million tonnes of LNG a year, priced at 13.37 percent of the Brent oil price. In February 2021, it signed a ten-year deal with Qatar Petroleum for up to 3 million tonnes a year. The National Accountability Bureau (NAB) said in 2018 that Sheikh Imranul Haque, a former managing director, had been appointed illegally and through favouritism. NAB took him into custody in August 2019 in an inquiry into the award of an LNG terminal contract. In 2023, PSO inaugurated an aircraft re-fueling facility at Skardu International Airport.

Syed Taha was managing director from February 2020 until 2026, when he was appointed chief executive of K-Electric. Unpaid bills, largely owed by Sui Northern Gas Pipelines Limited for LNG, raised PSO's receivables to a record Rs755 billion in October 2023. Qatari LNG deliveries were suspended from March 2026, when QatarEnergy invoked force majeure after its facilities were attacked.

== Operations ==
PSO's head office is PSO House in Clifton, Karachi. It is Pakistan's largest oil marketing company. It had 3,528 retail outlets in 2023 and supplies about 99 percent of the country's jet fuel. Its sells its lubricants under the Carient name. PSO holds Pakistan's two long-term LNG contracts with QatarEnergy on the government's behalf.

== See also ==
- Petroleum industry in Pakistan
- List of largest companies in Pakistan
