= Pak-Arab Refinery =

Energy company in Pakistan

Pak Arab Refinery Company
- Type: Unlisted public company
- Industry: Refinery
- Founded: 1974
- Headquarters: Karachi-75190, Pakistan
- Key people: Irteza Ali Qureshi (managing director)
- Products: Oil, high speed diesel, kerosene oil, and petroleum distillates
- Revenue: ▲ Rs. 956.040 billion (US$3.4 billion) (2023)
- Operating income: ▼ Rs. 114.336 billion (US$410 million) (2023)
- Net income: ▼ Rs. 66.596 billion (US$240 million) (2023)
- Total assets: ▲ Rs. 381.433 billion (US$1.4 billion) (2023)
- Total equity: ▲ Rs. 173.283 billion (US$620 million) (2023)
- Owner: Government of Pakistan (60%); Mubadala Investment Company (40%)
- Subsidiaries: Total Parco; PARCO Coastal Refinery
- Website: parco.com.pk
- Footnotes; Financials as of 30 June 2023

Pak-Arab Refinery Company Limited (PARCO) (Urdu: پاک عرب ریفائنری) is a Pakistani oil and gas company active in refining, transporting and marketing petroleum products. It is a joint-venture between governments of Pakistan and Abu Dhabi.

== History ==
PARCO, a joint venture between Government of Pakistan and the Emirate of Abu Dhabi was incorporated as a public limited company in 1974. The Government of Pakistan holds 60% of the share holding while 40% of the shares are held by Emirate of Abu Dhabi.

In 2010, the company set up a Diesel Hydro Desulfurization Unit to ensure that Diesel produced by the refinery meets international Euro-II standards. In bitumen, PARCO commissioned a 500 t d Biturox oxidation unit at its Mehmood Kot refinery in 2012.

In September 2012, Pak-Arab Refinery completed its first acquisition by acquiring 100% shareholding of SHV Energy Pakistan, which prior to the acquisition was Pakistan's largest LPG marketing company and PARCO's strategic partner since 2001. On 12 April 2017, the company announced that it will use technologies from Honeywell to upgrade its refinery near Multan, Pakistan to produce cleaner-burning fuels.

In 2019, Pak-Arab Refinery announced to build its coastal refinery project near Hub, Balochistan, which would have a capacity of 250,000 barrels per day with an estimated cost of over $ 5 billion.

== Subsidiaries ==
=== PARCO Gunvor ===
PARCO Gunvor Limited was founded in late 2002 as Total PARCO Pakistan Limited, a joint venture between Pak-Arab Refinery Limited (PARCO) and TotalEnergies, and began retail operations the following year.

In 2009, a lubricant-blending plant with a capacity of 50,000 tons per year became operational at Port Qasim, Karachi, under its subsidiary Total Atlas Lubricants Pakistan, a joint venture with the Atlas Group that was originally formed in 1997.

In 2013, Total PARCO acquired 438 petrol stations from Chevron Pakistan. Later, Total Parco re-branded the former Caltex outlets over a period of approximately 18 months.

In 2024, TotalEnergies exited Pakistan and sold its 50 percent stake in Total PARCO to Gunvor, following which the company was renamed PARCO Gunvor Limited.

As of 2024, PARCO Gunvor operates more than 800 multi-product service stations offering motor gasoline, diesel, compressed natural gas (CNG), and lubricants. These operations are supported by a network of depots and coastal terminals, as well as integration with PARCO’s approximately 2,000-kilometre pipeline system.

== Board of directors ==
- Anees Shakeel from Sindh
- Abdul Hadi Shah from Khyber Pakhtunkhwa
- Bushra Naz Malik from Punjab
- Syed Aoun Raza Rizvi overseas

== See also ==
- List of oil refineries
- Pakistan Refinery Limited
- Attock Refinery Limited
- National Refinery Limited
- Byco
