= Nishat Chunian =

Pakistani textile company

Nishat Chunian Limited
- Company type: Public
- Traded as: PSX: NCL; KSE 100 component
- Industry: Textile
- Founded: 1990
- Founder: Shahzad Saleem
- Headquarters: Lahore, Pakistan
- Key people: Shahzad Saleem (Chairman)
- Revenue: ▲ Rs. 88.879 billion (US$320 million) (2024)
- Operating income: ▲ Rs. 8.997 billion (US$32 million) (2024)
- Net income: ▲ Rs. 691.671 million (US$2.5 million) (2024)
- Total assets: ▼ Rs. 68.803 billion (US$250 million) (2024)
- Total equity: ▲ Rs. 21.399 billion (US$77 million) (2024)
- Owner: Shahzad Saleem (22.95%); Nishat Mills (13.61%)
- Number of employees: 7,331 (2024)
- Subsidiaries: The Linen Company; Nishat Chunian USA Inc.; Sweave Inc.; Nishat Chunian Properties Limited; T L C Middle East Trading L.L.C
- Website: nishat.net
- Footnotes / references Financials as of 30 June 2024

Nishat Chunian Limited (Urdu pronunciation: [nɪˈʃaːt tʃuːˈnɪ.jən] nih-SHAHT choo-NIH-yuhn) is a Pakistani vertically integrated textile company based in Lahore. It is listed on the Pakistan Stock Exchange and is one of the largest textile company of Pakistan.

Nishat Chunian also operates The Linen Company retail stores located in Lahore, Karachi, and Islamabad.

== History ==
Nishat Chunian was incorporated in 1990 as a spinning mill by Shahzad Saleem, a nephew of Mian Muhammad Mansha, as part of Nishat Group. It began commercial operations in March 1991 with a manufacturing facility of 14,400 spindles supplied by Sulzer. The company was also listed on the Karachi Stock Exchange in 1991.

In 1998, Nishat Chunian established a weaving mill. Two years later, another spinning mill was added.

In 2013, Nishat Chunian acquired Taj Textiles for Rs. 350 million.

In 2010, Nishat Chunian established Nishat Chunian Power, a 200MW independent power producer, which is also listed on the Pakistan Stock Exchange.

In 2016, Nishat Chunian opened the first store of The Linen Company in Lahore.

In July 2018, Nishat Chunian divested its shareholding in Nishat Chunian Entertainment.

== Subsidiaries ==
- Nishat Chunian USA Inc.
- Nishat Chunian Electric Corporation Ltd.
- The Linen Company

== Former subsidiaries ==
- Nishat Chunian Power
- Nishat Chunian Entertainment

== Factories ==
Nishat Chunian operates factories in the following cities:

- Kasur
- Raiwind
