= Lal Pir =

Village in Muzaffargarh Dt, Pakistan

Lal Pir or Lalpir (also Laal Pir) is a village near Mehmood Kot, Muzaffargarh District, Punjab, Pakistan. It was destroyed in floods in August 2010 and rebuilt by the efforts of the Midland International Aid Trust, a charity based in Walsall in the Midlands of England. For this reason the tented village erected as emergency accommodation pending the full rebuild was known as "Midland" or "Midlands Village", a name also transferred to the village itself.

Nearby, also in Mehmood Kot, is the site of the Lalpir Power Plant complex. Lal Pir has a railway station on the Sher Shah–Kot Addu Branch Line.
