= DG Cement =

Cement manufacturer in Pakistan

- Native name: ڈی جی سیمنٹ
- Formerly: Dera Ghazi Khan Cement
- Type: Public
- Traded as: PSX: DGKC; KSE 100 component KSE 30 component
- Industry: Cement
- Founded: 1986; 40 years ago
- Headquarters: Lahore, Pakistan
- Key people: Raza Mansha (CEO); Naz Mansha (chairperson)
- Products: DG Cement; Elephant Cement; Hathi Cement; Block Cement
- Revenue: ▲ Rs. 70.495 billion (US$250 million) (2023)
- Operating income: ▲ Rs. 11.044 billion (US$40 million) (2023)
- Net income: ▼ Rs. -3.366 billion (US$−12 million) (2023)
- Total assets: ▲ Rs. 142.246 billion (US$510 million) (2023)
- Total equity: ▼ Rs. 67.142 billion (US$240 million) (2023)
- Owner: Nishat Mills (31.40%); Mian Umer Mansha (6.29%); Mian Hassan Mansha (6.19%)
- Number of employees: 1,881 (2023)
- Parent: Nishat Group
- Subsidiaries: Nishat Paper Products (55%); Nishat Dairy Limited (55.10%)
- Website: dgcement.com
- Footnotes; Financials as of 30 June 2023

DG Cement is a Pakistani building materials company based in Lahore. It is part of Nishat Group.

DG Cement operates three plants located in Khairpur, Chakwal, Dera Ghazi Khan, and Hub, Balochistan.

== History ==
DG Cement was established in 1986 by state-owned company, State Cement Corporation of Pakistan in Dera Ghazi Khan. The plant was supplied by Ube Industries of Japan.

In 1992, DG Cement was acquired for PKR 1,799 million ($73.5 million) by Saigol Group under the privatization scheme of the Government of Pakistan. Later, it was transferred to Nishat Group in a swap scheme in which Nishat Group acquired DG Cement and Saigol Group acquired Maple Leaf Cement from Nishat Group.

In 1994, DG Cement initiated a $170 million expansion project at its Dera Ghazi Khan plant in Punjab. The project was financed in part by the International Finance Corporation (IFC), which approved a $10 million exposure for the facility in 1995. The project contract was awarded to FLSmidth and was denominated in Danish kroner.

In 2004, DG Cement commissioned its second plant in Khairpur, Chakwal at a cost of PKR 9 billion.

In 2015, DG Khan setup its third and one of the largest plant of Pakistan in Hub, Balochistan.

== Plants ==
- Hub
- Khairpur, Chakwal
- DG Khan

== Subsidiaries ==
=== Nishat Paper Products ===
Nishat Paper Products was founded in June 2004 as a joint venture between DG Cement and Shuaiba Paper Products of Kuwait to produce paper sacks for cement.

In June 2008, Shuaiba Paper divested its stake. The plant is located in Khairpur, Chakwal and has a capacity to produce 120 million bags annually.

=== Nishat Dairy ===
Nishat Dairy Limited was founded in 2011 as a subsidiary of DG Cement. It operates a 165-acre dairy farm located in Sukheke Mandi.

== Investments ==
- Hyundai Nishat Motors (10%)
- MCB Bank (8.63%)
- Nishat Mills (8.61%)
- Nishat Hotels and Properties Limited (8.55%)
- Adamjee Insurance (7.97%)

== Shareholding pattern ==
Shareholders	% of Shareholding
Nishat Mills Limited	31.40
Mian Umer Mansha	6.29
Mian Hassan Mansha	6.19
Last updated: December 2023
