= Hyundai Nishat Motors =

Pakistani automobile manufacturer

Hyundai Nishat Motor
- Type: Unlisted public
- Industry: Automotive
- Founded: 2017; 9 years ago
- Headquarters: Lahore and Faisalabad in Pakistan
- Area served: Pakistan
- Key people: Hassan Mansha (CEO)
- Products: Automobiles
- Revenue: ▲ Rs. 66.260 billion (US$240 million) (2024)
- Operating income: ▼ Rs. 2.332 billion (US$8.3 million) (2024)
- Net income: ▲ Rs. 1.626 billion (US$5.8 million) (2024)
- Total assets: ▲ Rs. 50.778 billion (US$180 million) (2024)
- Total equity: ▲ Rs. 20.893 billion (US$75 million) (2024)
- Owner: Sojitz (40%); Millat Tractors (15.86%); Adamjee Insurance (10%); DG Cement (10%); Nishat Mills (10%); Security General Insurance (10%)
- Parent: Nishat Group
- Website: hyundai-nishat.com
- Footnotes; Financials as of 31 December 2024

Hyundai Nishat Motors (Urdu: ہیونڈے نشاط) is a Pakistani automobile manufacturer based in Lahore. It is part of the Nishat Group.

Hyundai Nishat is the authorized assembler and manufacturer of Hyundai vehicles in Pakistan and began production at its Faisalabad plant in 2019.

== History ==
Hyundai Nishat was founded in 2017 as a joint venture between the Nishat Group, Sojitz, and Millat Tractors. Previously, Hyundai assembled cars in Pakistan until 2004, when its local partner Dewan Farooque Motors went bankrupt.

Hyundai Nishat Motors signed an investment agreement with the Ministry of Industries and Production under the Automotive Development Policy 2016-21.

Hyundai Nishat Motor launched the Elantra sedan in March 2021.

Hyundai Nishat Motor launched Santa Fe mid-size SUV.

== Products ==
=== Locally manufactured ===
- Hyundai Elantra (sedan)
- Hyundai Sonata (luxury sedan)
- Hyundai Tucson (compact crossover SUV)
- Hyundai Santa Fe (crossover SUV)
- Hyundai Porter H-100 (light commercial vehicle/light truck)
- Hyundai Palisade (mid-size crossover SUV)

=== Imported ===
- Hyundai Ioniq 5
- Hyundai Ioniq 6

=== Discontinued ===
- Hyundai Santro (city car)
- Hyundai Shehzore (light truck)
- Hyundai Staria (minivan)

== See also ==
- Automotive industry in Pakistan
