= List of Pakistanis by net worth =

The following is a list of the Pakistani people sorted by order of their declared or estimated wealth in U.S. dollars.

== Pakistanis by net worth ==
Rank	Name	Net worth (USD)	As of	Source(s) of wealth	Ref(s)
1	Shahid Khan	$16.5 billion	2026	Jacksonville Jaguars, Fulham F.C., Flex-N-Gate LLC, Toronto Four Seasons, All Elite Wrestling	
2	Hussain Dawood	$5.5 billion	2026	Dawood Hercules Corporation Limited	
3	Mian Muhammad Mansha	$5 billion	2026	Nishat Group, Nishat Hotels, Nishat Hyundai Motors Plant in Faisalabad, MCB Bank, DG Khan Cement, owner of Emporium Mall, Adamjee Group, Nishat Chunian Group Textile Mills	
4	Anwar Pervez	$4 billion	2026	Bestway Group, Bestway Cement	
5	Sualeh Asif	$2.4 billion	2026	Cursor, Anysphere	
6	Mamoon Hamid	$2.2 Billion	2026	Managing Partner at Kleiner Perkins	
7	Zameer Choudrey	$2 Billion	2026	Group Chief Executive of Bestway Group	
8	Nosherwan Ali Chaudhry	$1.8 Billion	2026	Chaudhry Group Of Companies	
9	Tayyab Khawaja	$1.6 Billion	2026	Khawaja Group	
