= St James's Hotel and Club =

Hotel in London

Coordinates: 51°30′22″N 0°8′25″W

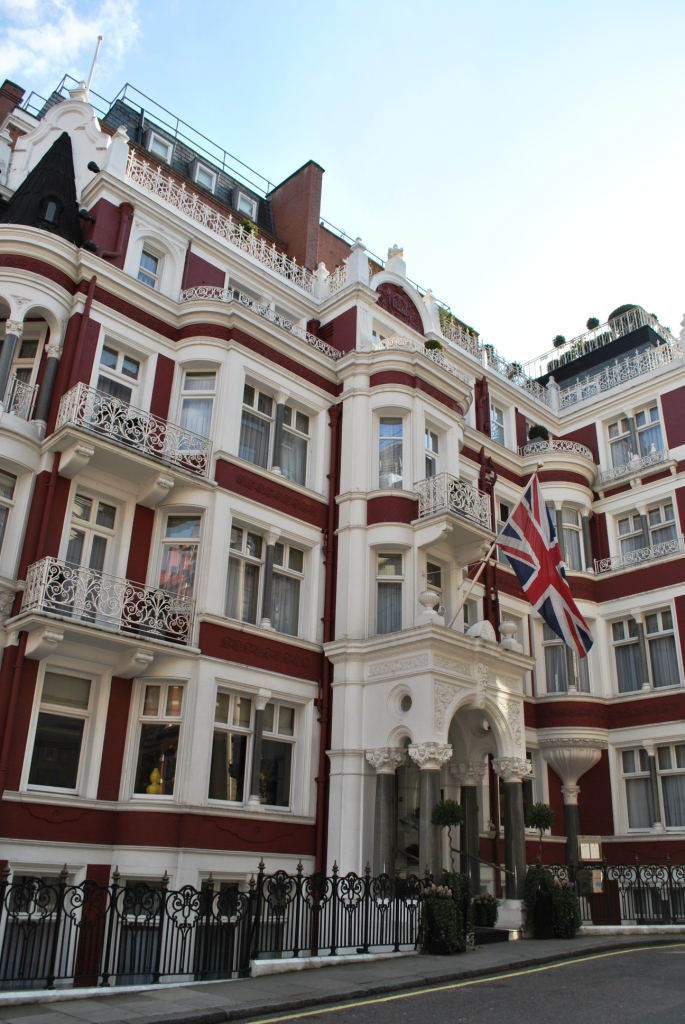

General information
- Type: Luxury hotel
- Location: 7-8 Park Place; London, England
- Completed: 1892 (as a mansion block)
- Opened: 2008 (as a hotel)
- Owner: Nishat Group
- Operator: Althoff Hotels
- Affiliation: Leading Hotels of the World

Technical details
- Floor count: 7

Other information
- Number of rooms: 50
- Number of suites: 10

Website
- stjameshotelandclub.com

St James's Hotel and Club is a luxury hotel at 7-8 Park Place in the St James's district of London, England. It is part of the Nishat Group, a Pakistani multinational conglomerate owned by Mian Mohammad Mansha.

The hotel has fifty rooms and ten suites, many of which have their own terraces. There is also a penthouse with a private balcony.

== History ==
The current hotel describes itself as having "first opened its doors, as a gentlemen's chamber for the English aristocracy, in 1892". At that time, the original St James's Club was elsewhere, and the buildings at 7-8 Park Place were constructed as blocks of flats in 1891–92. They were originally planned with forty-four sets of residential chambers, plus service rooms. The sporting Sir John Dugdale Astley, 3rd Baronet, died in his chambers at 7 Park Place on 10 October 1894.

Before the building's construction, a club known as the Field Club operated at the 7 Park Place address in 1889. On 13 May of that year, police raided the club and found baccarat in progress. Twenty-one persons were arrested, "among whom were three English and several French and Belgian noblemen..." Among those arrested were the Earl of Dudley (later Governor-General of Australia), William Brownlow, 3rd Baron Lurgan, son of Charles Brownlow, 2nd Baron Lurgan, 'Lord Paulet' (probably a son of the 15th Marquess of Winchester) and Baron Ferraro.

By 1960, the 7-8 Park Place flats were being called Old St James's House, a name apparently without historical support. In the spring of 2008, following extensive renovation, the property was reopened as St James's Hotel and Club. Within the hotel is the renovated and repurposed space called the St James's Club, which was founded by Peter de Savary and marketed to resonate with the panache associated with the historic St James's Club established in 1857 by the Earl Granville and the Marchese d'Azeglio.

On 5 November 2010, the Pakistani Nishat Group bought the hotel for £60 million. The staff of the hotel received the Olympic torch on the day before the opening of the 2012 Summer Olympics.
