= Hyundai Porter =

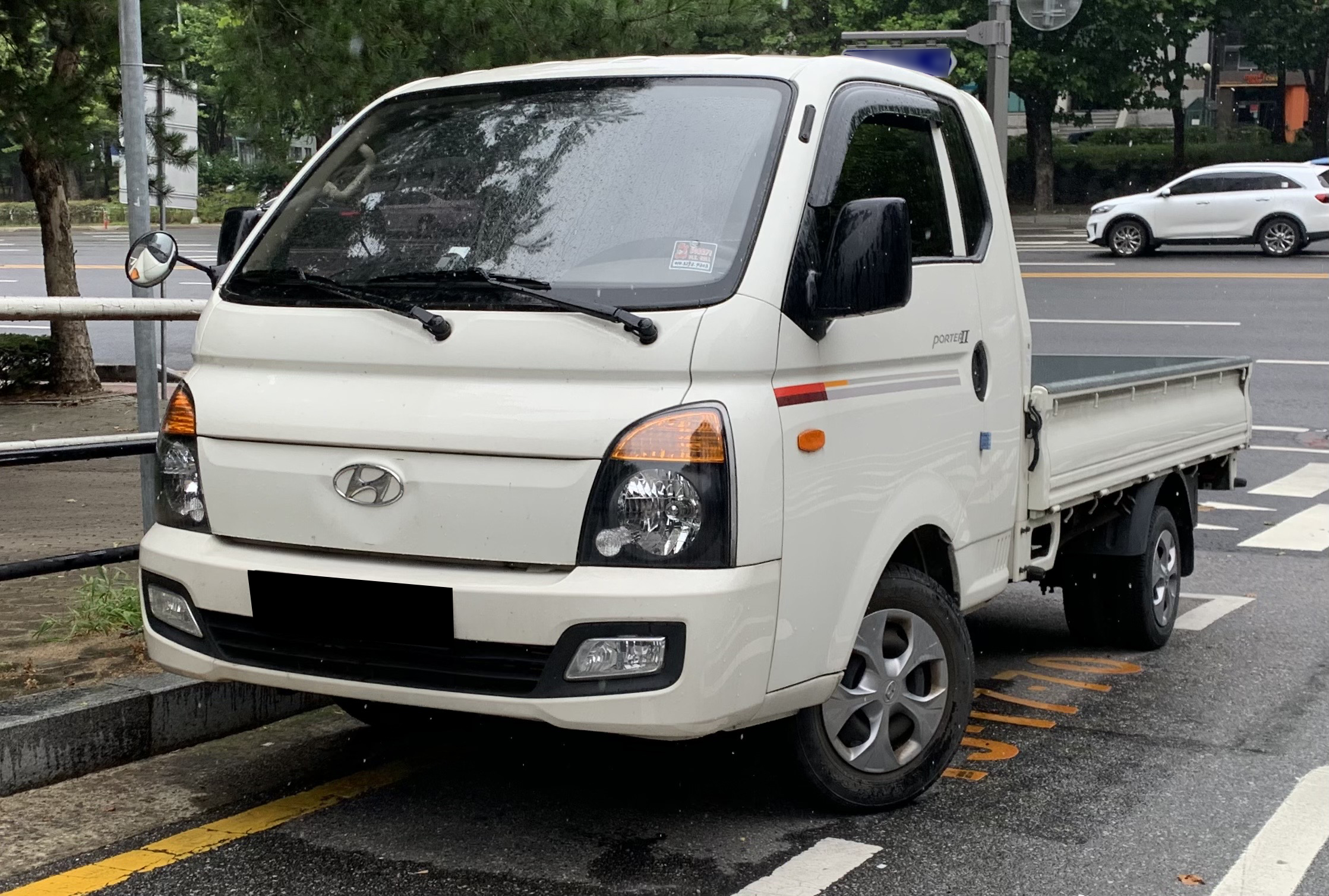

Overview
- Manufacturer: Hyundai; Mitsubishi (second generation only)
- Also called: Hyundai H-100; Farizon E200S (China)
- Production: 1977–present
- Model years: 1977–1981; 1986–present
- Assembly: Ulsan, South Korea (Ulsan Plant 4); Santa Rosa, Philippines; Ninh Bình, Vietnam (HTMV); Bekasi, Indonesia (HIM); Kulim, Malaysia (Inokom); Faisalabad, Pakistan (Hyundai Nishat); Taganrog, Russia (TagAZ); Hsinchu, Taiwan (SYM Motors)

Body and chassis
- Layout: FR layout F4 layout
- Related: Kia Bongo

The Hyundai Porter (Korean: 현대 포터), also known as the Hyundai H-100, is a cabover Pickup truck produced by the South Korean manufacturer Hyundai since 1977.

== History ==
=== First generation (1977–1981) ===
The first generation, launched in March 1977, was called the Hyundai HD1000 and was available as a truck or as a minibus (3 and 12-seater van, ambulance, introduced in January 1978). The truck was marketed as the Porter. It used the chassis of the first generation Ford Transit, but with locally developed, angular bodywork reminiscent of Japanese commercial vehicles from the period. The HD1000 was discontinued in 1981, subsequent to a government imposed rationalization drive; Hyundai was only allowed to build passenger automobiles as a result. The first generation used the Perkins 4.108 diesel engine, displacing 1,759 cc (1.8 L) and producing 55 PS (40 kW).

=== Second generation (1986–1996) ===
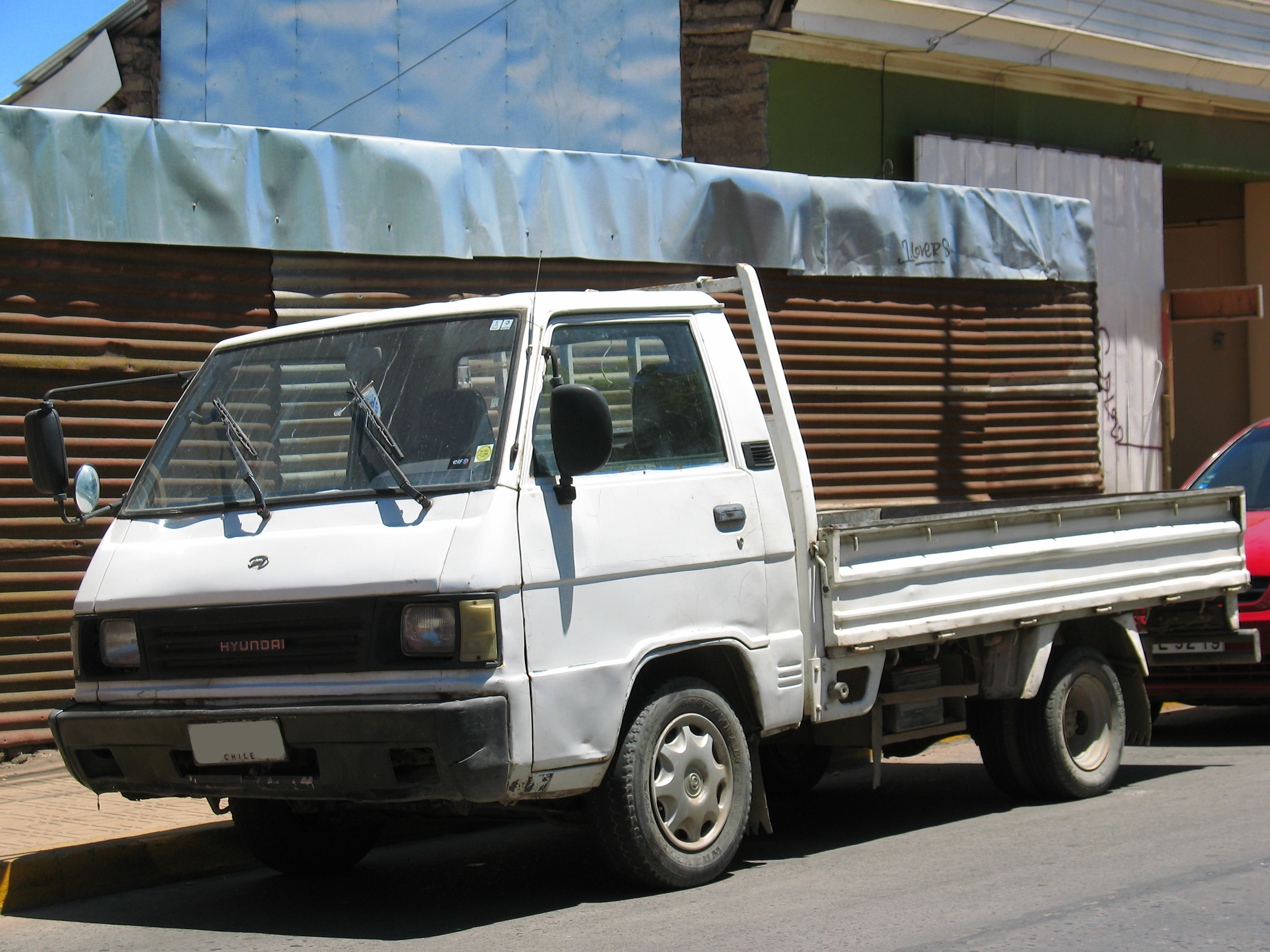
1986–1993 Hyundai Porter

In November 1986, Hyundai revived the label with the introduction of the second generation Porter, which was now a rebadged licensed second generation Mitsubishi Delica (L300). While the third generation Delica was also built by Hyundai, it was known as the Grace and was marketed only as a van, in parallel with the Porter truck range. It was built with the following body styles: 2-door truck, 4-door truck, 3-door van and 4-door van.

==== Upgrade ====
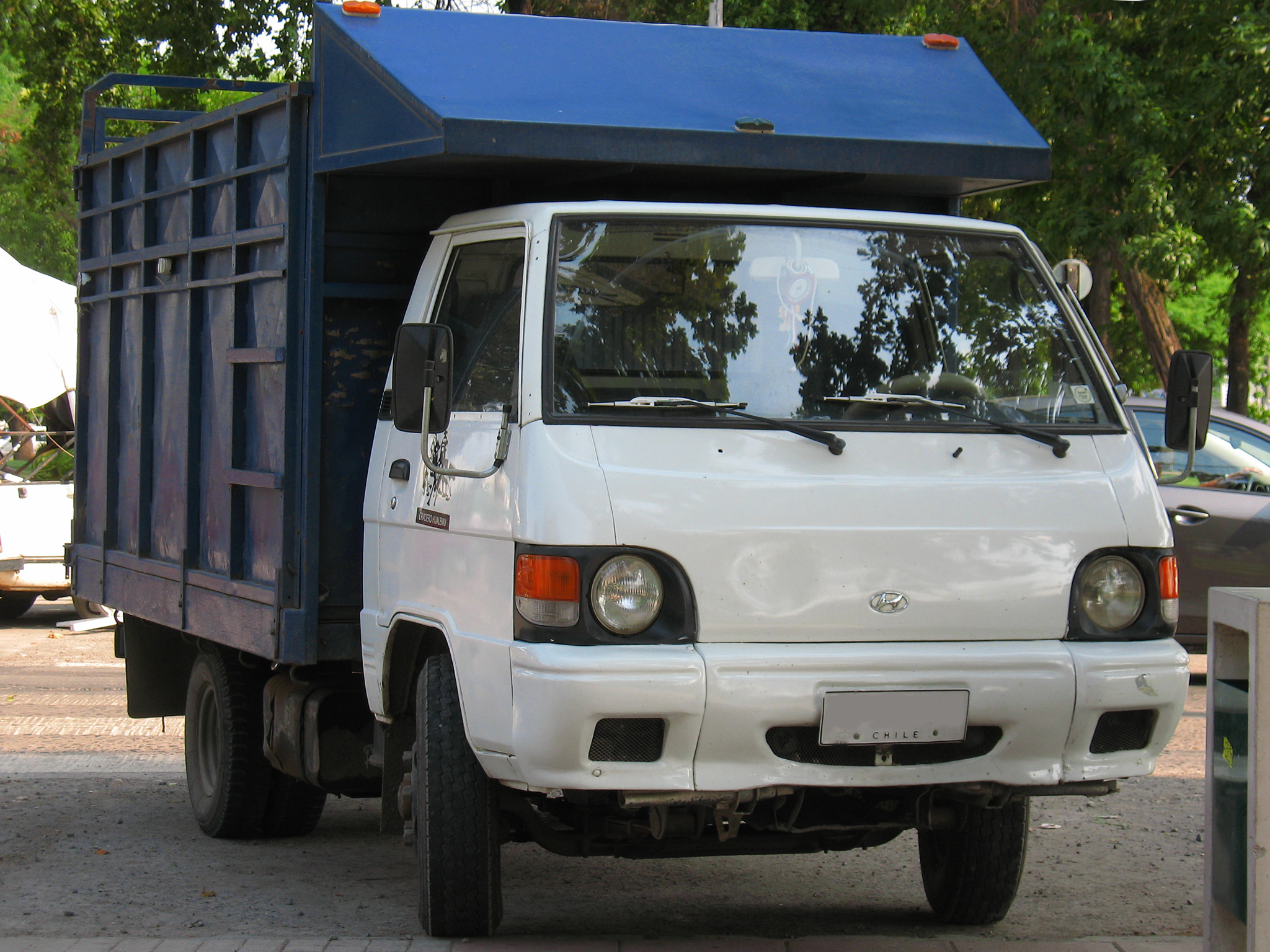
1993–1996 Hyundai New Porter

The upgraded second generation was a facelifted version of the second generation model. Round headlights, a steering wheel from the 1991 Sonata, and the dashboard from the newer Grace, were the main differences. In The Netherlands, it was called Hyundai H150.

The 1993 Porter was available with a regular cab, an extended cab, or a double cab. The diesel four-cylinder engine was called the Cyclone D4BX, a Hyundai-built version of Mitsubishi's 4D56 2.5 liter four-cylinder.

=== Third generation (1996–2004) ===
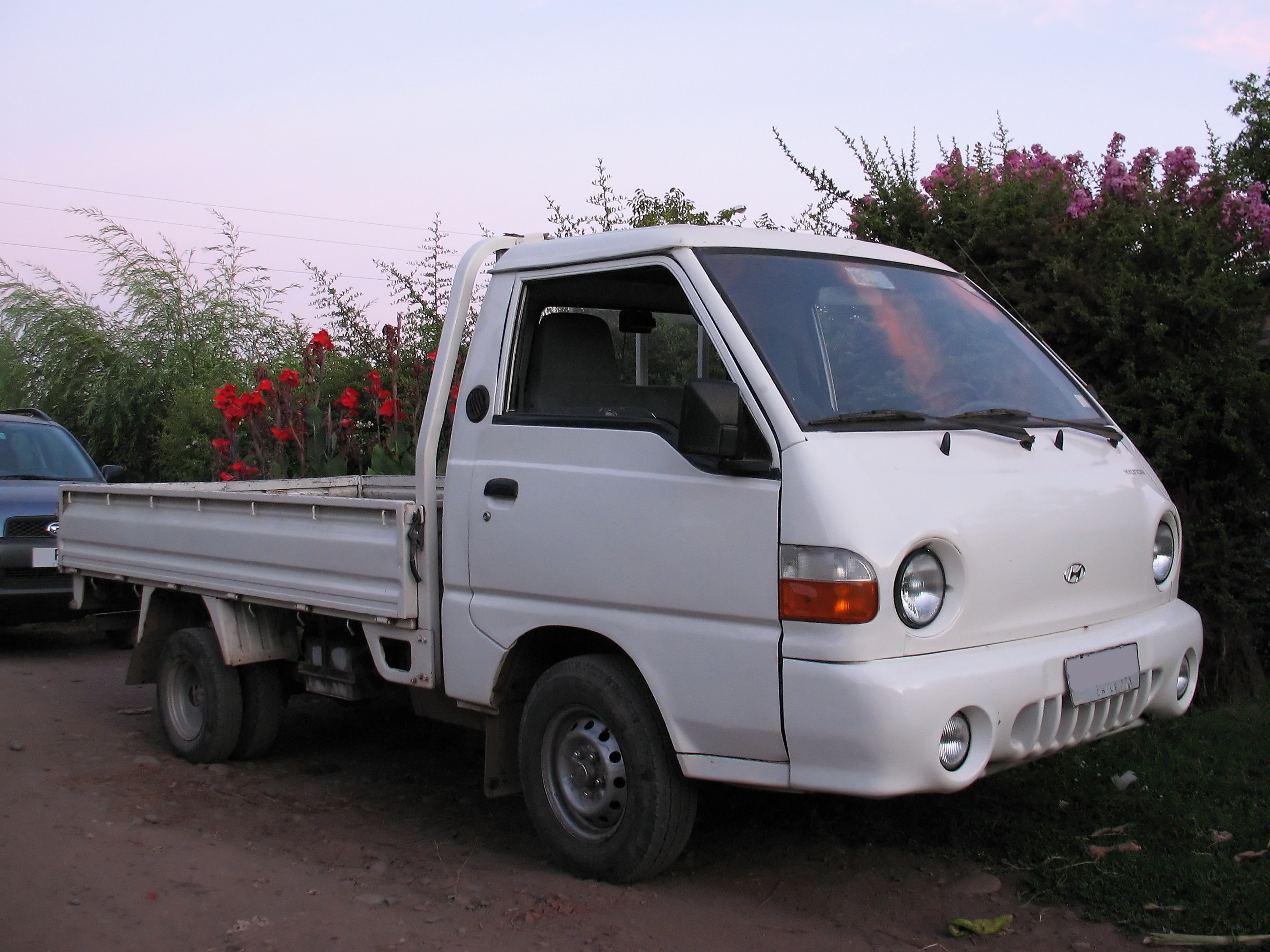
Hyundai Porter

The third generation, called the New Porter that based on Hyundai Grace, was launched in March 1996. It was built as a 2- and 4-door truck and a 3- and 4-door van. In South Africa, it was known as the Hyundai Bakkie. In The Netherlands, it was called Hyundai H150. In Malaysia, it was known as Inokom Lorimas. In Pakistan, it entered production in 1999 and was called the Hyundai Shehzore.

=== Fourth generation (2004–present) ===
Fourth generation
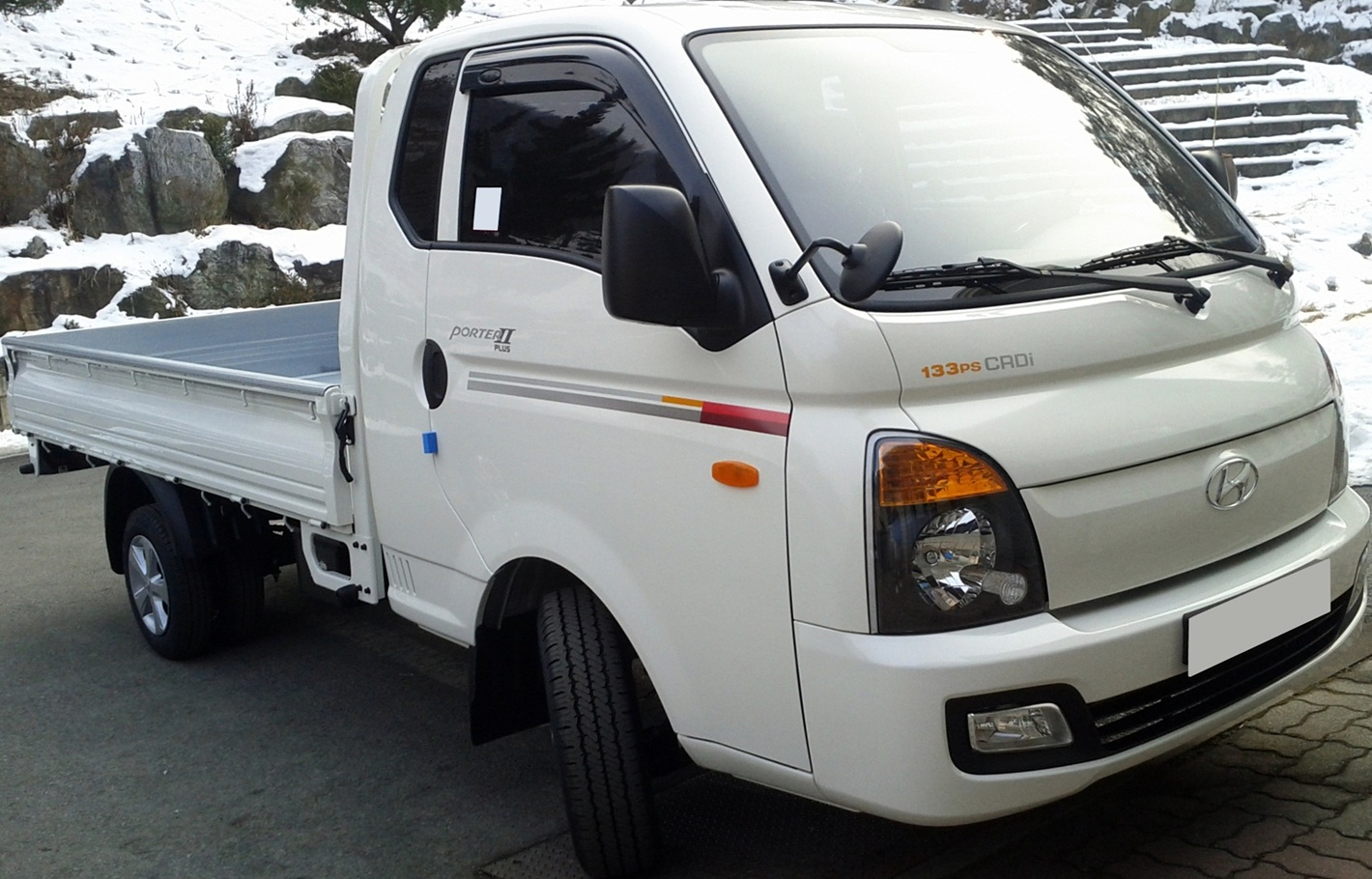
- Hyundai Porter II, "Super Cab" model with extended wheelbase and A2 CRDi turbodiesel engine.

Overview
- Manufacturer: Hyundai
- Also called: Hyundai H-100; JAC Kaida X5/X6 (China); JAC Shuailing i3 (China); Dodge H100 (Mexico)
- Production: 2004–present 2018–2020 (Algeria)
- Assembly: Ulsan, South Korea; Tiaret, Algeria (TMC Group); Santa Rosa, Philippines (HARI, 2009–2022); (HMPH, 2022–present); Hsinchu, Taiwan (SYM Motors)

Body and chassis
- Layout: FR layout F4 layout

Powertrain
- Engine: Diesel: 2.5 L A2 CRDi turbo I4; 2.6 L T2 I4
- Transmission: 5-speed manual (T2 engine); 6-speed manual (A2 engine); 4-speed automatic 5-speed automatic 1-speed fixed gear ratio (EV)

Dimensions
- Wheelbase: 2,430 mm (95.7 in) or 2,640 mm (103.9 in)
- Length: 4,810–5,175 mm (189.4–203.7 in)
- Width: 1,740 mm (68.5 in)
- Height: 1,970 mm (77.6 in)
- Curb weight: 1,620–1,794 kg (3,571–3,955 lb)

The fourth generation is called the Porter II. In South Korea, it is available in either a single-cab, extended-cab or double-cab models. The single-cab model is available with a choice of two wheelbases, 2,430 mm (95.7 in) or 2,640 mm (103.9 in); the extended-cab is limited to the longer wheelbase; and the double-cab is limited to the shorter wheelbase.

There is also a choice of two engines: a T2 (D4BB) 2.6-litre inline-four, diesel engine, which develops a maximum power of 79 PS (58 kW) at 4,000 rpm and a maximum torque of 17 kg⋅m (123 lb⋅ft) at 2,200 rpm; or an A2 2.5-litre I4 common rail turbo diesel engine which develops a maximum power of 130 PS (96 kW) at 3,800 rpm and a maximum torque of 26 kg⋅m (188 lb⋅ft) from 1,500 to 3,500 rpm.

In January 2012, the facelifted Porter was launched in South Korea. Engine power was increased to 133 hp, 6-speed manual and 5-speed automatic transmissions replaced the former 5-speed manual and 4-speed automatic. Also the steering wheel design was updated. Safety features like airbags and reverse parking sensor were added. Convenience features such as steering wheel audio controls, a 7-inch navigation screen, hipass rear view mirror, Bluetooth handsfree were added.

In August 2013, a four-wheel drive variant was added to the lineup, available only with a manual transmission.

Due to the introduction of new regulations, tire pressure monitoring system, stability control and anti-lock braking became standard on every variant since 2015. But driver airbag is still optional instead of 4WD variant which doesn't offers driver airbag as option. Also, passenger side airbag and navigation option was added.

On August 26, 2016, euro 6 model was revealed. Beige color option was added and driver airbag get standard on every RWD variant. Passenger side airbag gets standard on top trim variants.

In 2016, the Porter was the best-selling vehicle in South Korea, with 44,696 vehicles delivered domestically through May 2016 (compared to 39,779 units of the Hyundai Avante in the same period). Globally, Hyundai sold 99,743 Porters in 2015.

In December 2019, a battery-electric version was launched in South Korea. It has a claimed range of 211 km (131 mi) on a full charge; the maximum output is 135 kW (181 hp) and 395 N⋅m (291 lbf⋅ft) of torque, drawing from a 58.8 kW-hr battery. Combined efficiency is 3.1 km/kWh (1.9 mi/kWh). The Porter II EV is available only with the long wheelbase and extended cab; compared to the conventional diesel equivalent, curb weight increases from 1,820 to 1,970 kg (4,010 to 4,340 lb).

In October 2019, the Hyundai Class-1 Modern Jeepney in the Philippines, which is based on the H100, was released as part of the Public Utility Vehicle Modernization Program by the Philippine government.

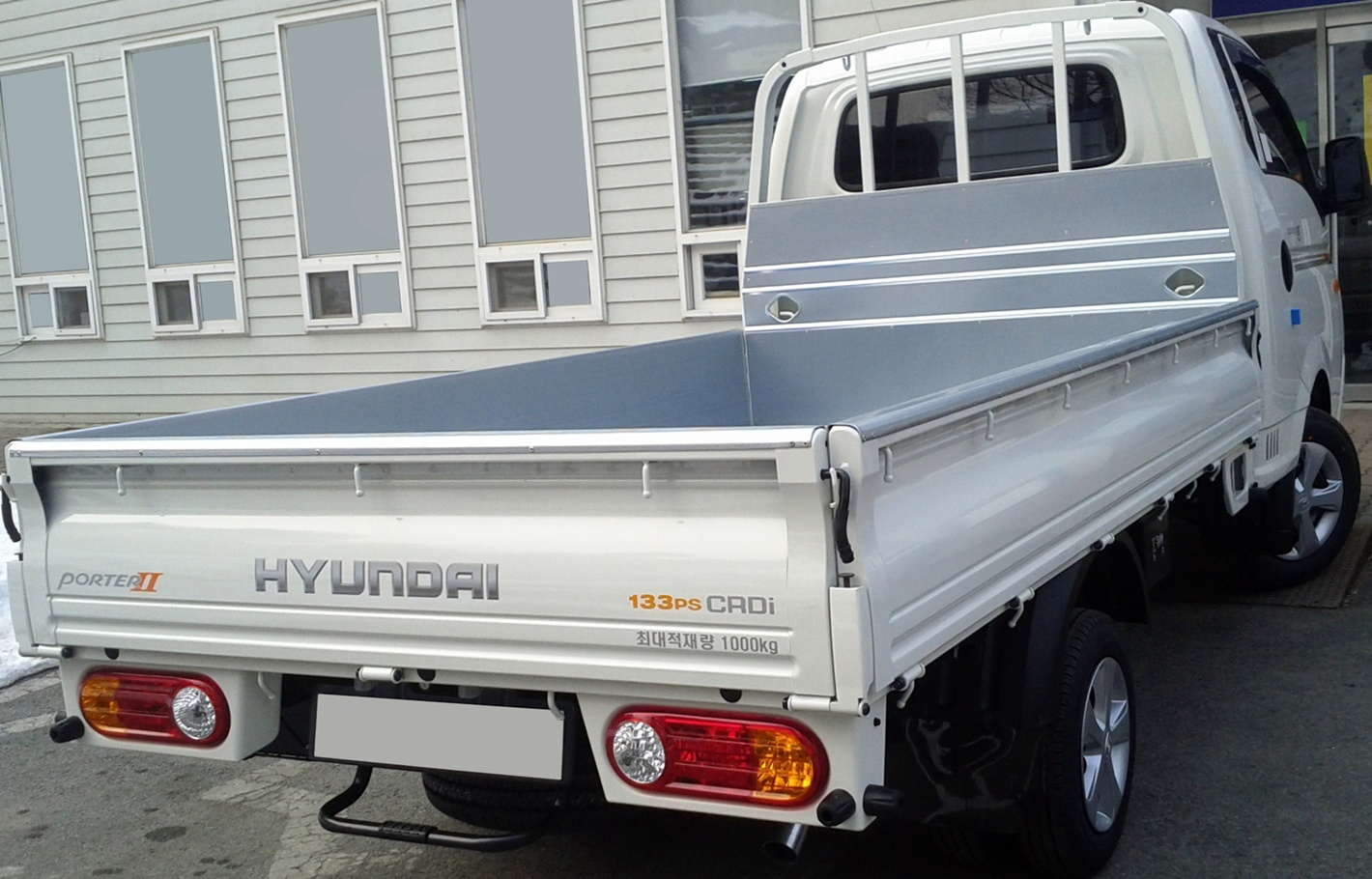
Rear view

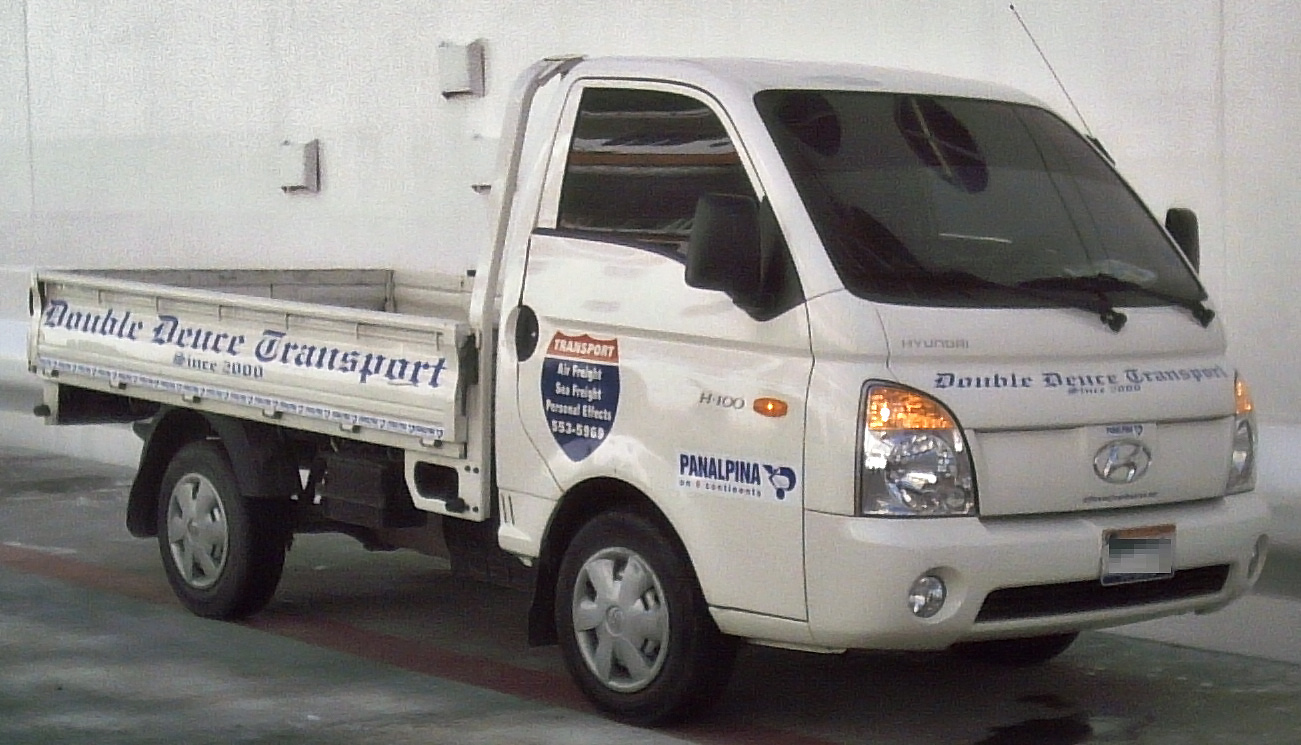
Hyundai H100

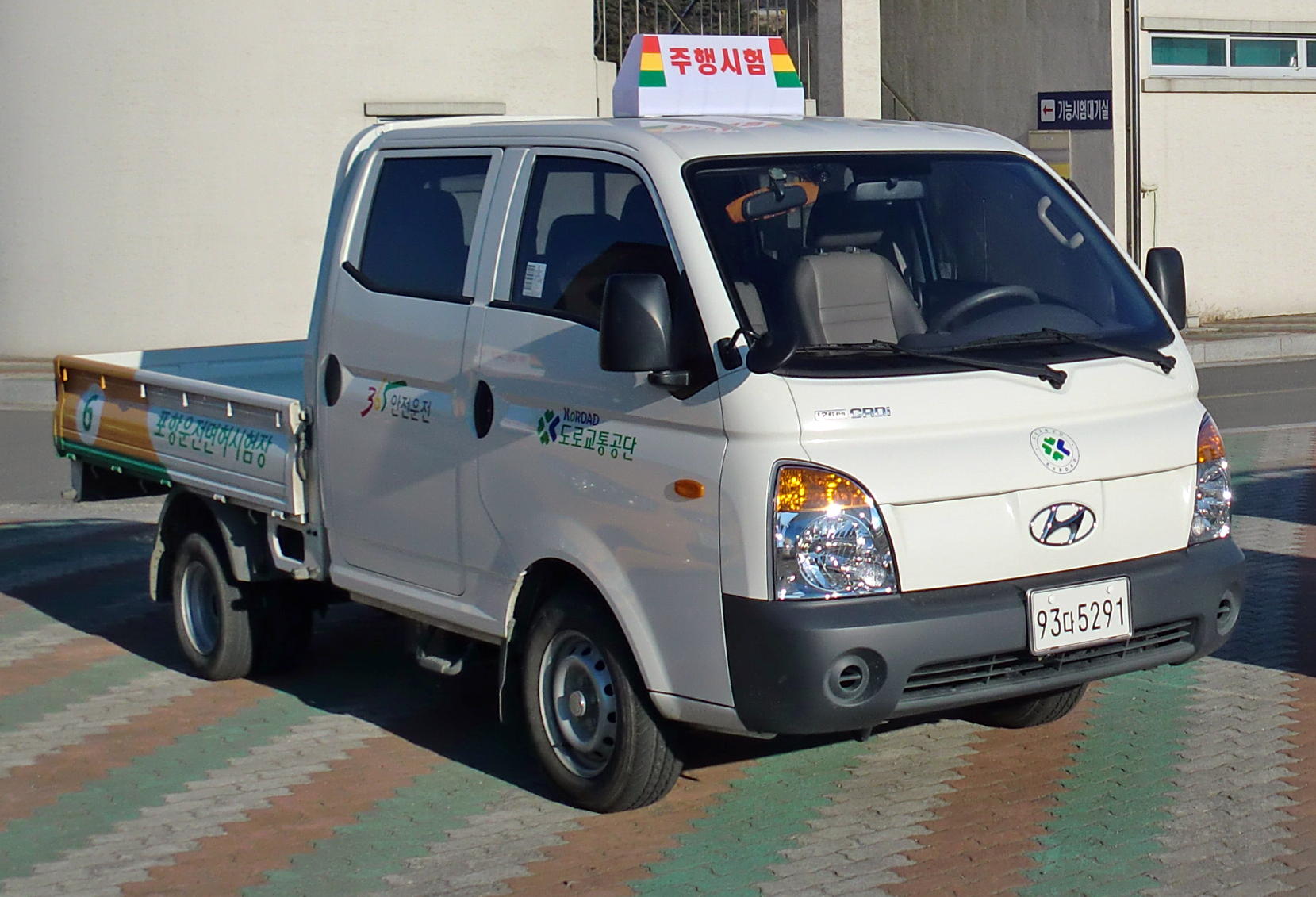
Hyundai Porter double cab

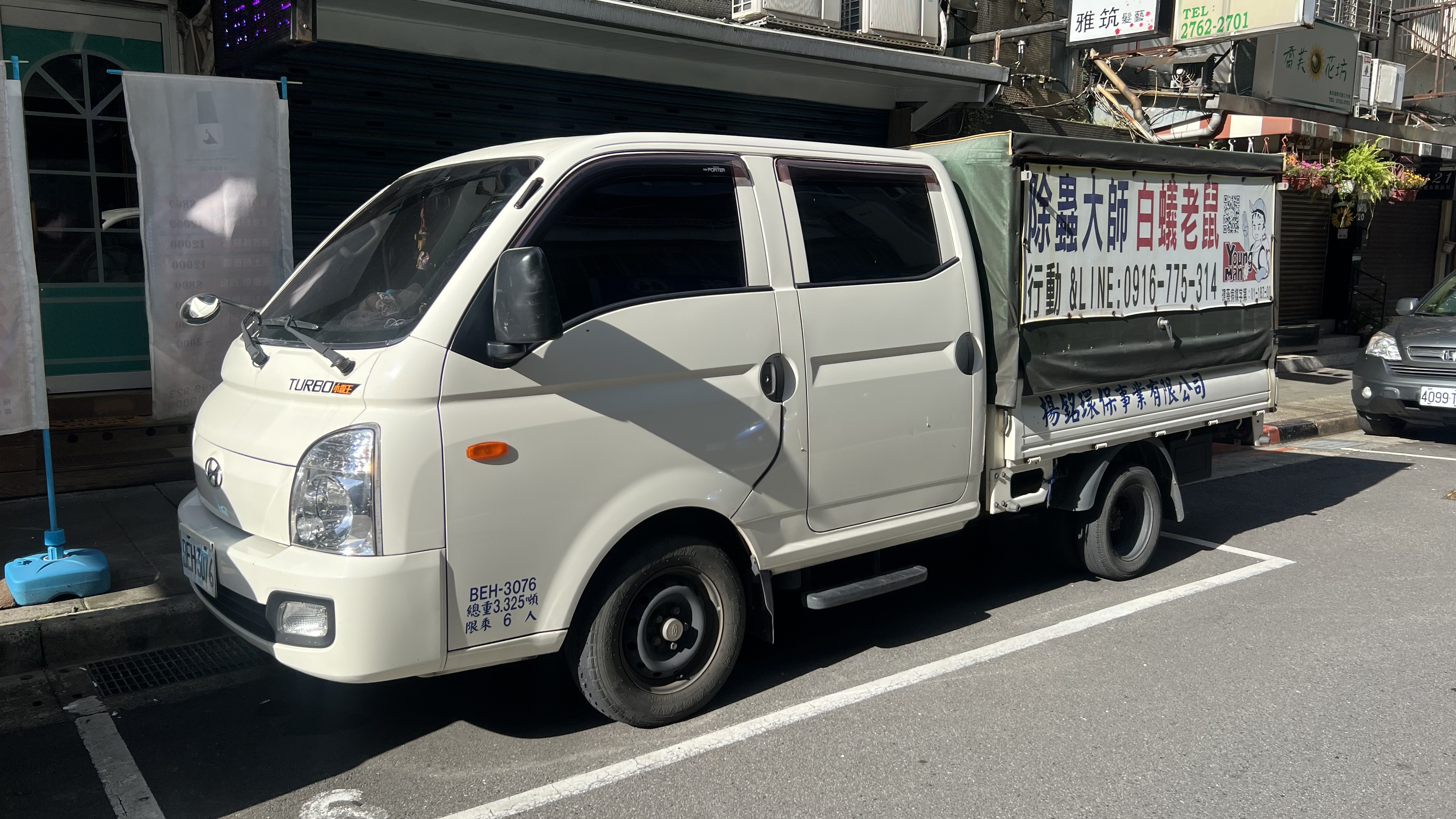
Hyundai Porter II double cab

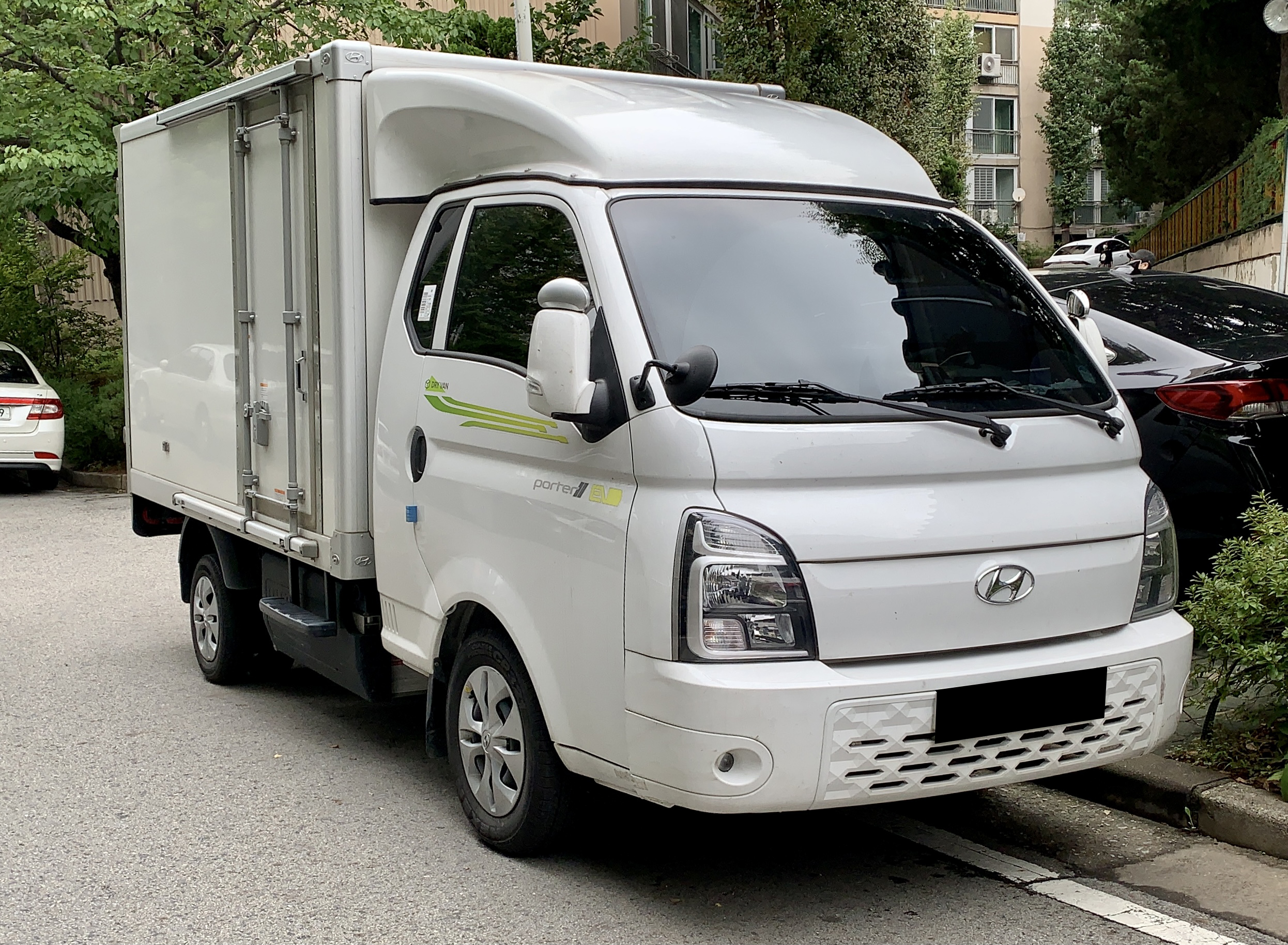
Hyundai Porter Electric

== Local names ==
Country	Assembled	Make	Model	Since
South Korea	Ulsan	Hyundai	H-100 Porter	1977
Philippines	Santa Rosa	Hyundai	H-100	2009
Brazil	Anápolis	Hyundai	HR	
Libya		Hyundai	Dragonfly	
Malaysia	Kulim	Inokom	Lorimas AU26	
Indonesia	Bekasi	Hyundai	Arya H-100	
Mexico		Dodge	H-100	
Pakistan	Faisalabad	Hyundai	Porter H-100	2019 (Note: Production halted due to the 2009 bankruptcy of Dewan Farooque Motors Reintroduced by Hyundai Nishat Motors in 2019 as Hyundai Porter H-100)
Russia	Taganrog (Note: Generation III Porters assembled from complete knock-down kits by TagAZ)	Hyundai	Porter	
South Africa		Hyundai	H-100 (Note: AKA Tipper)	1997
Vietnam	Ninh Binh	Hyundai	H-100/H-150	2016
Algeria	Tiaret	Hyundai	H-100	2018

== See also ==
- Mitsubishi Delica
- Hyundai Grace
- Kia Bongo
