= NDLS =

NDLS is an acronym that may stand for:

- Notre Dame Law School
- The code for the New Delhi railway station, India
- Nederlands, acronym used for Dutch language in Belgium
- National Dock Labour Scheme; see National Dock Labour Board

== See also ==
- NDL (disambiguation)
