= Khairpur, Chakwal =

Village in Pakistan

Khairpur, Chakwal Khardehr
- Village and union council
- Country: Pakistan
- Region: Punjab Province
- District: Chakwal District
- Tehsil: Kallar Kahar
- Elevation: 2,650 m (8,690 ft)
- Time zone: UTC+5 (PST)
- Area code: 48380

Khairpur (old name Khardehr) is a village and union council in Kallar Kahar Tehsil, Chakwal District in the Punjab Province of Pakistan. It has a DG Khan Cement plant.
