= MCB Bank =

Pakistani commercial bank

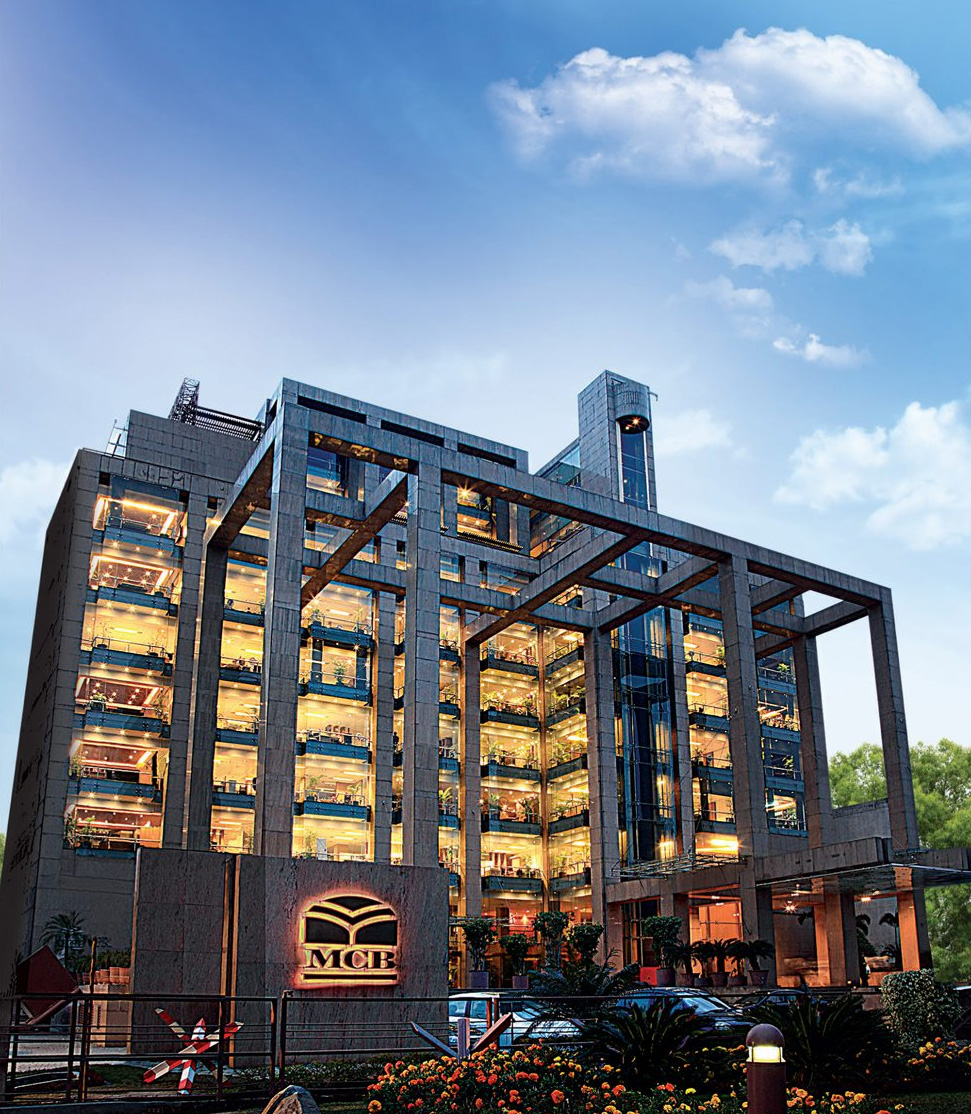
- Headquarters of MCB Bank in Lahore
- Formerly: Muslim Commercial Bank Limited (1947–2005)
- Type: Public
- Traded as: PSX: MCB; KSE 100 component KSE 30 component
- Industry: Banking
- Founded: July 9, 1947; 79 years ago
- Founder: Adamjee Haji Dawood
- Headquarters: MCB Building, Lahore, 54660, Pakistan
- Number of locations: 1,410 (2025)
- Key people: Mian Mohammad Mansha (Chairman); Muhammad Nauman Chughtai (CEO)
- Products: Loans, credit cards, Debit cards, savings, consumer banking, Home Remittance etc.
- Revenue: ▼Rs. 181.40 billion (US$650 million) (2025)
- Operating income: ▼ Rs. 115.45 billion (US$410 million) (2025)
- Net income: ▼ Rs. 54.19 billion (US$190 million) (2025)
- Total assets: ▲ Rs. 3.24 trillion (US$12 billion) (2025)
- Total equity: ▲Rs. 243.63 billion (US$870 million) (2025)
- Owner: Maybank (18.78%); Nishat Mills (8.02%); Adamjee Insurance (5%); Security General Insurance (5%)
- Number of employees: 15,410 (2025)
- Parent: Maybank; Nishat Group
- Subsidiaries: MCB Islamic Bank; MCB Non-Bank Credit Organization Closed Joint Stock Company; MCB Investment Management Limited (81.42%)
- Website: mcb.com.pk

MCB Bank Limited is a Pakistani commercial bank which is based in Lahore, Punjab. It is majority owned by a group of companies affiliated with Nishat Group and Malaysian bank Maybank.

MCB Bank is listed on the Pakistan Stock Exchange.

== History ==
MCB Bank was incorporated as Muslim Commercial Bank in July 1947, shortly before the Partition of India, under the encouragement of Muhammad Ali Jinnah. The founders, Adamjee Haji Dawood and M. A. Ispahani, were joined by directors from major Muslim commercial and industrial families, including the Ispahani, Adamjee, Dada, Arag, and Amin Jute families. Among the founding members was also Khwaja Shahabuddin, a former member of the first Muslim ministry in Bengal from 1937 to 1940.

In 1964, MCB became part of Adamjee Group.

MCB was nationalised in 1974 during the government of Zulfikar Ali Bhutto. Subsequently, its shares were de-listed from the Karachi Stock Exchange after acquisition by the government of Pakistan.

On April 6, 1991, the government sold 26 percent of MCB's shares to the National Group at PKR 56 per share, totaling PKR 838.8 million. The transaction was conducted under an "as is where is" arrangement. It resulted in the Federal Government suspending most provisions of the Banks (Nationalization) Act, 1974 for six months, except section 5(6)(a).

The privatization process continued on February 19, 1992, with the public offering of an additional 25 percent of MCB's shares. Following the divestment of a 51 percent stake, MCB was no longer subject to the Banks (Nationalization) Act, 1974. On December 31, 1992, the National Group acquired another 24 percent of MCB's shares at Rs56.15 per share, increasing their total holding to 50 percent.

In 2005, the management of the bank abbreviated its name from Muslim Commercial Bank Limited to MCB Bank Limited to explore international markets; they were facing resistance due to the word Muslim especially from Western Countries to avail licence.

In 2008, Maybank (Malaysia) announced the acquisition of 20% of the stake in MCB Bank Limited's equity by purchasing a little more than 94 million ordinary shares from the Nishat Group. This transaction amounted to MYR 2.17 billion (US$686 million) in value. The price paid by the Maybank was Pak. Rupees 470 per ordinary share of MCB. In 2008, the head office of MCB was shifted from MCB Tower, Karachi to Lahore in a newly constructed building, namely MCB House located at Sharea Ghous-ul-Azam, commonly known as Jail Road.

In 2000, MCB established its Islamic Banking Business Group and opened its first branch in 2003. By 2014, the Islamic Banking network had grown to 34 branches. This was in addition to and separate from the bank's 1,100 conventional banking branches. In 2015, given the potential of Islamic Banking business, the bank proceeded to establish an independent but wholly owned subsidiary bank named MCB Islamic Bank Limited, referred to as MIB in short.

== Headquarters ==
MCB Tower, situated in Karachi, Pakistan is the former headquarters of MCB Bank Limited. The tower includes 29 floors and 3 basement floors. The bank is now headquartered in the MCB Building on Jail Road in Lahore.

== MCB Islamic Bank ==
MCB Islamic Bank (MIB) is a subsidiary of MCB Bank. MIB was established as a demerger from MCB and NIB Bank.

== MNET Services Amalgamation with and into MCB Bank ==
MNET Services (Private) Limited amalgamated with and into MCB Bank, the effective date of amalgamation was April 30, 2019.

== Subsidiaries ==
- MCB Islamic Bank Limited
- MCB Investment Management Limited
- MCB Non–Bank Credit Organization Closed Joint Stock Company
- MCB Exchange Company (Private) Limited

== See also ==
- Economy of Pakistan
- List of banks in Pakistan
