= Mahmud Khan Gujjar =

- Wazir; Jan Nisar Khan

Sardar of Dera Ghazi Khan
- Reign: 1738 – 1772
- Predecessor: Position established
- Successor: Barkhurdar Khan
- Born: Late 1600s Mughal Empire
- Died: 1772; Sirhind
- Issue: Allahdad Khan; Fazil Khan
- Father: Muhammad Yusuf

Mahmud Khan Gujjar (or Mahmood Khan) (died 1772) was the 18th-century Governor and de facto ruler of Dera Ghazi Khan district from 1738 till 1772. Initially, he served as a wazir under Mirrani governors of D.G Khan. He is credited as the founder of the Mahmood Kot area of D.G Khan district. During his rule, he built some important canals in the region.

== Early life and history ==
Mahmud Khan Gujjar (or Mehmood Khan) served as the de facto ruler and governor of the Dera Ghazi Khan from around 1738 to 1772. He was the son of Yusuf Khan. He was born in a Gujjar family of Punjab region. Previously he served as a grand wazir under Mirrani governors of D.G Khan. Prior to Mahmud Khan, the area was under the control of Mirani governors who were ruling as a vassal of rulers of Khorasan. (Note: Rulers of Khorasan (Khorasan dynasty), likely mentioned here were the Dhurrani rulers of the Durrani Empire, those were ruling at that time in the Khorasan region of Afghanistan.)

In the early 18th century, the Gujjars and Makhdums kept building and extending the flood canals to the southern part of the Dera Ghazi Khan district. By the 1740 CE they controlled most of southern Dera Ghazi Khan. Then Makhdum Rajan Shah of Sitapur stepped in. He was governor and custodian of a major sufi shrine on the Indus River. He built 70 miles long Dhundi Canal. Mahmud Khan teamed up with the Durranis and Kalhoras to overthrow Mirranis and then initiated a project to build and restore canals in D.G. Khan.

The Punjab Government Gazetteer credits him with founding the settlement of Mehmood Kot (now a city) and initiating canal works in the region. In 1713 C.E. he built two canals in D.G Khan named Nur and Yusuf (also known as Soan) canals. Later, in 1723 C.E. he built Bisharat and Mahmud canals. During his rule, he built a fort named "Gujari" in Mahmood Kot area of D.G Khan. Mahmood Kot fort in present-day Muzaffargarh District was also built by Mahmood Gujjar.

The Mahmood Khan recognized the overlordship of Kalhora dynasty of Sindh. In 1769, Ghulam Shah Kalhoro, the ruler of the Kalhora dynasty, attacked the Mirrani Balochs. He later appointed again Mahmood Khan Gujjar as governor of D.G. Khan and Mahmood was later succeed by his nephew Barkhurdhar Gujjar, who was later killed in 1779.

After the death of Mahmud Khan Gujjar, the ruler of Khorasan made Mian Shah Nawaz next ruler of D.G. Khan. When his minister Guddu Ram was killed, unrest started. The king of Khorasan then ordered Mian Ghulam Shah Kalhora to act. Ghulam Shah came to Dera Ghazi Khan, arrested the last Mirani ruler, and took him to Sindh where he died and was buried. After that, Dera Ghazi Khan came under the king of Kabul's direct rule, with the Kalhora dynasty in charge. After the end of rule of the Gujjars in D.G Khan next governors of D.G Khan were directly appointed by rulers of Khorasan in Afghanistan.

== See also ==
- Gurjars in Punjab
- Mahmud Kot railway station
- Kalhora dynasty
- History of Punjab
