= Nishat Group =

Pakistani conglomerate based in Lahore

- Native name: گروه نشاط
- Type: Corporate group
- Industry: Automotive assembly; Banking; Hospitality; Insurance; Power generation and distribution; Textile
- Founded: 1951; 75 years ago
- Founders: Mian Muhammad Yahya; Mian Hameed; Mian Rafiq; Mian Ayub
- Headquarters: Lahore, Pakistan
- Key people: Mian Muhammad Mansha (chairman)
- Total assets: ▲US$6 billion (2021)
- Number of employees: 43,000 (2021)
- Website: nishatmillsltd.com

Nishat Group (Urdu pronunciation: [nɪʃaːt̪]) is a group of companies headquartered in Lahore, Pakistan. It was founded in 1951. Mian Muhammad Mansha is the current chairman of the group.

At least eleven of Nishat Group's subsidiaries are listed on the Pakistan Stock Exchange.

== History ==
Nishat Group's origins go back to a leather business in Calcutta, British India, established by Mian Muhammad Yahya. Following the partition of India in 1947, Mian Muhammad Yahya and his three brothers, Mian Hameed, Mian Rafiq, and Mian Ayub, founded Nishat Mills in Pakistan in 1951. The name "Nishat" was pre-assigned to the textile license they acquired and was not chosen by the founders.

Mian Muhammad Mansha joined the family business in 1968 after the death of his father, Mian Muhammad Yahya. By 1970, the Nishat Group had expanded to include six industrial units in West Pakistan: Nishat Corporation, Nishat Sarhad Textile, Nishat Textile Faisalabad, Nishat Chemical Industries, Nishat Poultry, and Creamy Industries Nowshera. The group also had investments in East Pakistan prior to the independence of Bangladesh, including Nishat Jute Mills, Qadiryah Textile Mills, Telgin Cotton Mills, and Chemical Industries of Pakistan. Nishat Jute Mills was acquired by the group from the Pakistan Industrial Development Corporation in East Pakistan.

In 1969, the assets of the group were divided among the family members. Mian Muhammad Mansha received assets located in West Pakistan, while assets in East Pakistan were transferred to other family members, which were eventually lost after the creation of Bangladesh.

In January 1995, Nishat Group planned to issue $70 million in global depository receipts (GDRs) through ABN Amro to finance the equity portion of a $216 million greenfield project for Hercules Cement. The GDR issuance was canceled in February 1995 due to unfavorable international and local market conditions.

== List of companies ==
=== Listed companies ===
Following are the companies which are listed on the Pakistan Stock Exchange:

- Adamjee Insurance
  - Adamjee Life Assurance
- DG Cement
  - Nishat Paper Products
  - Nishat Dairy
- MCB Bank
  - MCB Islamic Bank
  - MCB Funds
- Nishat Mills
  - Nishat Linen
  - Nishat Apparel
  - Nishat Dying and Finishing
  - Nishat Power
- Nishat Chunian
  - The Linen Company
- Lalpir Power
- Nishat Chunian Power
- Pakgen Power

=== Unlisted companies ===
Following are the companies which are not listed on the Pakistani Stock Exchange:

- Pakistan Aviators & Aviation
- Security General Insurance
- Nishat Hotels and Properties Limited
  - Nishat Hospitality
  - Nishat Residences
- Nishat Hotels
  - Nishat Hotel, Aziz Avenue
  - Nishat Hotel, Gulberg
  - Nishat Hotel, Raiwind
  - St James's Hotel and Club
- Nishat Agriculture Farming
- Nishat Automobile

Recently Nishat group has set up his Denim Fabric mill named as Nishat Fabrics.

==== Nishat Automobile ====
In February 2017, it was announced that both companies are venturing to assemble cars in Pakistan.

In March 2017, it was announced that Nishat Group will setup their first plant in Faisalabad, Pakistan, which will assemble electric cars. Nishat Group will have a 42% stake in the venture.

==== Nishat Agriculture Farms ====
In 2024, the company announced its plans to invest in corporate farming.

== Defunct ==
- First Nishat Modaraba
- Genertech
- Nishat Tek
- Raza Textile Mills
- Umer Fabrics

== See also ==
- List of largest companies in Pakistan
