= Lalpir Power =

Power plant complex in Mehmood Kot, District Muzaffargarh, Punjab, Pakistan

- Country: Pakistan
- Location: Mehmood Kot, Muzaffargarh District
- Coordinates: 30°10′22″N 70°59′37″E
- Status: Defunct
- Construction began: 1994
- Commission date: 1997
- Decommission date: 2025
- Owner: Nishat Group

Thermal power station
- Primary fuel: Furnace oil

Power generation
- Nameplate capacity: 727 MW

External links
- Website: lalpir.com pakgenpower.com

The Lalpir Power Complex, (Urdu: لال پیر پاور) is a defunct power plant complex located in Mehmood Kot, District Muzaffargarh, Punjab, Pakistan. It comprised two power plants: Lalpir Power and Pakgen Power, both of which were established in 1994 and remained active until 2024, when the Government of Pakistan prematurely terminated its energy purchase agreement amid concerns about coercion and threats to file corruption cases against IPP owners should they seek international arbitration.

It was incorporated in 1994. Lal Pir 1 produces 362 MW of electricity whereas Lal Pir 2, which is also known as PakGen Power, produces 365MW of electricity. It is owned by Nishat Group.

It is listed on the Pakistan Stock Exchange.

== History ==
Lal Pir power complex was established by the AES Corporation in 1994 and consists of a single residual fuel-oil boiler and a steam turbine generator. Nichimen Japan was hired as an EPC contractor.

In 2010, Nishat Group and a consortium acquired the two plants, AES Lalpir and PakGen from AES Corporation. Nishat Group became the controlling shareholder of the company with a 50 percent shareholding, whereas Abu Dhabi Investment Council (ADIC), which is owned by the Government of Abu Dhabi, acquired 30 percent of the shares, and The City School received 20 percent of the stake.

=== Lal Pir 1 ===
In April 1994, the project's final financing was completed with the International Finance Corporation (IFC) signing a $49.5 million debt/equity package on April 7. The total project cost was estimated at $350 million. The IFC provided a $40 million loan and acquired a 10 percent equity stake in AES Lal Pir, a subsidiary created by AES Corporation to operate the plant, with AES retaining a 90 percent ownership. The Bank of Tokyo in London also arranged a ¥20,250 million ($209 million) loan from international commercial banks, guaranteed by the Export-Import Bank of Japan (Jeximbank).

In December 1997, the facility began commercial operations, following the establishment of a 30-year power purchase agreement with the Water & Power Development Authority (WAPDA) and a fuel supply agreement with Pakistan State Oil which was signed in 1994.

In 2010, Lalpir Power was acquired by a consortium led by the Nishat Group at a price of PKR 14.9 per share.

In 2013, Lalpir Power was listed on the Karachi Stock Exchange following an initial public offering at a strike price of PKR 22 per share.

=== Lal Pir 2 ===
In February 1996, AES Transpower, a subsidiary of AES Corporation based in the United States, finalized the financing for the construction of the Lal Pir-2 power station in Muzaffargarh, Punjab, Pakistan. The project was undertaken by AES Pak Gen, a wholly owned subsidiary of AES Transpower.

The financing for the project included a $40 million buyer's credit facility from the Export-Import Bank of Japan (Jeximbank) and an additional ¥14,203 million ($133 million) loan. The Bank of Tokyo arranged and syndicated the loan among 15 private financial institutions. The Japanese Ministry of International Trade and Industry provided insurance coverage for this portion of the financing. The International Finance Corporation (IFC) also contributed to the project's financing by providing a direct loan of $20 million, assisting in arranging a $50 million syndicated loan with Dresdner Bank and ING Bank, and making an equity investment of $9.5 million. AES itself invested $85.5 million in equity. The total estimated cost of the Lal Pir-2 project was $350 million.

The power station, with a capacity of 365 MW, was constructed on a build–operate–transfer (BOO) basis and is the second AES facility in Punjab. It is equipped with a steam turbine and uses residual fuel oil. Nichimen Company of Japan was awarded the turnkey contract, and Mitsubishi Heavy Industries (MHI) supplied the major equipment. The station began commercial operations in December 1997 after signing power purchase agreements with the Water & Power Development Authority (WAPDA) and fuel supply contracts with Pakistan State Oil.

In 2011, Pakgen Power Limited, also known as Lal Pir-2, was listed on the Karachi Stock Exchange following an initial public offering at a strike price of PKR 19 per share.

== Shareholding pattern ==
=== Lalpir Power Company ===
Shareholders	% of Shareholding
Nishat Mills Limited	28.93
Jahangir Firoz (The City School)	18.17
Adamjee Insurance	7.20
Mian Hassan Mansha	6.84
Security General Insurance	3.11
Others via Pakistan Stock Exchange	35.75
As of December 2023
