= NDL =

NDL is a three letter acronym that stands for:

== Sports ==
- National Disability League, a multi-display sports tournament
- National Dodgeball League, U.S.
- National Development League, British third tier speedway league

== Transportation ==
- Nandyal railway station, Andhra Pradesh, India
- Needles (Amtrak station), Needles, California, USA
- North Dulwich railway station, London, England
- N'Délé Airport (IATA: NDL), Central African Republic

== Other uses ==
- Ndl (trigraph), used in the Romanized Popular Alphabet to write Hmong
- Collège Notre-Dame-de-Lourdes, Longueuil, Quebec, Canada
- Ndolo dialect (ISO 639:ndl), a Bantu language spoken in the Democratic Republic of the Congo
- National Diet Library, the national library of Japan
- Network Definition Language Burroughs large systems compiler
- Network Description Language
- No Decompression Limit, the time interval that a scuba diver may theoretically spend at a given depth without having to perform any decompression stops
- Norddeutscher Lloyd (1858–1970), a German steamship company
- Norwegian Defence League, (politics, Norway) a Norwegian offshoot of the European Defence League
- Niko Defence League, (UK, parody) a movement started in opposition to the English Defence League

== See also ==
- NDLS (disambiguation)
