= Mehmood Kot =

Mehmood Kot station محمود کوٹ
- City
- Location in Pakistan
- Coordinates: 30°11′52″N 71°28′11″E
- Country: Pakistan
- Province: Punjab
- Division: Dera Ghazi Khan
- Districts: Muzaffargarh
- Tehsil: Kot Addu
- Post Code: 34110
- Time zone: UTC+5 (PST)
- Postal code: 34110
- Area code: 066

Mehmood Kot or Mehmud Kot (Urdu: محمُود كوٹ, Punjabi: محمود کوٹ) is a city in District Muzaffargarh, Punjab, Pakistan.

Mehmood Kot was established by Mehmood Gujjar, the ruler of Dera Ghazi Khan in the 17th century. He built a fort here which he named after himself. The Lal Pir Power is in Mehmood Kot and produces 362 MW of electricity. The city is served by Mahmud Kot railway station.
