= Mian Muhammad Mansha =

Pakistani businessman (born 1941)

Mian Mohammad Mansha
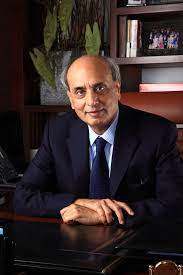
- Born: Mian Mohammad Mansha Yahya; 1941 (age 84–85); Chiniot, Punjab, Pakistan
- Education: Hendon College of Technology
- Occupation: Businessman
- Spouse: Naz Mansha
- Children: Umar Mansha, Hassan Mansha

Mian Mohammad Mansha Yahya (Urdu: میاں محمد منشاء یحییٰ) is a Pakistani business magnate who is the current chairman of MCB Bank and one of the wealthiest individuals in Pakistan. His family owns Nishat Group. Mansha and some of his immediate family members are among the highest tax-paying individuals in Pakistan. Mansha is married into a saigol family.

Mansha owns some of the most expensive houses in Europe, including the St. Georges Hill gated estate in London.

== Early life and education ==
Mansha was born in Chiniot into a Chinioti Arain Punjabi business family. In the 1930s, Mansha's family had migrated to Kolkata, Bengal from Punjab. After the Partition of India, the family returned to Punjab, Pakistan. His family founded a cotton ginning business which later became the Nishat Mills Limited. He did his early schooling at Sacred Heart Convent, Faisalabad. Later, he attended Hendon College, London and earned a degree in business administration.

== Career ==
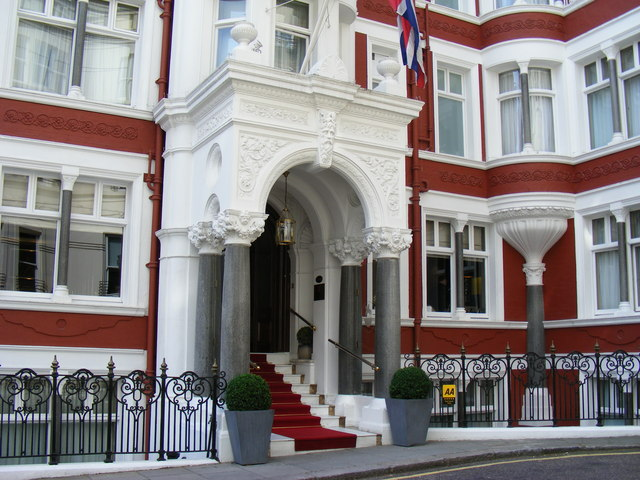
Mansha owns a London five star hotel

Mansha moved back to Pakistan after completing his studies in 1968. He began his career by joining the family business, Nishat Mills Limited in 1969 when his father died. Later, the business was split among his uncles.

In 1979, Mansha set up Pakistan's largest textile complex of seven factories in Nishatabad near Faisalabad. In the later years, another textile complex followed in Chunian near Lahore.

In 1992, Mansha acquired Muslim Commercial Bank along with other Pakistani businessmen. In the late 2000s, Mansha's subsidiaries acquired two power plants in Pakistan.

Mansha also served as a member of the board of directors at the Atlantic Council.

== Wealth ==
In March 2010, Mansha was the first Pakistani making it to the Forbes billionaires list. He was worth US$2.5 billion in 2013.

== Awards and recognition ==
Mansha was awarded the Sitara-e-Imtiaz by President of Pakistan Pervez Musharraf on 23 March 2004.

== See also ==
- Muslim Commercial Bank
- List of Pakistanis by net worth
