= Nishat Mills Limited =

Pakistani textile company

Nishat Mills
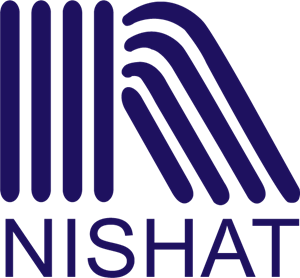
- Type: Public
- Traded as: PSX: NML; KSE 100 component KMI 30 component
- Industry: Textile
- Founded: 1951; 75 years ago
- Founders: Mian Muhammad Yahya; Mian Hameed; Mian Rafiq; Mian Ayub
- Headquarters: Lahore, Pakistan
- Area served: Worldwide
- Key people: Mian Umer Mansha (CEO); Mian Hassan Mansha (chairperson)
- Revenue: ▲ Rs. 212.511 billion (US$760 million) (2024)
- Operating income: ▼ Rs. 23.300 billion (US$83 million) (2024)
- Net income: ▼ Rs. 7.868 billion (US$28 million) (2024)
- Total assets: ▲ Rs. 273.706 billion (US$980 million) (2024)
- Total equity: ▲ Rs. 157.847 billion (US$560 million) (2024)
- Number of employees: 27,776 (2024)
- Parent: Nishat Group
- Subsidiaries: Nishat Linen; Nishat Power; Nishat Spinning; Nishat Commodities; Nishat USA; Nishat Linen Trading LLC; Nishat International FZE; Nishat Global China
- Website: nishatmillsltd.com
- Footnotes; Financials as of 30 June 2024

Nishat Mills Limited (Urdu pronunciation: [niːˈʃaːt] nee-SHAHT) is a Pakistani textile company based in Lahore. It produces yarn, linen, and other products made from raw cotton and synthetic fibers. It is one of the largest textile companies in Pakistan.

== History ==
Nishat Mills Limited was founded in 1951 by Mian Muhammad Yahya, Mian Hameed, Mian Rafiq, and Mian Ayub. The name "Nishat" was pre-assigned to the textile license they acquired and was not chosen by the founders.

In 1995, Raza Textiles merged with its sister company, Umer Fabrics, which was later merged into Nishat Mills in 2004. Two years later, in 1997, Nishat Fabrics and Nishat Tek were amalgamated into Nishat Mills.

In May 2009, Nishat Apparel Limited was merged to Nishat Mills.

In January 2023, Nishat acquired Wernerfelt A/S, a company based in Denmark, from Lars Lauridsen Holding ApS.

In September 2024, Nishat sold its shareholding in Nishat Hospitality, established subsidiaries in the United Kingdom and Turkey, and opened a liaison office in Bangladesh.

== Subsidiaries ==
=== Nishat Power ===
Nishat Power Limited was incorporated in February 2007 as an independent power producer. It is a subsidiary of Nishat Mills Limited, which holds a 51 percent ownership stake.

Nishat Power commenced commercial operations on June 9, 2010. The power plant, supplied by Wärtsilä, is located near Kasur District in Punjab and operates using residual furnace oil, with a gross generation capacity of 200 MW. For the first five years, the operation and maintenance of the plant were handled by Wärtsilä, which later trained local staff to manage it in-house.

In 2009, Nishat Power Limited was listed on the Karachi Stock Exchange.

Under the power purchase agreement (PPA) signed with NTDC in 2007, Nishat Power received a tariff of 12.1253 U.S. cents per kilowatt-hour (kWh). The duration of the PPA was twenty-five years. Also, it had signed a ten-year fuel supply agreement with Shell Pakistan. The original PPA was signed by the Government of Pakistan with the sovereign guarantee and it offered 15 percent return on equity with United States dollar indexation. However, in August 2020, PPA was revised by the government and US dollar indexation was removed.

=== Nishat Linen ===
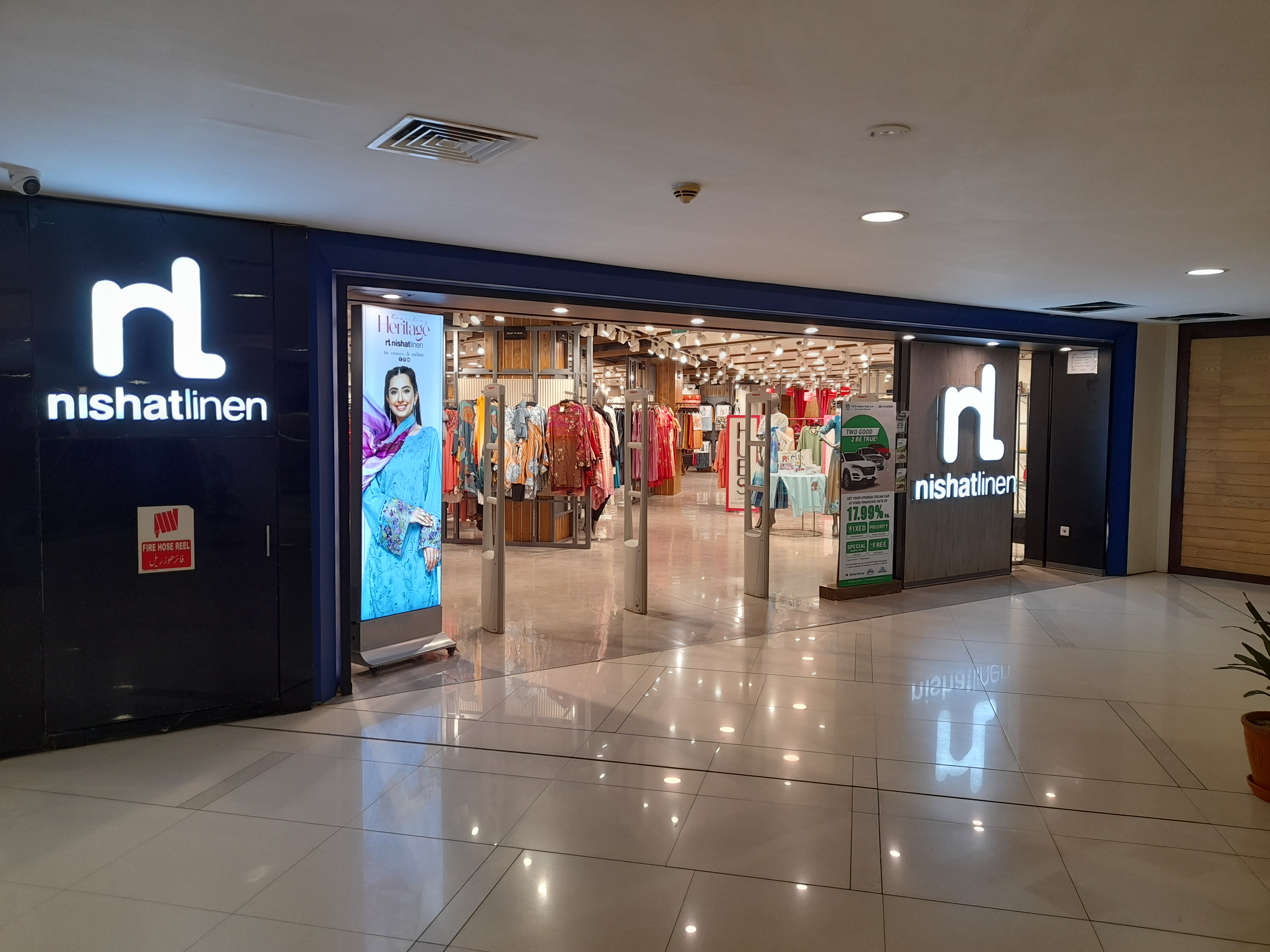
Nishat Linen store at Dolmen Mall in Karachi

Nishat Linen was founded in 1989 by Naz Mansha, the wife of Pakistani businessman, Mian Muhammad Mansha. Today, Nishat Linen is one of Pakistan's largest home textile brands, offering a variety of products including fabrics, ready-made garments, and home décor items.

In 1989, Nishat Linen established a factory. In 1994, the first retail store of Nishat was opened. Nishat Linen operates both in Pakistan and internationally, with retail stores and franchises in various countries, including the UAE, USA, Bangladesh, and the United Kingdom.

Nishat Linen also operates franchises of Inglot Cosmetics and Swarovski in Pakistan.

For its international operations, Nishat Linen has established a strong presence through franchises and direct retail outlets. One of the key international markets is the United Kingdom, where Nishat Linen has a dedicated Nishat Linen UK website for online shopping and customer engagement.
