= Wasnal =

Wasnal وسنال Vasnāl
- Village
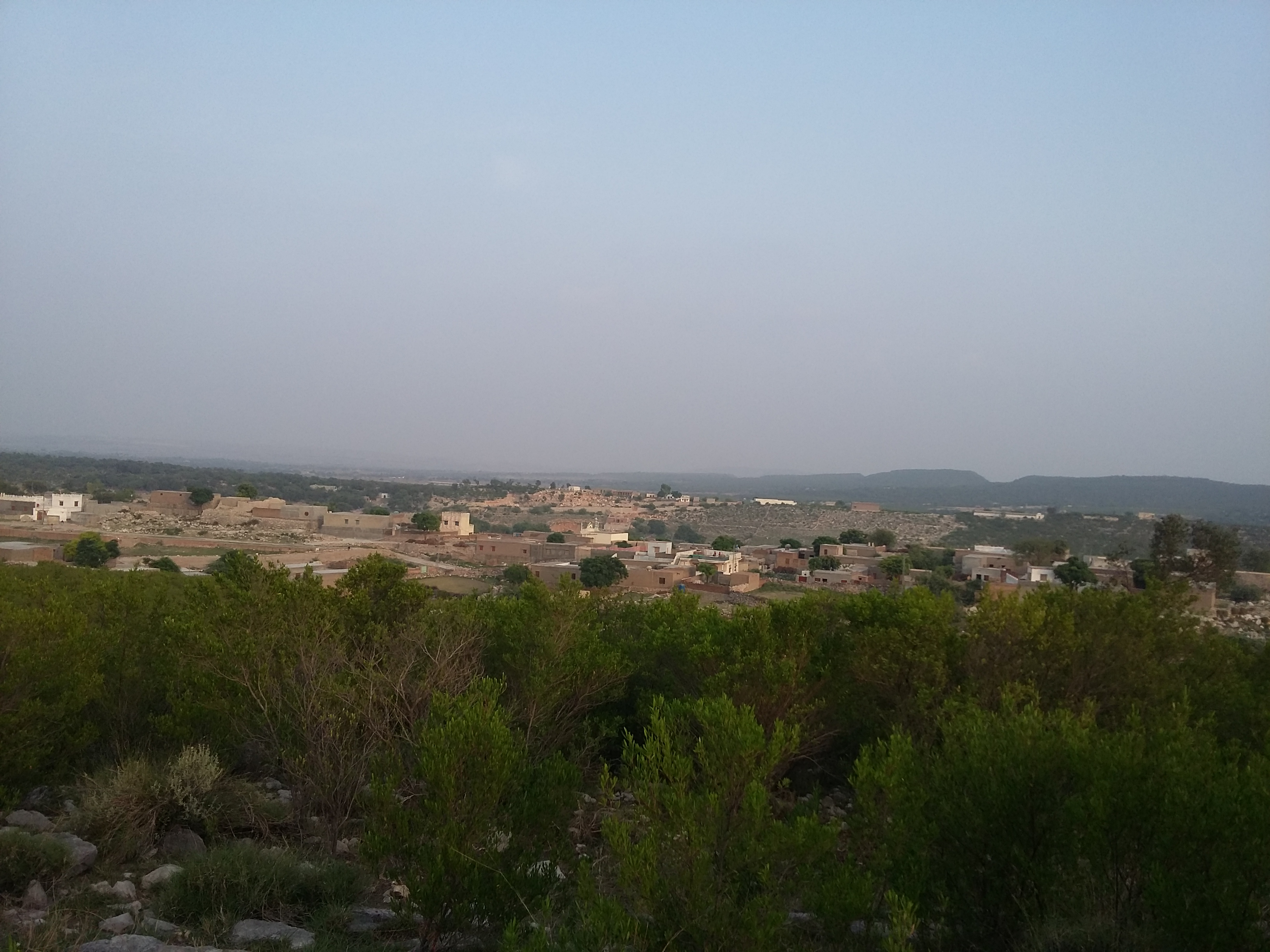
- View of Wasnal village

- Location in Pakistan
- Coordinates: 32°42′50″N 72°32′45″E
- Country: Pakistan
- Province: Punjab
- District: Chakwal
- Tehsil: Kallar Kahar
- Union council: Munara

Population (1998)
  - Total: approx. 5,000
- Time zone: UTC+5 (PST)
- Postal code: 48582
- Area code: 0543

Wasnal (Punjabi: وسّنال; Urdu: وسنال) is a village in the Kallar Kahar Tehsil of Chakwal District, in Punjab, Pakistan. It is approximately 27 kilometers from Kallar Kahar town towards Sargodha Highway, 6 kilometers from Munara Bypass of main road. It is bordered by Jhamra to east, Nurpur Sethi to southeast, Munara to southwest, while rest is surrounded by landscapes and lush green mountains. The elevation of Wasnal above sea level is 868 metres.

== Climate and ecology ==
The village was named "Wasnal" after the name of saint Baba Wassan (بابا وسّن), who established permanent settlement here. The climate of Wasnal village is slightly cool and different from surrounded region with hot to moderate summer and severe winter. The overall climate of plateau in which wasnal occupies is subtropical and sub-humid with the exception that it varies a little on the cooler side, owing to its elevation, from central Punjab. Change in Wasnal climate is due to its wide mountainous border and forestry area. There are two distinct rainy seasons: the summer season or the monsoon rains start by about mid July and last until the mid of September. Most of the precipitation is received during July, August and September. The winter rains begin in January and persist up to beginning of March. May is the driest month of the year. January being the coldest and June the hottest month of the year. During April to October Temperature here varies from 18 °C - 30 °C and a maximum of 33 °C. During winters the temperature often drops to below 0 °C, usually in December and January.

There is a small forest on the north of village which is a home of number of flora and fauna species. These species are distributed throughout the region from north border of Wasnal to the populated area of Talagang. This is the only region in this plateau which contain almost all natural resources for wild animals to survive.

=== Flora ===
There are a number of species of flora here. Some popular and well known species of trees are Acacia modesta (Phulai), Olea ferruginea (Kahu) and Prosopis glandulosa (keekar). Other common trees include Eucalyptus citriodora (Safeda), Morus nigra (Toot), Capparis decidua (Kariya), Dalbergia sissoo (Tali, Shisgam), Melia azedarach (Dhrek), Ziziphus mauritiana (Ber). Fimbristylis dichotoma, Phragmites karka, Typha domingensis, Dodonaea viscosa (Sanattha), Justicia adhatoda (Bhaiker), are the common shrubs of this area. There are eleven well known species of grasses, important for the ecosystem of the area, and to provide fodder to the domestic livestock of the region: Suaeda fruticosa, Kochia indica, Heliotropium curassavicum, Prosopis juliflora. Justicia adhatoda (Bhaiker), Chlorophytum borivilianum (Musli Safed), Malva parviflora (Sonchal), Tribulus terrestris (Gokhru) are used medicinally by the locals.

=== Fauna ===
To explore details about fauna in the region a survey was conducted in 2007, in the tehsil of Kallar Kahar in which Wasnal is occupied and lot of information was gathered. Main species of animals are endemic Punjab urial (Ovis vignei punjabiensis), Asiatic Jackal (Canis aureus) and Cape hare (Lepus capensis), wild boar (Sus scrofa) and Grey wolf (Canis lupus). Other species found in the area include Chinkara or Indian Gazelle (Gazella bennettii), Red Fox (Vulpes vulpes), Indian or Bengal Fox (Vulpes bengalensis) and Yellow-throated Marten (Martes flavigula).

== See also ==
- Munara
- Jhamra
- Talagang
- Nurpur
- Buchal Kalan
