= Khandowa =

Khandowa کھنڈوعہ
- Town
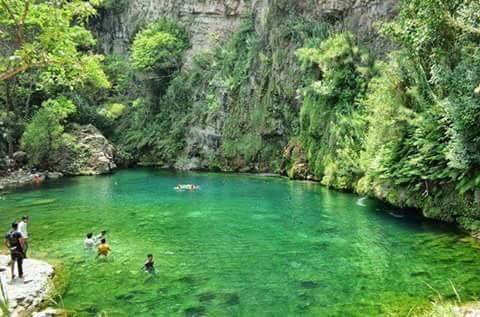
- View of lake Khandowa

- Location in Khandowa Pakistan
- Coordinates: 32°44′08″N 72°43′21″E
- Country: Pakistan
- Province: Punjab
- District: Chakwal
- Tehsil: Kallar Kahar

Population
  - Total: 3,500
- Time zone: UTC+5 (PST)
- Postal code: 4800
- Area code: 0543

Khandowa (Urdu: کھنڈوعہ) is a town in the Kallar Kahar Tehsil of Chakwal District in Punjab, Pakistan. The town's natural environment includes a number of historical lakes and resorts. Khandowa is 8 km from Kallar Kahar, 36 km from Chakwal, 114 km from Islamabad and 101 km from Rawalpindi in a northerly direction.

== Name and history ==
The word "Khandowa" is derived from Punjabi word khand, meaning sweet.

== Landmarks ==
Khandowa lake

Khandowa ground (Khandowa Valley)

== People and tribes Khandowa ==
People belonging to this village are mostly employees in Pakistan Army in various ranks, while the rest of the population are involved in livestock farming. General Musarrat Nawaz Malik s/o Col Muhammad Nawaz Malik, (Tamgha e Basalat) also hails from same village.

== Tourism ==
The area's tourist attractions include its valleys, and the lake of Swaik.

== Gallery ==
Lake Khandowa Gallery Good Images by Muhammad Ehsan Khandowa

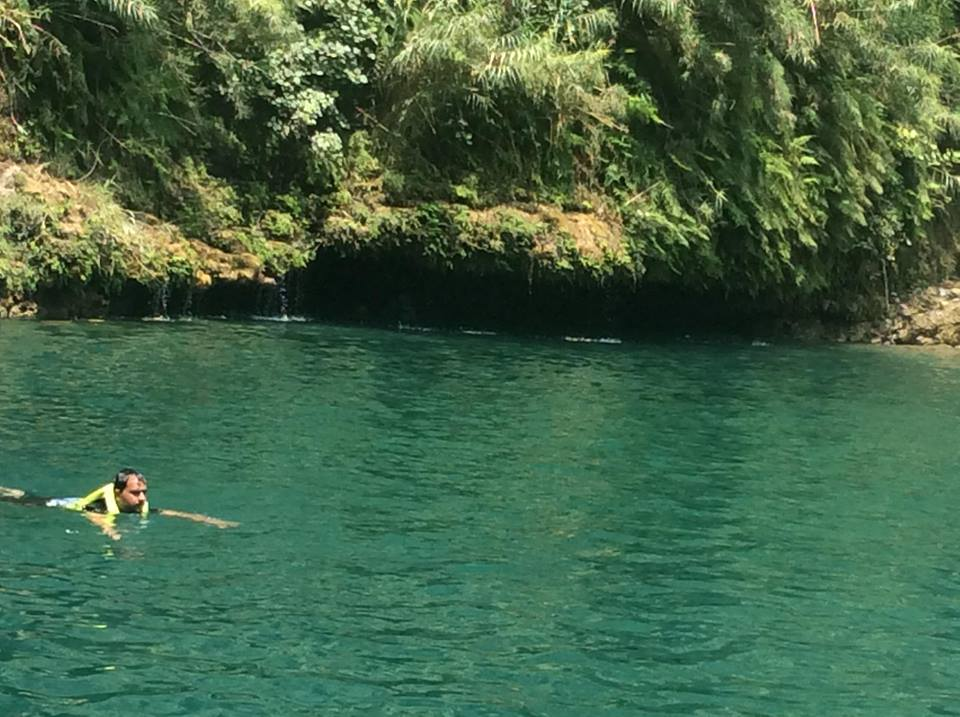
View of Lake Khandowa

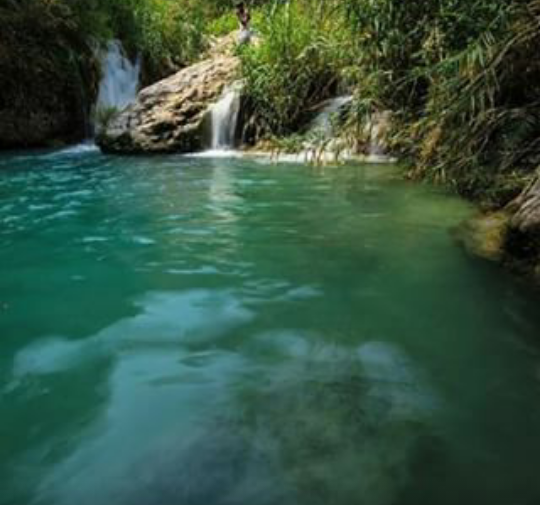
View of Lake Khandowa by Muhammad Ehsan Khandowa

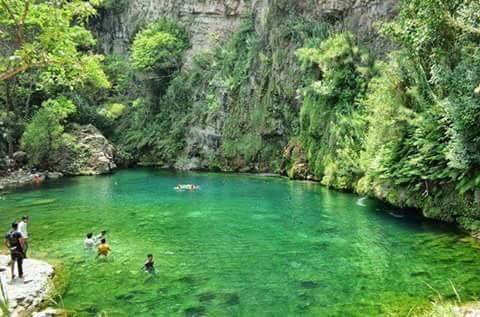
Lake Khandowa Good Chakwal Punjab, Pakistan by Muhammad Ehsan Khandowa
