= Khuian =

Village in Punjab, Pakistan

- Village
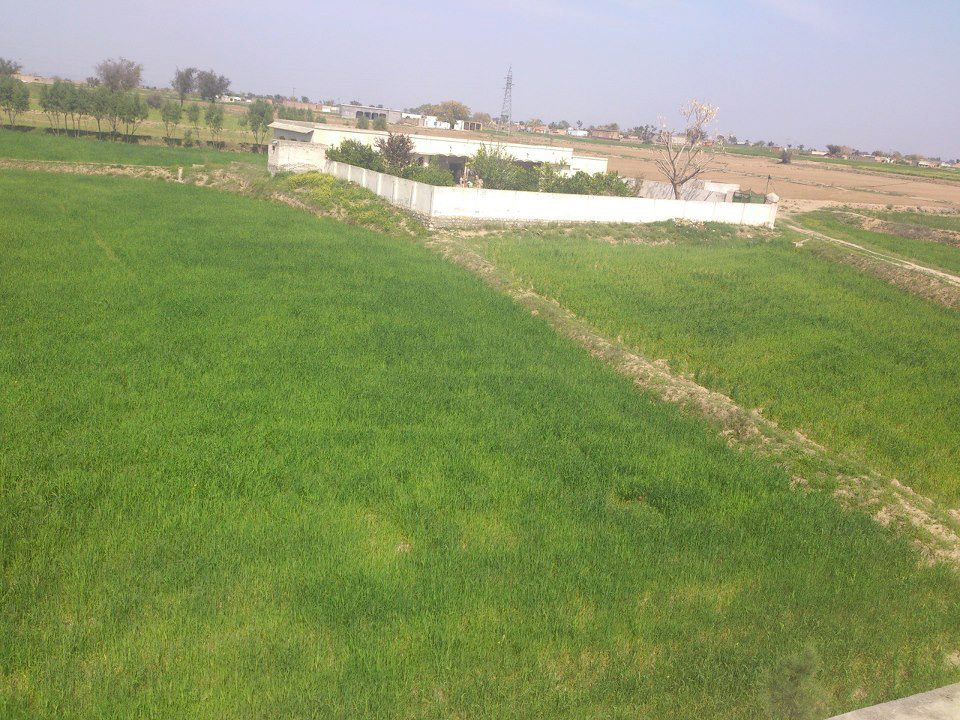

- Location within Punjab, Pakistan Location within Pakistan
- Coordinates: 33.021°N 72.055°E
- Pakistan: Pakistan
- Province: Punjab
- District: Talagang
- Tehsil: Talagang

Population
  - Total: Above 5,000
- Time zone: UTC+5 (PST)
- Post code: 48040
- Area code: 0543

Khuian (Urdu, Punjabi: کھوئیاں) is a village in Talagang District of Punjab, Pakistan. It is located 35 km to the west of Talagang city.

== Education ==
Government Schools

- Govt Degree College Khuian Multan For Women
- Govt Elementary School (GES) Khuian, Chakwal
- Govt Girls Community Model Elementary School Khuian

Private Schools

- Allied School System, Khuian
- Noble Cambridge School
- Eman Vacational School Khuian

== Nearby villages ==
- Tamman
- Multan Khurd
- Shah Muhammadi
- Tarap
- Suriali
- Kutera
- Leti
- Noorpur
- Dandi
- Sangwala
- Budhial

== Weather ==
Climate data for KHUIAN
| Month | Jan | Feb | Mar | Apr | May | Jun | Jul | Aug | Sep | Oct | Nov | Dec | Year |
|---|---|---|---|---|---|---|---|---|---|---|---|---|---|
| Mean daily maximum °C (°F) | 20 (68) | 22 (72) | 26 (79) | 36 (97) | 42 (108) | 50 (122) | 43 (109) | 40 (104) | 36 (97) | 32 (90) | 26 (79) | 22 (72) | 30.6 (87.1) |
| Mean daily minimum °C (°F) | 8 (46) | 11 (52) | 15.5 (59.9) | 19 (66) | 25 (77) | 27 (81) | 26 (79) | 26 (79) | 25 (77) | 20 (68) | 14 (57) | 9 (48) | 18.8 (65.8) |
| Average precipitation mm (inches) | 18 (0.7) | 36 (1.4) | 24 (0.9) | 13 (0.5) | 17 (0.7) | 48 (1.9) | 82 (3.2) | 87 (3.4) | 43 (1.7) | 9 (0.4) | 11 (0.4) | 12 (0.5) | 400 (15.7) |
| Average precipitation days (≥ 1.0 mm) | 5 | 4 | 5 | 4 | 3 | 3 | 7 | 7 | 4 | 1 | 1 | 1 | 45 |

== Schools ==
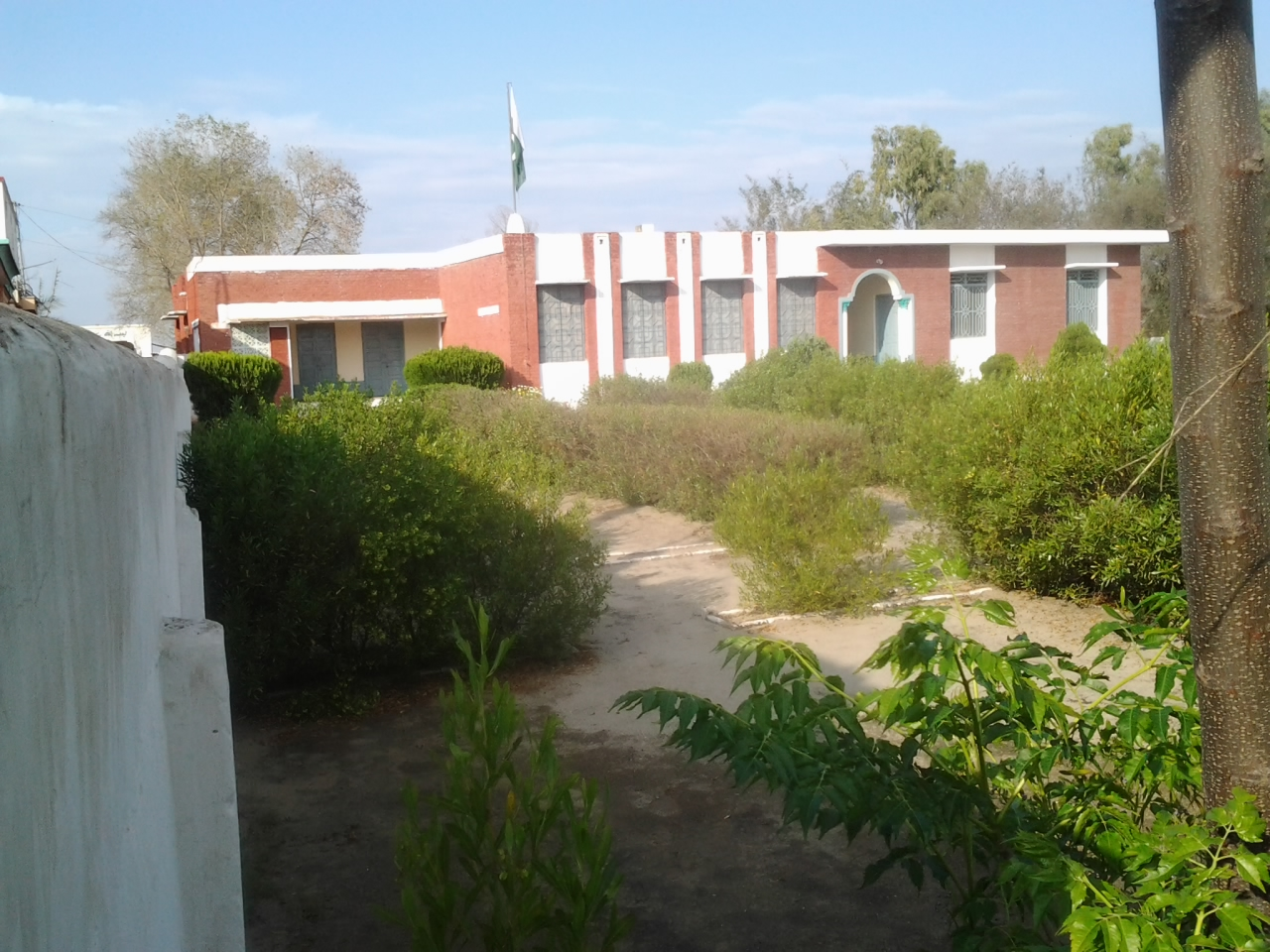
Govt Elementary School (GES) Khuian,

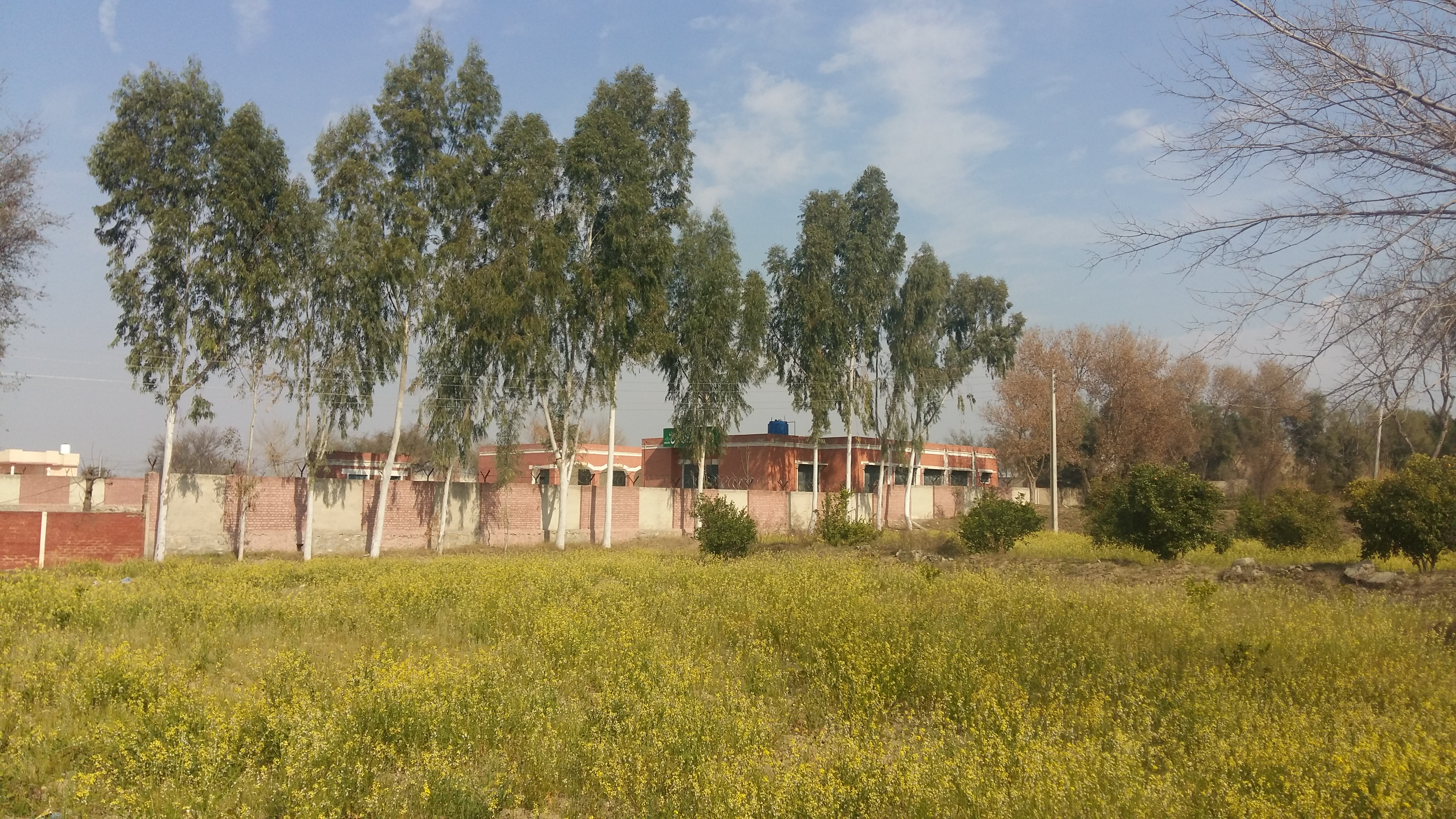
Govt Girls Community Model Elementary School Khuian,

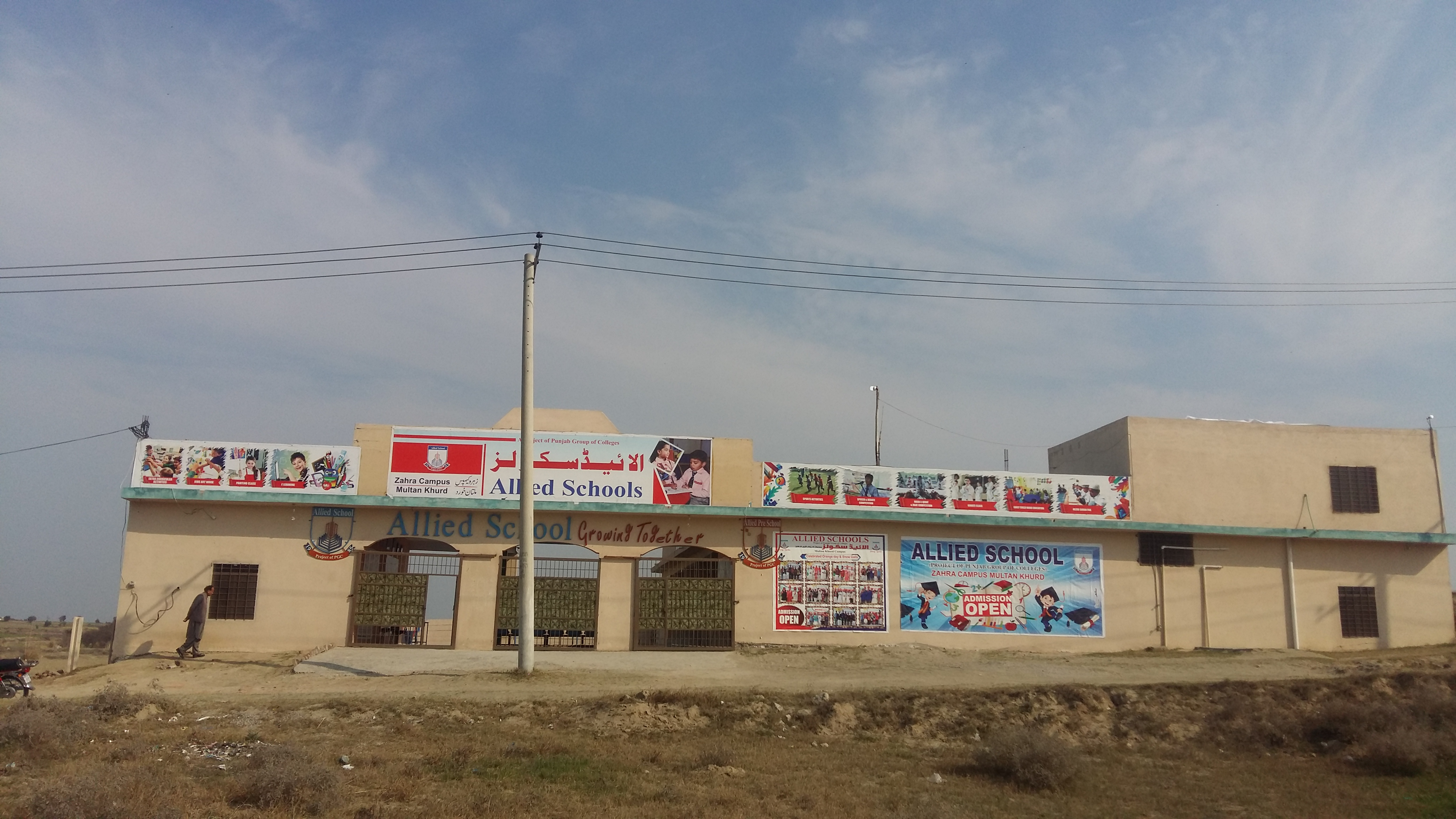
Allied School System, Khuian

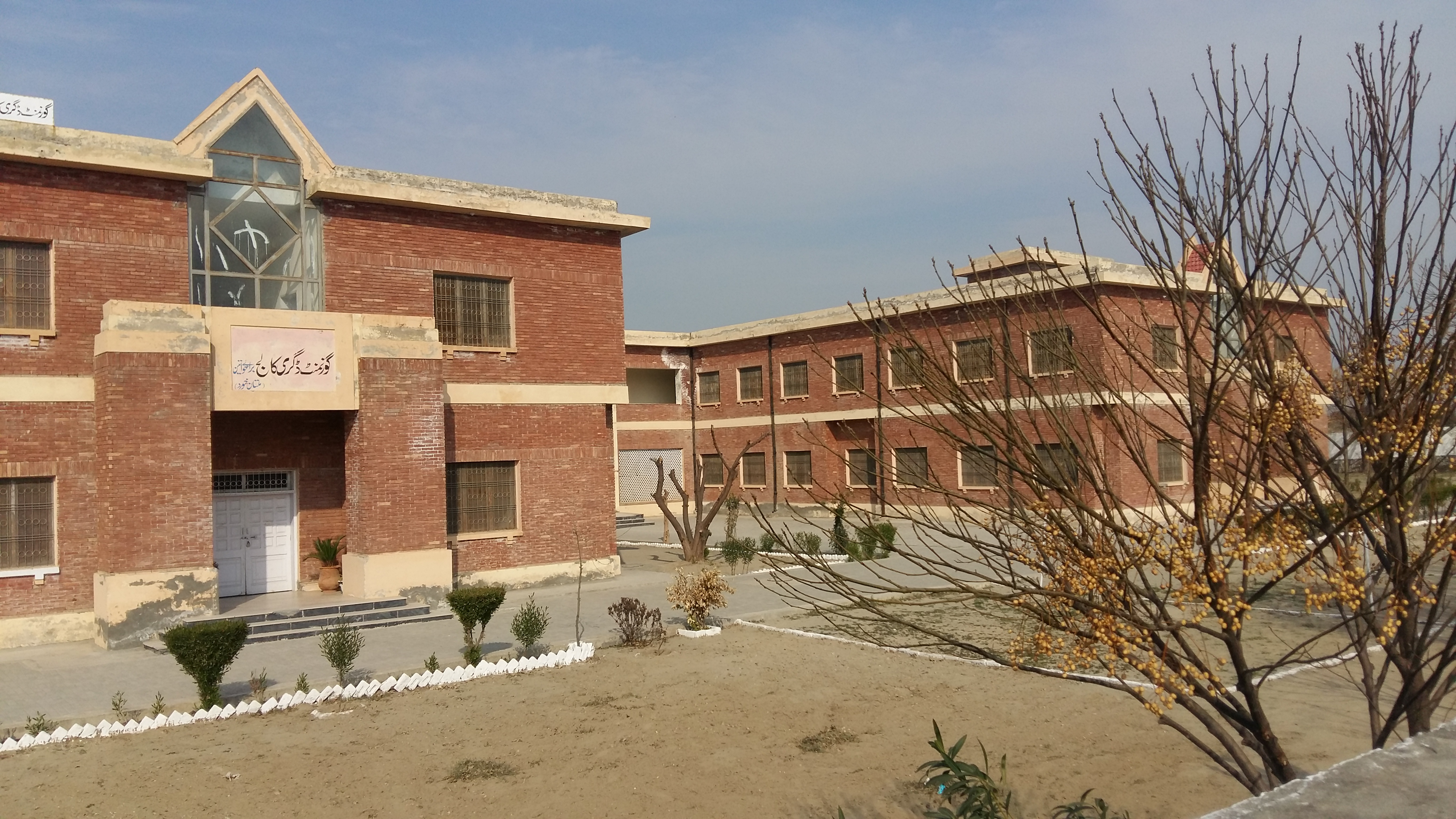
Govt Dgree College Khuian Multan For Women

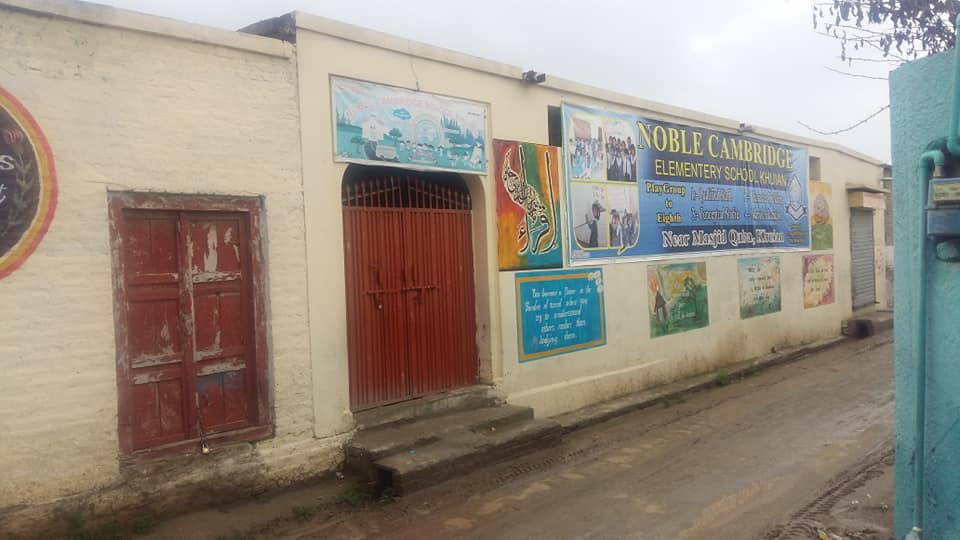
Noble Cambridge School Khuian

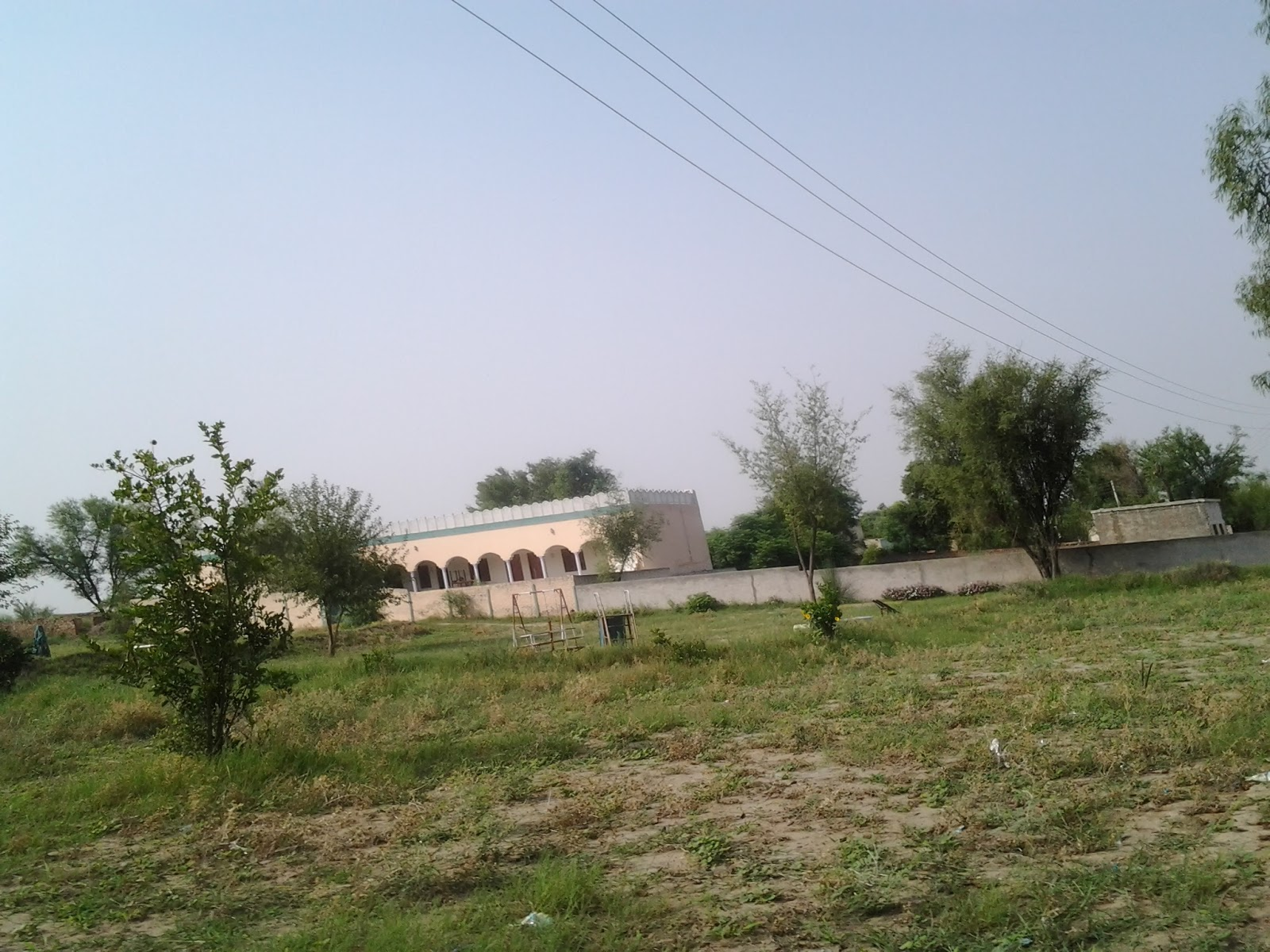
Eman Vacational School Khuian
