= Ameer Muhammad Akram Awan =

Spiritual leader of Naqshbandia Owaisiah

Sheikh Ameer Muhammad Akram Awan امیر محمد اکرم اعوان
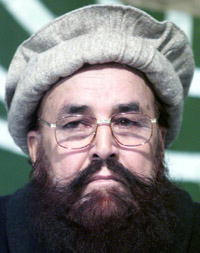

Personal life
- Born: 31 December 1934 Noorpur, Punjab British India, Present Day Punjab, Pakistan
- Died: 7 December 2017 (aged 82) Rawalpindi, Punjab, Pakistan
- Citizenship: British Indian (1934-1947); Pakistani (1947-2017)
- Notable work: Asrar at-Tanzeel
- Occupation: Mufassir, Sheikh

Religious life
- Religion: Islam
- Tariqa: Naqshbandia Owaisiah
- Creed: Sunni

Senior posting
- Disciple of: Allah Yar Khan
- Awards: Ranked in the top 500 of the most influential Muslims
- Website: www.naqshbandiaowaisiah.org

Ameer Muhammad Akram Awan (Urdu: امیر محمد اکرم اعوان, Amīr Muḥammad Akram A'wān; 31 December 1934 in Noorpur Sethi, British India – 7 December 2017 in Rawalpindi, Pakistan) was an Islamic scholar and spiritual leader of the Naqshbandia Owaisiah order of Sufism. He belonged to Awan tribe. As a mufassir, he authored four exegeses (tafsir) of the Qur'an, including Asrar at-Tanzeel. Awan was dean of the Siqarah Education System and patron of the magazine Al-Murshid and of the Al-Falah Foundation.
