= Swaik Lake =

- Lake
- کھنڈوعہ جھیل
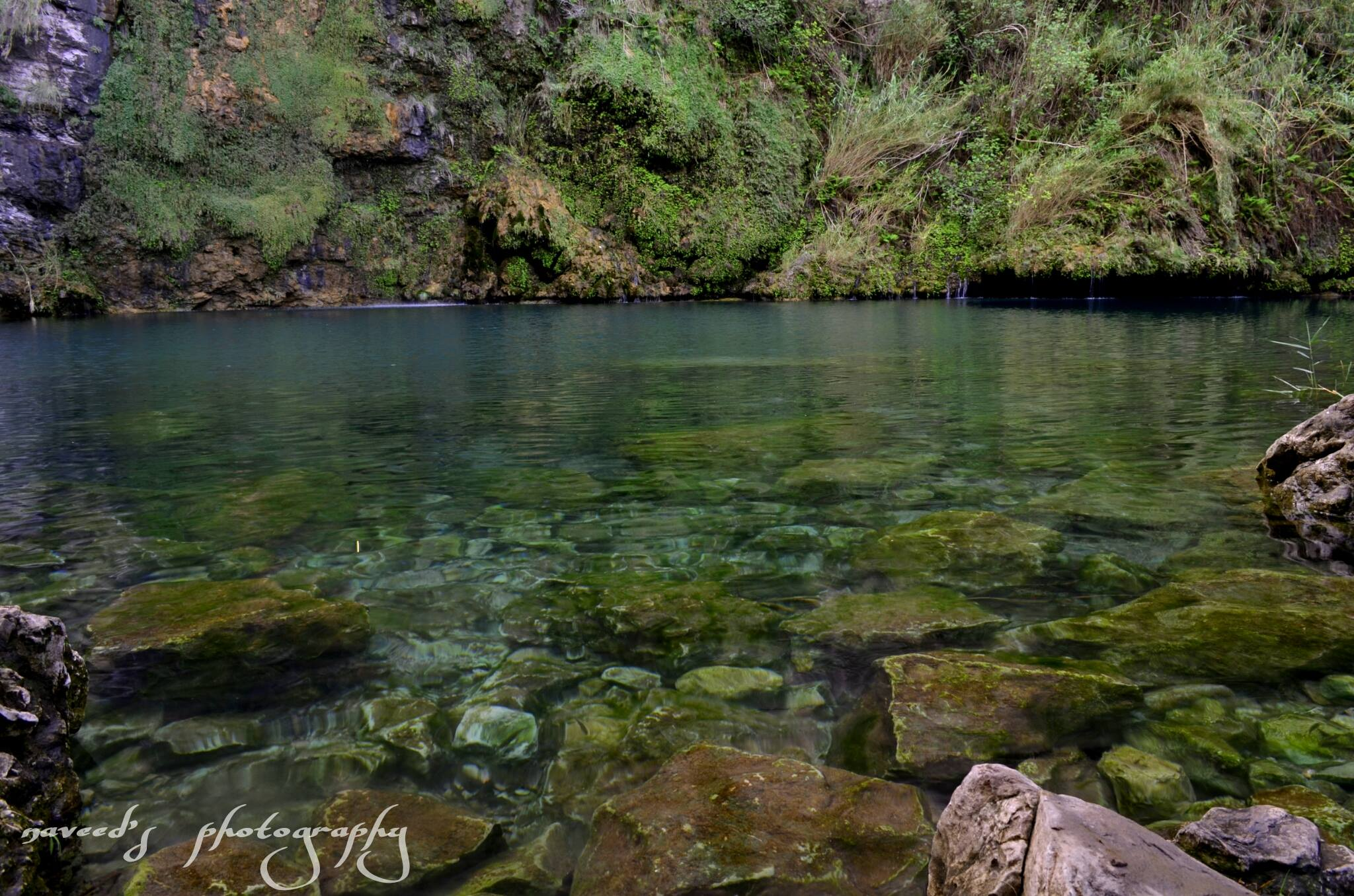
- View of Swaik lake

- Location within Pakistan
- Coordinates: 32°44′08″N 72°43′21″E
- Country: Pakistan
- Province: Punjab
- District: Chakwal
- Tehsil: Kallar Kahar

Swaik Lake (also known as: Khandowa Lake) (Urdu: کھنڈوعہ جھیل) is a lake located in Kallar Kahar Tehsil, Chakwal District of Punjab the province of Pakistan. It can be accessed through the M2 motorway linking Lahore and Islamabad. The lake is located about 10 kilometres (6.2 mi) from the Kallar Kahar and 48 kilometres (30 mi) southwest of city of Chakwal along the Motorway (M-2). A waterfall is located at the lake. It is a tourist attraction which allows for swimming and diving.

== See also ==
- List of lakes of Pakistan
