= Miani, Chakwal =

Miani, Chakwal Ochunan
- Village and union council
- Country: Pakistan
- Region: Punjab Province
- District: Chakwal District
- Time zone: UTC+5 (PST)

Miani is a village and union council of Chakwal District in the Punjab Province of Pakistan, it is part of Kalar Kahar Tehsil. Miani is the center of trade of Wanhar and Pail Padhrar region.There are the shrines of the spiritual leader of silsilya Chishtiyya Nizamiya Owaisiya, among them Hazrat Khwaja Pir Syed Imamuddin Shah Sialvi(Khalifa Majaz Pir of Alawal Sharif Hazrat Khawaja Syed Muhammad Hayat Shah Hamdani Min Khalfay Pir Sial) and his son Well-known social personality of wanhar region Hazrat Khwaja Pir Syed Qamaruddin Shah Sialvi(Khalifa Majaz Hazrat Khwaja Syed Shah Muhammad Ghos Hamdani Min Khalfay Pir Sial) and his grandson Hazrat Khwaja Pir Syed Abdul Ghafoor Shah sialvi(khalifa majaz shalbandi Sharif Swat)are included.There are the Shrines of two more spiritual leaders are also in Miani Hazrat Syed Badshah popularly known as Baba Parana Faqir and Hazrat Miyan Ghos Salahuddin.
