= Takht-e-Babri =

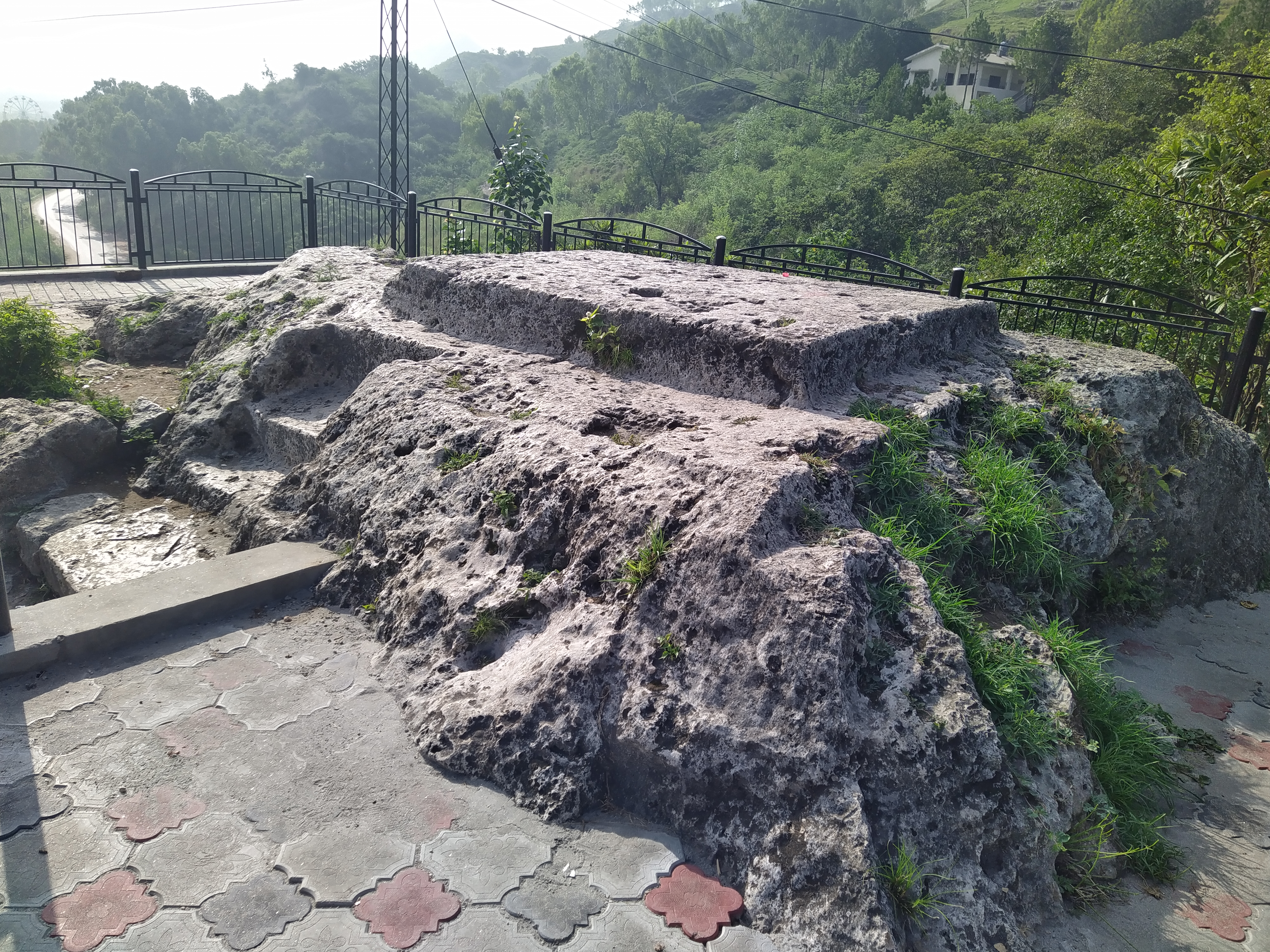
Takht-e-Babri, a place from where Babar spoke to his army.

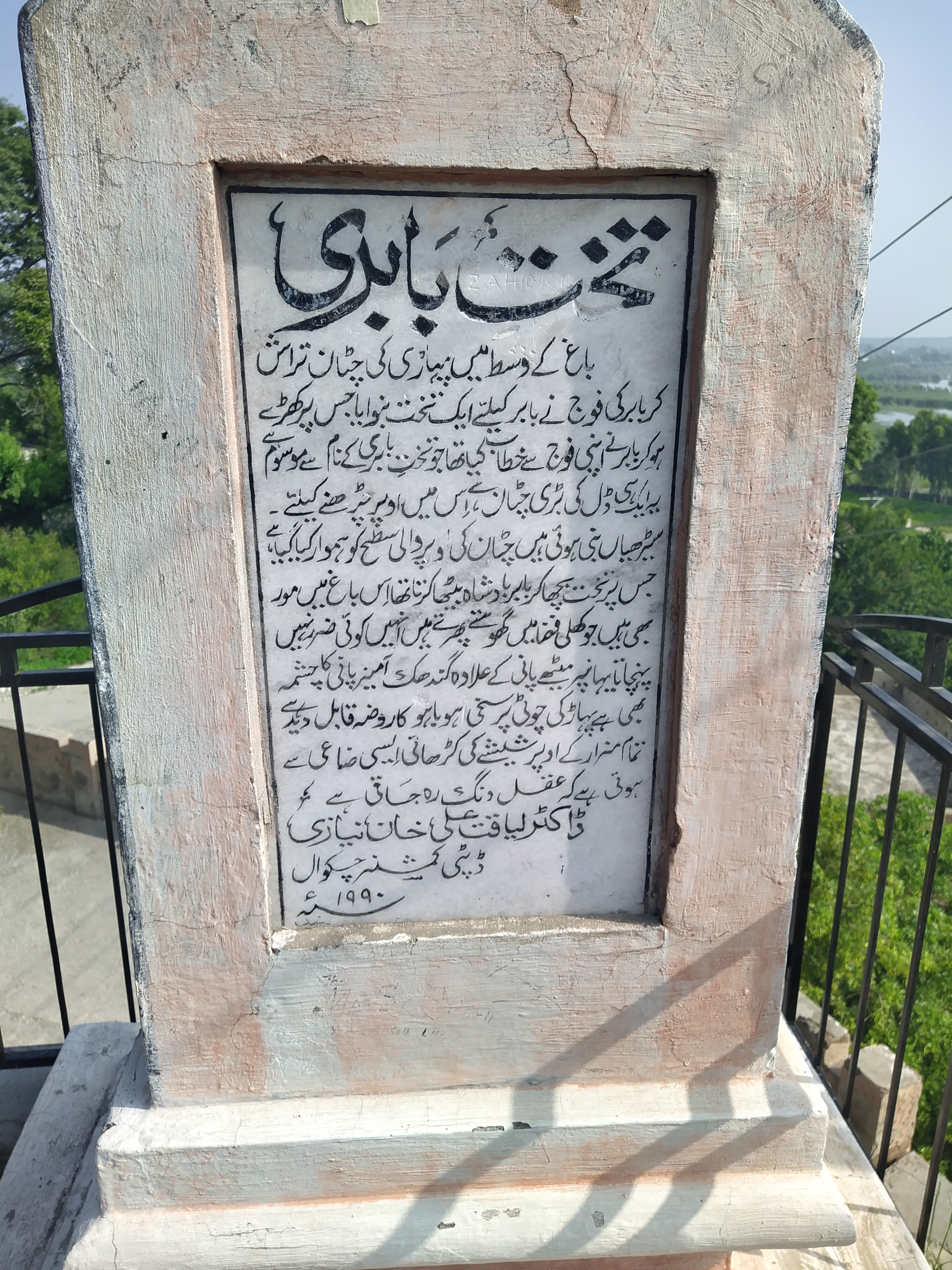
Plaque on Takht-e-Babri

Takht-e-Babri (Urdu: تختِ بابری) is a tourist destination in Kallar Kahar, Chakwal District in Punjab, Pakistan. It is located 25 kilometres southwest of Chakwal along the motorway. Takht-e-Babri is a flat stage and throne cut out of stone by the 1st Mughal Emperor King Babur to address his army while coming down from Kabul in the quest of the crown of Delhi.
