= Bharpur =

- Location in Pakistan
- Coordinates: 32°51′N 72°34′E
- Country: Pakistan
- Province: Punjab
- District: Chakwal
- Tehsil: Kallar Kahar

Population
  - Total: 3,000
- Time zone: UTC+5 (PST)
  - Summer (DST): +6

Bharpur (Urdu: بھرپور) is a village and union council of Chakwal District in the Punjab Province of Pakistan, it is part of kallar kahar and is located at 32°51'0N 72°34'0E.

50% people are agriculturist and 35% are in serving in Pakistan Army. Bharpur is a 2nd biggist village in district.Notable names of Bharpur are Khalid mehmood Zargar.and also his son Dr.tahir mahmood zargar , Malik WARIS Khan (Bakswaal), Peer Bahawalhaq, Peer Chan Badshah, Qawal Jami and sultan Jami, Baba Hakum (Munda), Dr Saghir, Altaf Gang(Late), Ghulam Abbas SHAIT, Haji Ghulam Murtaza (Namardaar), Ghulan Hadiar (Namardaar), Malik Ghulam SAFDAR (Namardaar Dock AYAIT), Aerani Brothran, Babu Anwal, DSP Nisar Kothi(Late), Capt Moula Bakhsh(late), Chacha Katoo, Zakir Chairman(Fasadi), Ustad Meli and Barkat(Late). Caste of this village are awan. Pakistan military accounts and Pak Army are most of the people .History: the history of this village is very complex there was a university named JABA UNIVERSITY it created lot of people such as engineers, doctors, business men, etc.

Hobbies:

Gaming, Gupshup round Doctor Ghulam haider(marhoom) and his son's clinic and on hotels(Molvi Hotel Umer Hayat Hotel and Mulazim Hotel)

Main Caste :

Segal, Kisraa, Hasly, Bakshawaal(Awan), Hesial, Mankal, Anwal, Madari, Agral,
