= Munara =

- Village and union council
- Location in Pakistan
- Coordinates: 32°40′05″N 72°30′50″E
- Country: Pakistan
- Province: Punjab
- District: Chakwal
- Tehsil: Kallar Kahar

Government
- Time zone: UTC+5 (PST)

Munara (Greek: Μουνάρα) is a village and union council of Chakwal District in the Punjab Province of Pakistan. It is part of Kallar Kahar tehsil. Most popularly known to be the headquarter of Silsilah Naqshbandiah Owaisiah. It is also the burial place of the sufi sheikh Muhammad Akram Awan.
