= Jhamra =

- Union Council
- Chak 434 Gb Jhamra
- Location within Punjab, Pakistan Location within Pakistan
- Coordinates: 31°02′41.8″N 73°18′20.9″E
- Country: Pakistan
- Province: Punjab
- District: Faisalabad
- Tehsil: Tandlianwala
- Elevation: 184 m (604 ft)
- Time zone: UTC+5 (PST)
- Calling code: 041

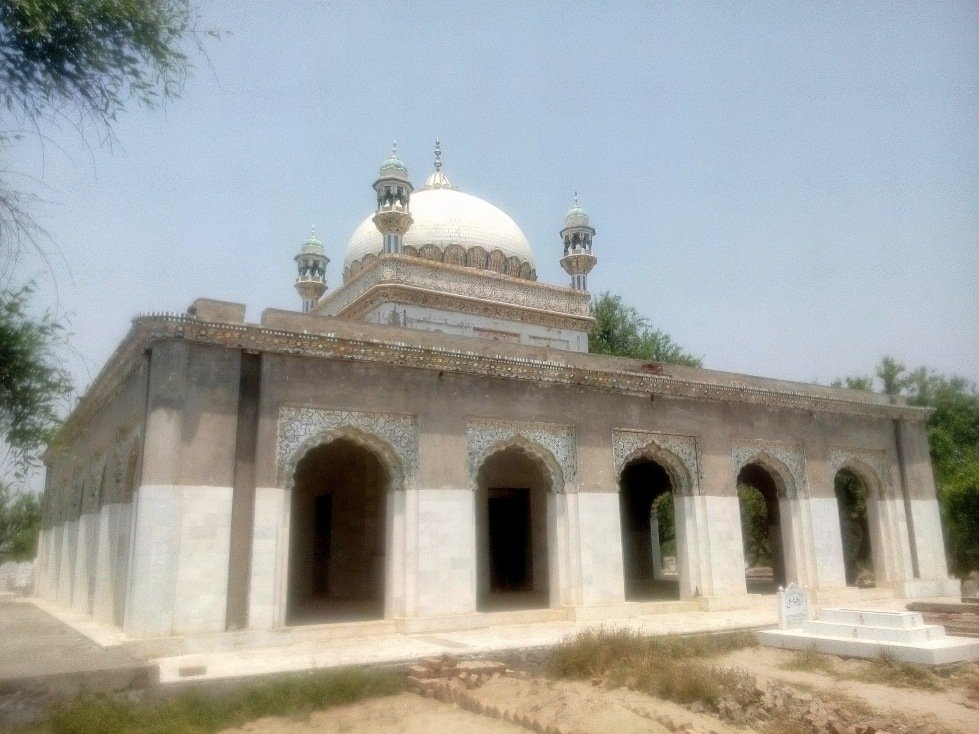
Tomb of Rai Ahmad Khan Kharal in Jhamra

Jhamra (Punjabi: جھامرا) is a village of the Faisalabad District in Punjab, Pakistan. It is known for being the birthplace and final resting place of Rai Ahmad Khan Kharal, a famous Punjabi Muslim freedom fighter of the War of Independence (1857), who was known as the Nawab of Jhamra. He died fighting against the forces of the British British East India Company on 23 September 1857.
