= Kallar Kahar Tehsil =

Tehsil in Punjab, Pakistan

Kallar Kahar تحصِيل كلّر كہار
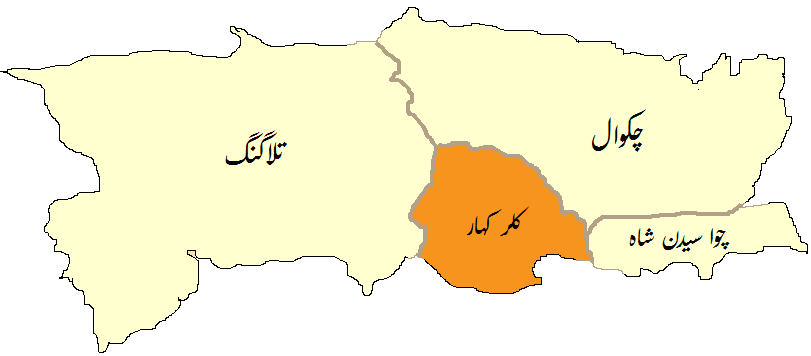
- Kallarkahartehsil
- Country: Pakistan
- Region: Punjab
- District: Chakwal District
- Capital: Kallar Kahar
- Towns: 1
- Union Councils: 9
- Time zone: UTC+5 (PST)
  - Summer (DST): UTC+5 (PDT)

Kallar Kahar Tehsil (in Punjabi and Urdu تحصِيل كلّر كہار) is an administrative subdivision (tehsil) of Chakwal District in the Punjab province of Pakistan. Kallar Kahar city serves as the tehsil headquarters.

The area is also known for its peacocks and a salt water natural lake. One of the reputed cadet colleges is also located in this town. The population of Kallar Kahar town was 24,283, per the 2017 census.

Municipal Committees
| Sr. NO | Name |
| 1 | Municipal Committee Bhaun |
| 2 | Municipal Committee Kallar Kahar |

Name Of Union Council & Its Population (1998)
| Union Council | Population ( Thousand Persons) |
| Khairpur | 14276 |
| Kallar Kahar | 14005 |
| Noorpur | 14434 |
| Buchal Kallan | 18907 |
| Miani | 15856 |
| Bhaun | 18070 |
| Bharpur | 13410 |
| Munara | 12869 |
| Wasnal | 12870 |
