= Sangwala =

Sangwala Sangwala, Talagang, Pakistan
- Village
- Sangwala,سریالی
- Sangwala, Talagang, Pakistan Sangwala (Pakistan)
- Coordinates: 33.090033°N 72.092425°E
- Country: Pakistan
- Region: Punjab
- District: Talagang

Population
  - Total: Above 8,000
- Time zone: UTC+5 (PST)
- Area code: 0543
- Website: sangwala.com

Sangwala (Urdu: سنگوالہ) is a village in Talagang District of Punjab, Pakistan.
