= Buchal Kalan =

Pakistani village and union council

- Village and Union Council
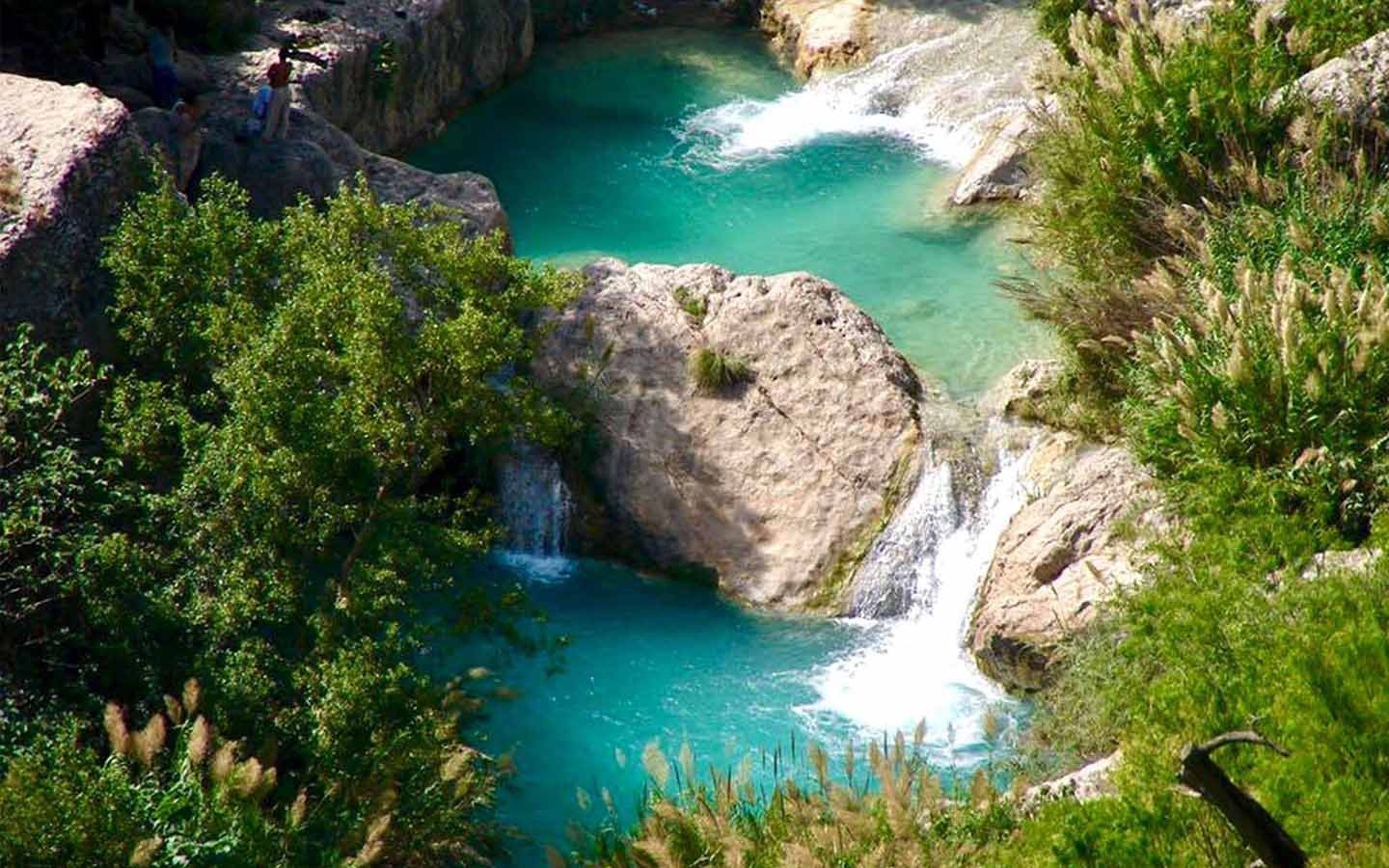
- Neela Wahn located in Buchal Kalan

- Location in Pakistan
- Coordinates: 32°40′47″N 72°38′02″E
- Country: Pakistan
- Province: Punjab
- District: Chakwal

Area
  - Total: 1.4 km^{2} (0.54 sq mi)
- Elevation: 841 m (2,759 ft)
- Time zone: UTC+5 (PST)

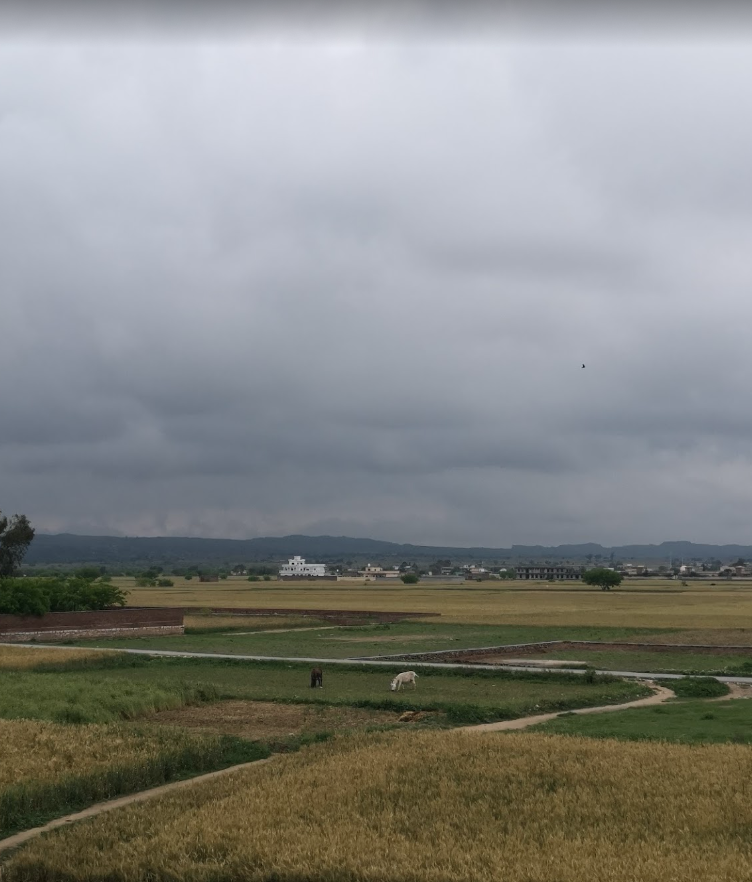
The Village of Buchal Kalan is pictured in the background of this landscape.

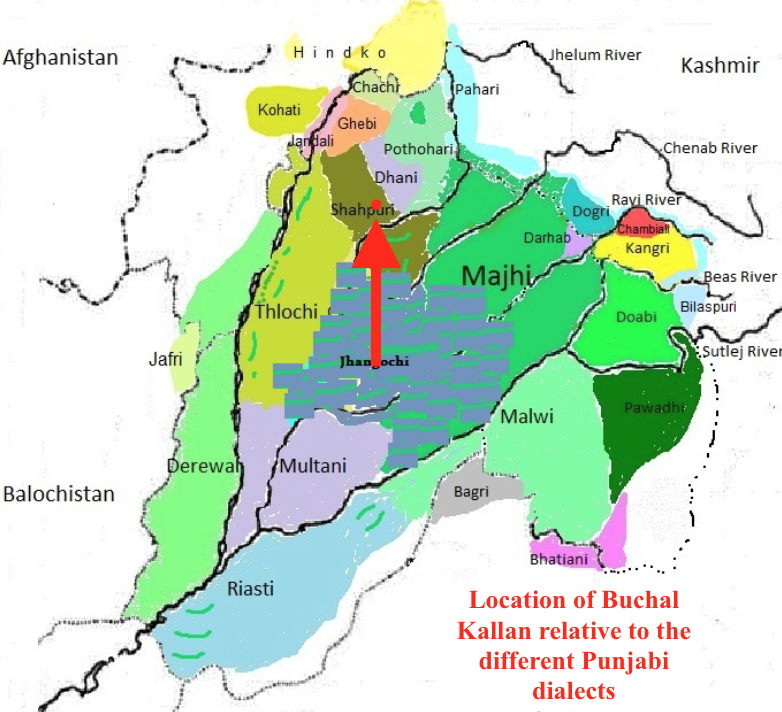
The dialect of Punjabi spoken in Buchal Kalan

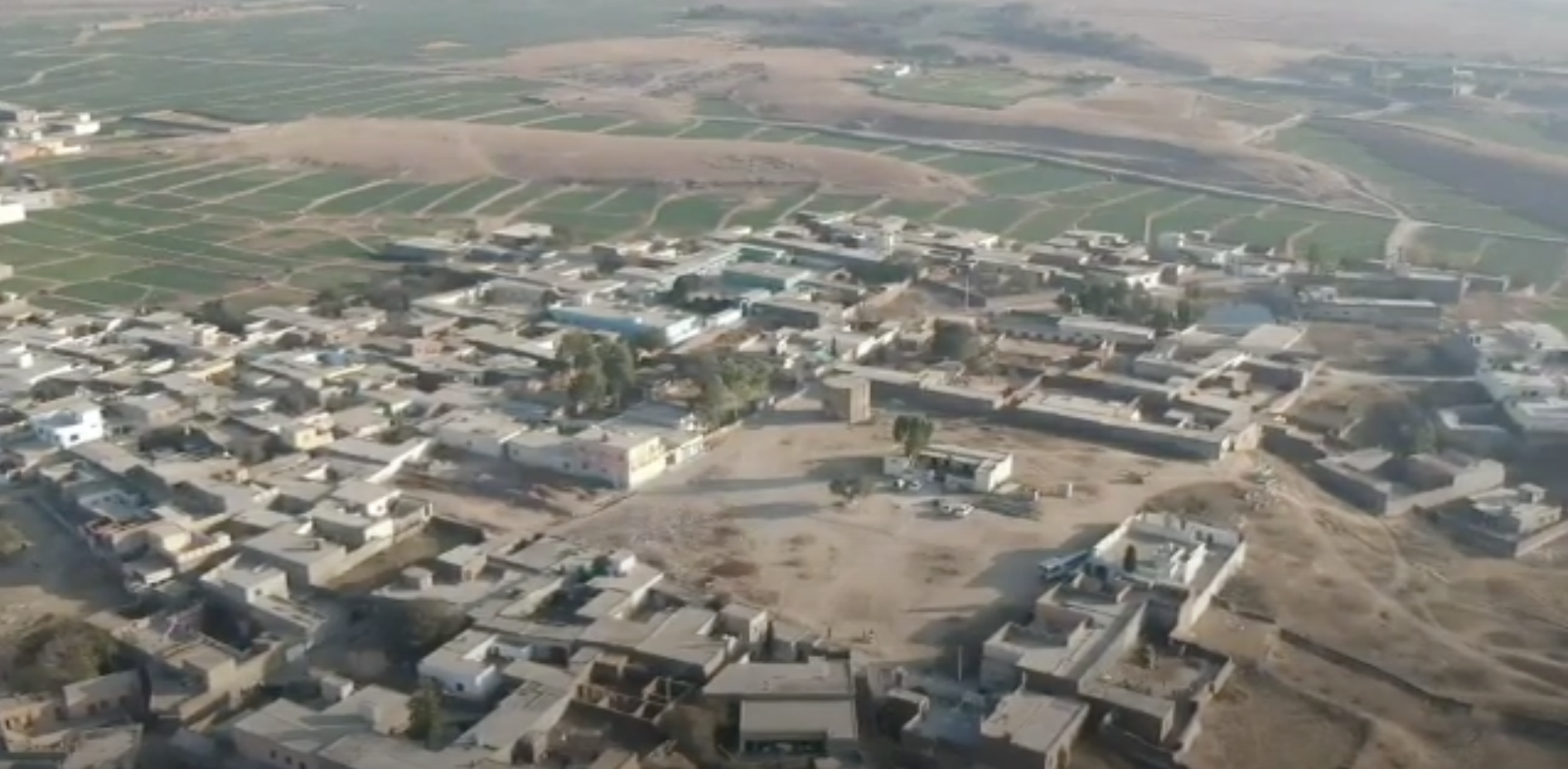
An aerial photograph of Buchal Kalan (South)

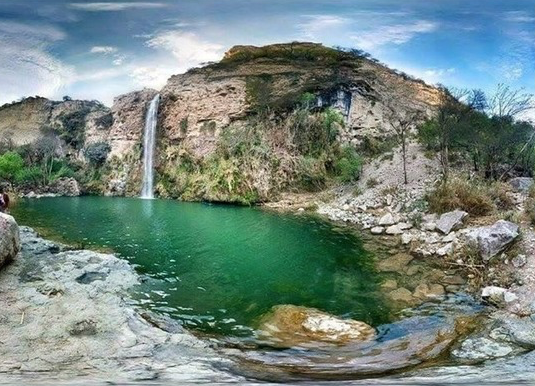
Neela Wahn

Buchal Kalan (Urdu: بوچھال کلاں), or simply Buchal, is a village and union council of Chakwal District in the Punjab Province of Pakistan. It is part of the Kallar Kahar Tehsil. As of the most recently available data, the population of Buchal Kalan is 45,000 people and there are 2916 households in the village. Buchal Kalan is located 35 km southwest of Chakwal and 12 km southwest of Kallar Kahar. The elevation of Buchal Kalan is 841 meters and it is situated close to the villages Dharokna and Jhamrah.

== History ==
This village is named after Bahauddin (Booch) who migrated here in the 16th century with his sons. He is from the lineage of Arabs belonging to the descendants of Ali. He was looking for a place to resettle and found this area to be great place for him to herd his cattle. Over 70% of the people living in Buchal Kalan today are among his descendants. The village is divided into many small tribes.

== Education ==
A great amount of shaheeds are buried under the soil of this village. In this village,first school was started in 1902, now there are two degree colleges and two high schools. The people of Buchal Kalan are well (92.9%) educated due to the high literacy rate. The area of Buchal Kalan is disputed however the area of the main village as presented on the bottom right photo is approximately 2 km^{2}. Buchal Kalan has the highest literacy rate in the Chakwal Administrative District.

== Geography ==
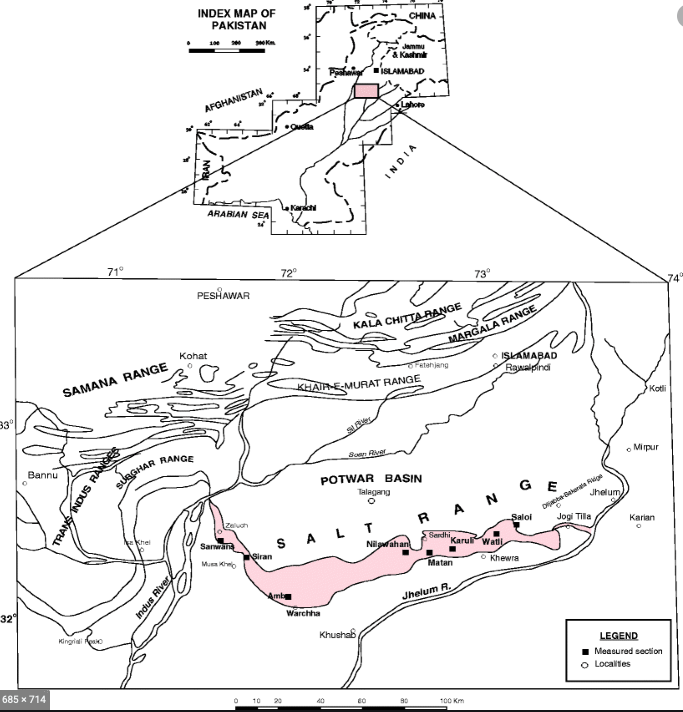
Buchal Kalan Salt Range

Buchal Kalan is located approximately 12 km southwest of Kallar Kahar and 30 km west of the Khewra Salt Mine. However, even though the distance between Buchal Kalan and Kallar Kahar is relatively short, there is an important difference to note in regards to elevation. Buchal Kalan is located on the Punjab salt range which is a geographical feature east to a section of the Indus River basin and south of the Postwar Basin. This salt range is a distinctly elevated area about 13 km wide and 126 km long. However, the city of Kallar Kahar is located in the Postwar Basin relatively close to the salt range highlands. The Salt Range is the youngest and the most southern part of the western Himalayan Ranges in Pakistan.

The physical arrangement of the village itself in regards to buildings and housing is fairly centralized, as illustrated by the aerial graphic. Crop fields as well as open areas can be found in the outskirts of the village proper.

== Neela Wahn (Blue Waterfalls) ==
What locals refer to as "Neela Wahn" is a series of water springs and waterfalls. As shown on the aerial photo, the location in which the waterfalls are located, is distinctly green as compared to the rest of the plateau.
