= Shah Muhammadi =

Pakistani village

- Village
- Location within Punjab, Pakistan Location within Pakistan
- Coordinates: 33.025047°N 72.061215°E
- Country: Pakistan
- Region: Punjab Province
- District: Chakwal District
- Tehsil: Talagang

Population
  - Total: 5,000
- Time zone: UTC+5 (PST)
- Area code: 0543

Shah Muhammadi(Urdu: شاہ محمدی) is a Village in Pakistan, located in Chakwal District of Punjab, Pakistan.
