= Noorpur, Chakwal =

- Village and union council
- Country: Pakistan
- Province: Punjab
- District: Chakwal
- Time zone: UTC+5 (PST)

Noorpur is a village and union council of Chakwal District in the Punjab Province of Pakistan. It is part of Kallar Kahar Tehsil. It contains seven villages: Sar Kalan, Matan, Sethi, Matan Kalan, Laphi, Noorpur and Bhall.
