= Kallar Kahar =

Kallar Kahar كلّر كہار
- Town
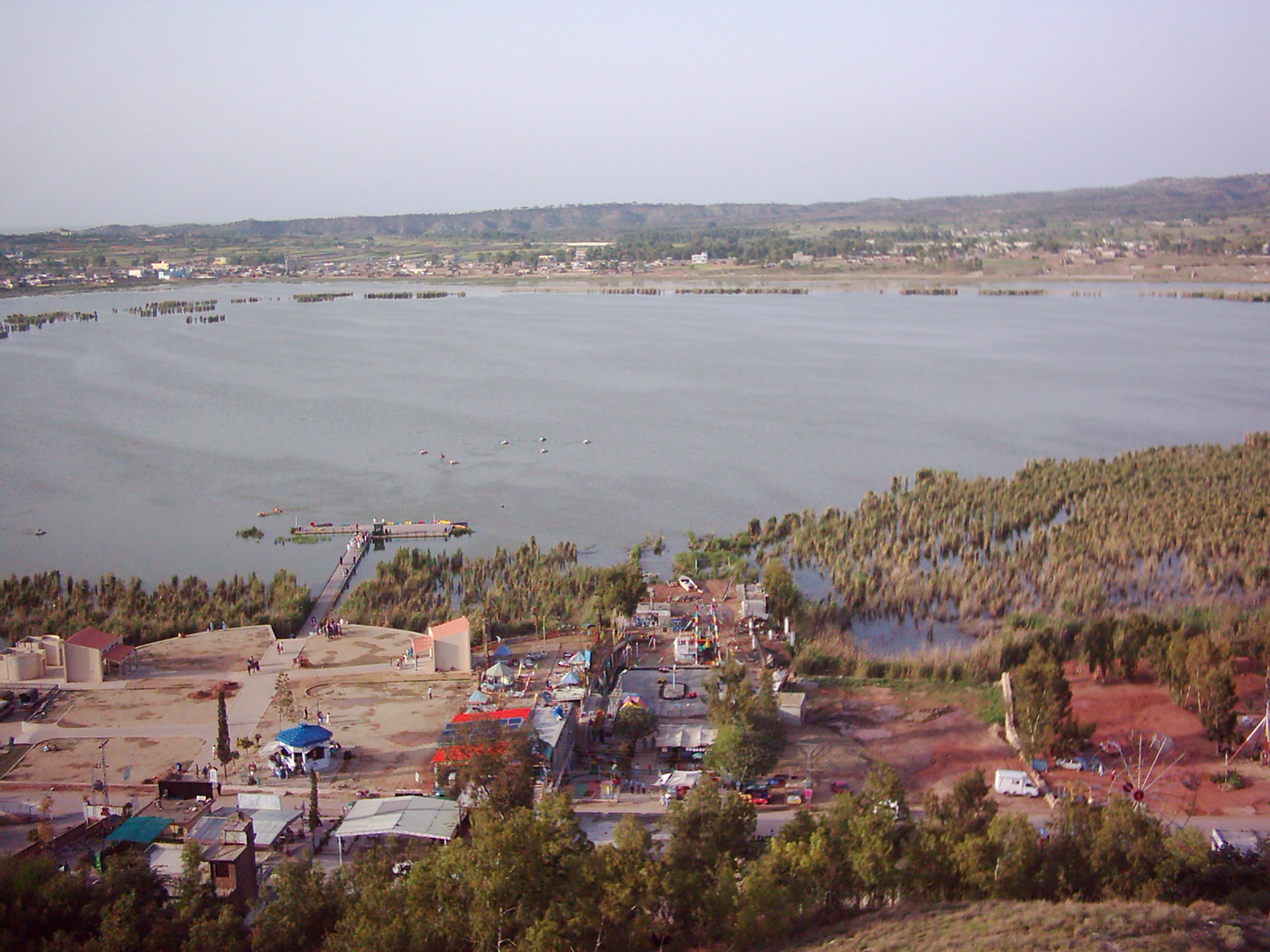

- Location in Pakistan Kallar Kahar (Pakistan)
- Coordinates: 32°47′N 72°42′E
- Country: Pakistan
- District: Chakwal District
- Time zone: UTC+5 (PST)
- Postal code: 48800
- Area code: 0543

Kallar Kahar (Urdu: كلّر كہار) is a town of Chakwal District in Punjab, Pakistan. It is the capital of Kallar Kahar Tehsil which is an administrative subdivion of the district.

Emperor Babar described Kallar Kahar in his memoirs as a “child of Kashmir” due to its natural beauty and charming weather. It was a natural sanctuary of peacocks, but their population has decreased due to the increasing population around the mountain and illegal catching of the beautiful birds. Babar also referred to Takht-e-Babri, as a "charming place with good air".

== See also ==
- PAF Base Kallar Kahar
